= Monuments in the Basilica of Santa Maria del Popolo =

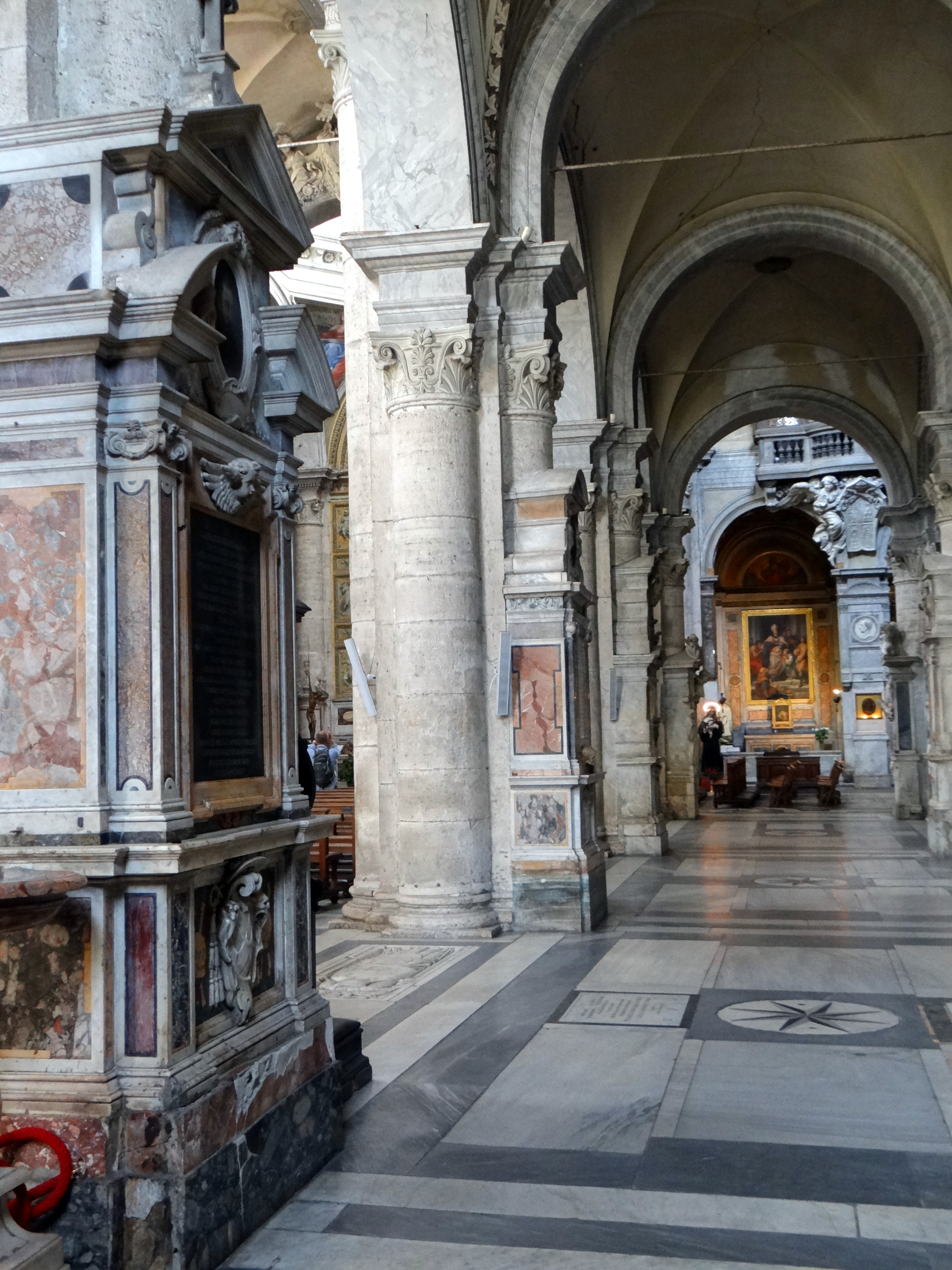
Row of funeral monuments in the south aisle

Monuments in the Basilica of Santa Maria del Popolo are tombs and funerary monuments ranging from the 15th to the 19th centuries. Since its rebuilding in the 1470s by Pope Sixtus IV the Basilica of Santa Maria del Popolo was one of the favourite burial places for members of the papal aristocracy, clergy and literati. Foreign artists were also buried in the church due to its location near their favourite quarter in Rione Campo Marzio. The high number of tombs and monuments makes the basilica a whole museum of sculpture as Jacob Burckhardt phrased it in his famous guide of Italian art in 1855. Besides the tombs in the side chapels and the choir there are many other funeral monuments in the aisles and the transept. During the centuries several monuments were demolished and others were relocated to give place to newer ones.

== Counterfaçade ==
1. Maria Eleonora Boncompagni Ludovisi

To the right of the entrance, on the counterfacade, is the wall tomb of Maria Eleonora I Boncompagni, the sovereign Princess of Piombino. The princess died in 1745 after visiting a hospital. Her tomb was designed by Domenico Gregorini in 1749.

The funeral monument has typically macabre, late Baroque details. The base includes a winged dragon, symbol of the Boncompagni family. The tablet of the epitaph is made of pietre dure. The inscription is surmounted by an allegory of Time (skull in wreath with wings), the coat-of-arms of the Principality of Piombino and two personifications (Charity and Humility). The tablet is set in a white marble frame with a conch in the lower part and a gable at the top with a shell, two flaming torches and another winged skull.

2. Giovanni Battista Gisleni

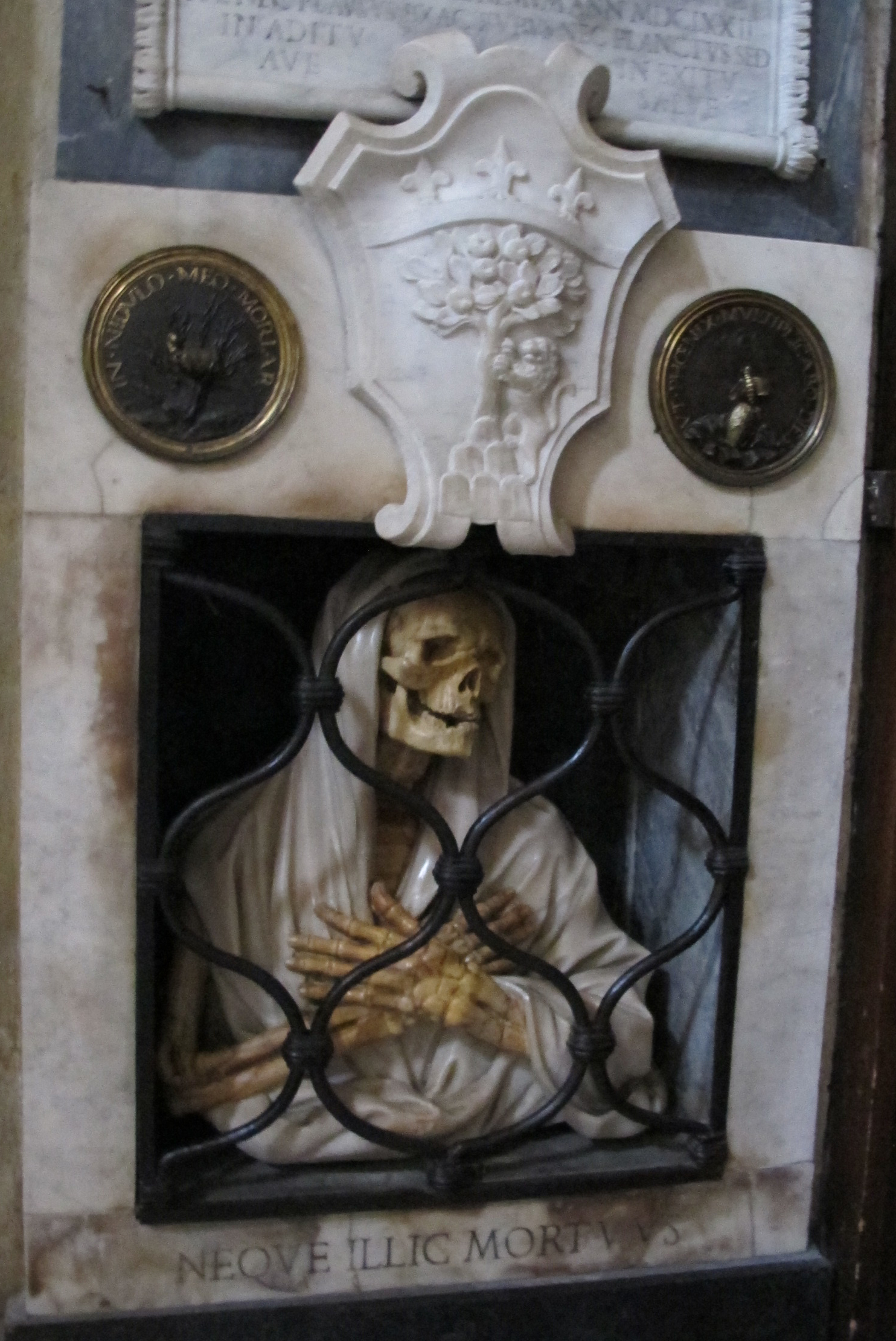
The lower part of the Gisleni monument

The tomb of Giovanni Battista Gisleni, an architect and stage designer who worked for the Polish royal court during 1630–1668, is another rather macabre funeral monument. It is set between a wooden booth and a stone half-column on the right side of the counterfaçade. The memorial was designed and installed by the architect himself in 1670 two years before his death.

The upper part of the monument is a stone tablet with a long inscription and the portrait of the deceased in a tondo which was painted by a Flemish artist, Jacob Ferdinand Voet. There is a painted canopy which is supported by angels on the wall (one of them holding an hourglass, the symbol of Time). The lower part contains a shrouded skeleton, clutching his breast, as he peers through an iron grill window. The stone frame of the window is decorated with a coat-of-arms and two bronze medallions. The left one shows a tree with its branches cut but sprouting new shoots and containing a caterpillar spinning its cocoon, while the right one shows the metamorphosis of the caterpillar into a moth. These are the symbols of death and resurrection. The inscriptions convey the same message: In nidulo meo moriar ("In my nest I die" i.e. in the city of Rome) and Ut phoenix multiplicabo dies ("As a phoenix I multiply my days"). There are two enigmatic inscriptions on the upper and lower part of the monument: Neque hic vivus and Neque illic mortuus ("Neither living here, nor dead there").

On this tomb the skeleton is not the personification of Death as in other Baroque tombs but a representation of the deceased (the transi image) on his way towards the resurrection and due to this "death became a symbol for life".

3. Samuel Rafael Globic

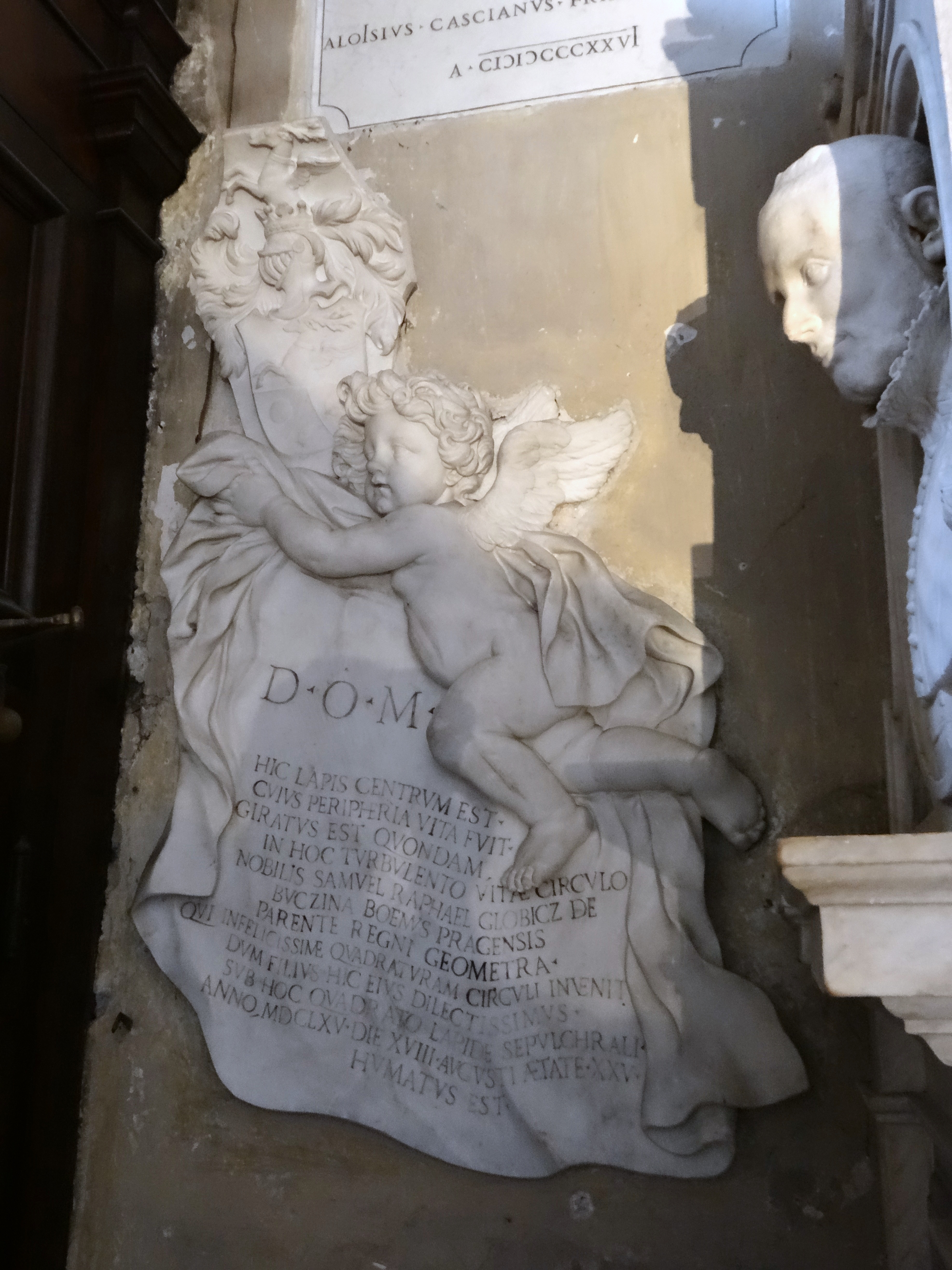
The funeral monument of Samuel Rafael Globic

Samuel Rafael Globic was a young Czech painter who died in Rome in 1665. His small monument is hidden in the corner of the counterfaçade near the wooden entrance booth. Its cryptic inscription remains an unsolved mystery. A putto is carrying the family coat-of-arms and a rippling drapery. The wavy lines of the Latin inscription declare: "This stone is the centre, the periphery of which was a life, that the noble Samuel Raphael Globicz de Buczina of Prague in Bohemia once orbited in this turbulent circle of living, whose parent was a royal surveyor, who unhappily discovered the squaring of the circle [infelicissime quadraturam circuli invenit], when his precious son was buried under this square tombstone in 1665 on 18 August at the age of 25 years."

The parent was Samuel Globic, royal surveyor of Bohemia, who probably designed the monument for his son. Nobody knows the exact meaning of the most enigmatic part of the epitaph which refers to squaring the circle.

4. Cristiana Duglioli Angelelli

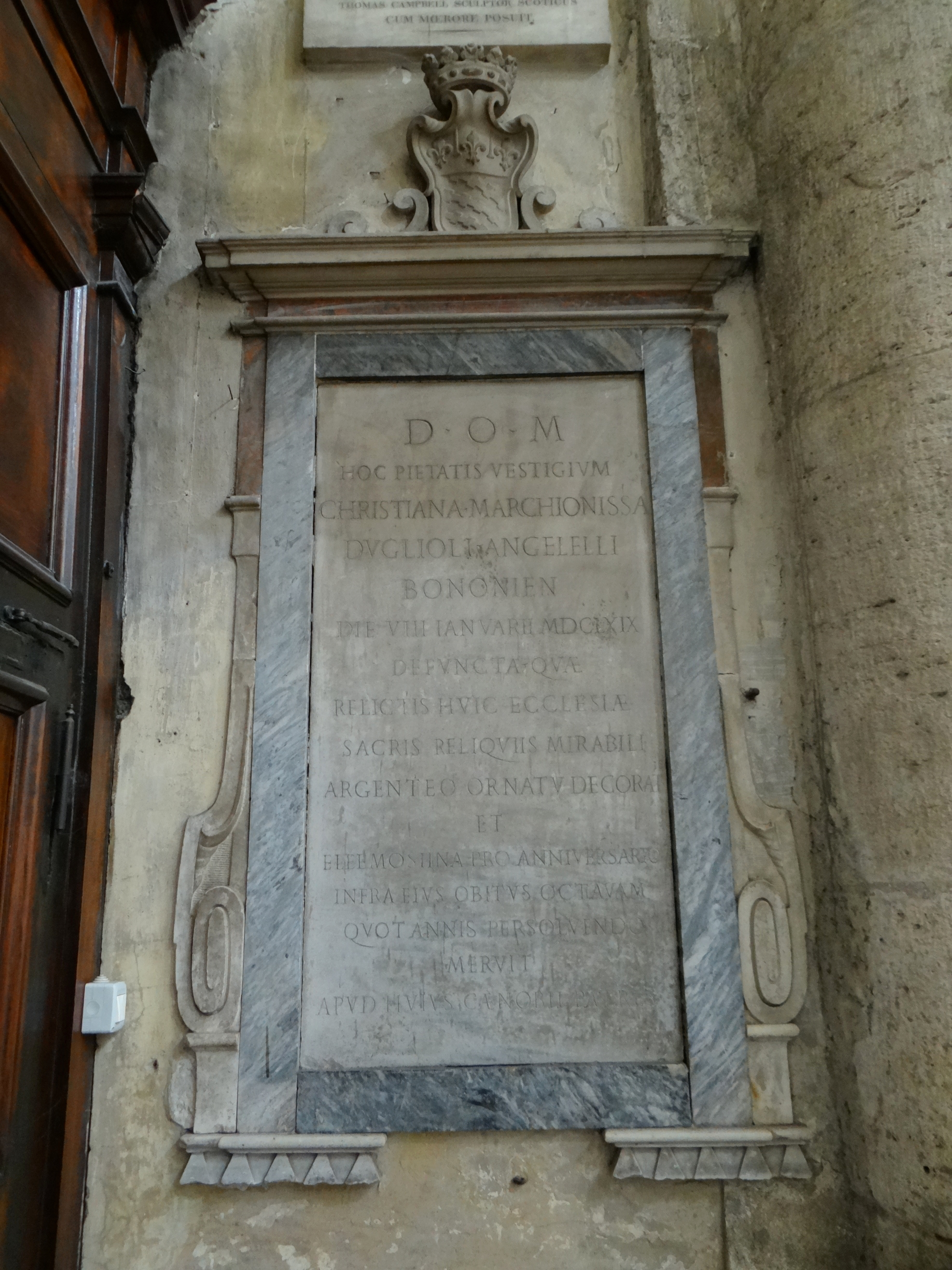
The monument of Cristiana Duglioli Angelelli

The monument of Marquise Cristiana Duglioli Angelelli is set in the wall of the counterfaçade. This noble woman from Bologna was the widow of Senator Andrea Angelelli. After her husband's murder in 1643 she settled in Rome where she patronized the leading artists of the era. The marquise, who moved in the highest circles of the Roman society, established a famous art collection in her palace. She died in 1669 leaving some precious relics and alms to the monastery.

The monument is a simple slab of white marble in a grey marble frame. It is flanked by slim volutes and crowned with a strong architrave. The marble coat-of-arms of the Duglioli family rest on top of the lintel.

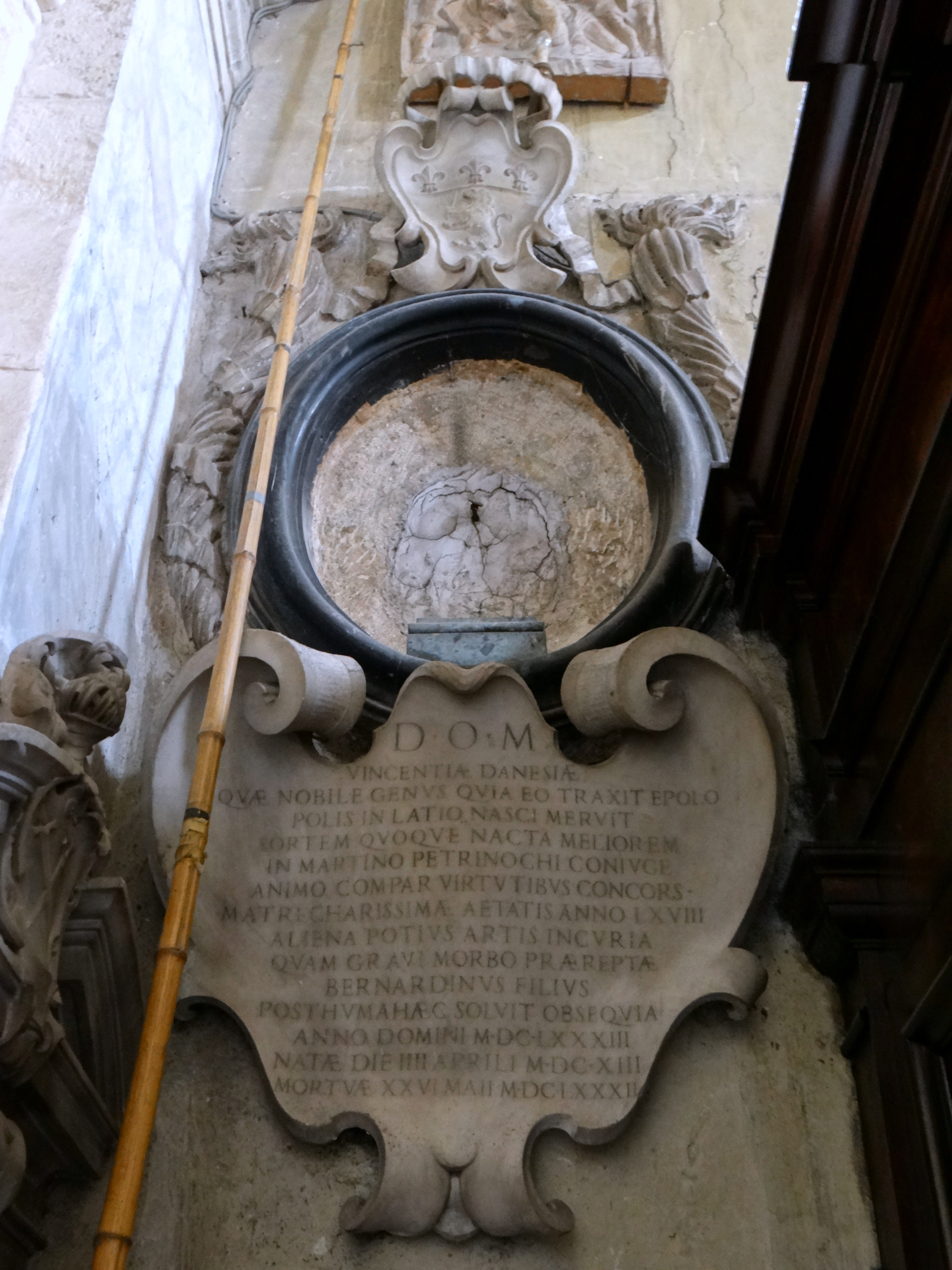
The monument of Vincenza Danesi

5. Vincenza Danesi

The monument consists of a mixtilinear cartouche with scrolls, a black marble niche for the portrait of the deceased, flanked by two flaming stucco torches, and the coat-of-arms. The niche is empty but the presence of a small plinth reveals that originally it contained a bust. The noble lady died in 1682 at the age of 68. The monument was erected by her son, Bernardino Petrinochi for the "dearest mother" in 1683. The epitaph claims that "her premature death was caused not by serious illness but by someone's neglect of his art".

6. Vincenzo Bonadies

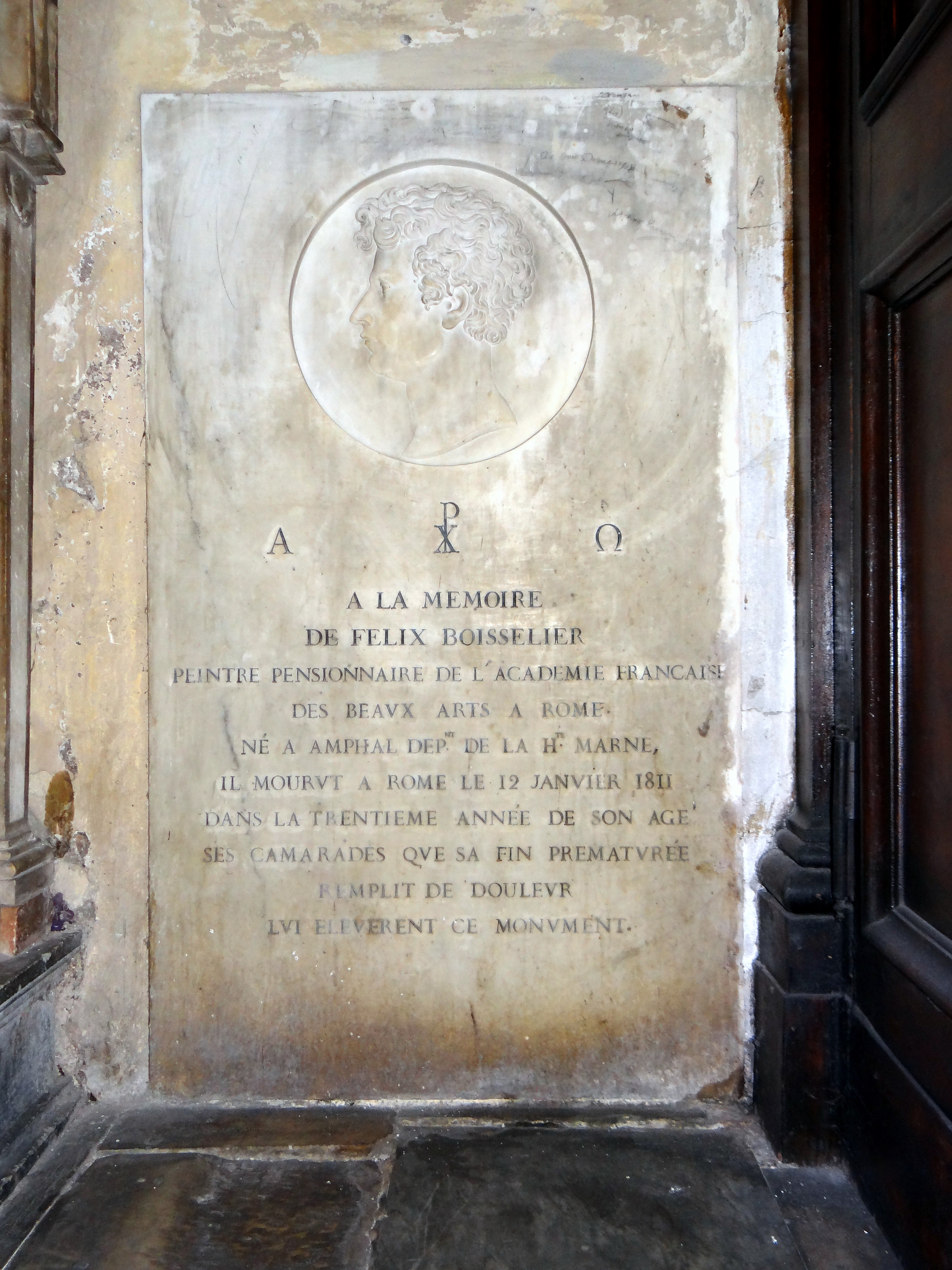
The stele of Félix Boisselier

"A young man of great hopes and sweet manners", Vincenzo Bonadies was buried in the church in 1677. His small monument is similar to that of Samuel Rafael Globic, hidden in a nook in the other side of the counterfaçade. The chubby Baroque angel is holding a rippling drapery with the epitaph and the coat-of-arms of the family. It was erected by the youngster's grieving father, Baldassare Bonadies.

7. Félix Boisselier

The stele of Félix Boisselier is set in the wall of the counterfaçade. The French historical painter was a pensionary of the French Academy in Rome and died at the age of 34 years in 1811. The monument was erected by "his comrades whose hearts were filled with pain at his premature death", according to the French inscription. The stone slab is decorated with Boisselier's classicising portrait in relief.

A tablet on the counterfaçade serves as a memorial to another Frenchman, Philibert Hugonet, the Cardinal of Mâcon, who was a prominent member in the court of Burgundy and the Roman Curia in the 1470s. He was buried in the church in 1484 but left without a funeral monument. The tablet was placed on the wall by Colonel Hugon d'Augicourt, Chief of Staff of the French division in Rome, on 20 September 1855.

== North aisle ==
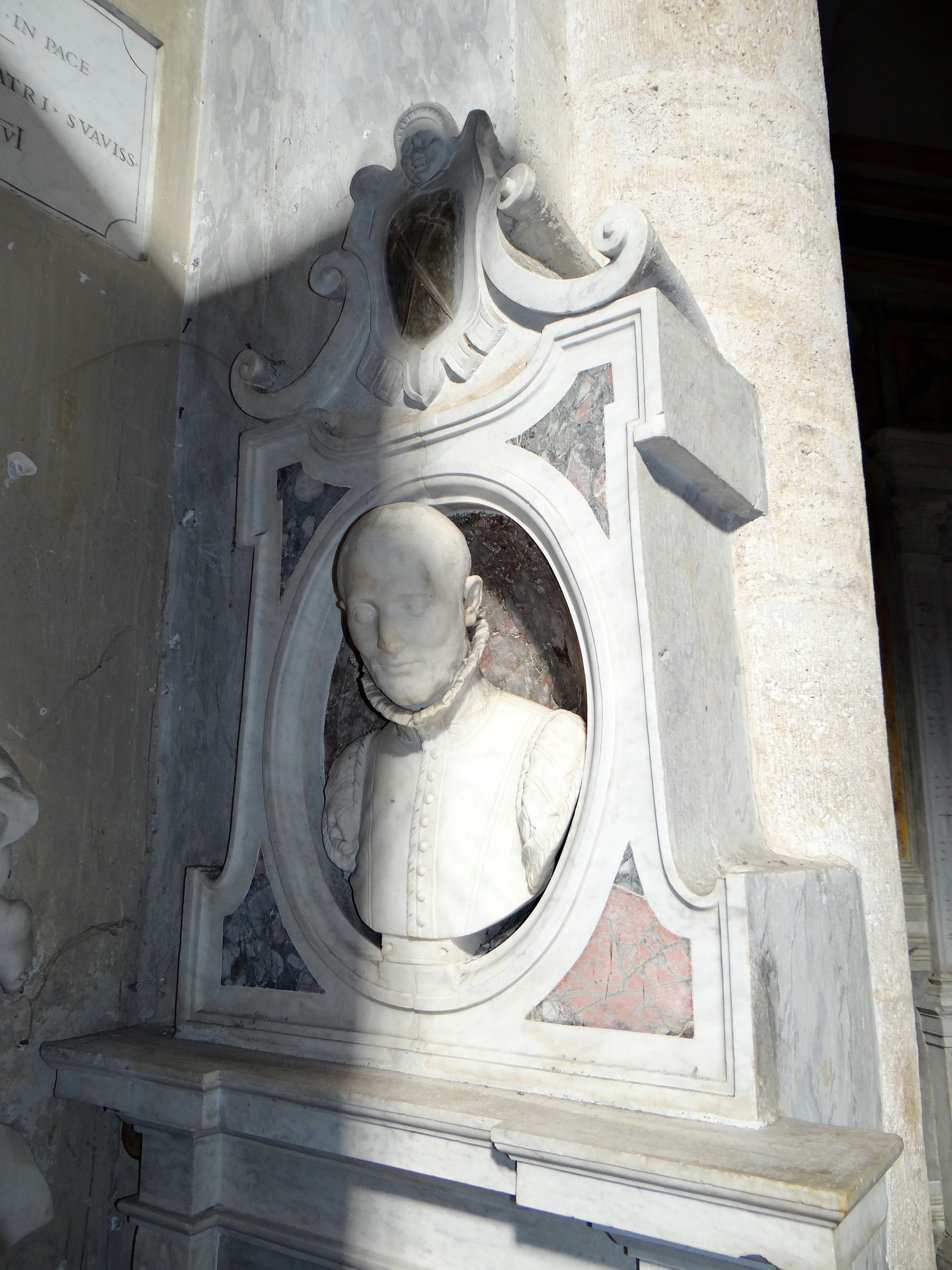
The portrait of Stefano Spada

1. Stefano Spada

The monument of Stefano Spada, a young nobleman from Lucca who died at the age of 24 years, suffers from its unfavourable location near the first pillar of the Montemirabile Chapel (originally it stood by the counterfaçade). The white marble aedicula was erected sometime after the death of Spada in 1563. It is decorated with the bust of the deceased in an oval niche and the coat-of-arms of the Spada family (two crossed swords). The exquisitely carved bust with the sad, dreaming expression is an excellent example of Renaissance portraiture. The design and construction was attributed to Domenico Poggini by Grisebach but the authorship remains uncertain.

2. Maria Flaminia Odescalchi Chigi

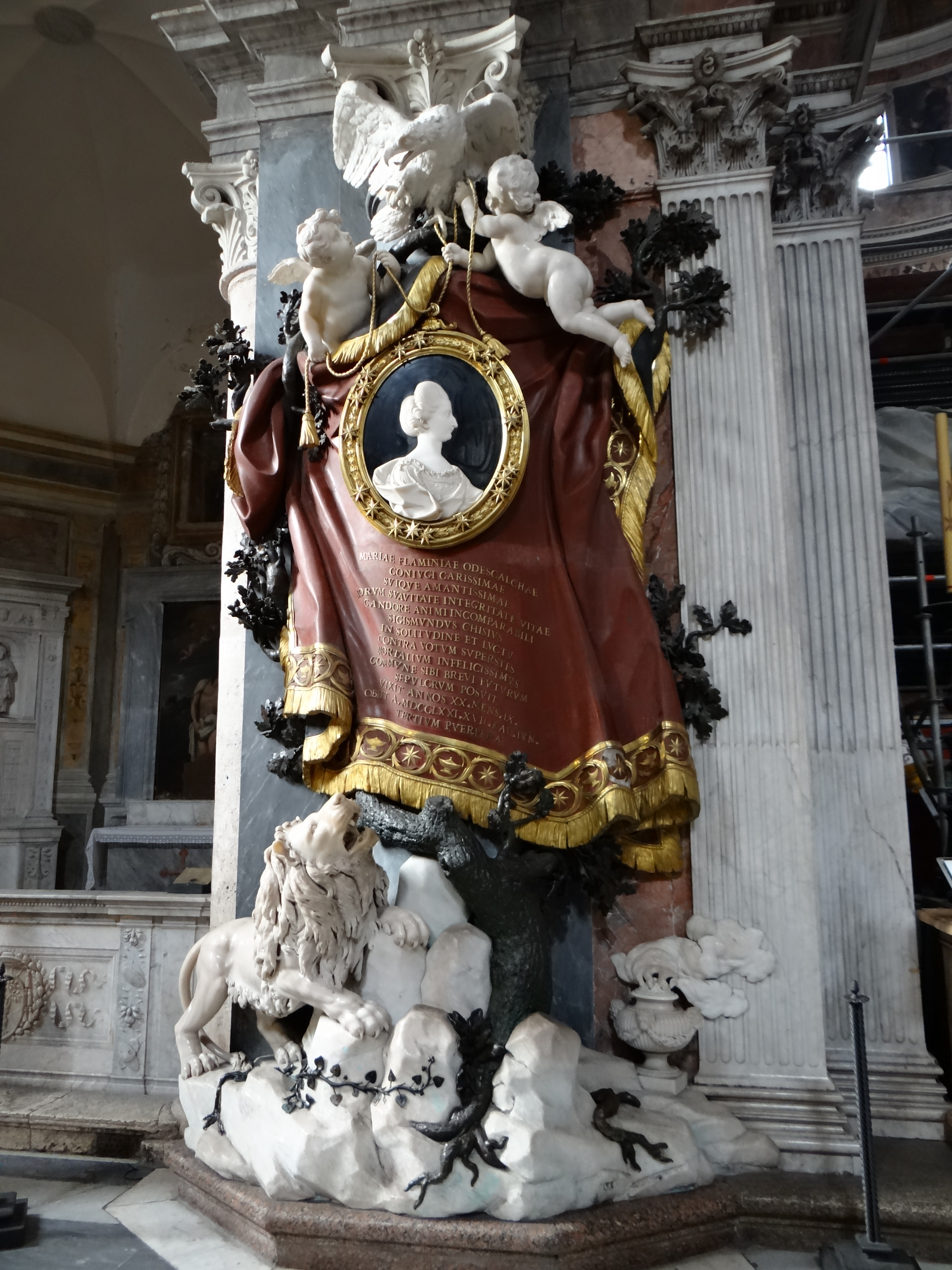
Monument of Maria Flaminia Odescalchi Chigi

The funerary monument of Princess Maria Flaminia Odescalchi Chigi is sometimes dubbed the "last Baroque tomb in Rome". It is probably the most visually stunning, exuberant and theatrical sepulchral monument in the basilica. It was built in 1772 for the young princess, the first wife of Don Sigismondo Chigi Albani della Rovere, the 4th Prince of Farnese, who died in childbirth at the age of 20. It was designed by Paolo Posi, a Baroque architect who was famous for his ephemeral celebratory architecture, and executed by Agostino Penna. The tomb is located by the pillar between the Chigi and Montemirabile Chapels.

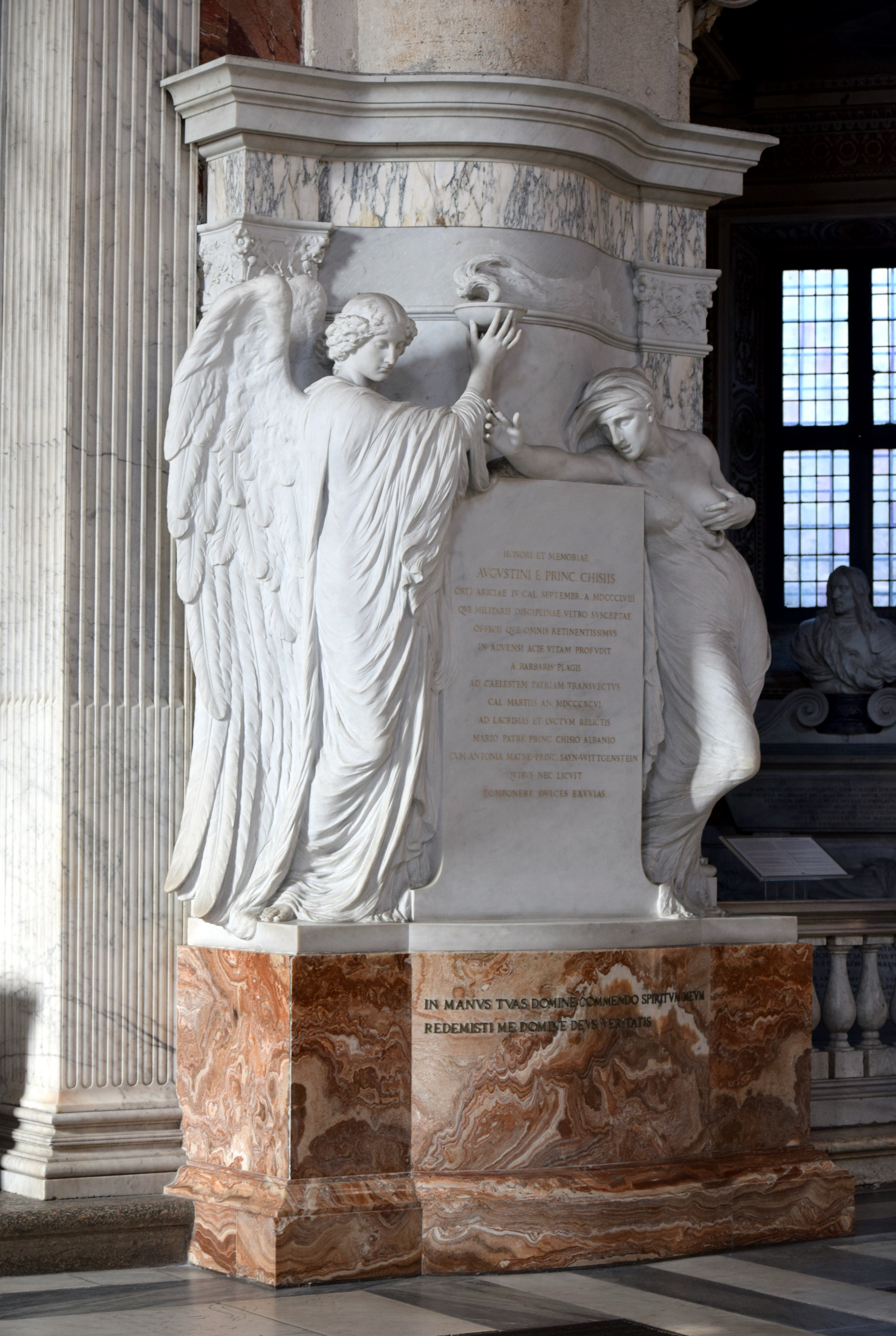
Monument of Prince Agostino Chigi

The monument shows the influence of Bernini's memorial to Maria Raggi in Santa Maria sopra Minerva. Posi used the heraldic symbols of the Chigi and the Odescalchi to celebrate the intertwining of the two princely families. In the lower part of the monument a white marble Odescalchi lion is climbing a mountain of the Chigi; to the right a smoking incense burner alludes to the Odescalchis again. A gnarled bronze oak tree (Chigi) grows from the mountain with a huge red marble robe hanging on its branches. The robe is hemmed with gold and decorated with an epitaph made of golden letters and also the stars of the Chigi and the incense burners of the Odescalchi at the lower part. In the upper part of the tomb a white marble eagle and two angels are carrying the black and white marble portrait of deceased which is set in a richly decorated golden medaillon.

In the 19th century the monument was dismissed as tawdry. Stendhal called it an "outburst of the execrable taste of the 18th century" in his 1827 Promenades dans Rome.

3. Agostino Chigi

On the pillar between the Chigi and the Mellini Chapel is a Late Neo-Classical monument for the memory of Lieutenant Agostino Chigi (1858–1896), the first son of Prince Mario Chigi, who died in the Battle of Adwa in the First Italo-Ethiopian War. It was designed by Adolfo Apolloni in 1915. The shape of the gleaming white marble sepulchre follows the curve of the half-column behind. The stele of the inscription is flanked by two half-pillars with interesting Liberty style capitals of flowers and poppy-heads and two allegorical statues, the personifications of earthly and eternal life; the latter appearing as a serene angel holding up a burning lamp.

4. Francesco Mantica

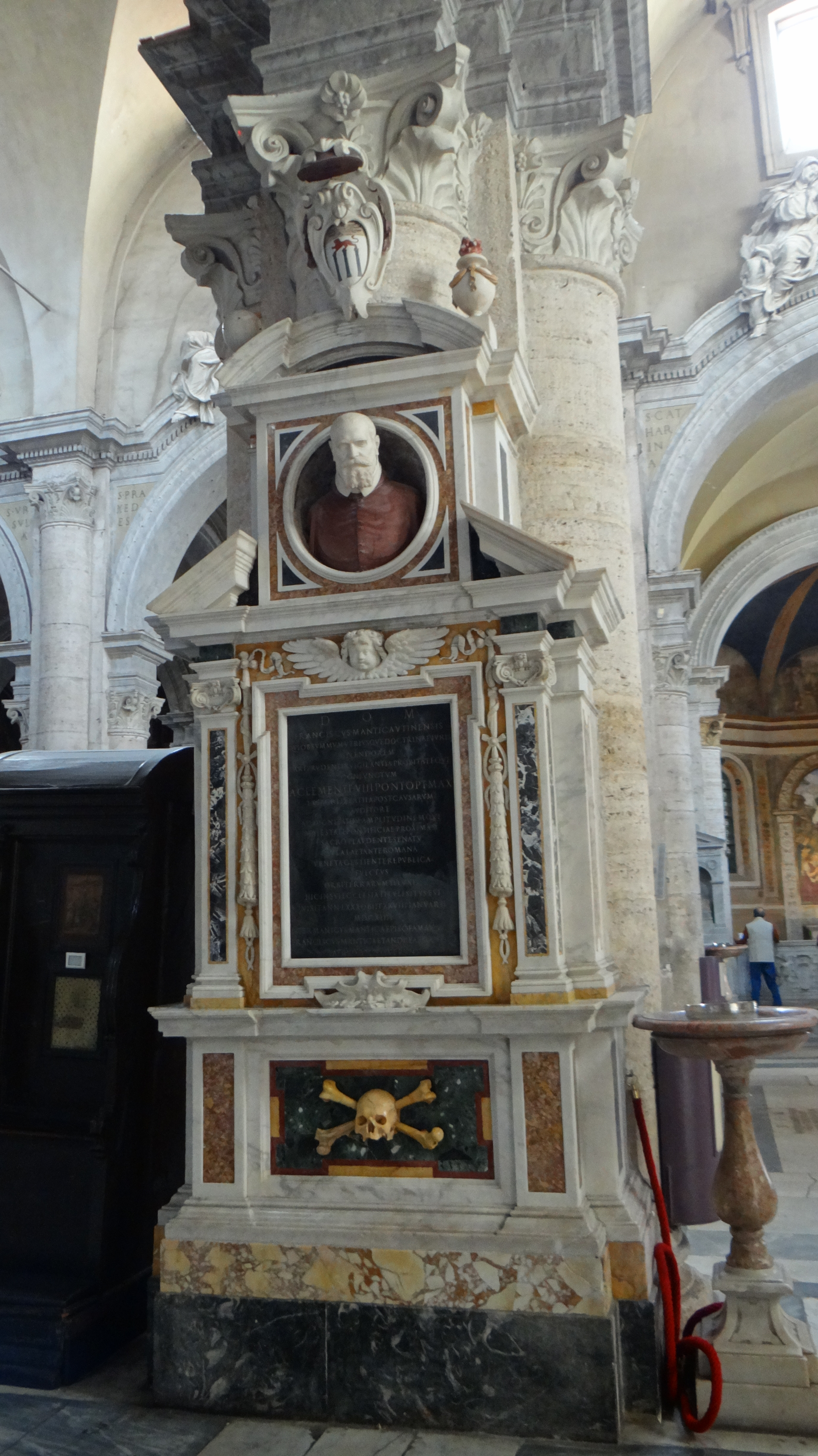
Monument of Cardinal Francesco Mantica

The monument of Francesco Mantica, Cardinal-Priest of Santa Maria del Popolo (who died in 1614) is by the first pillar of the nave in front of the Montemirabile Chapel. The Baroque aedicula was built of white and coloured marbles. The base is decorated with the symbol of death, the skull and crossbones, carved from yellow stone. The table of the inscription is framed by Ionic pilasters and surmounted by an angel of white marble. The frame is decorated with strings of bay leaves tied with ribbons and tassels. In the upper part of the sepulchre the bust of deceased is set in a round niche. The tomb is crowned with an arched pediment, the coat-of-arms of the Cardinal and two flaming urns.

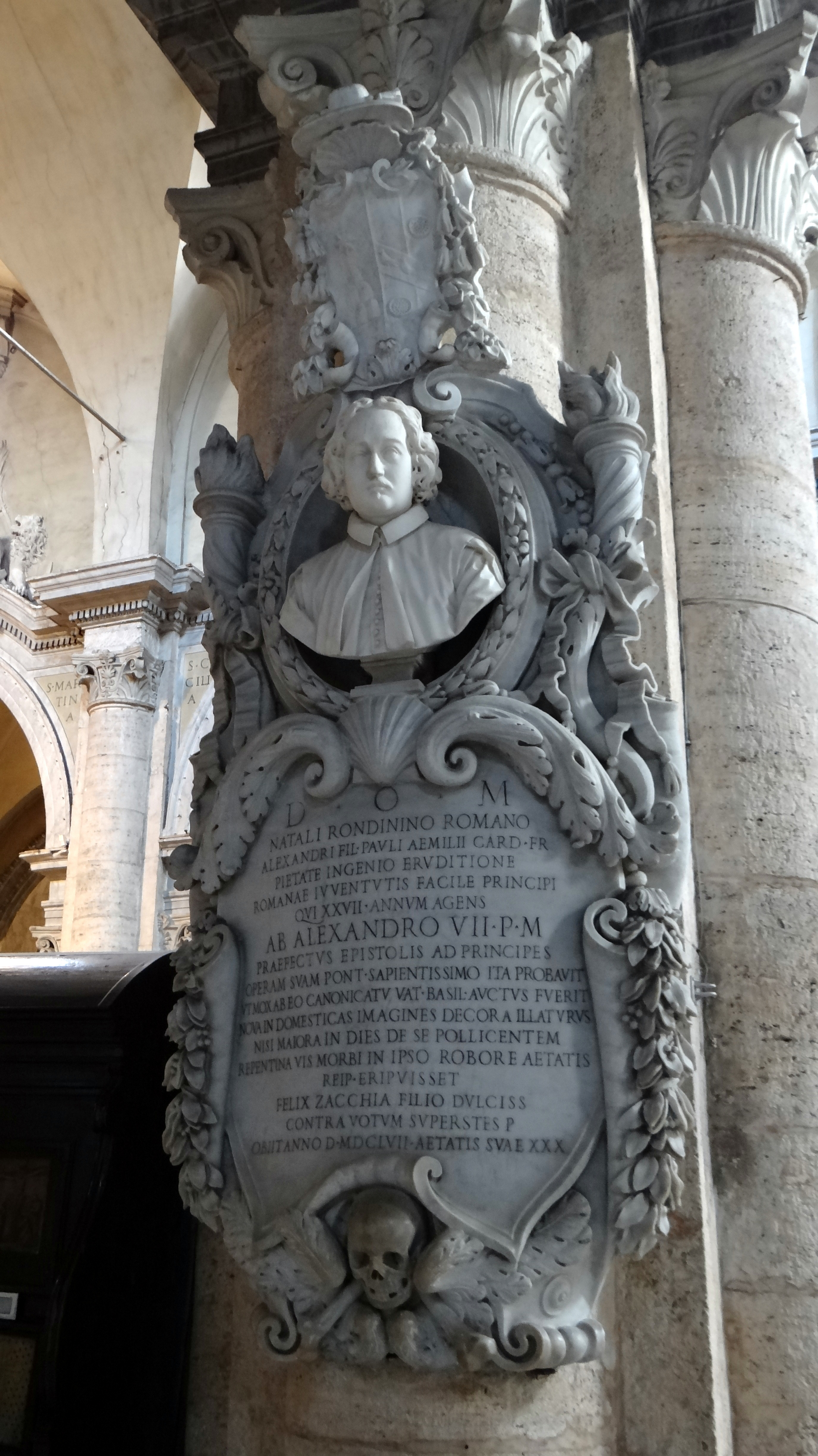
Monument of Natale Rondinini

5. Natale Rondinini

Natale Rondinini served as secretary of Pope Alexander VII until his early death at the age of thirty in 1657. His funeral monument was designed by Domenico Guidi, probably the most prolific sculptor of seicento Rome. It is attached to the second pillar of the nave on the left. The richly decorated Baroque monument is made up of the table of the inscription, the bust of the deceased in a round niche and the coat-of-arms of Rondinini at the top. The plaque is framed by leafy garlands and crowned by a shell which is set between two acanthus scrolls. The symbol of Death, the skull and crossbones rears under the plaque folding up the crest. The edge of the central niche is decorated with a string of bay leaves and the niche itself is flanked by two flaming urns tied with wide ribbons. The coats-of-arms are crowned with a bishop's hat and a conch.

6. Alessandro Maggi

The tomb of Alessandro Maggi is located on the pillar between the Mellini and the Cybo-Soderini Chapel. Maggi was a jurist from Bologna who pursued a career in the Roman Curia. He was an acclaimed writer and humanist who belonged to the circle of friends around Cardinal Bonifacio Bevilacqua. Around 1603 he served as a Vice-Legate in Perugia substituting the Cardinal. Alessandro Maggi died in 1619. His tomb was erected by Cardinal Bevilacqua and his brother, Giovanni Maggi. The sepulchre is a typical Baroque tomb in the form of a tripartite aedicula. It was built of white and coloured marbles. The base is decorated with the coat-of-arms, the middle part with the table of the eulogic inscription is flanked by Ionic pilasters and the top is crowned with an arched gable, two volutes, the sculpted head of an angel and a painted portrait of the deceased. There is a smaller 19th century monument for Maria Luisa Placchesi Ceccareli on the same pillar with the relief portraits of her and her husband.

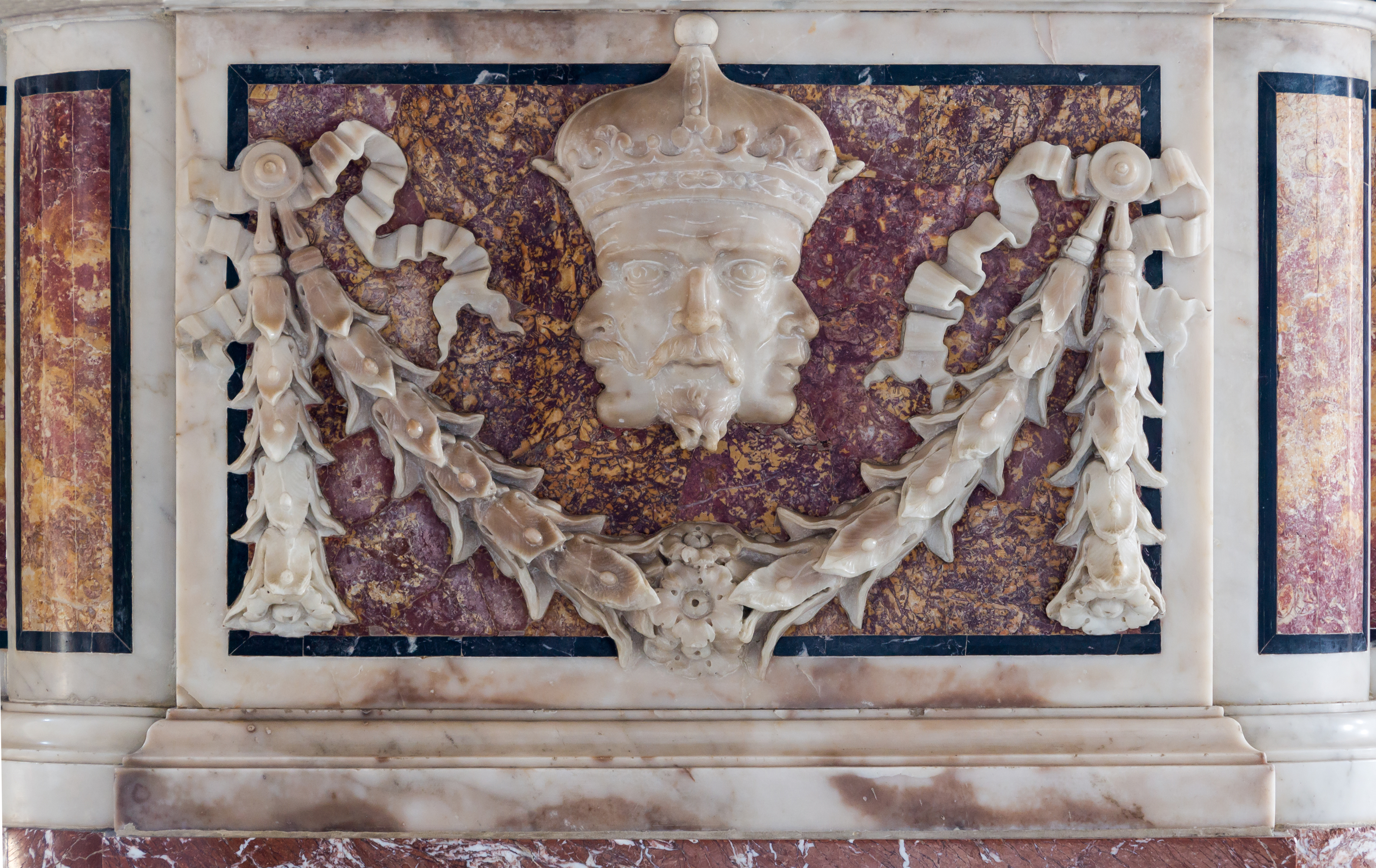
Relief of the head with three faces on the tomb of the Trivulzio cardinals

7. The Trivulzio cardinals

Two distinguished member of the Milanese Trivulzio family were buried in the basilica in the 16th century: Giovanni Antonio, the Cardinal of Como (†1508) and Cardinal Agostino (†1548). However their shared tomb on a pillar of the left aisle is a much later work which was erected by their relative, Cardinal Gian Giacomo Teodoro Trivulzio in 1654 for the memory of the "great-uncles" (magnis patruis) as the inscription says.

The tomb of the Trivulzio cardinals is a Baroque aedicula built of richly coloured marbles. The base is decorated with a garland of leaves and flowers and a head with three faces, a probably a rare representation of the Holy Trinity. The central part with the table of the inscription made of pietre dure is flanked by slim volutes. The yellow stone frame of the panel is decorated with a conch and a badge (a red cross in a radiating sun). The monument is crowned with an arched broken pediment and the coat-of-arms of the Trivulzio family (green and yellow stripes) but there are no busts for the deceased persons.

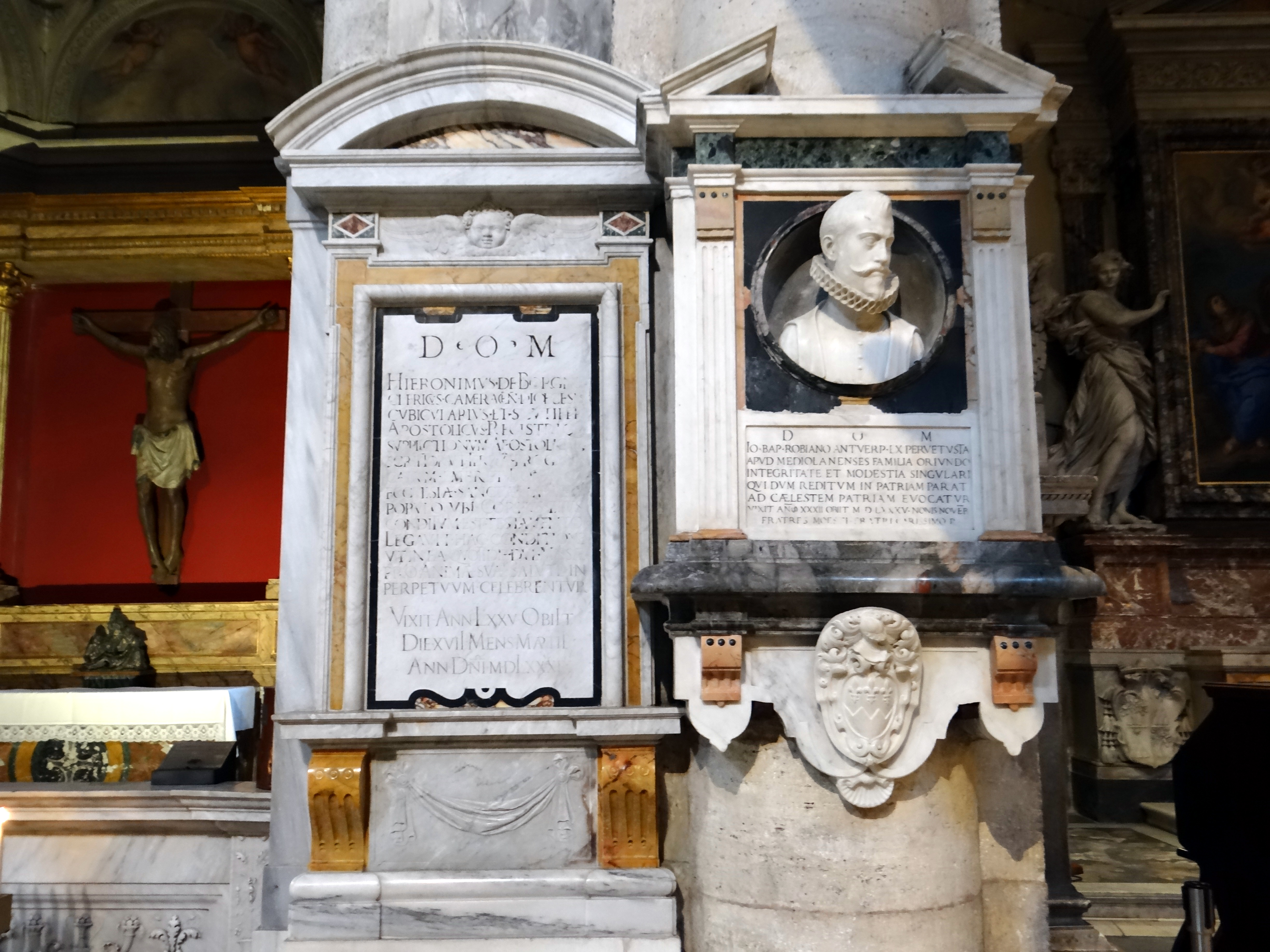
The monuments of Geronimo de Borgne and Giovanni Batttista Robiano

8. Giovanni Battista Robiano

The monument of Giovanni Battista Robiano from Antwerp is located on the pillar right outside the Cybo-Soderini Chapel. Robiano, scion of an ancient and noble Milanese family who had settled in the Netherlands, died at the age of 32 in 1585 at the time when "he was going to return to his motherland". The funeral monument is probably the work of a Flemish sculptor, Niccolò Pippi d'Arras (Nicolas Mostaert). The late Renaissance aedicula was built of coloured marbles. It is supported by two smallish corbels and crowned with a broken pediment. The round central niche with the bust of the deceased is flanked by fluted pilasters. The lower part is decorated with the Robiano coat-of-arms (3 fleurs-de-lis and dancetty).

9. Geronimo de Borgne

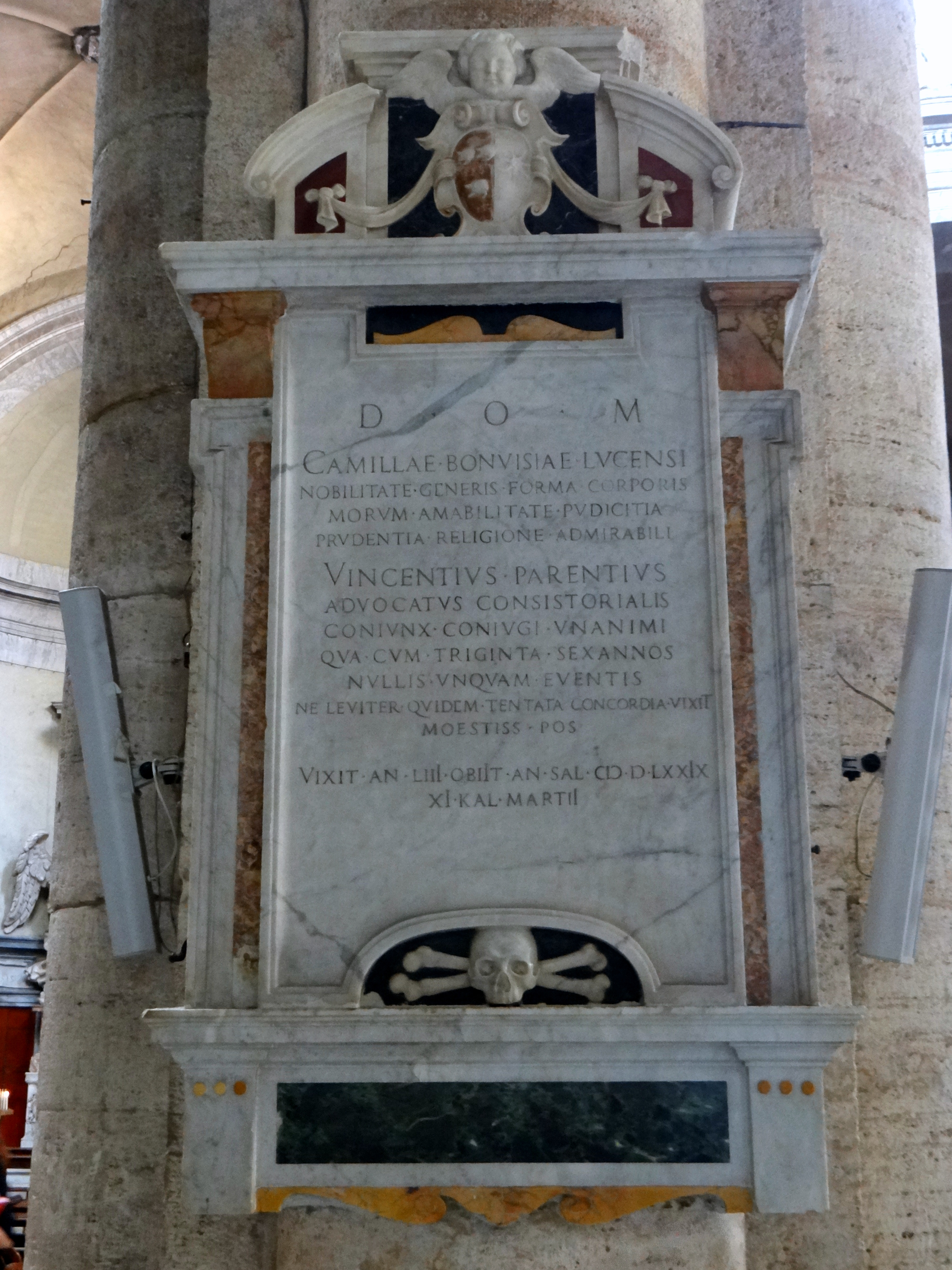
The monument of Camilla Buonvisi

Another Renaissance monument on the same pillar is composed of a single table of inscription set in a coloured marble aedicula which is crowned by an arched pediment. The only sculpted parts are the upper frieze with the finely carved head of a winged cherub and a folded drapery in low relief between the giallo antico corbels of the lower part. The simple monument was built for Geronimo de Borgne, a priest from the Diocese of Cambrai who held the positions of cubicularius, scutifer and scriptor in the Roman Curia. He left some of his wealth to the basilica with the condition of celebrating two masses for the salvation of his soul every day. He died in 1589 at the age of 75 years.

10. Camilla Buonvisi

The monument on the last pillar of the north aisle was dedicated to Camilla Buonvisi from Lucca by his husband, Vincenzo Parenzi. It is made of coloured marbles. The stone plaque is decorated with the Parenzi-Buonvisi coat-of-arms in the gable and the skull and crossbones at lower part. There is a winged cherub above the escutcheon. The long inscription states that Parenzi, a consistorial advocate "has lived with her for thirty years in a variety of events, yet without the least breach or interruption of perfect harmony". The noble lady died in 1579 at the age of 53 years.

== South aisle ==
1. Giovanni Battista Spada

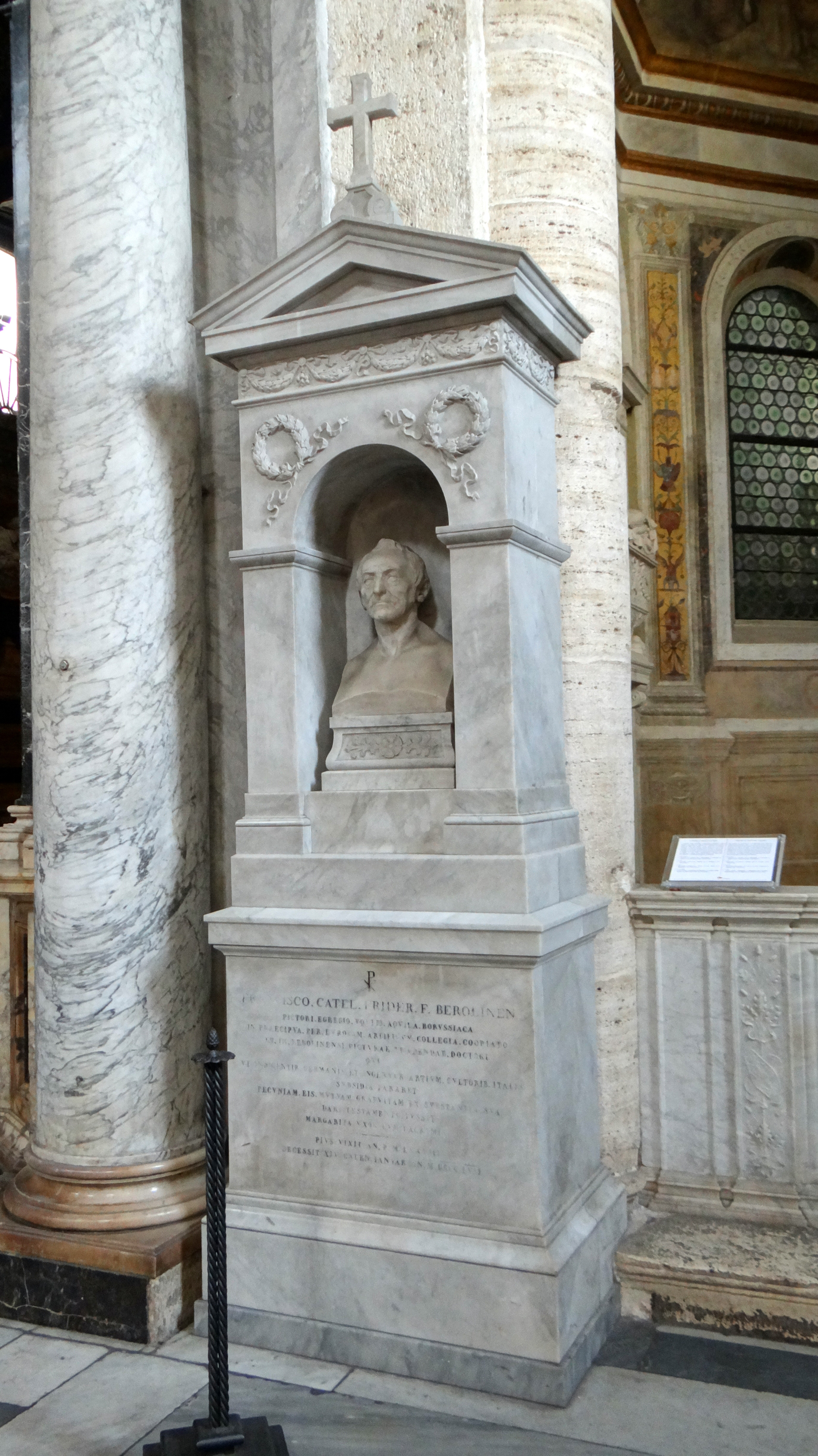
The tomb of Franz Ludwig Catel

Giovanni Battista Spada senior (1555–1623) was a prominent and respected jurist. The scion of a patrician family from Lucca, he became a consistorial lawyer, Lawyer of the Apostolic Chamber, and of the Treasury in the Roman Curia. He served under Pope Clement VIII in the newly conquered city of Ferrara, and mentored his nephew, Giambattista who later reached the Cardinalate. Spada died in 1623 at the age of 68.

His tomb is similar to an earlier Spada tomb in the left-hand corner of the counterfaçade, the memorial of Stefano Spada. The location of these tombs is unfavourable, and Giovanni Battista Spada's memorial was vandalized: the bust of the deceased is missing and the oval niche was filled with plaster. The Baroque aedicula is composed of coloured (white, black and brown) marbles. There is a carved drapery under the table of the inscription, the central niche is framed by scrolls with a winged head of an angel at its lower part, two volutes, and it is crowned with an arched gable. The top is decorated with the coat-of-arms of the Spada family (two crossed swords).

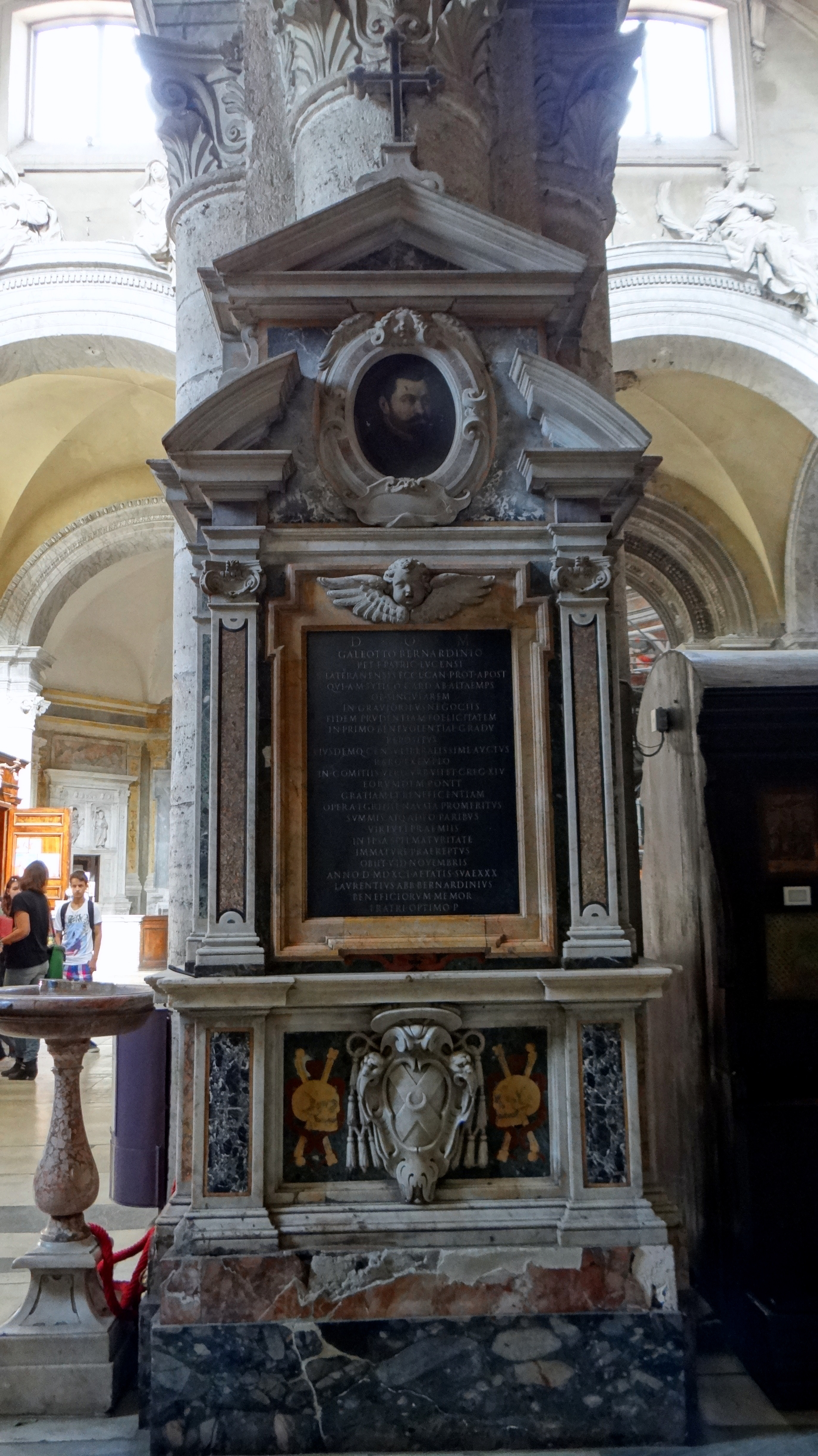
The tomb of Galeotto Bernardini

2. Franz Ludwig Catel

The monument of a Prussian painter, Franz Ludwig Catel was erected by the pillar between the Della Rovere and Cybo Chapels. Catel was a successful landscape and genre painter who spent most of his career in Rome. He lived nearby in Piazza di Spagna where his home became a favourite meeting place for young artists. He died in 1856 at the age of 78 years and left his estate to a foundation which he had set up to help young German and Italian artists in the city. His monument was designed by a fellow German sculptor, Julius Troschel. The white marble Neo-Classical aedicula is decorated with a frieze of garlands and two wreathes and it is crowned by a pediment and a cross. The realistic bust of the deceased is set in a niche in the middle. The epitaph mentions his noble intention to leave most of his fortune to the artists in need.

3. Galeotto Bernardini

The tomb of Galeotto Bernardini, patrician from Lucca and protonotary apostolic, on the first pillar of the south aisle belongs to the group of elaborate Baroque funeral monuments. Bernardini died in 1591 at the age of 30. The epitaph mentions that he was a trusted confidant of Cardinal Marco Sittico Altemps, and he served with distinction under Popes Urban VII and Gregory XIV. The sepulchre was erected by the late protonotary's brother, Lorenzo Bernardini.

The early Baroque funeral monument is composed of coloured marbles (white, black, yellow and brown). The lower part is decorated with the Bernardini coat-of-arms, carved in white marble, and two skulls-and-crossbones in pietre dure. In the middle the table of the inscription is flanked by two pilasters of Ionic modern capitals; and there is a winged angel above the table. The two tiered gable is composed of a broken arched pediment and a triangular pediment with a cross on top of it. The broken pediment contains the portrait of the deceased; the oil painting is set in a richly carved oval frame.

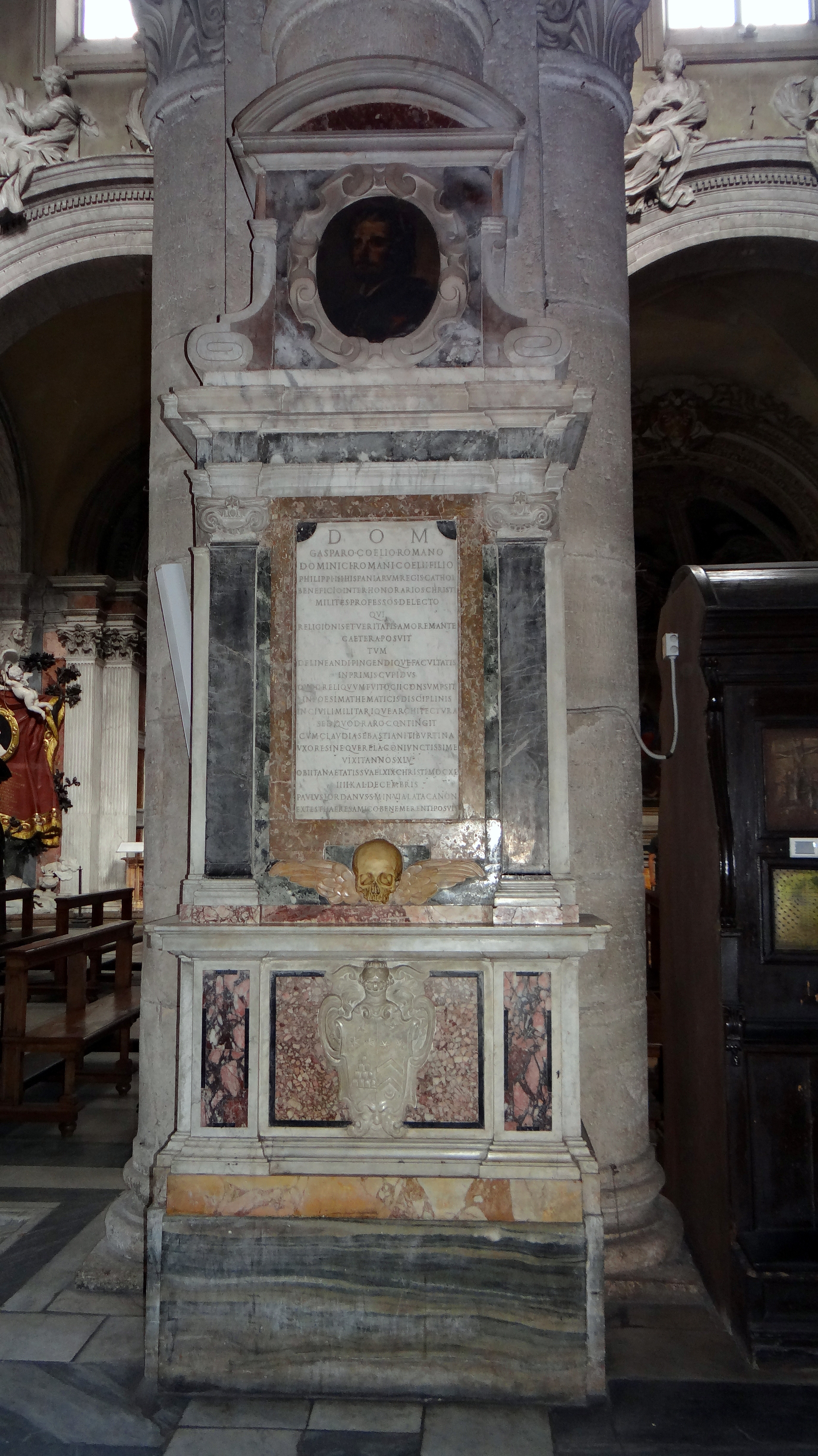
The tomb of Gaspare Celio

4. Adele Julien

The finely carved Neo-Classical monument on the pillar between the Cybo and the Basso Della Rovere Chapel belongs to a Roman noblewoman, Adele Julien (1820–1860) whose bust is attributed to Pietro Tenerani, the leading Roman artist of the purist movement.

The white marble sepulchre is crowned with an arched gable; the lunette is filled with a shell. The central part of the monument with the oval niche of the bust is flanked with Corinthian half-columns; the lower part of their shafts is richly decorated. The base is also covered with a filigree of vegetal carvings.

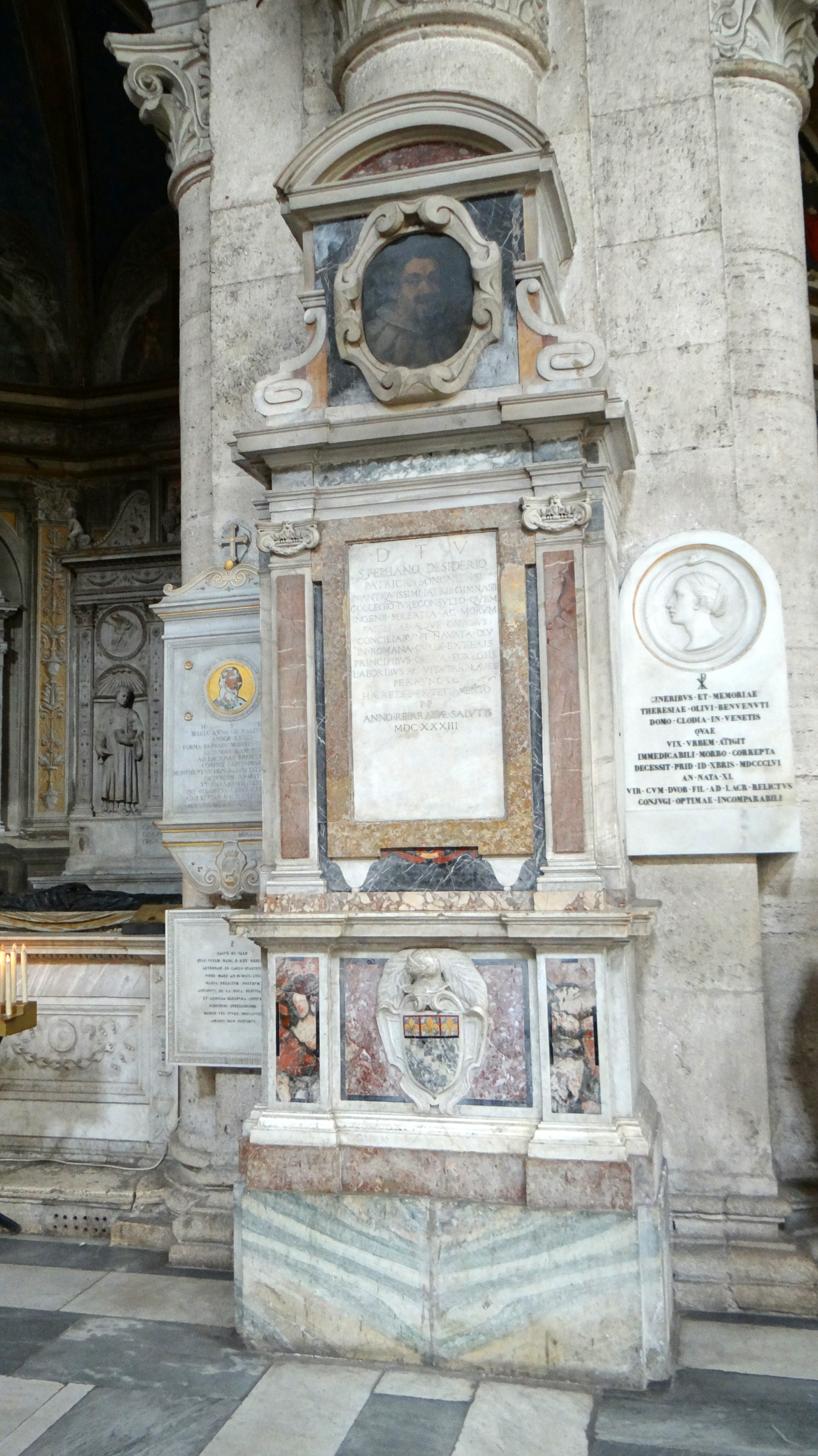
The tomb of Stefano Desiderio with the steles of Teresa Olivi Benvenuti and Maria Anna de Magistris.

5. Gaspare Celio

The tomb of Gaspare Celio is set against the second pillar of the south aisle. Celio was a Roman painter in the Baroque period who died in 1640 at the age of 69 years. According to his contemporaries he was a rather dubious and quarrelsome character but the epigraph claims that besides drawing and painting he excelled in poetry, mathematics, military and civil architecture. He was especially proud of being a knight of the Portuguese Order of Christ, and that he lived together with his wife, Claudia Sebastiani without marital strife for 45 years.

The Baroque monument is shaped like an aedicula and it was composed of coloured marbles. The central part with the inscription is flanked by composite pilasters and decorated with the symbol of death, a winged skull, carved from yellow stone. The upper part is defined by two volutes and crowned by an arched pediment. It contains the portrait of the deceased. The oil painting, which is work of Francesco Ragusa, is set in a voluted stucco frame. The base is decorated with the coat-of-arms.

6. Stefano Desiderio

Located between the Basso della Rovere and Costa Chapels, the monument of Stefano Desiderio, a patrician and lawyer from Bologna, is almost identical to the tomb of Gaspare Celio except the missing skull motif. Desiderio served for a long time in the Roman Curia. His tomb was erected by his heirs in 1638.

7. Teresa Olivi Benvenuti

A small white marble memorial stele on the same pillar was erected for Teresa Olivi Benvenuti, a woman from Chioggia and granddaughter of the naturalist, Giuseppe Olivi. She died in 1856 at the age of 40 years. Her delicate relief portrait in profile above the funerary inscription is surrounded by an ouroboros. The third monument on the same pillar is a memorial stele of Maria Anna de Magistris (1856).

8. Bishop Masci

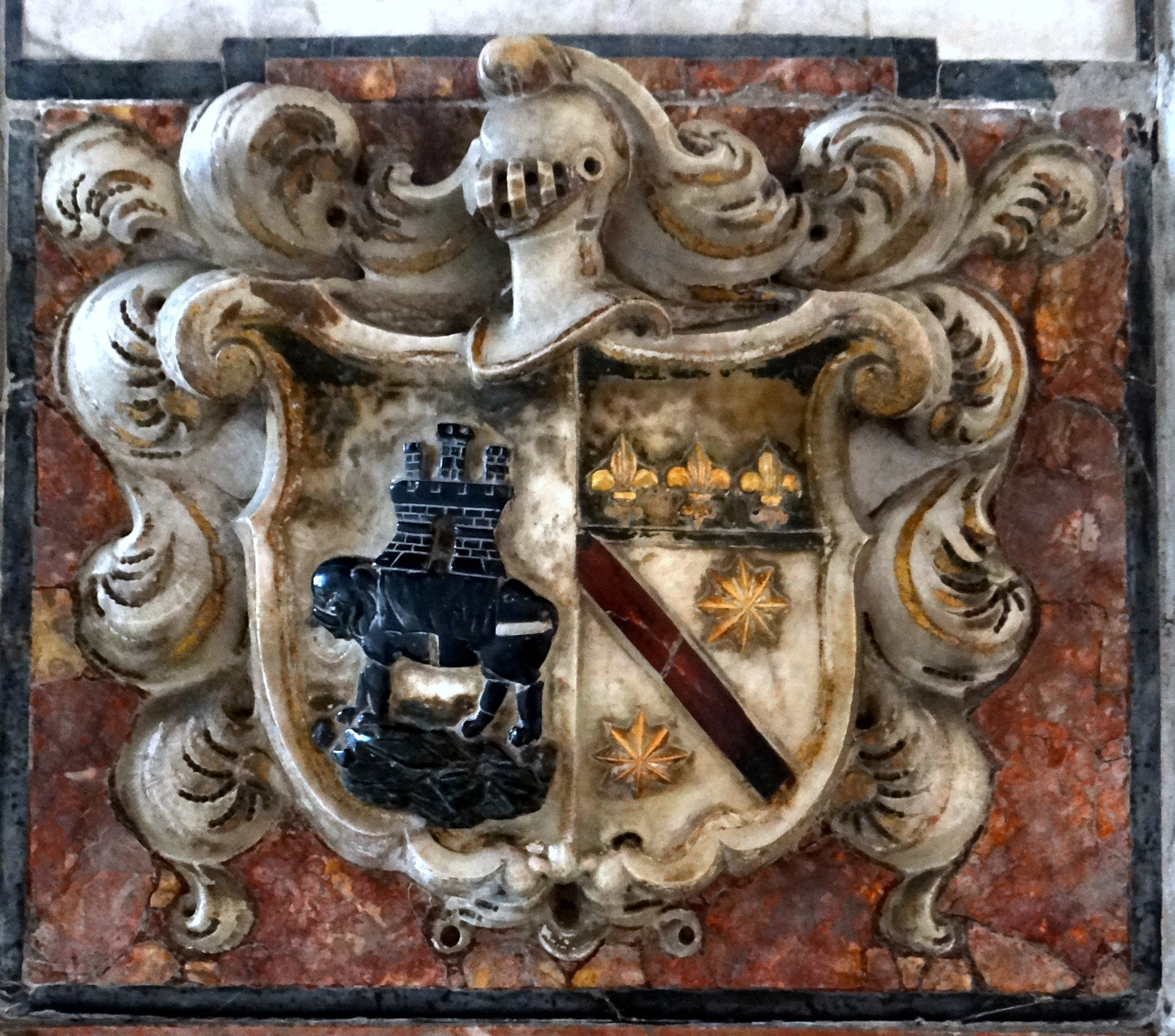
The Elefantucci-Masci arms on the tomb of Bishop Masci

This elaborate Baroque monument set against the third pillar of the south aisle has several peculiarities. It is crowned by the coat-of-arms of Pope Nicholas IV (Girolamo Masci) but this medieval pope was buried in the Basilica of Santa Maria Maggiore. The monument in Santa Maria del Popolo was built for his late descendant, Count Masci-Ferracuti from Ascoli Piceno who was appointed to the Bishop of Vieste by Pope Sixtus V in 1589. He died in Rome in 1613 at the age of 60 years. He was buried with solemn pomp in a marble tomb in the basilica. The tomb was built by her niece, Anastasia Mascia and her husband, Marzio Elefantucci, a nobleman from Bologna. Under the pretense of honouring their uncle they built a monument for the most illustrious member of their family, Pope Nicholas IV whose name is mentioned twice in the funerary inscription.

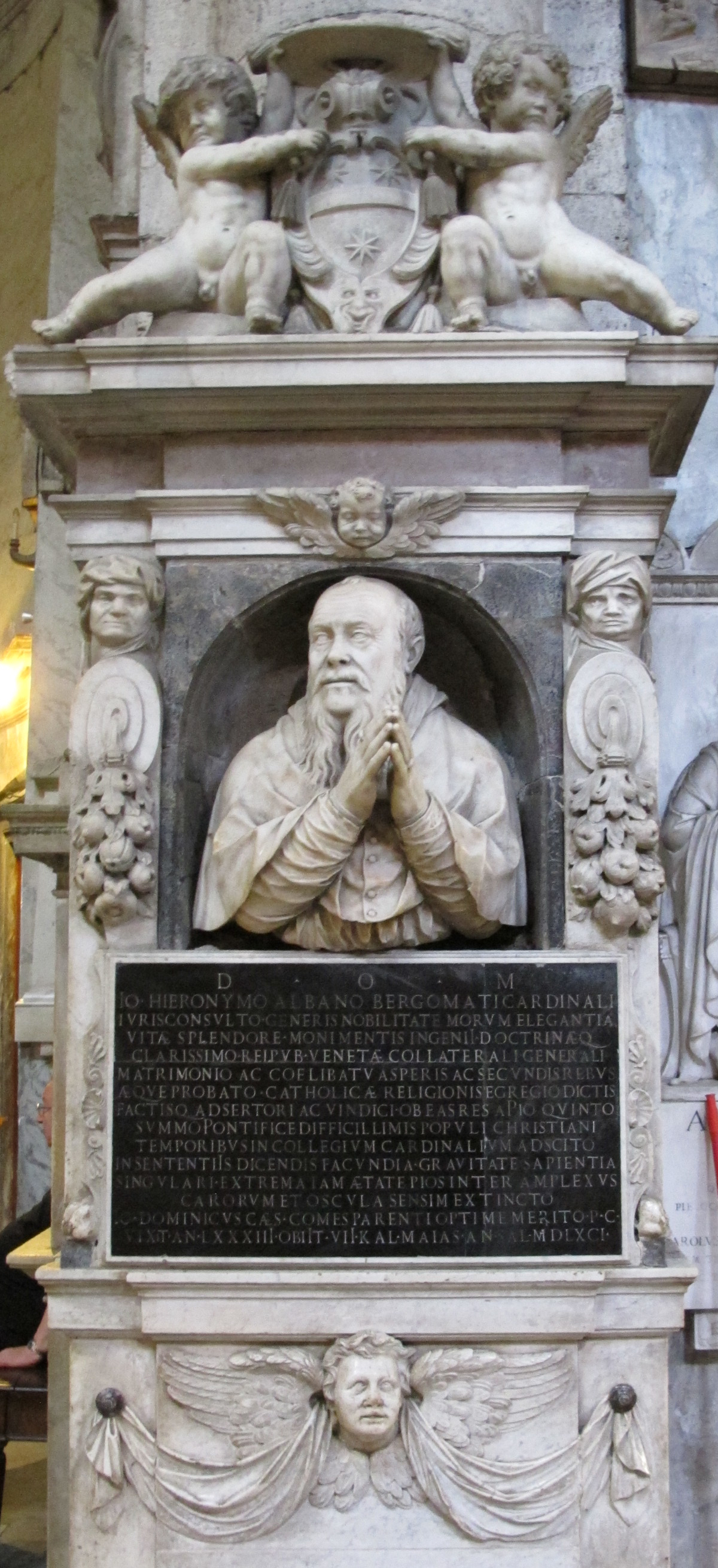
Tomb of Gian Girolamo Albani by Giovanni Antonio Paracca

There is another inscription on the base with the symbol of two crossbones under the guard of a winged angel. The rather macabre Latin verse speaks about a child who died while his mother was shedding too much tears at the tomb of her uncle.

The monument is a large tripartite aedicula composed of coloured marbles. The central part is decorated with the composite coat-of-arms of the Elefantucci-Masci families. It is flanked by extenuated volutes and crowned with a broken pediment and the Masci coat-of-arms (but this time without the papal tiara and the keys). The bust of the bishop is set in a round niche in the upper part. The motifs of the Masci arms (fleur-de-lis and the eight-pointed star) is used throughout as ornaments.

9. Gian Girolamo Albani

Cardinal Gian Girolamo Albani, protonotary apostolic was an influential politician, jurist, scholar and diplomat in the papal court during the last decades of the 16th century. He served as an advisor to four successive popes until his death in 1591 at the age of 81 years. His finely crafted tomb is set against the left pillar by the entrance of the Costa Chapel. The Late Renaissance monument is one of the main works of Giovanni Antonio Paracca (also known as Il Valsoldo). The bust of the Cardinal, praying in the niche, is a realistic portrait of the old statesman. The signs of aging and the cardinal's rugged features are accentuated by the strong strokes of the chisel. The flanking pillars are herms with veiled heads; their shafts are decorated with thick garlands of fruits. There is a small winged angel above the niche, and the base is decorated with another winged head and shrouds. The monument is crowned with the coat-of-arms of the cardinal held by two putti.

The bust has similarities with the funeral statue of Pope Sixtus V in the Basilica of Santa Maria Maggiore that was sculpted by Paracca in 1587–89. This prototype (the deceased shown in meditation or prayer) was carried on in the Baroque era, especially in the oeuvre of Gian Lorenzo Bernini.

The fine Neo-Classical stele on the same pillar is the memorial of Caterina Marini, a noblewoman who died in 1827 at the age of 33. The monument was set up by his grieving husband, Carlo Balestra, and it was made by sculptor Luigi Simonetti who signed the executed work in 1834. It follows the ancient Roman models with a finely carved relief depicting the togated husband laying a wreath of roses on the bust of his wife.

10. Giovanni Battista Pallavicino

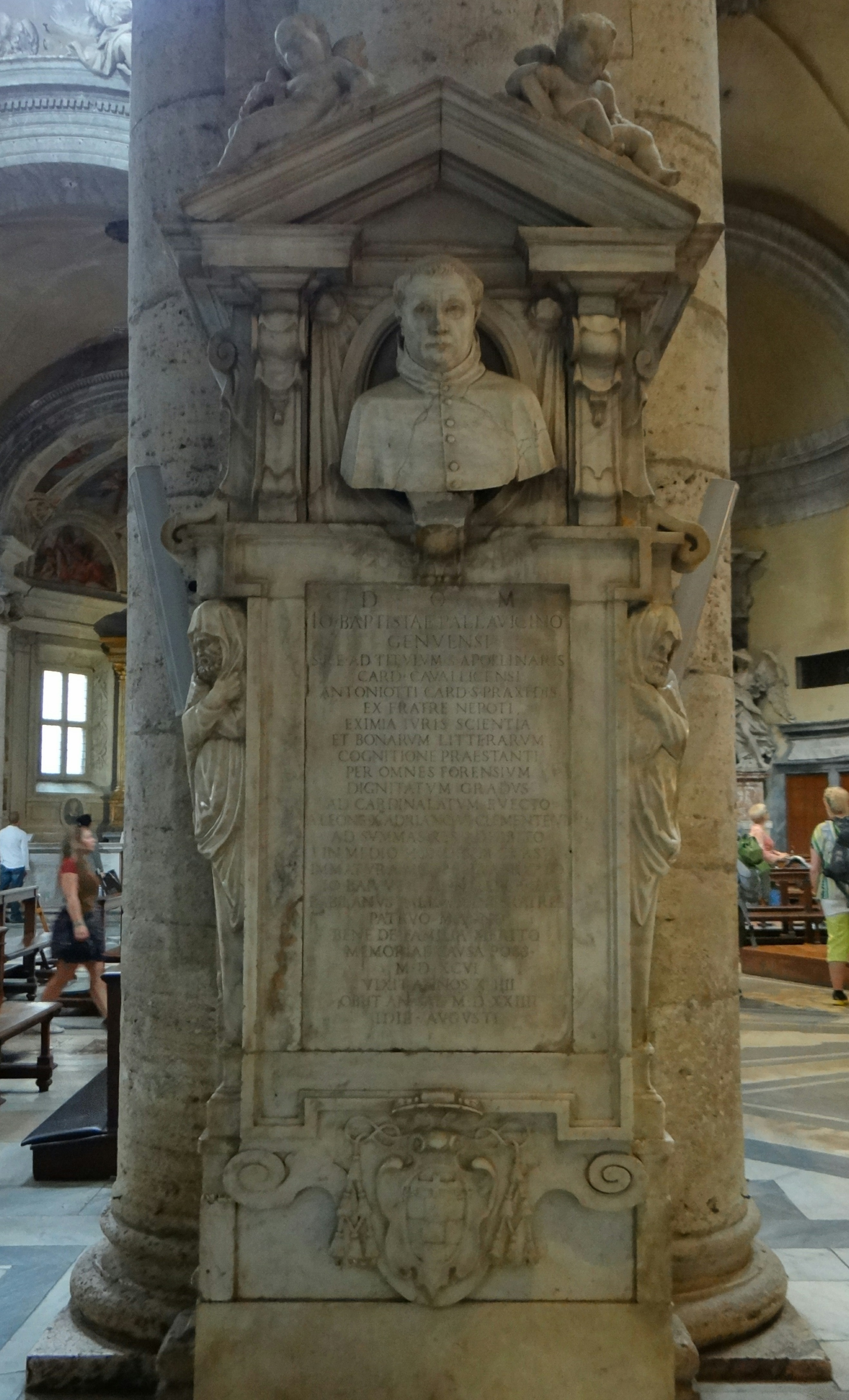
The funerary monument of Giovanni Battista Pallavicino

Set against the last pillar of the south aisle, the tomb of the Genovese cardinal, Giovanni Battista Pallavicino was erected well after his death in 1524. Pallavicino was a renowned jurist and the Bishop of Cavaillon who served as an apostolic secretary under the Medici pope, Leo X, and participated in the Fifth Council of the Lateran. He was created cardinal priest in 1517 that allowed him to further strengthen the position of his family. Later he lived in the court of Popes Adrian VI and Clement VII. Giovanni Battista Pallavicino died prematurely at the age of 44. The inscription claims that the cenotaph was built by his grateful nephews in 1596.

The long time gap is explained by the fact that the cardinal was buried in the Old St. Peter's Basilica together with his uncle and benefactor, Cardinal Antonio Pallavicini Gentili (Antoniotto). In 1596 their bodies were relocated to the cemetery Santa Maria del Popolo where Antoniotto's monument was set up and later transferred to the Montemirabile Chapel. Philipp Zitzlsperger calls this a particularly instructive example of the separation of the body and the tomb which increasingly came to be the norm in Rome from the second half of the 16th century because the location of the cardinal's corpse has not been established but the transferral of the remains was reason enough to the relatives to erect a cenotaph in the church itself.

The white marble cenotaph is the work of an unknown artist but attributed to Valsoldo (Giovanni Antonio Paracca). The bust of the cardinal is emerging sharply from the shallow oval niche that is flanked by voluted corbels. His head is uncovered, his ecclesiastical garment plain, and his features are stern and melancholic. The expressivity of the bust bears witness to the artistic power of the sculptor.

The cenotaph is a tripartite Late Renaissance funerary monument, crowned with a triangular gable. Two putti are resting on the top while the central body is flanked by half figures of veiled and bearded men crossing their arms over their chests. The lower part of the monument is decorated with the cardinal's coats-of-arms between two flat volutes.

== Right transept ==
1. Ludovico Podocataro

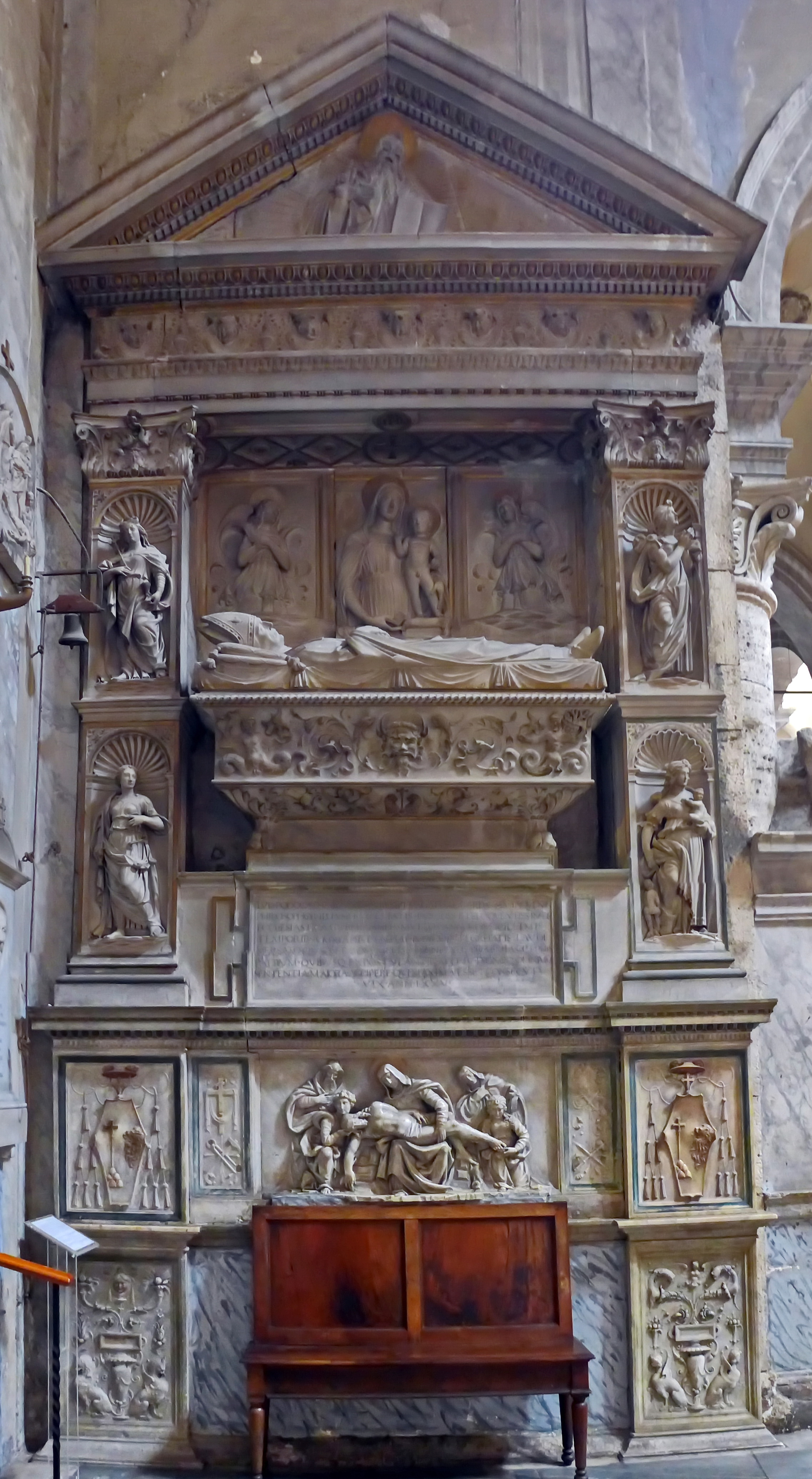
The funerary monument of Ludovico Podocataro

The wall tomb of Cardinal Ludovico Podocataro is a monumental work of Roman Renaissance sculpture. The Cypriot cardinal served as secretary and physician Pope Alexander VI. The prominent humanist and papal diplomat died on 25 August 1504 at the age of 75 in Rome. He was buried in the favourite church of the Borgias on 7 October with great pomp; the funeral oration was given by his secretary, Fedra Inghirami.

The location of the tomb in the right transept was originally close to the funerary chapel of the Borgia family, Podocataro's patrons, but this has been demolished long ago.

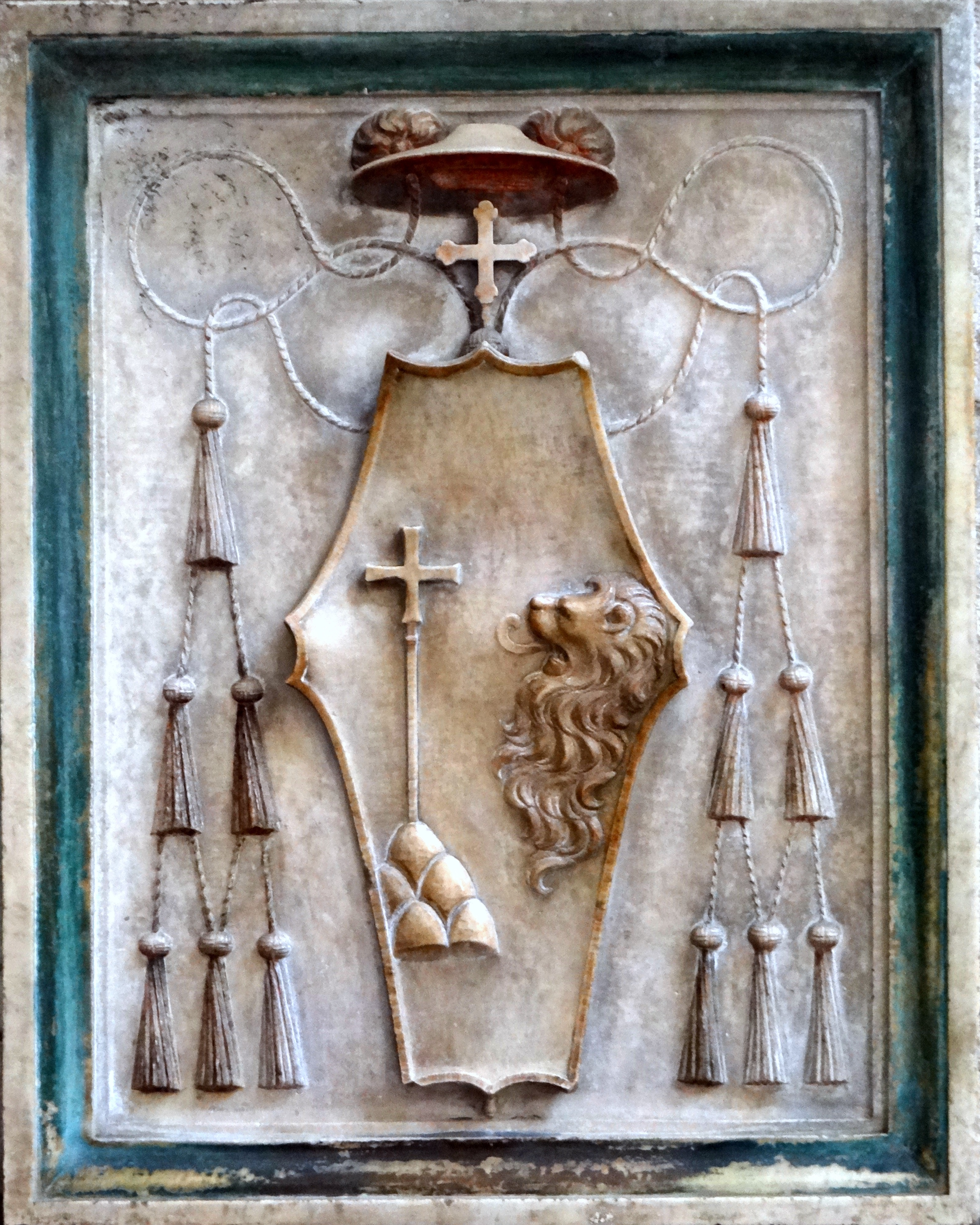
Podocataro's arms

The monument is a Renaissance wall tomb in the form of an aedicula. Irregular Corinthian pillars hold the architrave (decorated with little cherubs) and the triangular pediment with the figure of God, the father. The sarcophagus with the recumbent figure of the cardinal (gisant) is placed in the central niche. The sarcophagus rests on lion's paws and it is decorated with floral ornaments, grotesques and a satyr mask on the front. The deceased cardinal wears ecclesiastical robes with a mitre on his head. The lateral pillars are decorated with four allegorical statues in shell-headed niches: Caritas, Fides, Iustitia and Religio. The reliefs on the back wall of the central niche depict a slender Madonna flanked by two praying angels. The unusually high plinth is adorned with a Pietà scene in high relief flanked by two panels showing the symbols of Christ's Passion. The bases of the pillars are decorated with the cardinal's coats-of-arms and two panels with sphinxes, vases, masks and cornucopias.

Originally the monument had a dual function as an altar and tomb. The Pietà scene decorated the front of the altar table which is now missing. (A 17th-century drawing in the Royal Collection already shows the monument in its present form.) Remnants of paint and gilding are preserved on parts of the monument, especially on the halo of God and the coats-of-arms.

The monument was probably commissioned by the cardinal between 1497, when he made a donation to the Augustinian church, and 1504, his death. It was perhaps finished after his death by his nephew and heir. The master(s) of the monument are unknown but stylistically it is the work of different groups of sculptors. The architectural composition is traditional and somewhat conservative for the beginning of the 16th century; it follows the models of Andrea Bregno, a highly successful Lombard artist, who died in 1503. The elements which probably belong to Bregno's circle are the relief of God, the Madonna, the gisant and the Virtues, although their quality is different. Another group was responsible for the coats-of-arms and the panels with the symbols of the Passion and also the antique motifs. The Pietà scene belongs to a third stylistic register and it is the work of an inexperienced sculptor under Michelangelesque influences. The tomb is sometimes attributed to Giovanni Cristoforo Romano based on an apocryphal source but this is highly dubious.

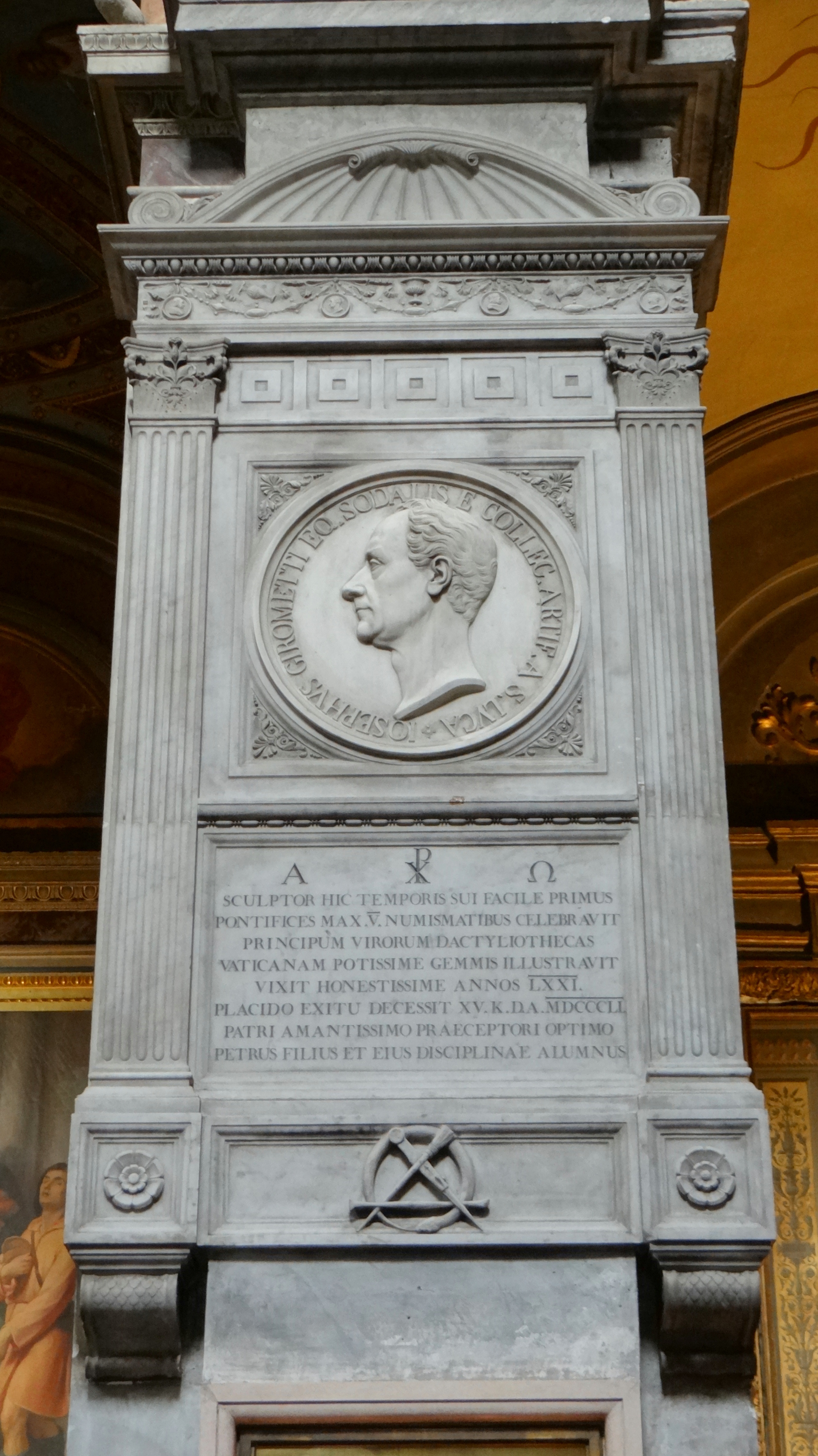
Monument of the engraver Giuseppe Girometti.

2. Giuseppe Seffer

A simple marble stele near the Podocataro monument serves as a memorial for Giuseppe Seffer, a chemist and refugee of Turkish persecutions, according to the inscription. He died in 1860 at the age of 54 years. The simple Neo-Classical memorial is decorated with the portrait of the deceased surrounded by an ouroboros (a snake biting its own tail), and crowned with a round pediment.

3. Carlo Balestra

The Neo-Classical monument for Carlo Balestra by the altar of the right transept was erected by himself during his lifetime. He also commissioned another monument in the basilica for his deceased wife, Caterina Marini in 1834. According to the inscription Balestra died in 1874 aged 94. The monument is a Greek stele decorated with the fine relief of an angel, holding a trumpet in his hand, and leaning on a funerary urn on the top of a pillar. Above the stele the bust of the deceased is set in a scallop niche.

4. Giuseppe Girometti

The funeral monument of Giuseppe Girometti, an internationally renowned medalist, engraver and cameo carver living in Neo-Classical Rome, is set high upon the pillar between the Feoli and Cicada Chapels. Girometti's workshop in nearby Via Del Corso 518 was a favored meeting place for members of the papal aristocracy, officials and foreign artists in the first half of the 19th century. Girometti died in 1851 at the age of 71. The monument was erected by his son, the engraver Pietro, and his disciples. It was built in the form of a Renaissance aedicule crowned with a scalloped pediment. The relief portrait of the deceased is set in a medal, referring to his profession, and the base is decorated with the tools of his art, the compasses and the brush, encircled by a small ouroboros.

5. Virgilio Malvezzi

Marquess Virgilio Malvezzi served as representative of his hometown, Bologna in Rome for 7 years between 1683 and 1691 until his death at the age of 52. His funeral monument is on the pillar to the left of the Chapel of Saint Thomas of Villanova. The composition is similar to the smaller Baroque monument of Samuel Rafael Globic: two putti holding a rippling drapery with the long funerary inscription and the family coat-of-arms. The symbol of death and the journey of the soul, a winged skull was added to the Malvezzi monument. The inscription mentions a more famous member of the family, another Virgilio Malvezzi, the great-uncle of the deceased.

== Left transept ==
1. Bernardino Lonati

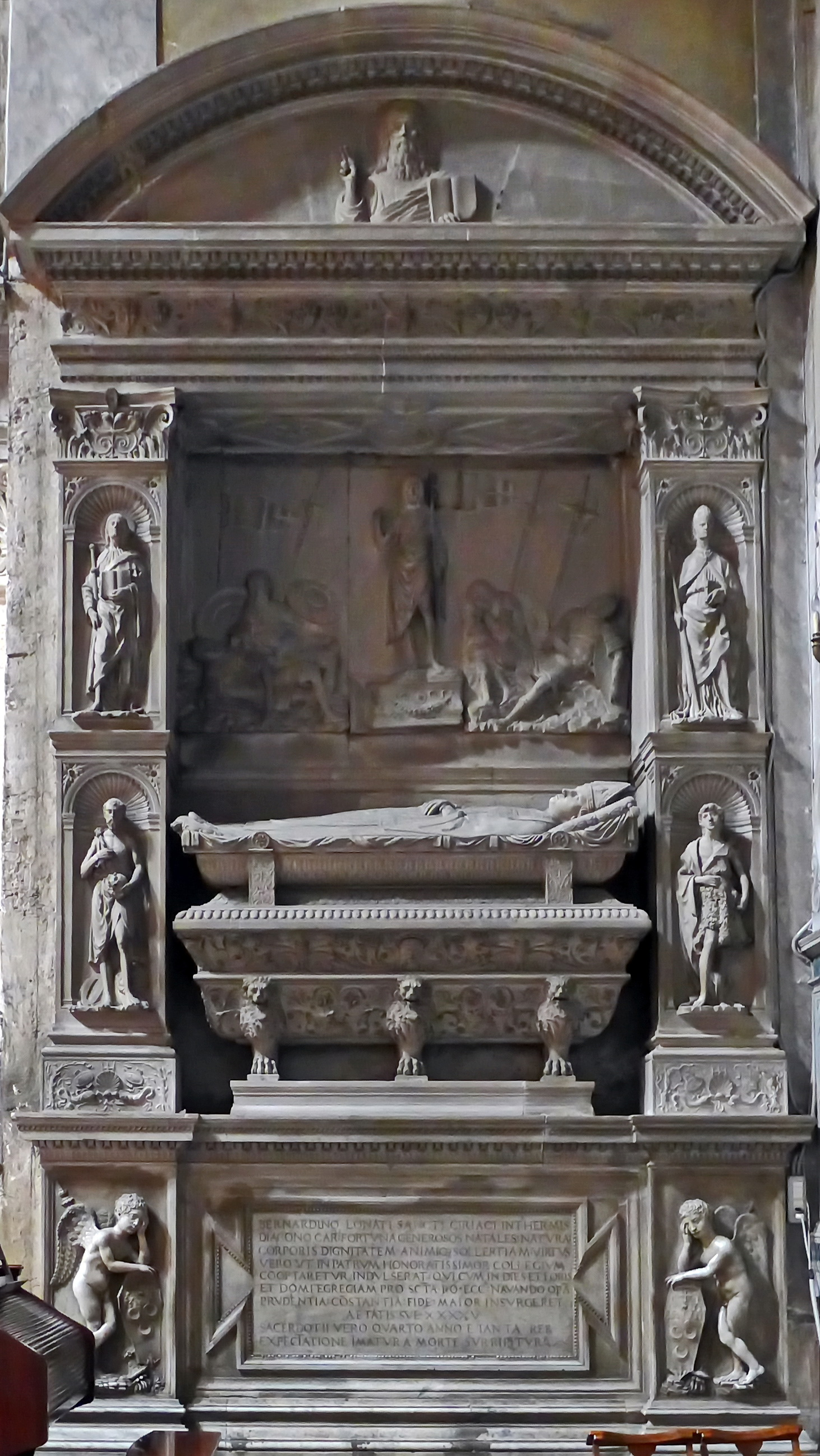
The tomb of Cardinal Bernardino Lonati (†1497).

The wall tomb of Cardinal Bernardino Lonati is a monumental Renaissance sepulchre. Like its counterpart in the right transept, the tomb of Lodovico Podocataro, it belongs to the group of monuments from the age of Pope Alexander VI which made the basilica the shrine of the Borgia dynasty at the beginning of the 16th century.

Bernardino Lonati was not a very important personality in the Borgia court in his own right. He was called the "poor cardinal" because he lacked personal wealth but he had a really influential patron, Cardinal Ascanio Sforza, Vice-Chancellor of the Holy Roman Church, whom he served loyally all through his life, sometimes even in confrontation against the Pope. In 1497 Lonati was leader of the papal army against the Orsinis in the unsuccessful expedition against Bracciano. He was hit by a bout of fever and died in Rome two months later on 7 August at the age of 45.

The funeral and the monument was paid by Ascanio Sforza. Lonati was buried solemnly in the basilica with the participation of the Roman Brotherhood of St. Ambrose of the Lombards. The sizable marble monument conveyed a sense of importance because Sforza wanted to enhance the reputation of his protégée in the eyes of those who used to see him as a mere puppet. Perhaps this explains the absence of any allusion to the patron in the epigraph. The inscription claims that "premature death prevented him doing the great deeds that were expected". The epitaph stresses that he owed his place in the College of Cardinals to his virtue.

The monument follows the models of Andrea Bregno, and its composition is very similar to the coeval tomb of Lodovico Podocataro with small differences. The sepulchre was built in the form of an aedicula with irregular Corinthian pilasters holding the architrave and the semicircular pediment with the figure of God, the father. The sarcophagus with the recumbent figure of the cardinal (gisant) is placed in the central rectangular niche. The sarcophagus rests on three lion's paws and it is decorated with floral ornaments, the deceased cardinal wears ecclesiastical robes with a mitre on his head, and he is lying on the top of a bier. The lateral pillars are decorated with four statues in shell-headed niches: Saint John the Evangelist, Saint Jerome, a saint bishop and Saint John the Baptist. The relief on the back wall of the central niche depict the resurrection of Christ among sleeping soldiers at the tomb. The epitaph is flanked by two angels leaning against shields with the coat-of-arms of the cardinal, three half-moons. The motif appears again on the base of the lateral pillars where a fine relief shows a scallop, a trident, two dolphins, two sprouting trees and trophies.

On the adjoining pillar there is a Neo-Classical female tomb with the bust of the deceased from 1862.

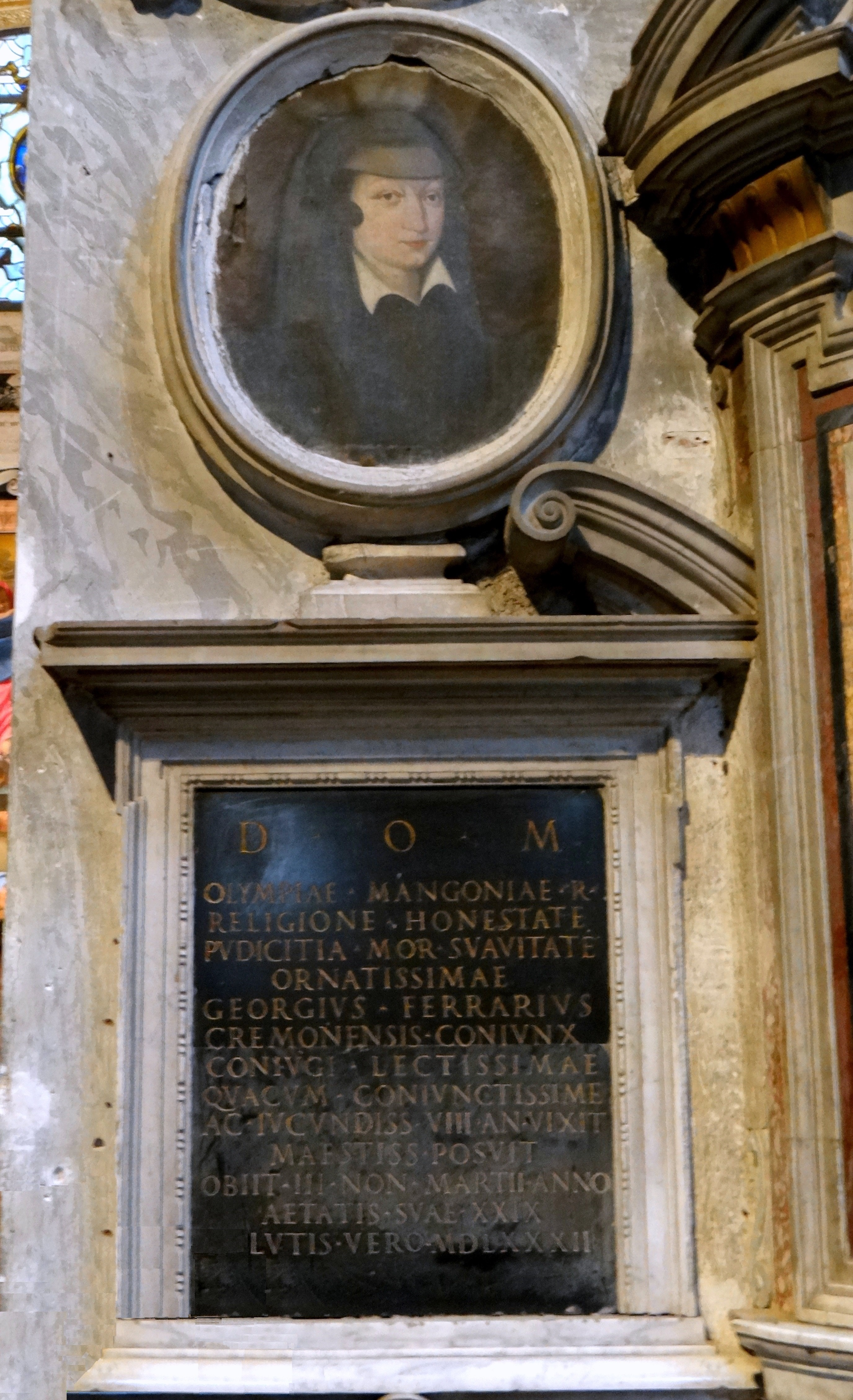
Monument of Olimpia Mangoni

2. Artur Mostowski

The Neo-Classical stele on the right side of the apse of the transept was erected to the memory of Count Artur Mostowski who died in 1852 at the age of 30. The simple marble monument is crowned with a triangular pediment, decorated with the coat-of-arms of the deceased. The relief portrait of Mostowski is surrounded by an ouroboros, a symbol of infinity. The sculptor of the stele was Scipione Tadolini, a follower of Canova. The inscription declares that Mostowski was a Polish patriot but an earlier version in French told that he served in the Russian army as a captain.

3. Paolo M. Martinez

High upon the pillar between the Theodoli and Cerasi Chapels the funerary monument of Paolo M. Martinez was erected by the custodians of his inheritance after his death in 1833. The inscription tells that this Spanish nobleman of great probity, frugality and piety bequeathed 12'000 scudi to the Hospital of San Giacomo degli Incurabili. The style of monument is archaic for the 19th century. Its main feature is the Roman bust of the deceased in a plain niche, flanked by two boys wearing a tunic and holding inverted torches. The monument is crowned with a coat-of-arms, garlands and two flaming urns.

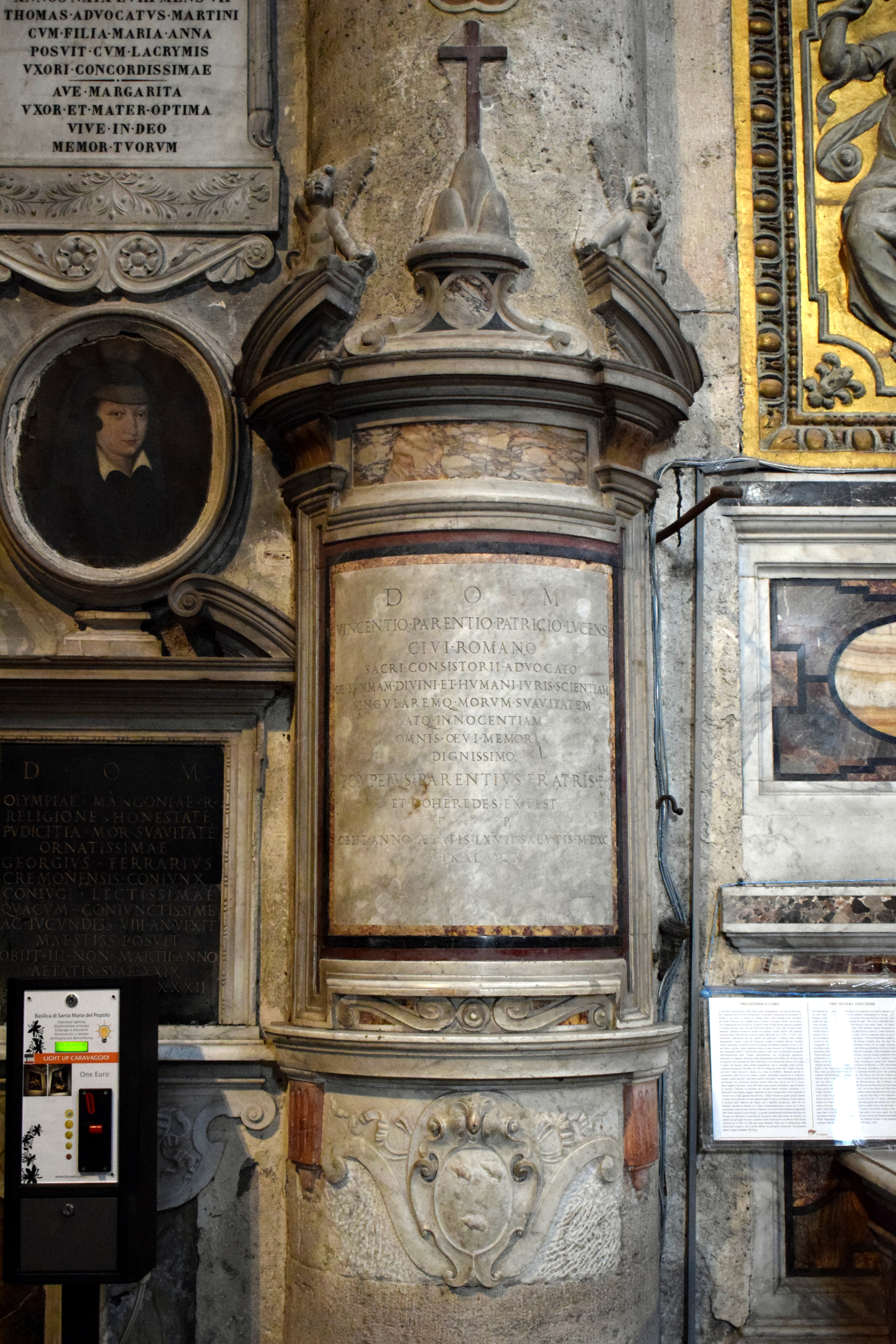
Monument of Vincenzo Parenzi

There is another funerary monument on the other side of the Cerasi Chapel, high on the pillar, dedicated to Margarita Arcangeli by her husband, Tommaso Martini and her daughter, Maria Anna. She died in 1861 at the age of 58. The simple stele is crowned with a scallop niche and framed by two inverted torches, there are branches of oil trees on the base carved in fine relief.

4. Olimpia Mangoni

The funeral monument of Olimpia Mangoni is located on the pillar next to the entrance of the Cerasi Chapel. It was erected by his widower, Giorgio Ferrari for the wife whom he lived with "in the most conjugal and most joyous marriage" for 8 years. Olimpia died in 1582 at the age of 29. In the same year Ferrari, a publisher from Cremona, set up another funerary monument in the basilica for himself but this disappeared without trace. The monument itself is a simple Renaissance wall tomb consisting of an epitaph, the carved coat-of-arms and the painted portrait of the deceased in an oval frame. The left side of the arched broken pediment is missing.

5. Vincenzo Parenzi

The most interesting feature of the funeral monument of Vincenzo Parenzi, a consistorial advocate of the Roman Curia and a patrician of Lucca, is that its curved form follows the shape of the half-column it is attached to. Parenzi died on 26 September 1590 at the age of 67; the monument was erected by his nephew and co-heir, Pompeo Parenzi. (Vincenzo Parenzi himself had created a monument for his wife in the north aisle of the basilica.) The late Renaissance monument is made of white marble and coloured stones, and decorated with the Parenzi coat-of-arms (three hedgehogs), two small putti and a cross resting on three mountains.

== Nave ==
There are several tombstones set into the floor of the basilica. Many of them are older than the present-day 17th century pavement, and due to the wear and tear of the centuries their surface lost its original features and their inscriptions became indecipherable. Only the most conspicuous are mentioned here.

- Florido Libelli from Città di Castello, 1607. He was buried by his sons under a slab with a pietre dure frame of geometric motifs, coat-of-arms and bronze letters.
- Paolo Montorio from Narni, 1581, relative of the influential Cesi family. The slab is decorated with coloured stones, bronze letters, a bronze coat-of-arms, two skulls and crossbones and the Montorio family symbols (the six mountain and fleur-de-lis).
- Innico Piccolomini, the 4th Duke of Amalfi, Marquess of Capestrano, 1566, member of an important aristocratic family in the Kingdom of Naples. Simple tomb with bronze letters and the skull and crossbones motif in bronze.
- Filippo de Luna, 1449. Well preserved Gothic tomb slab, the deceased wearing typical late medieval civilian men's clothing.

== Gallery ==
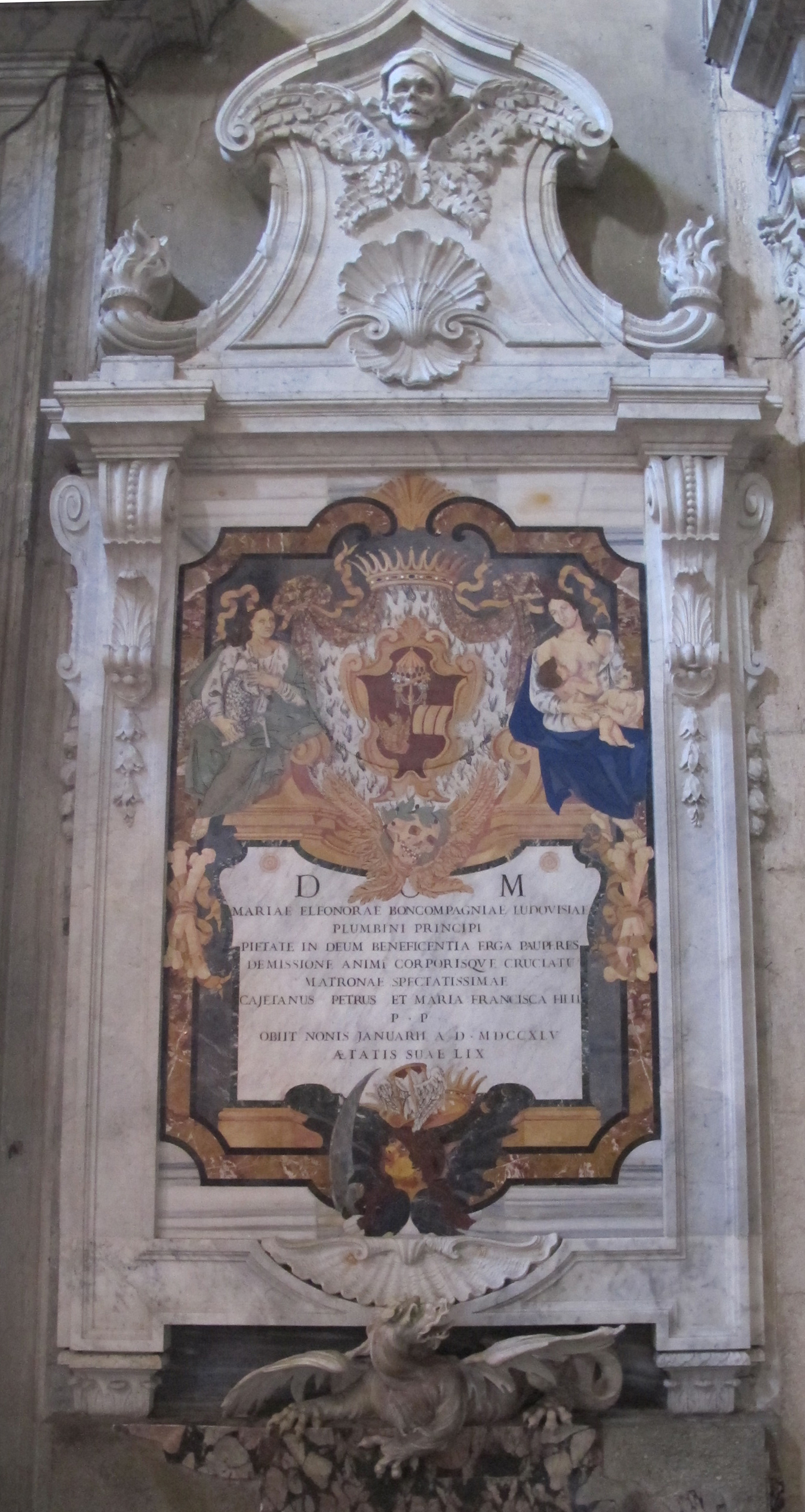
Monument of Maria Eleonora Boncompagni Ludovisi

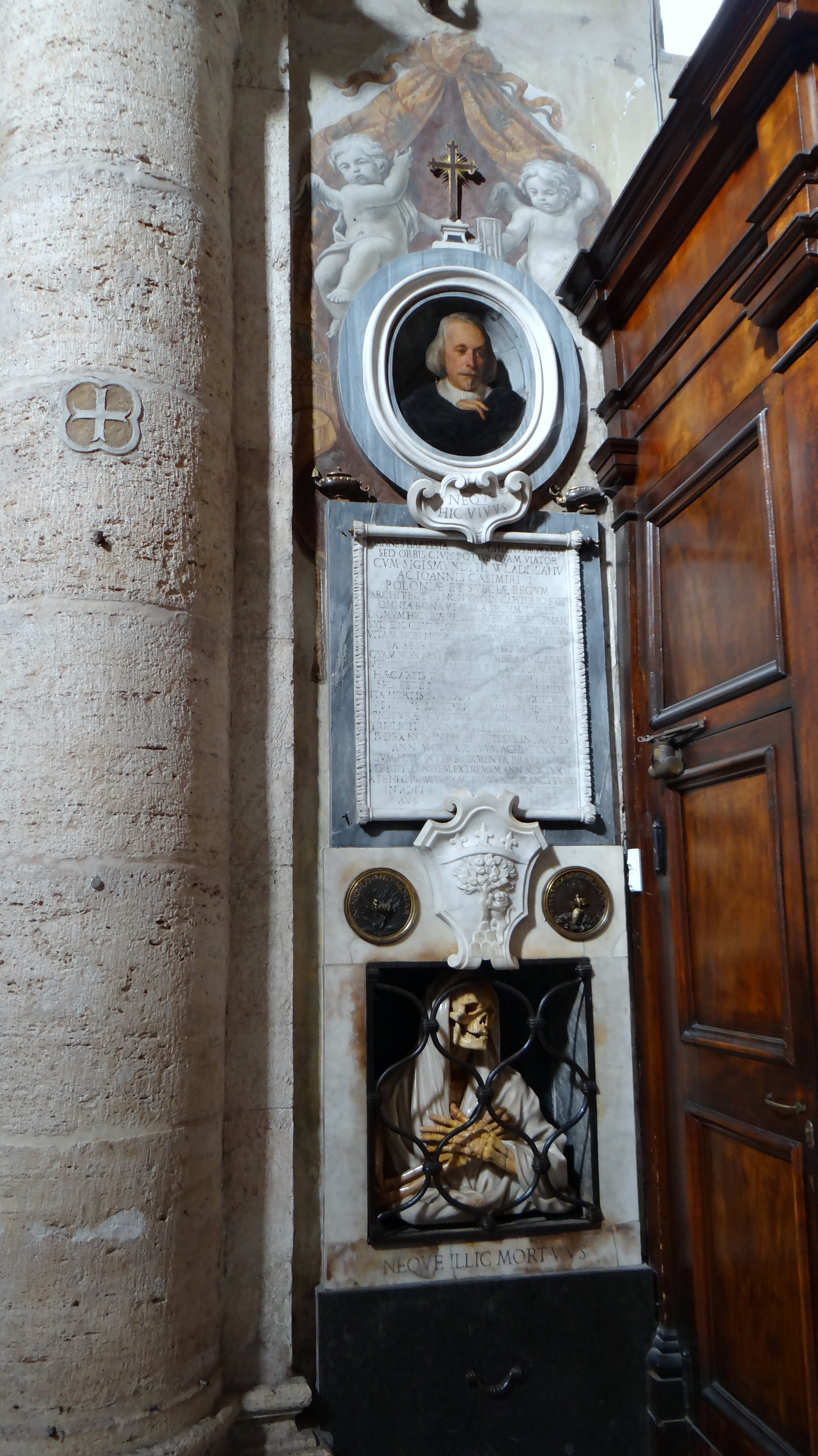
Monument of Giovanni Battista Gisleni

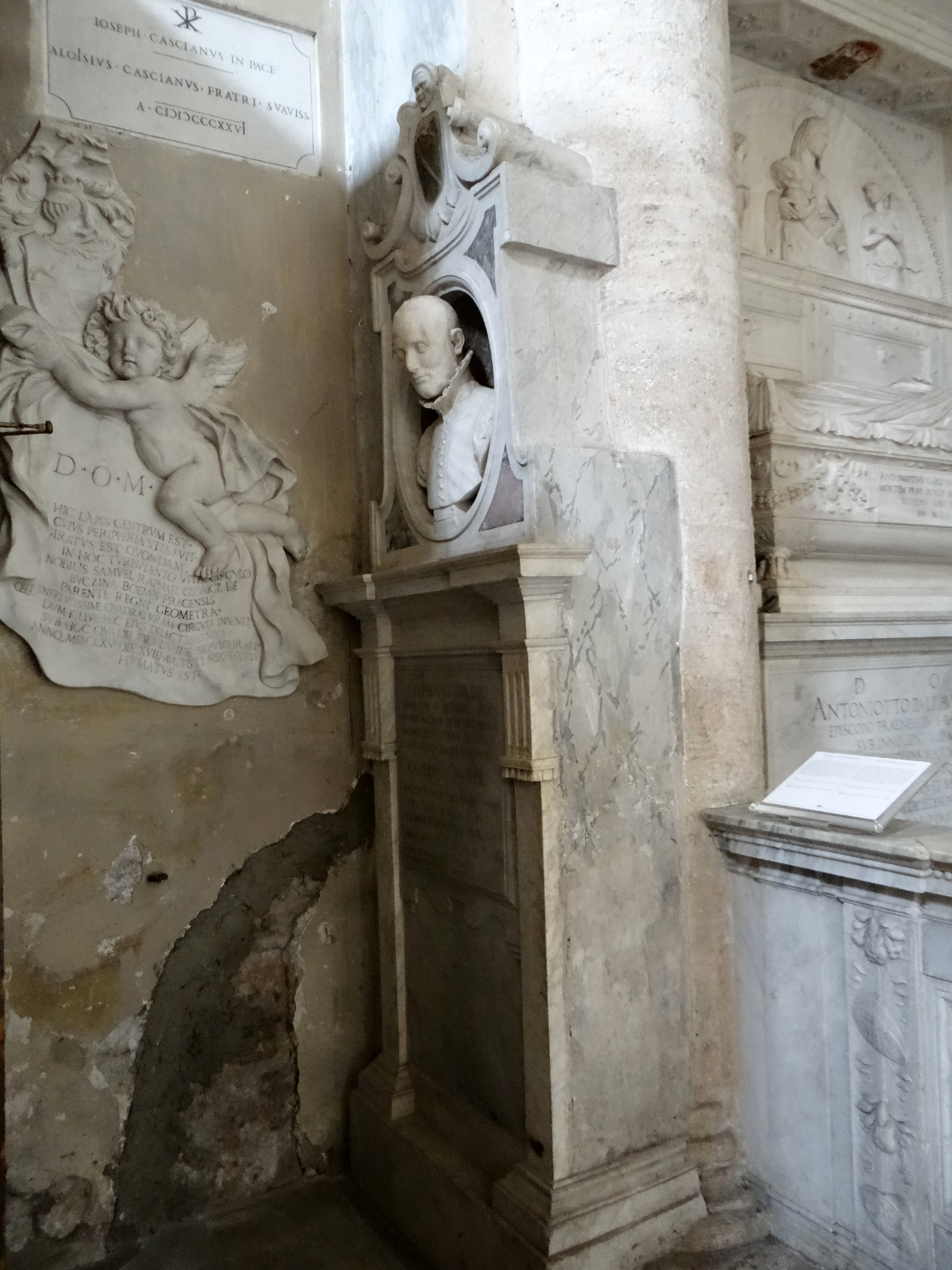
Monument of Stefano Spada

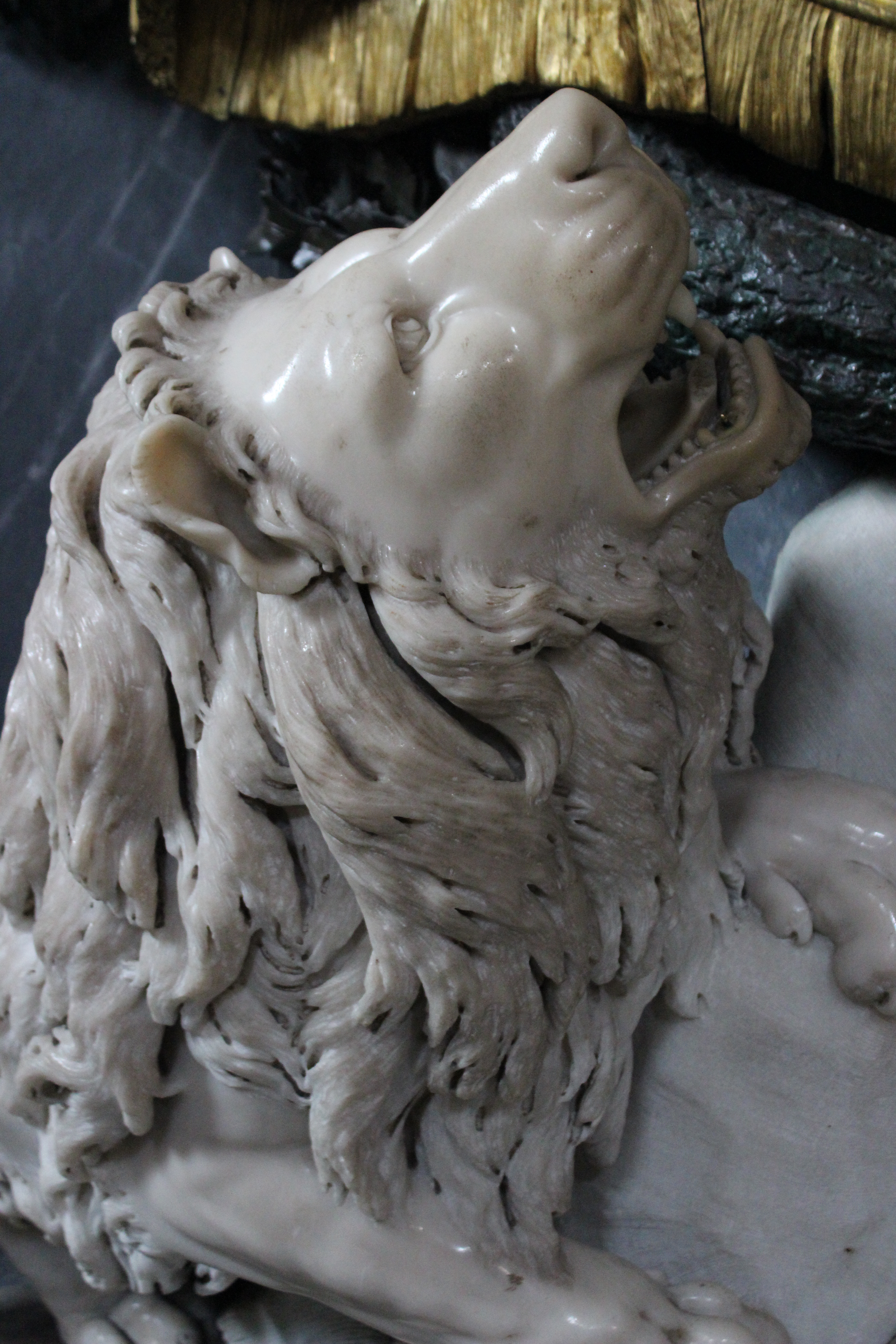
Lion on the monument of Maria Flaminia Odescalchi Chigi

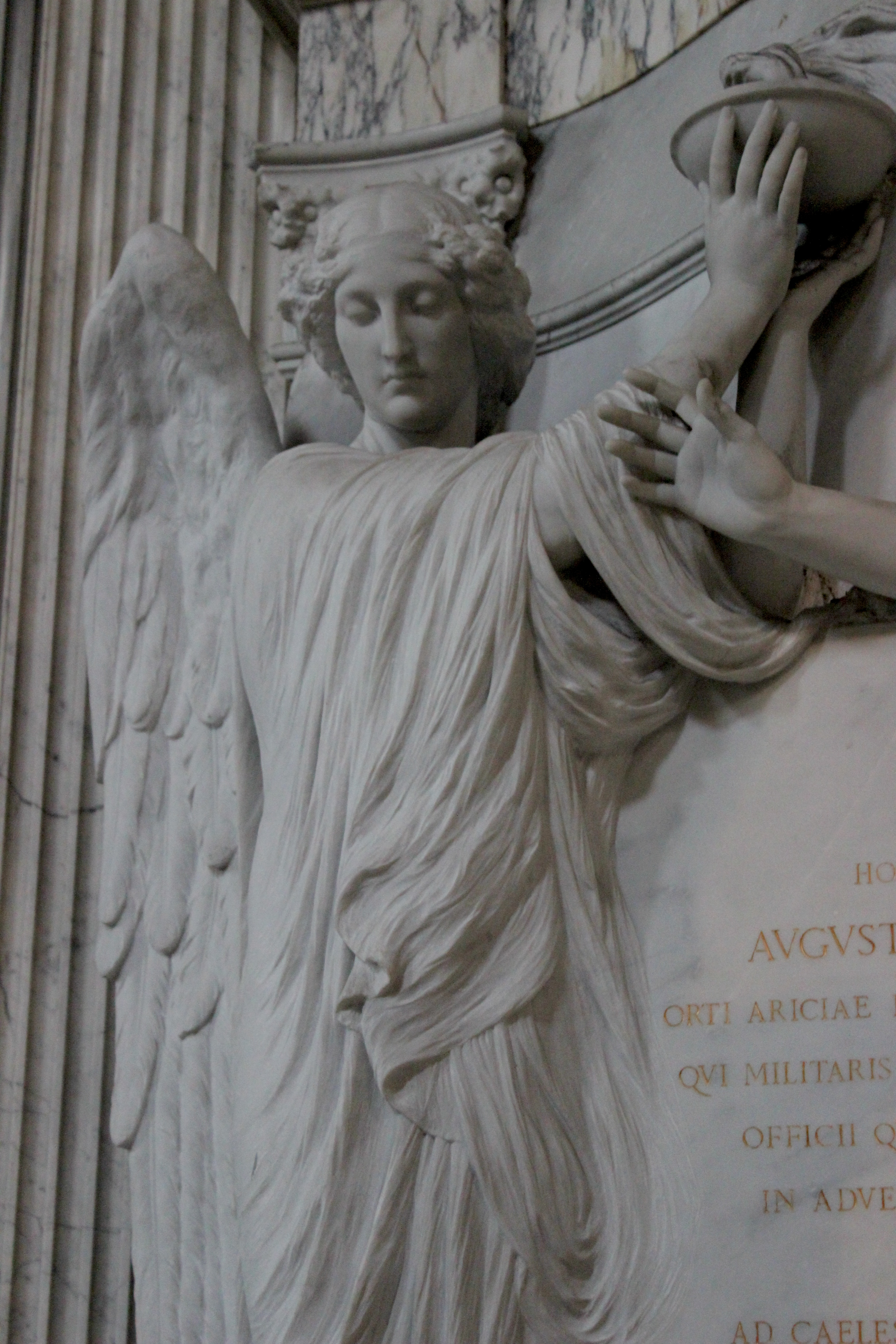
Monument of Prince Agostino Chigi, detail

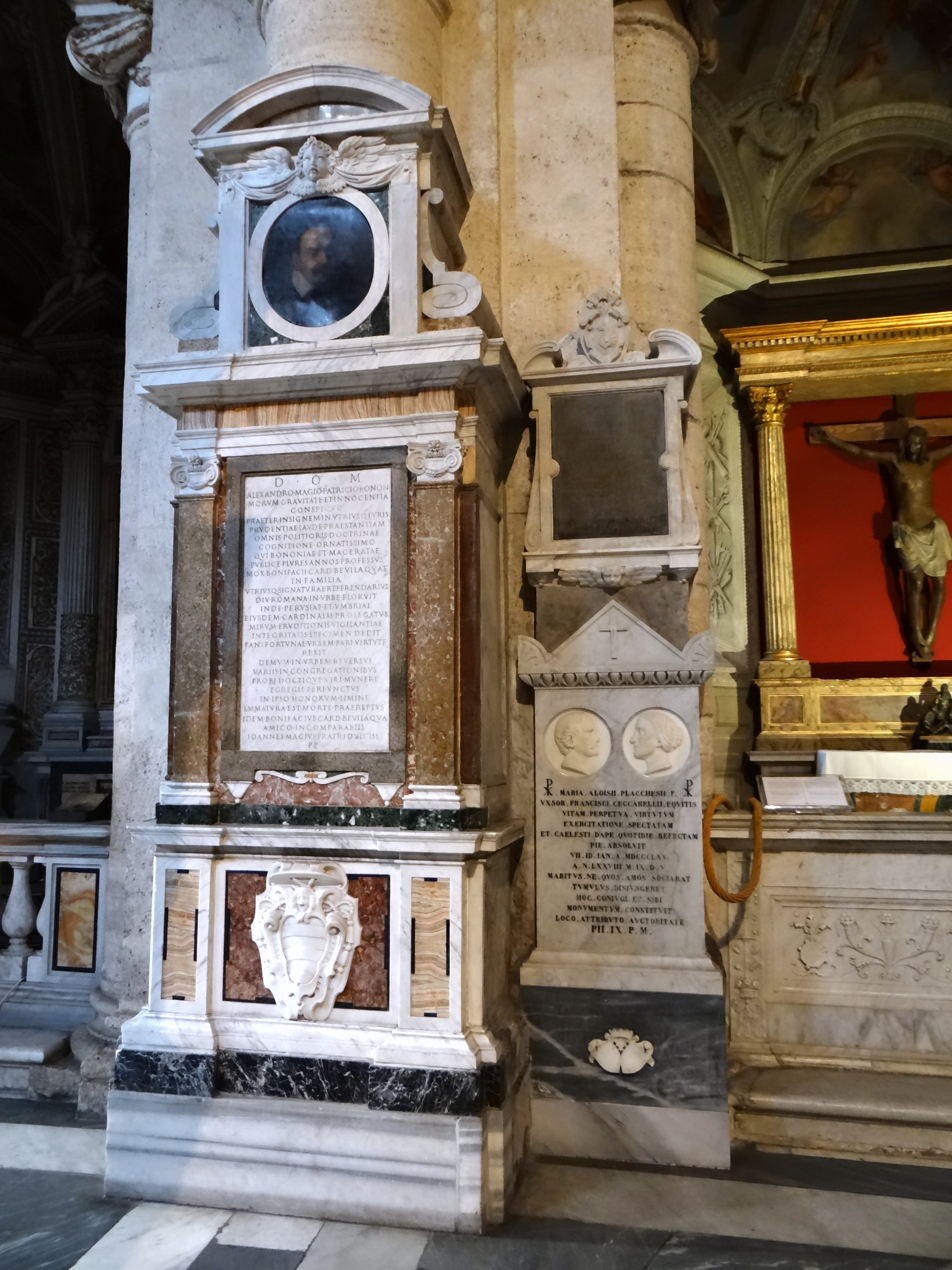
The tomb of Alessandro Maggi

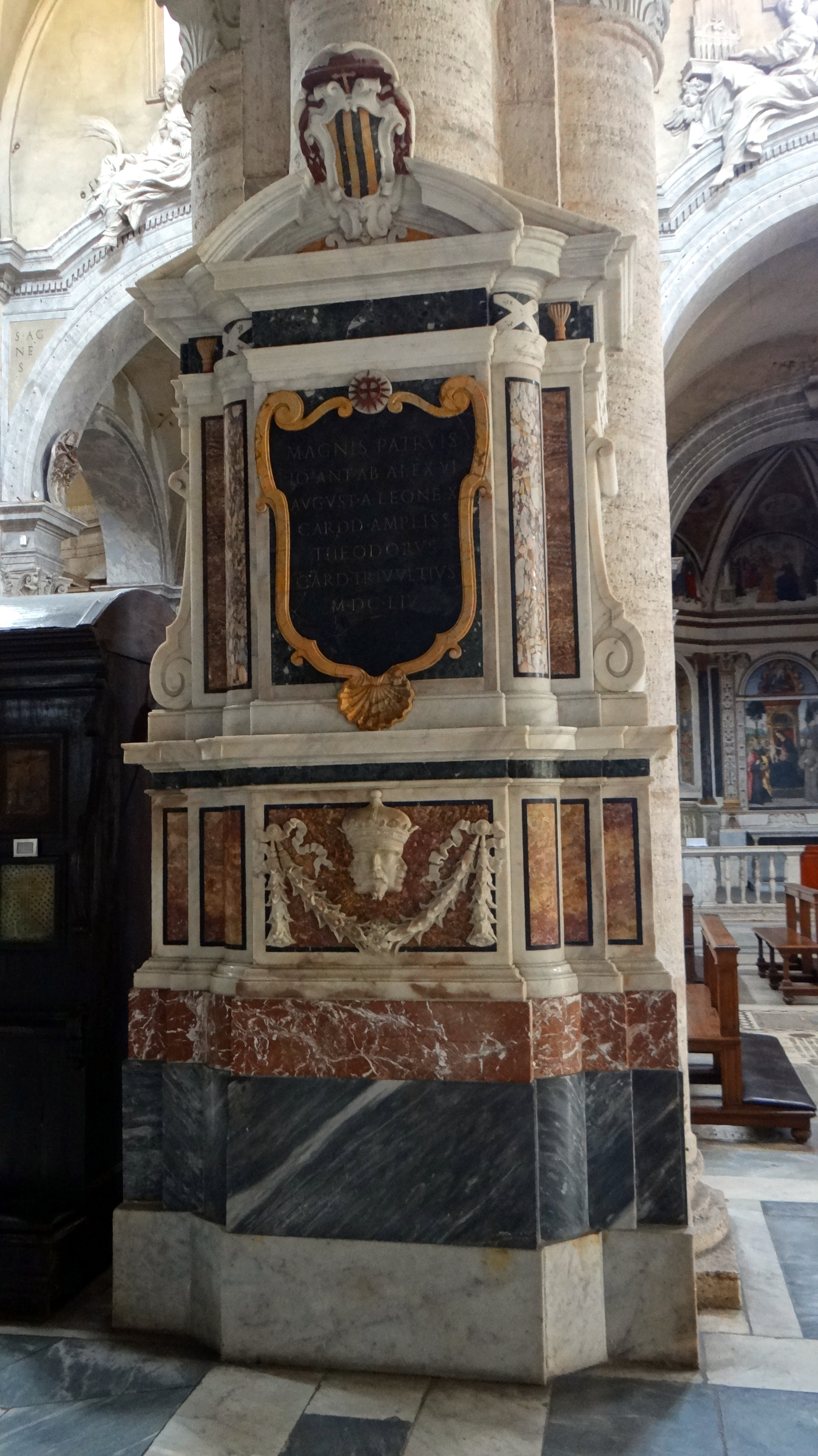
The tomb of the Trivulzio Cardinals

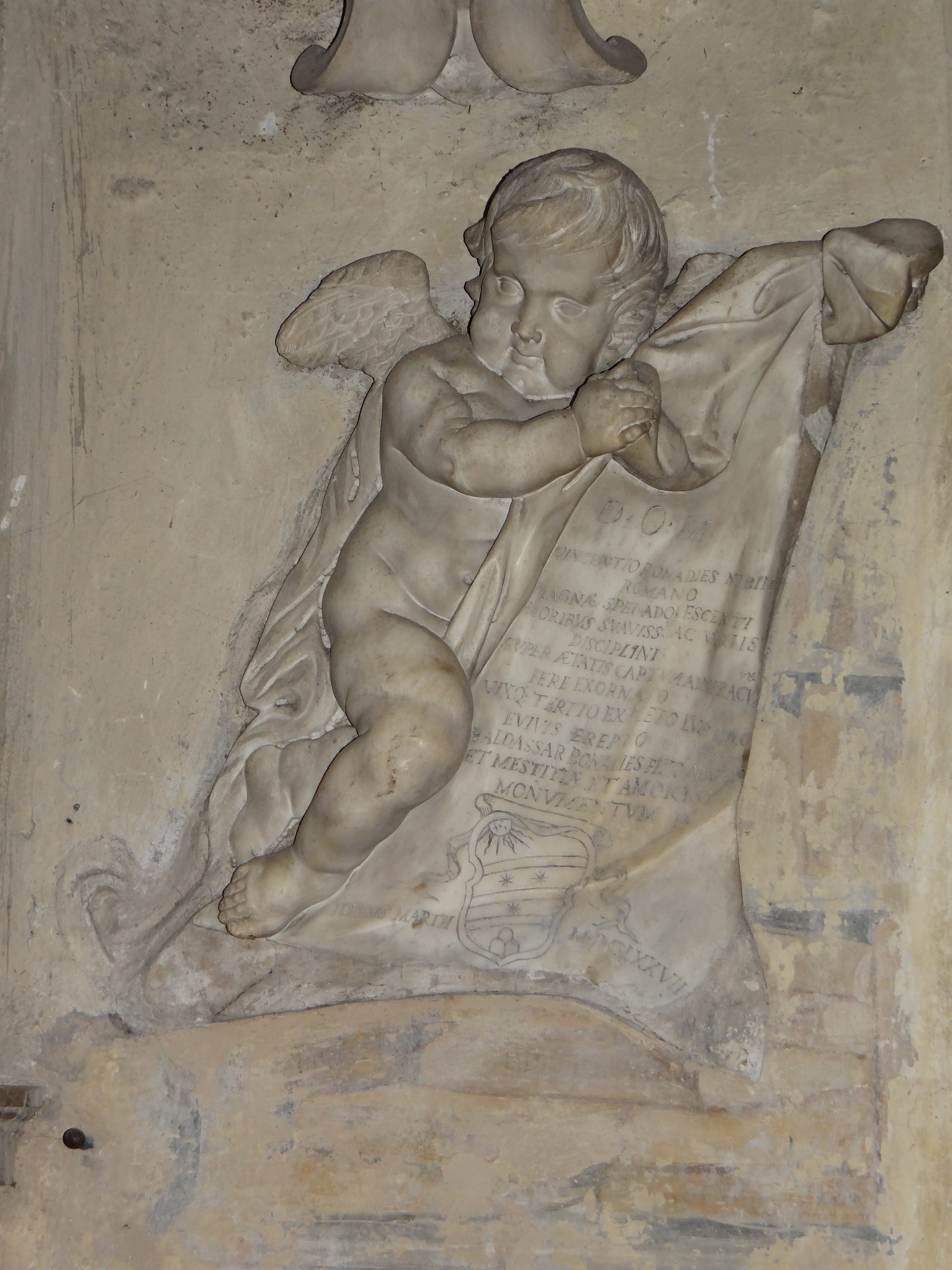
The monument of Vincenzo Bonadies

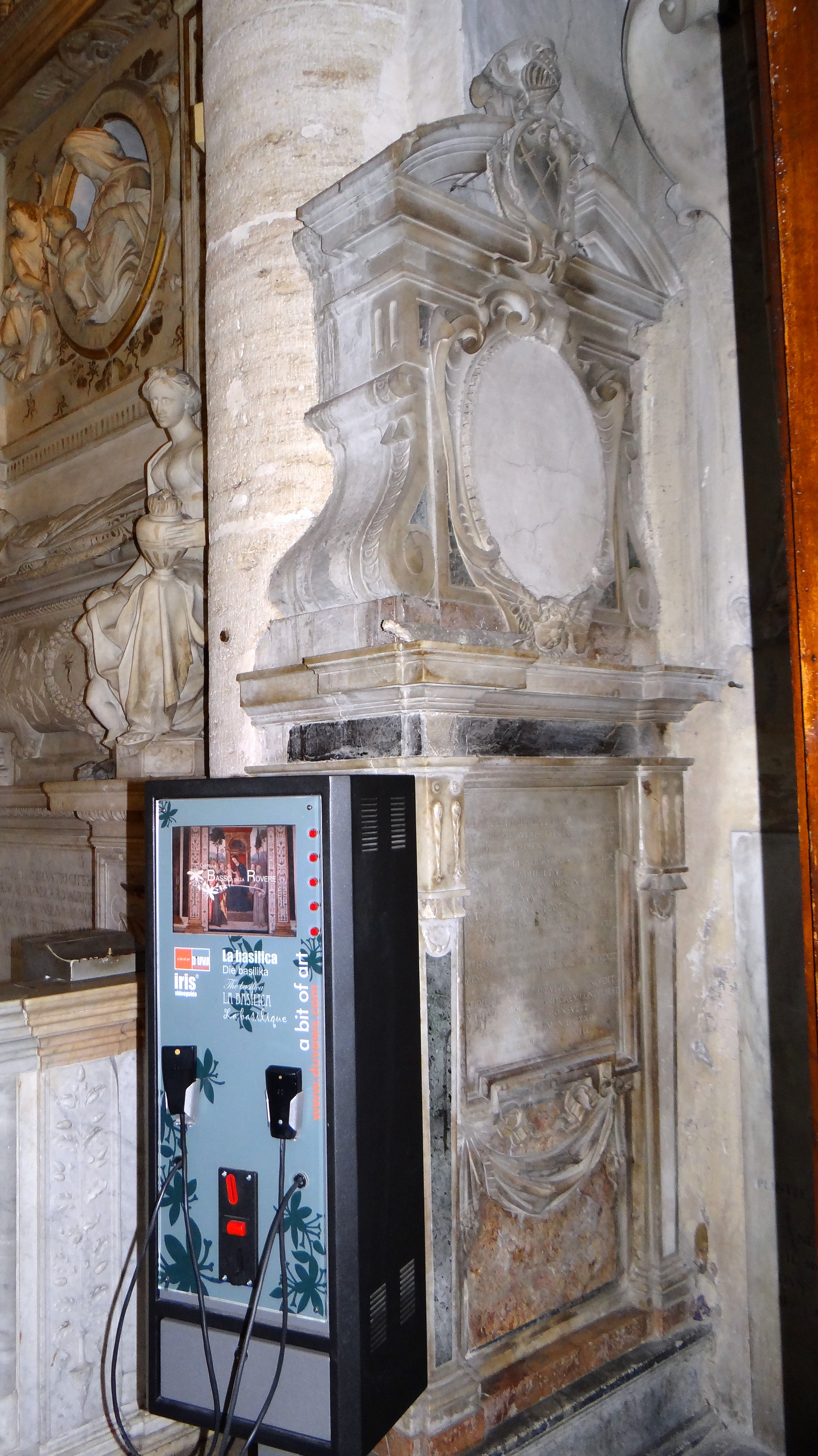
The tomb of Giovanni Battista Spada

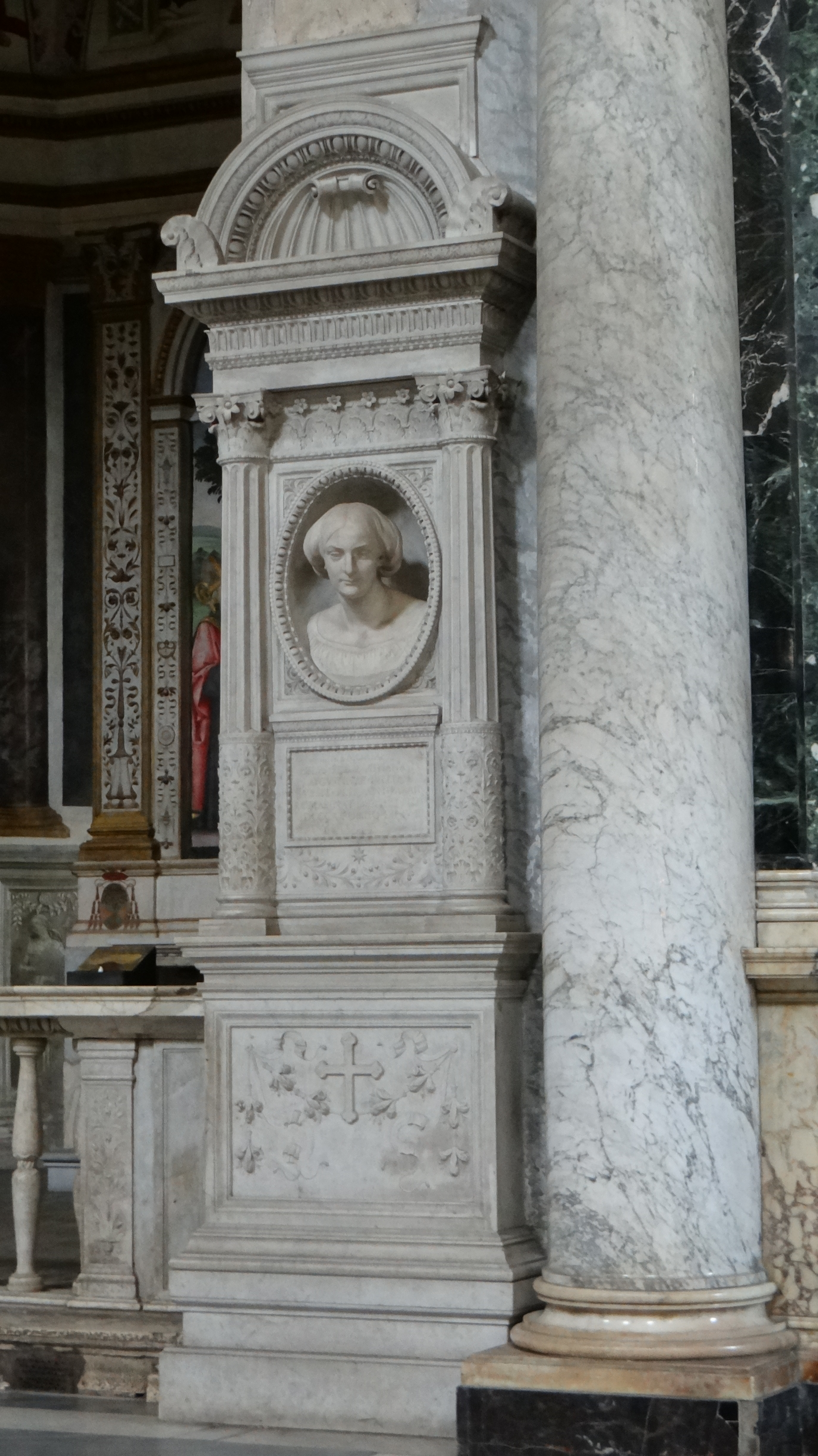
The tomb of Adele Julien

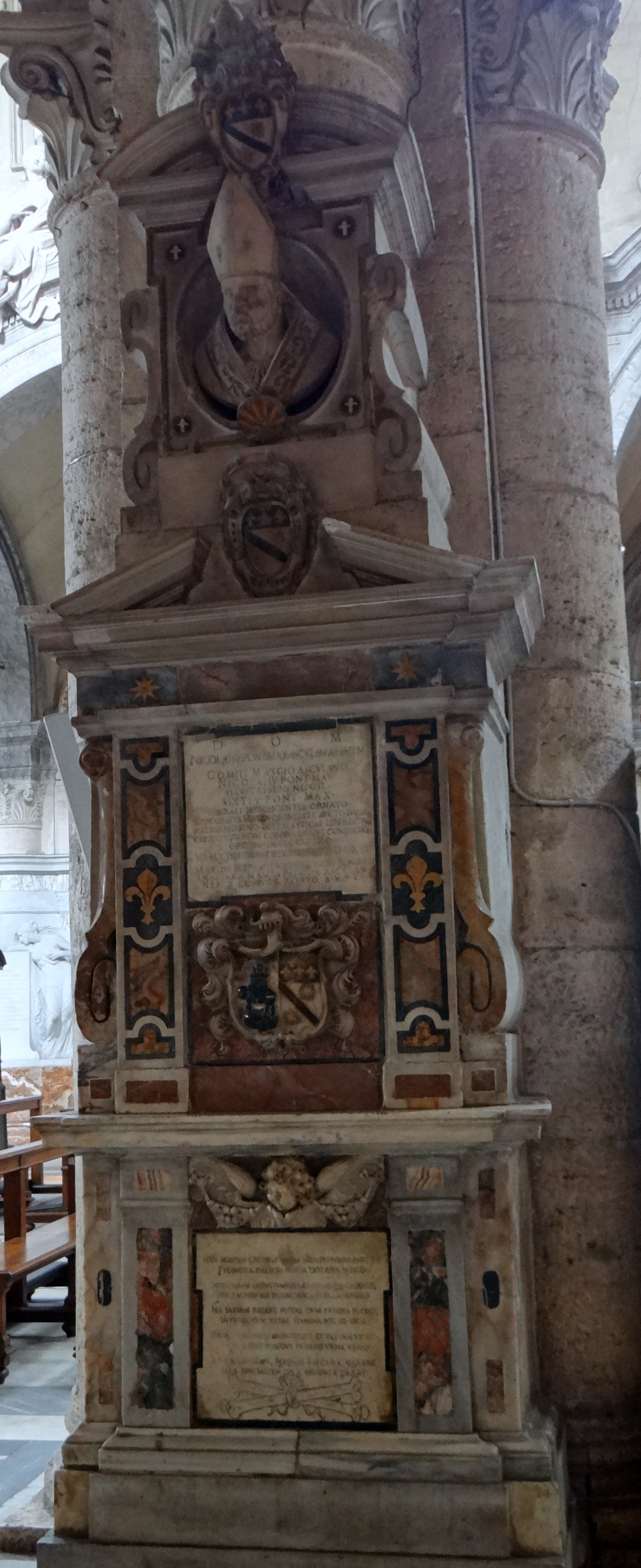
The tomb of Bishop Masci

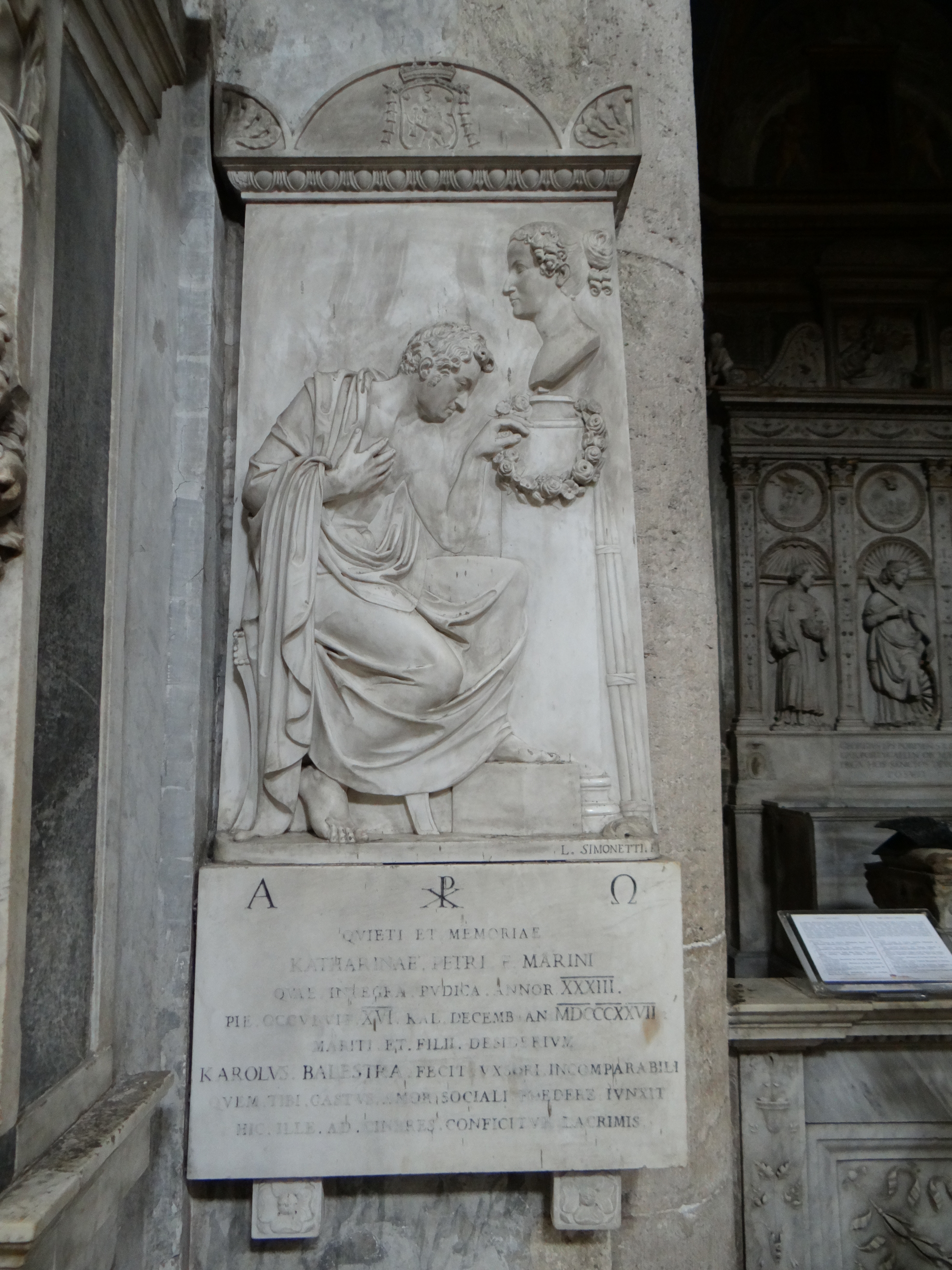
The stele of Caterina Marini

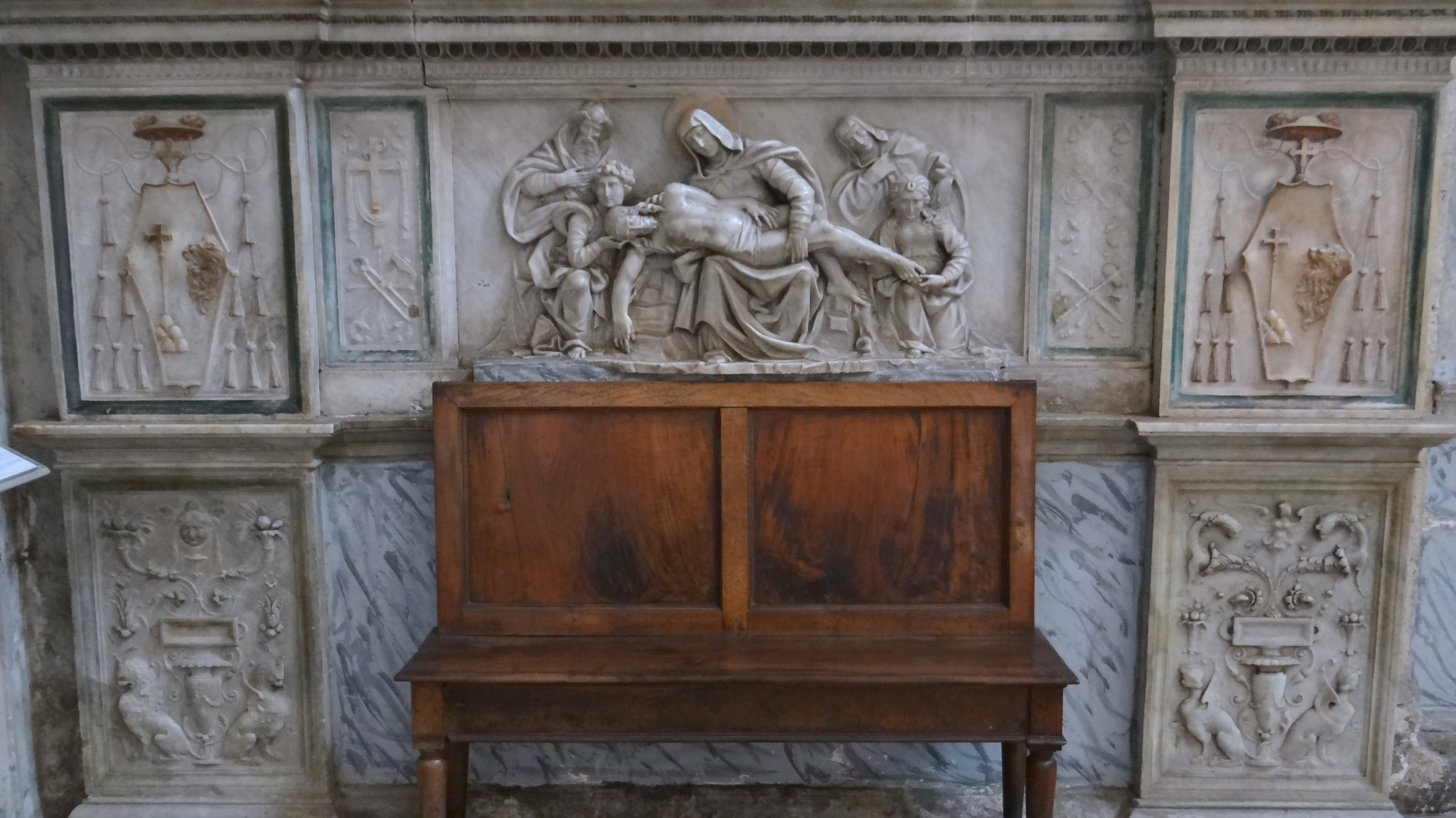
Pietà with decorative panels (Podocataro monument)

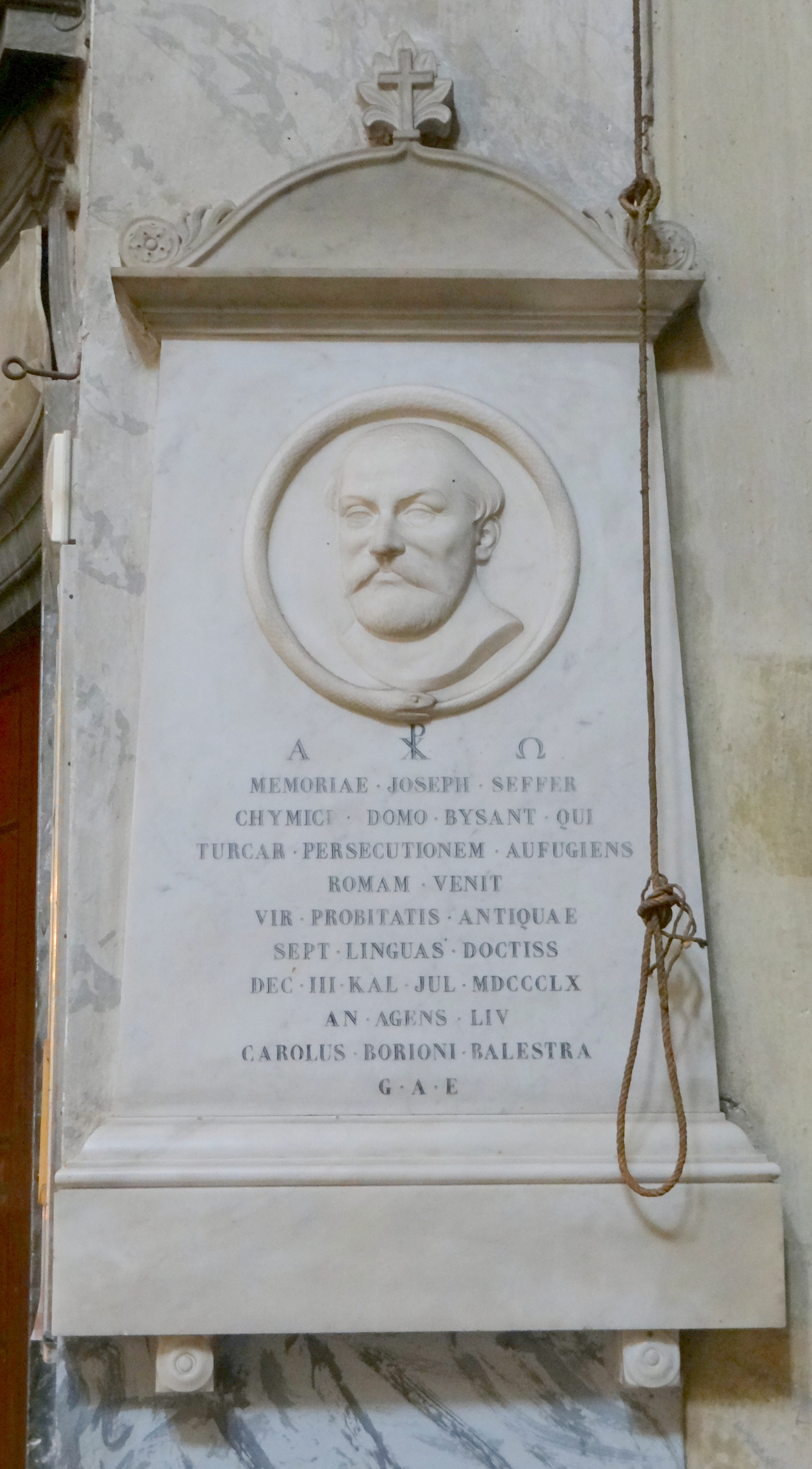
Stele of Joseph Seffer

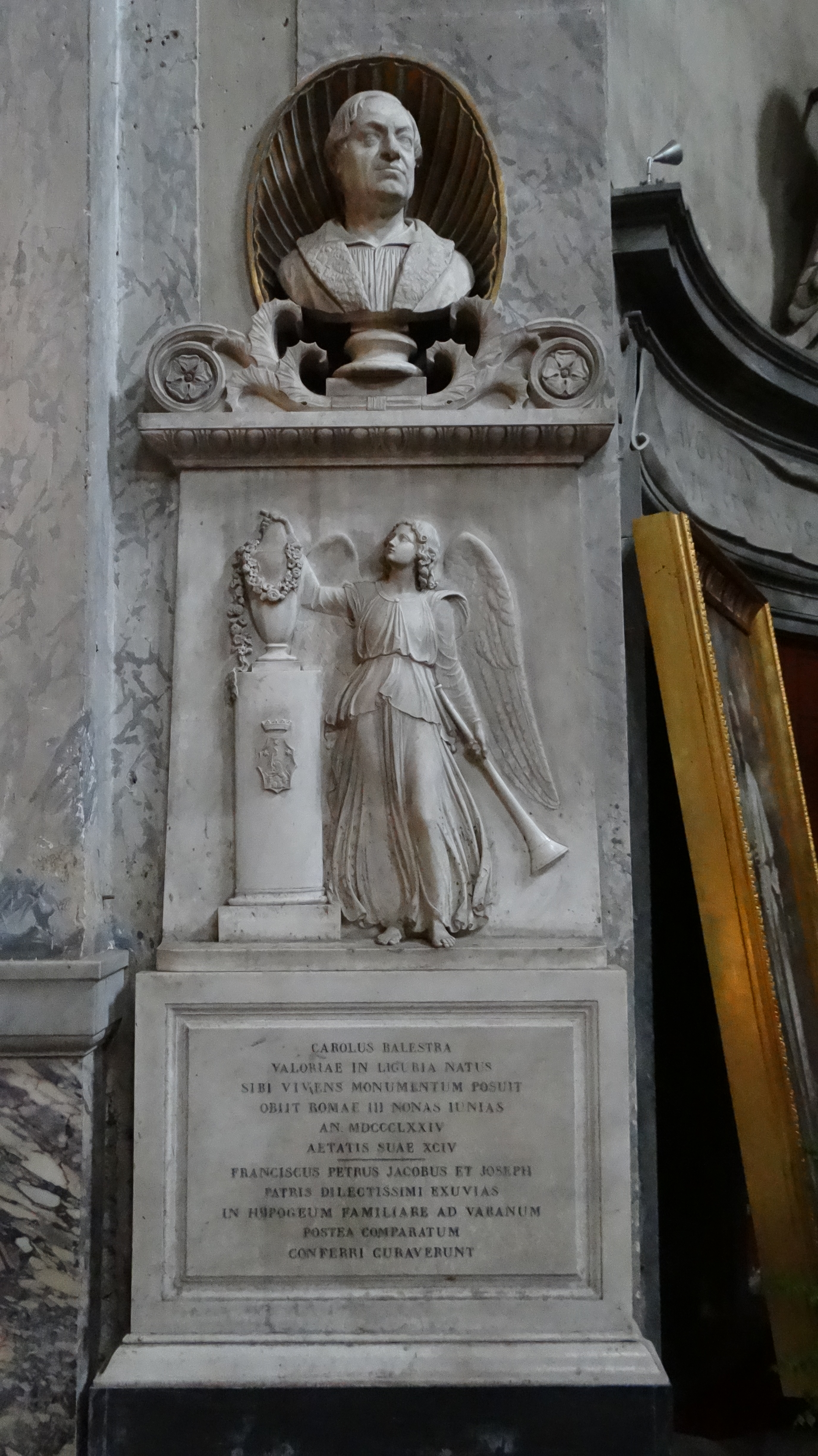
Monument of Carlo Balestra

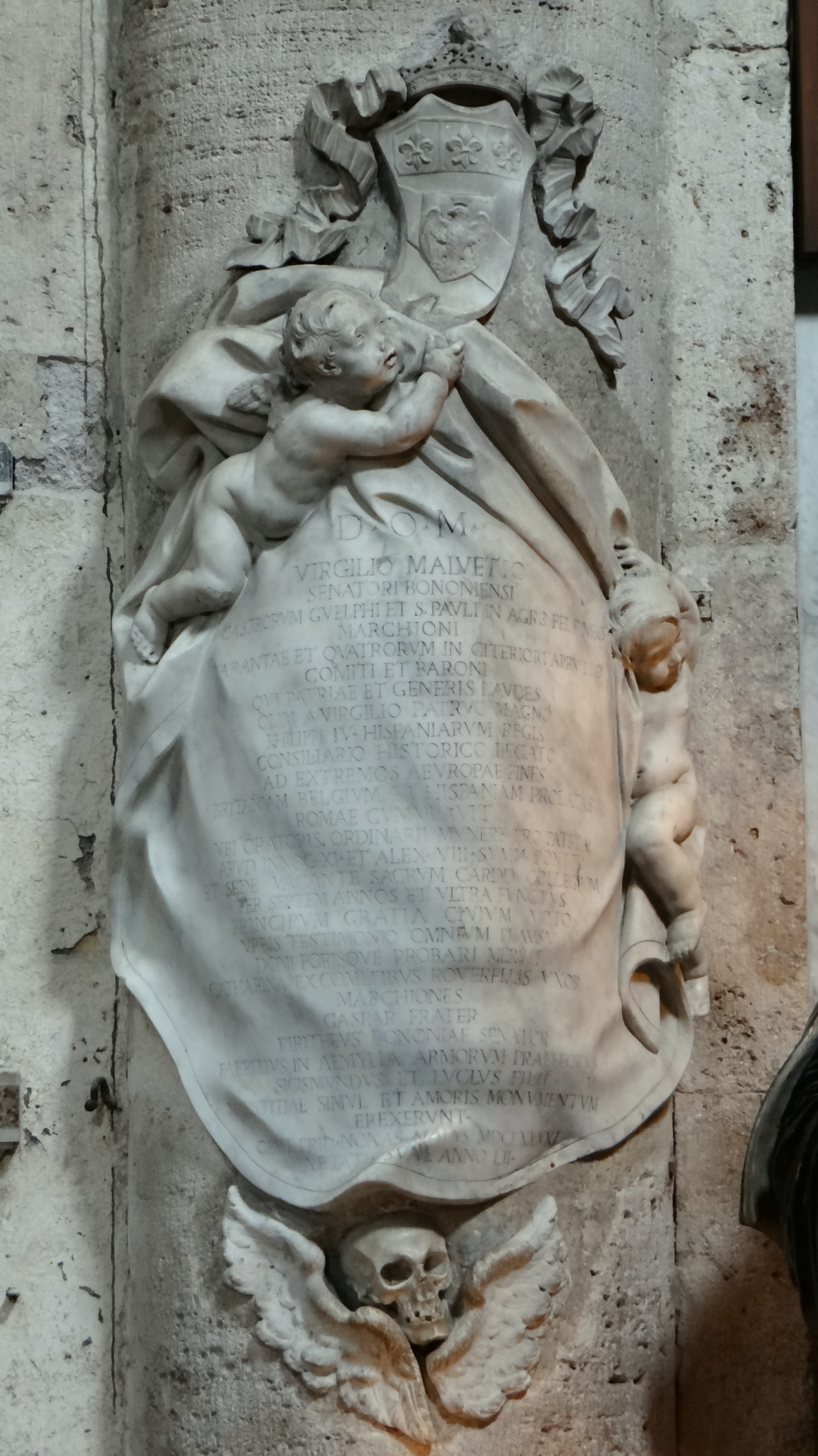
Monument of Virgilio Malvezzi

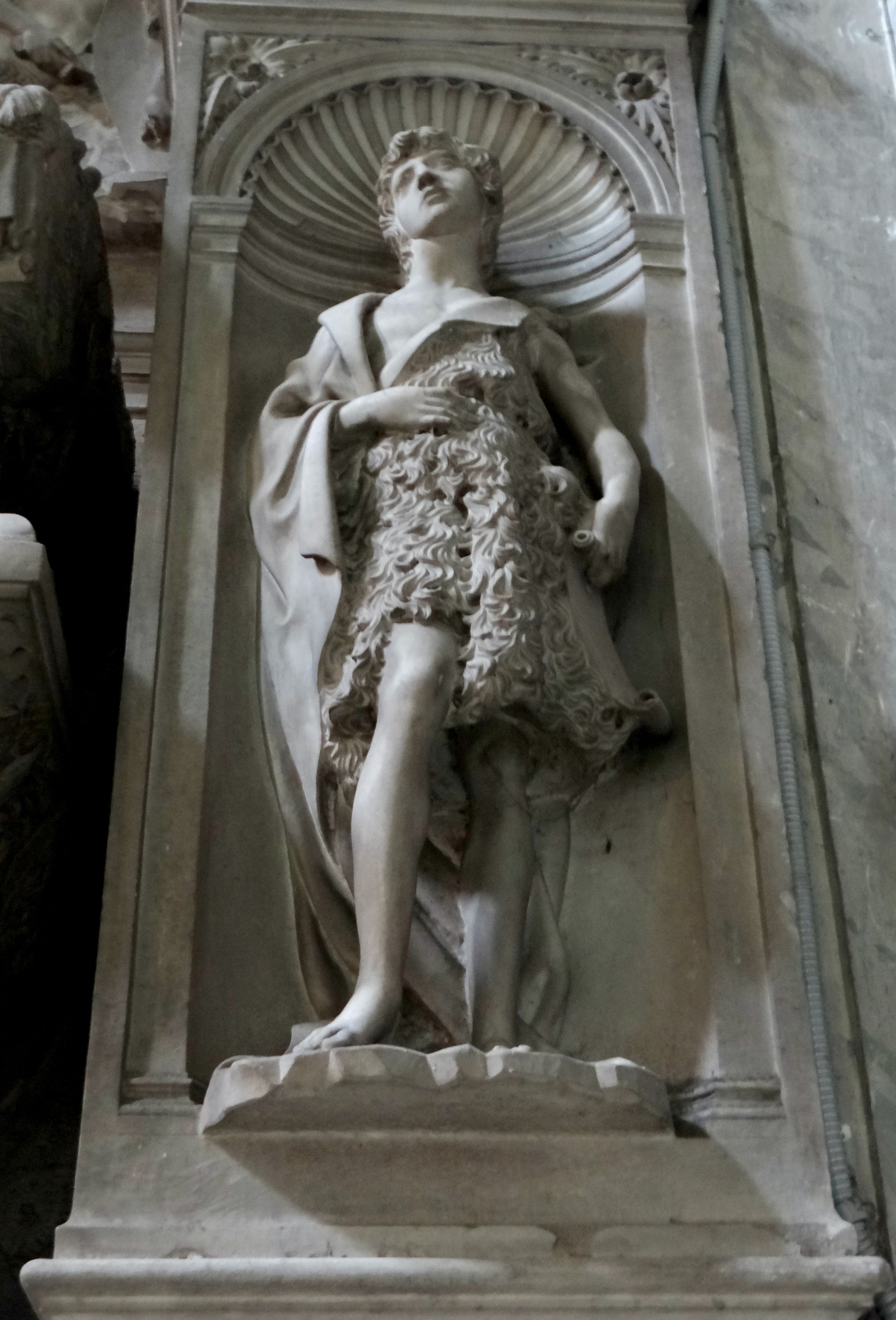
St John the Baptist on the Lonati Monument

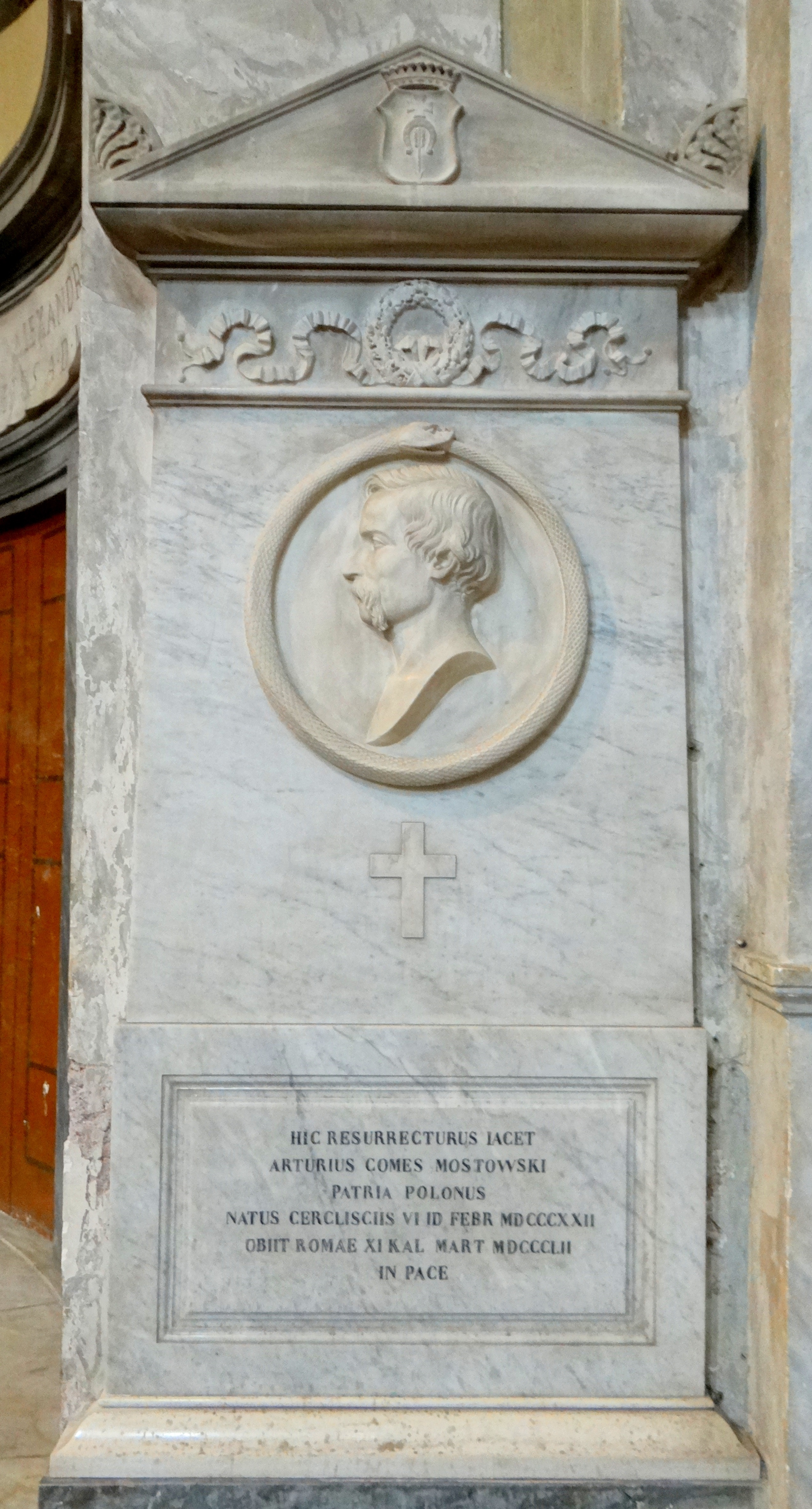
The stele of Artur Mostowski

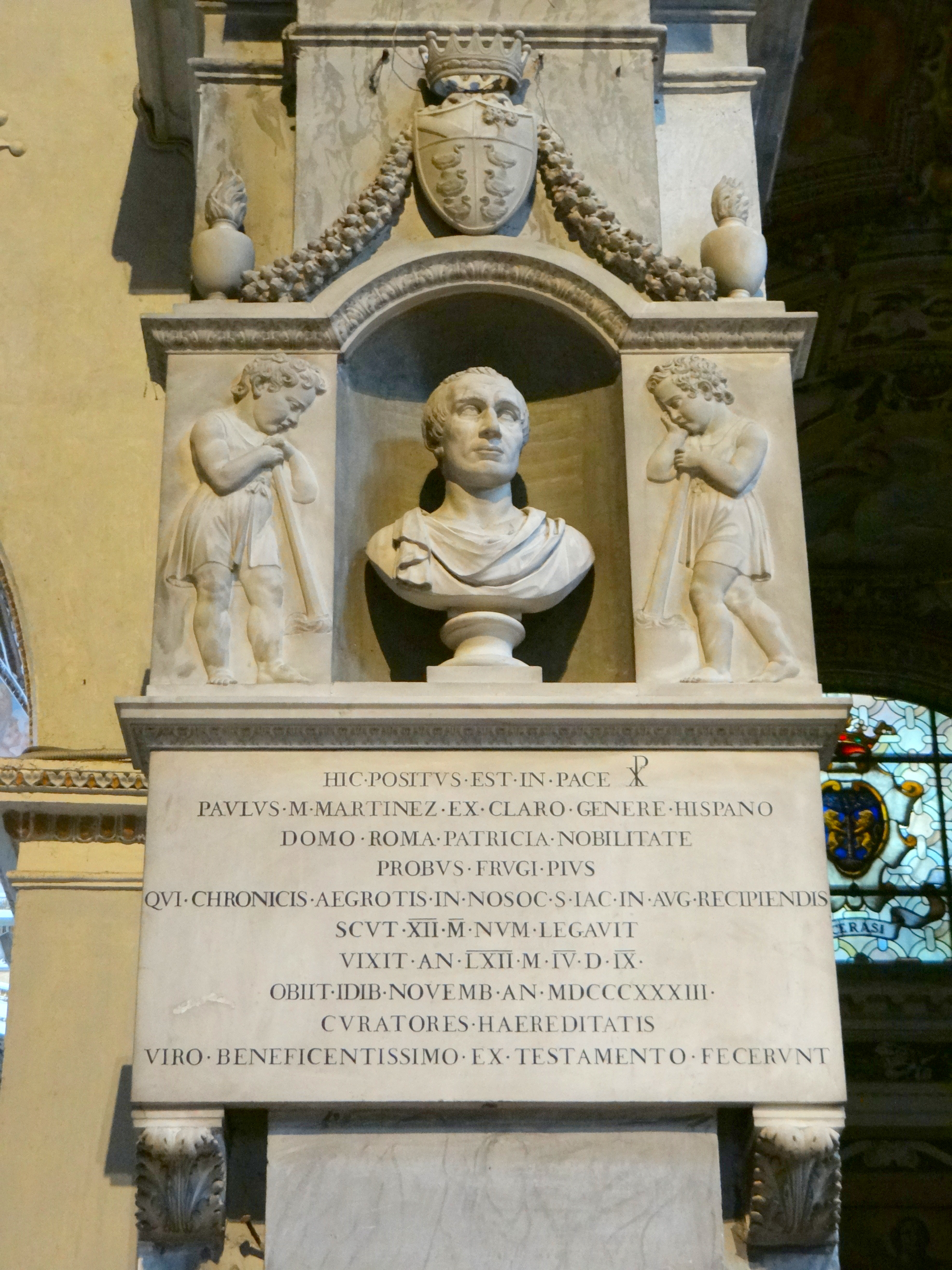
The monument of Paolo M. Martinez

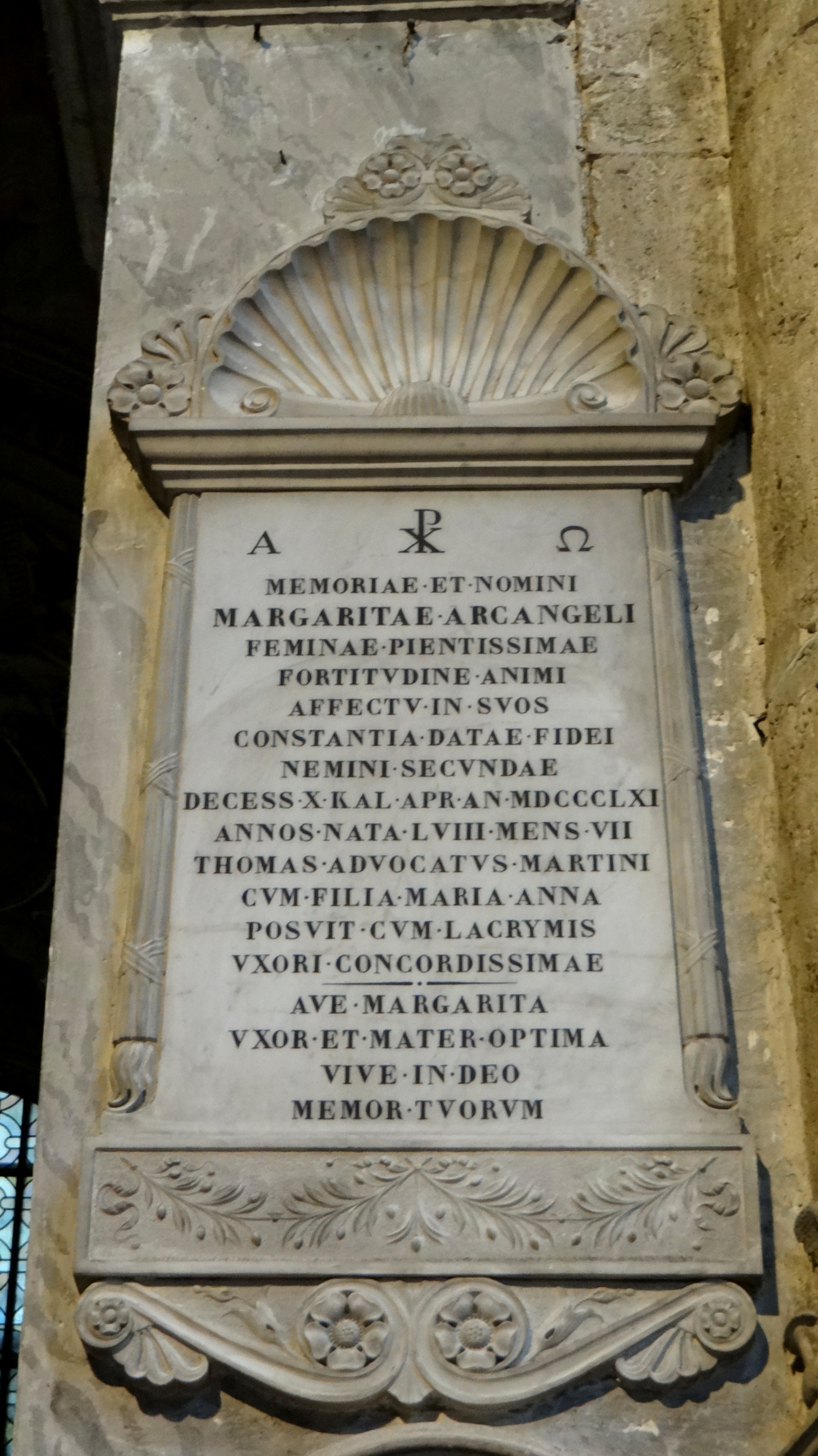
The stele of Margarita Arcangeli

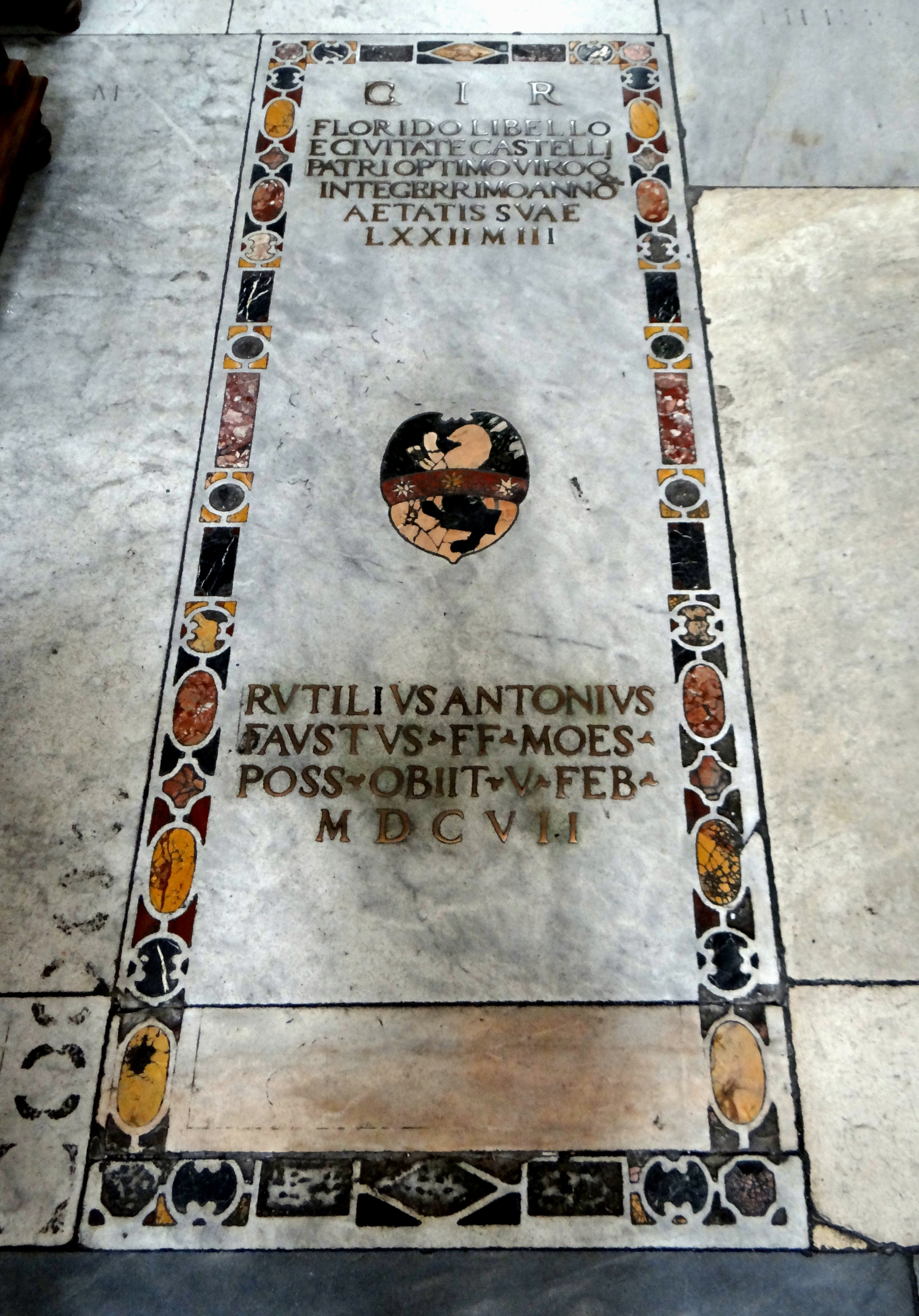
The slab of Florido Libelli

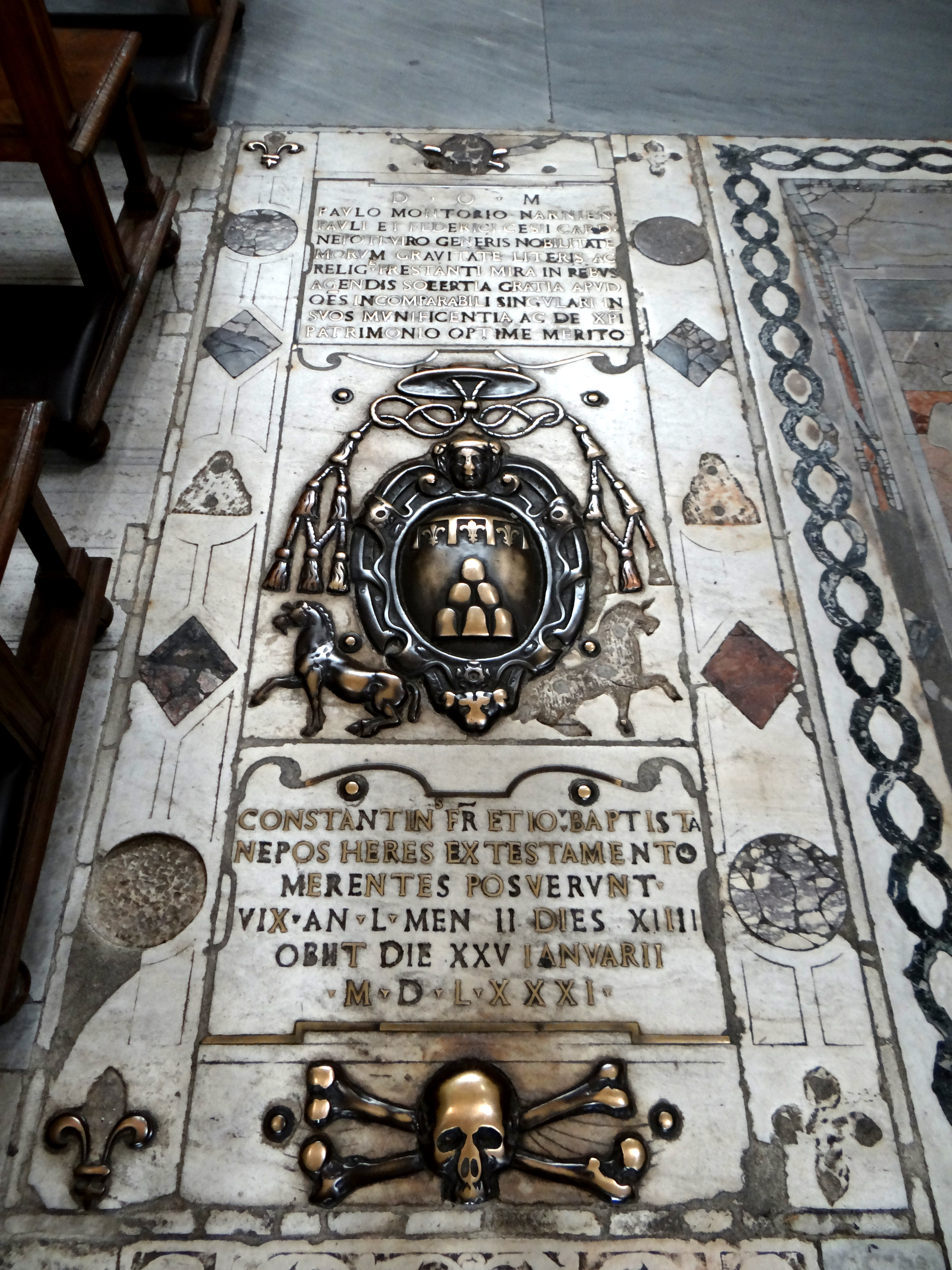
The slab of Paolo Montorio.

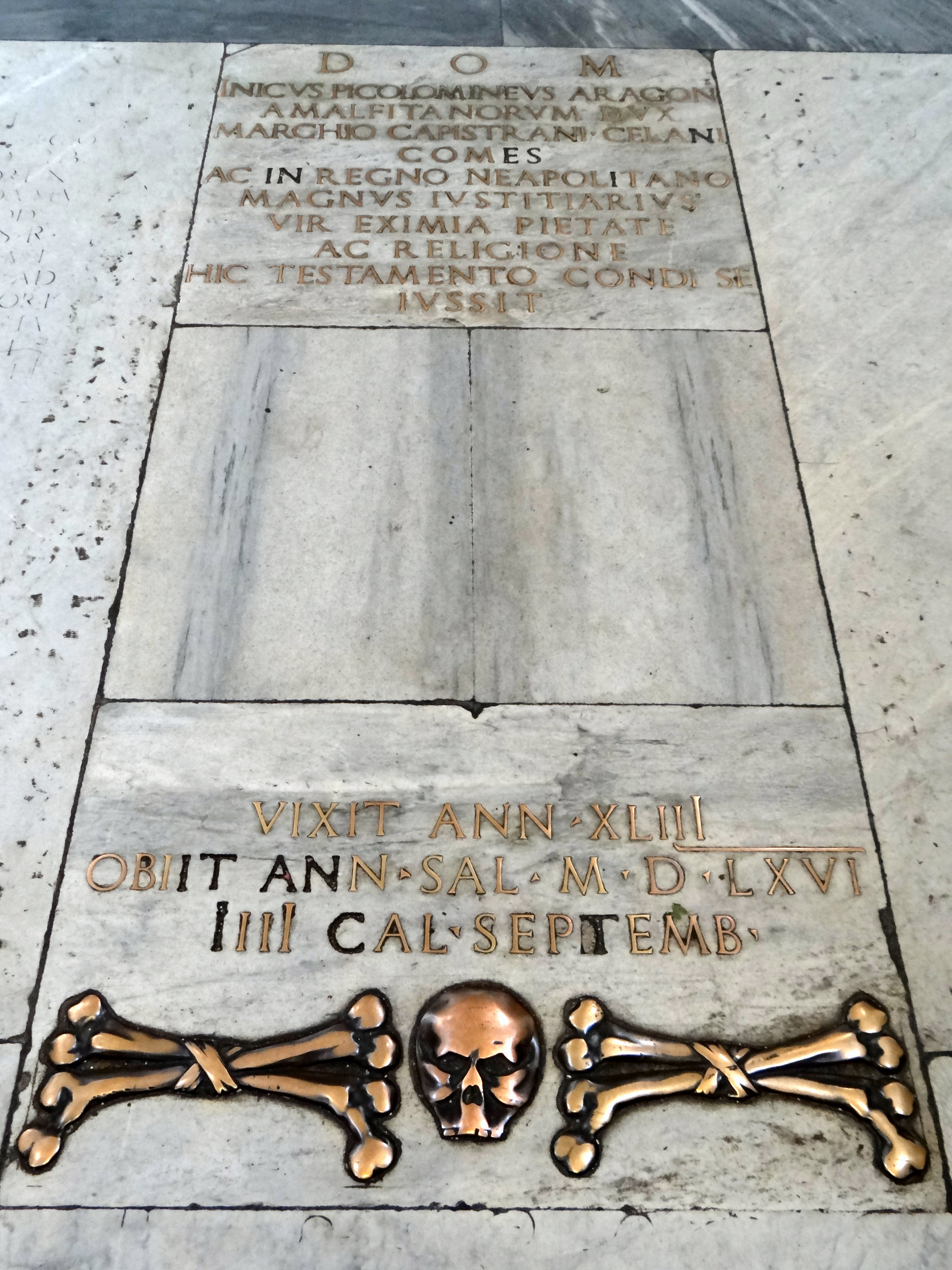
The slab of Innico Piccolomini

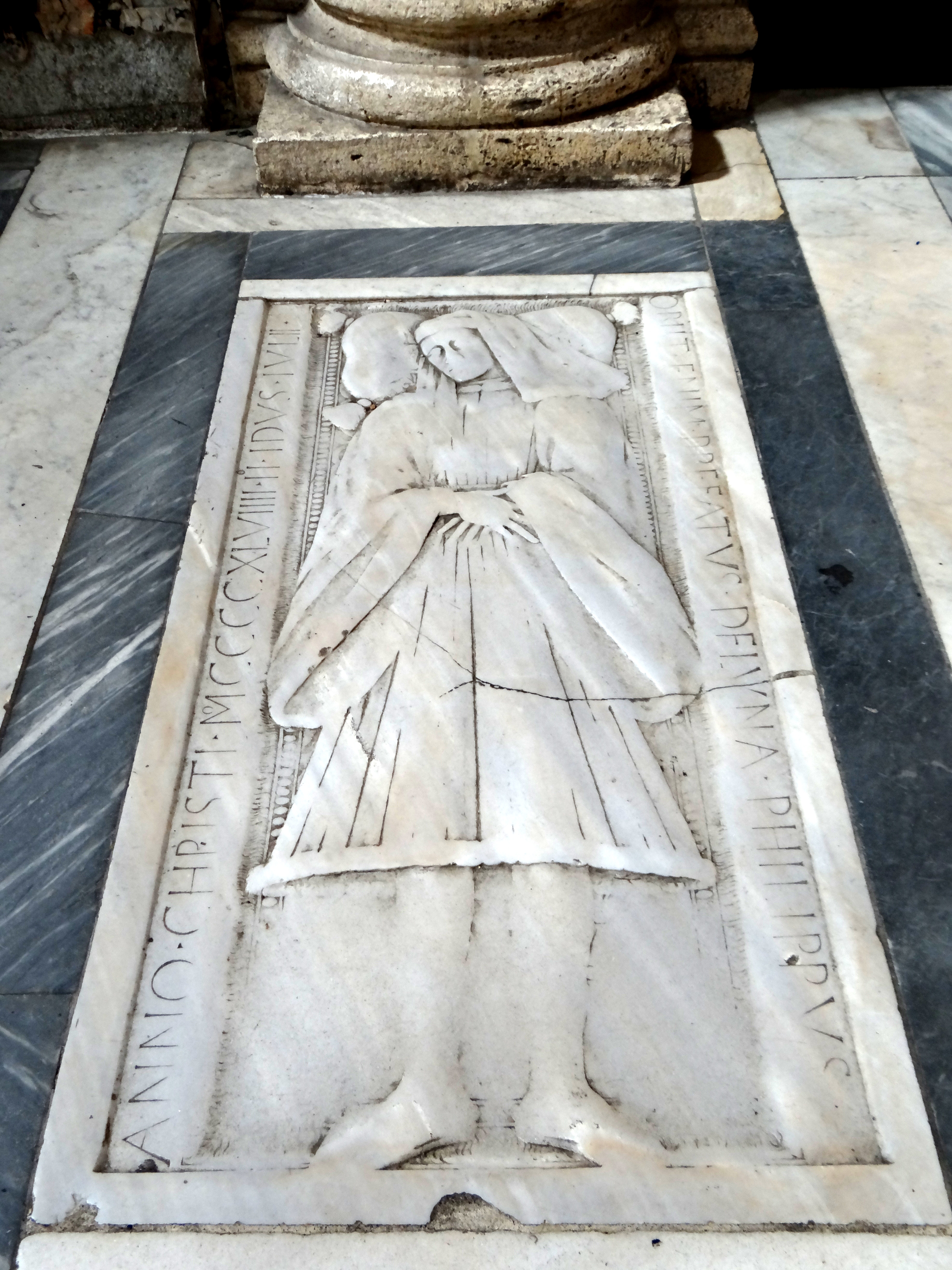
Gothic slab of Filippo de Luna
