= Joseph Heintz =

Joseph Heintz may refer to:

- Joseph Heintz the Elder (1564–1609), Swiss painter, draftsman and architect
- Joseph Heintz the Younger (1600–1678), German painter
