= Francesco Trevisani =

Italian painter (1656–1746)

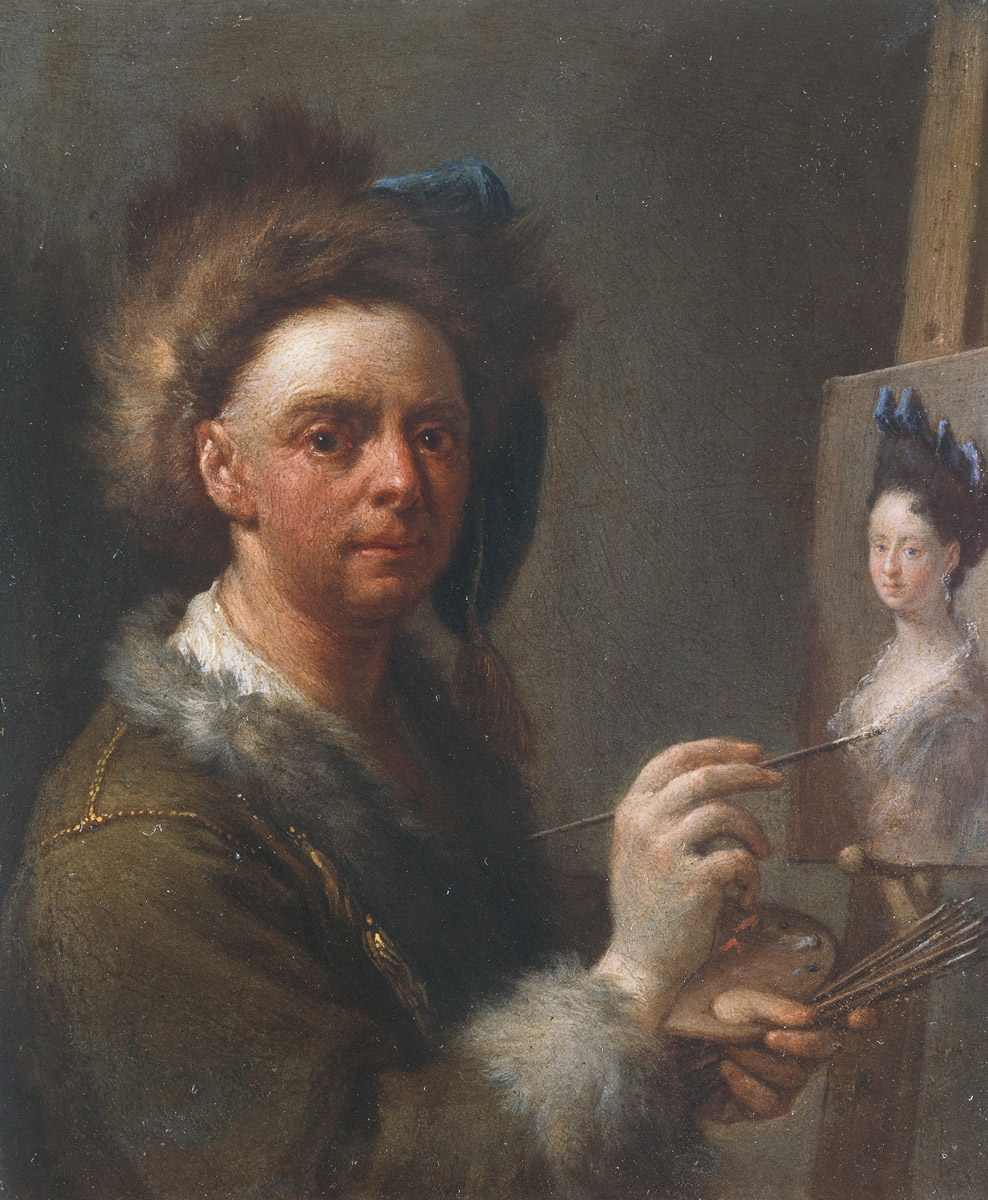
- Self-portrait (after 1701), Musée des Augustins, Toulouse
- Born: 9 April 1656; Capodistria, Republic of Venice
- Died: 30 July 1746 (aged 90); Rome, Papal States
- Education: Antonio Zanchi; Joseph Heintz the Younger
- Known for: Painting
- Movement: Barochetto

Francesco Trevisani (April 9, 1656 – July 30, 1746) was an Italian painter, active in the period called either early Rococo or late Baroque (barochetto). He was strongly influenced by Carlo Maratta, as is manifest in his masterpiece, the frescoes in San Silvestro in Capite (1695–1696).

== Life ==
=== Training and works in Venice and Rome, before 1700 ===
Born in Capodistria, Istria (modern Koper now in Slovenia, then part of the Republic of Venice), he was the son of Antonio Trevisani, an architect, by whom he was instructed in the first rudiments of design. He then studied in Venice under Antonio Zanchi and later with Joseph Heintz the Younger, who specialized in genre painting. No paintings survive from this early Venetian period, and c. 1678 Trevisani moved to Rome, where he remained until his death, in 1746. His brother, Angelo Trevisani remained a prominent painter in Venice.

In Rome, he was favoured with the patronage of Cardinal Flavio Chigi. Chigi employed him in several considerable works. His earliest surviving paintings are orientated towards Emilian and Roman classicism. The Trinity with St. Bernard and St. Catherine of Siena (1684), which was painted for the church at La Cetina, the Chigi–Zandadori villa at Cetinale, near Siena, is derived from prototypes by Guido Reni, interpreted in a soft and mannered style. This was followed by the Martyrdom of St. Stephen (Rome, Palazzo Barberini), based on Filippo Lauri’s painting of the same subject (Burghley House, Cambridgeshire). It seems likely that on Lauri's death in 1694 Trevisani inherited his role as a painter of small, delicate pictures in an Arcadian vein.

Other early works, painted for the Chigi family, such as Christ between St. Philip and St. James (1687) and the Martyrdom of the Four Crowned Saints (1688; both Siena Cathedral), reveal Trevisani's strong links with contemporary Roman artists, especially those in the circle of Maratta. However, Trevisani's compositions remain Venetian, reminiscent of those by Antonio Zanchi, as is particularly evident in the Martyrdom of the Four Crowned Saints, a lively, dramatic scene placed in an architectural setting and influenced by the works of Paolo Veronese. Trevisani's Martyrdom of St. Andrew (before 1697; Rome, Sant'Andrea delle Fratte), inspired by Mattia Preti’s frescoes in Sant'Andrea della Valle, draws closer to the Roman Baroque.

His early portraits, such as that of Jan Jachym, Count of Pachta (1696; National Gallery Prague, Sternberg Palace), a Baroque, richly painted work in the tradition of Anthony van Dyck, are extraordinarily intense. Trevisani's first major contribution to Roman art was his decoration of the chapel of the Crucifix in San Silvestro in Capite, Rome, with canvases of the Passion of Jesus and frescoes on the vault and pendentives of Putti Displaying the Instruments of the Passion. He may have won the commission through the offices of Cardinal Pietro Ottoboni, whom he probably met shortly after Cardinal Chigi's death, and who became his most important patron. In these works Trevisani drew closer to the art of Giovanni Lanfranco and Guido Reni, as in his Road to Calvary, which is indebted both to Reni's St. Andrew Led to Martyrdom (Rome, San Gregorio Magno al Celio) and also to Lanfranco's Road to Calvary in the Sacchetti Chapel in San Giovanni dei Fiorentini, Rome.

Trevisani's response to these works was further modified by his awareness of the art of Ludovico Gimignani and Giuseppe Bartolomeo Chiari, who were also decorating chapels in San Silvestro in Capite. Nevertheless, Trevisani adopted a livelier chiaroscuro than either of these artists and used sharper contrasts. Indeed, there is little doubt that he was also inspired by Francesco Solimena and learned from him how to enrich the rather tired echoes of Maratta's classicism with a new energy and freedom of handling. Thus his lunette painting, the Agony in the Garden, while modelled on Maratta's painting in Sant'Isidoro a Capo le Case, Rome, has greater dramatic power.

A similar development occurs throughout his decorations, and the Crucifixion returns to motifs from the art of the Carracci, yet reinterpreted through the more modern vision of Solimena. Trevisani's highly innovative scheme thus marks the beginnings of a new sensibility, of a softer and more sentimental art.

=== Rome, 1700–20 ===
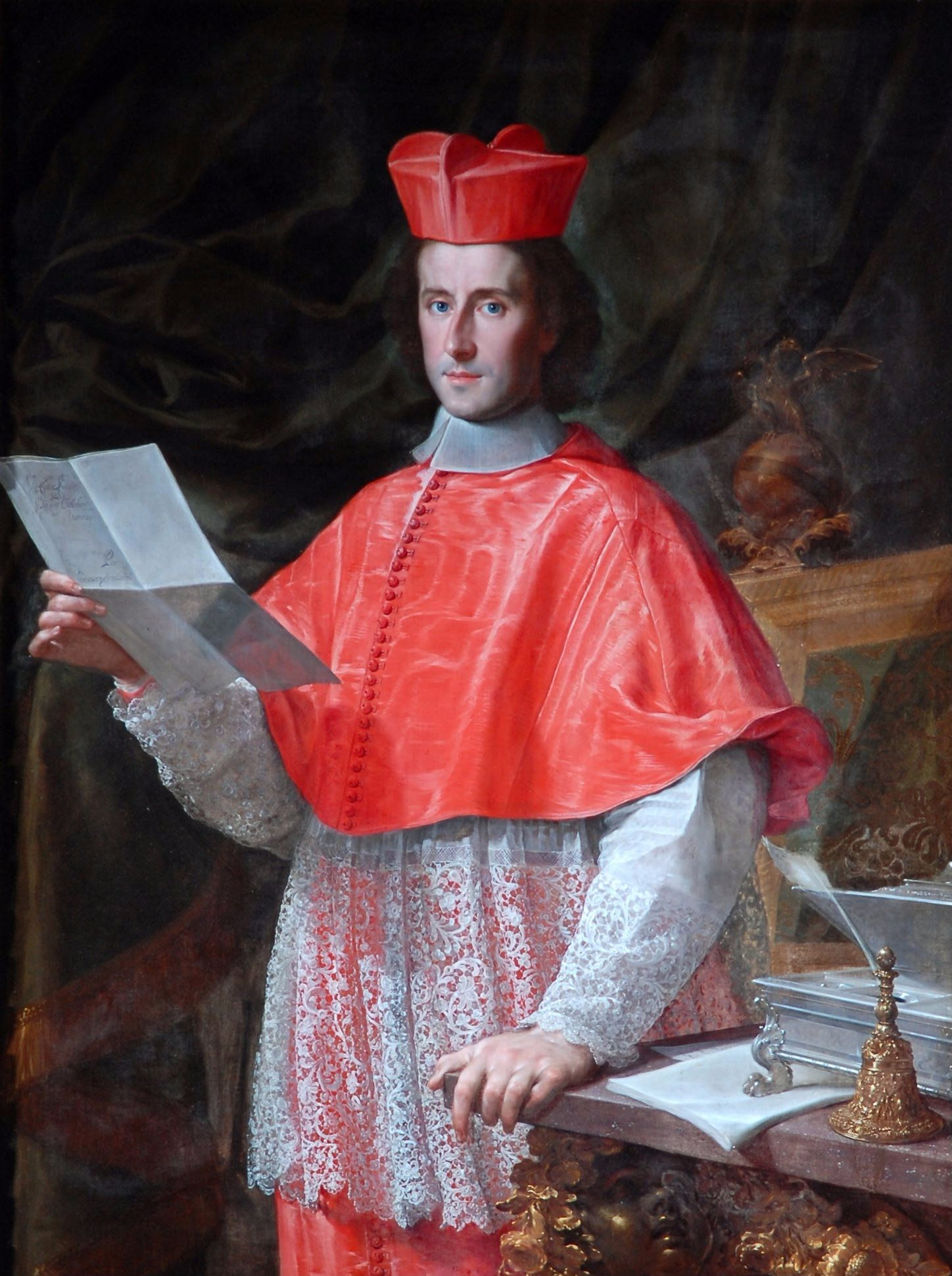
Portrait of Cardinal Pietro Ottoboni by Francesco Trevisani. The Bowes Museum, Barnard Castle, County Durham, England.

Trevisani was profoundly affected by the Pontifical Academy of Arcadia, with which he became associated through Cardinal Ottoboni, one of its most distinguished members. In these circles he also met Filippo Juvarra and the musician Arcangelo Corelli, who owned Trevisani's Virgin and Child (a copy of an original by Carlo Cignani) and a large portrait of Cardinal Ottoboni. Another portrait of Cardinal Ottoboni (1700–09; Barnard Castle, Bowes Museum), though spontaneous, is deeply rooted in the Roman portrait tradition that runs from Bernini to Andrea Sacchi, and from Jacob Ferdinand Voet to Maratta. Trevisani was well known at the Accademia by 1704, when Giovanni Mario Crescimbeni, its custodian, sang his praises in a poem, and Trevisani himself had some success as a poet. However, it was not until 1712 that he actually became a member of the Accademia, taking the name of Sanzio Echeiano.

The anti-Baroque, rationalistic tendencies of the Arcadians (associates of the Accademia) were expressed in painting in various ways by artists as diverse as Maratta, Gimignani, Daniel Seiter, Bernardo Morando and Trevisani. Nevertheless, they all shared an underlying classicism, even when attracted, as was Trevisani, by the Barochetto, and their art looks forward to that of such Venetian painters as Giovanni Battista Crosato as well as to that of François Lemoyne and Charles-Joseph Natoire.

In 1704 Trevisani began the Mass of Bolsena (Bolsena Cathedral, Cappella del Miracolo), in which the space is clearly defined and the narrative direct and lucid. The painting is evenly handled, but the colour is vivid, and the rendering of fabrics and highlights rich and brilliant. The classical composition, in the tradition of Sacchi and Maratta, contrasts sharply with the Baroque naturalism of his earlier Martyrdom of St. Andrew. The Banquet of Antony and Cleopatra (1704; Rome, Galleria Spada) illustrates his achievement as a history painter of biblical and mythological themes. Here too the lucid forms and the attention to detail lend clarity to the narrative. The richly clad figures soberly enact their roles in an elegant architectural interior.

Crescimbeni, in his Breve Notizia dello stato antico e moderno dell’Adunanza degli Arcadi (Venice, 1730), defined ‘gentle birth together with good manners’ as an essential qualification for the Arcadians, and this prescription seems to be reflected in paintings of this kind. Several other of Trevisani's paintings are stylistically close to this work. Between 1708 and 1717 he painted a series of works for Prince–Bishop Lothar Franz von Schönborn, most of which remain at Pommersfelden in the Schloss Weißenstein. Such religious paintings as the Repentant Magdalene (Pommersfelden, Schloss Weißenstein) reflect the style of Maratta and Reni, while in such mythological pictures as Luna and Endymion (Pommersfelden, Schloss Weißenstein) Trevisani returned to the art of Lauri, which he interpreted with greater richness.

In 1717 Trevisani sent a strikingly immediate Self-portrait (Pommersfelden, Schloss Weißenstein) as a gift for the Prince. Trevisani's style oscillates between the Barochetto and the classicism of Maratta, as, for example, in Dead Christ Supported by Angels (1705–10; Vienna, Kunsthistorisches Museum), which unites Baroque pathos and chiaroscuro with a classical composition. The austere scenes (finished 1715 ) of the Life of Saint Joseph and of the Death of St. Joseph that decorate the chapel of St. Lucy in Narni Cathedral contrast with the more sensuous and colourful Flight into Egypt (Dresden, Gemäldegalerie Alte Meister), which looks forward to François Boucher, and Joseph Sold by his Brethren ( 1714; Melbourne, National Gallery of Victoria), which echoes Lauri. Trevisani's art is very different from Maratta's strict adherence to the style of Raphael, a tradition upheld by such contemporary Roman artists as Andrea Procaccini. In fact it has closer parallels with the art of Benedetto Luti and Marcantonio Franceschini.

=== Late works, 1720–46 ===
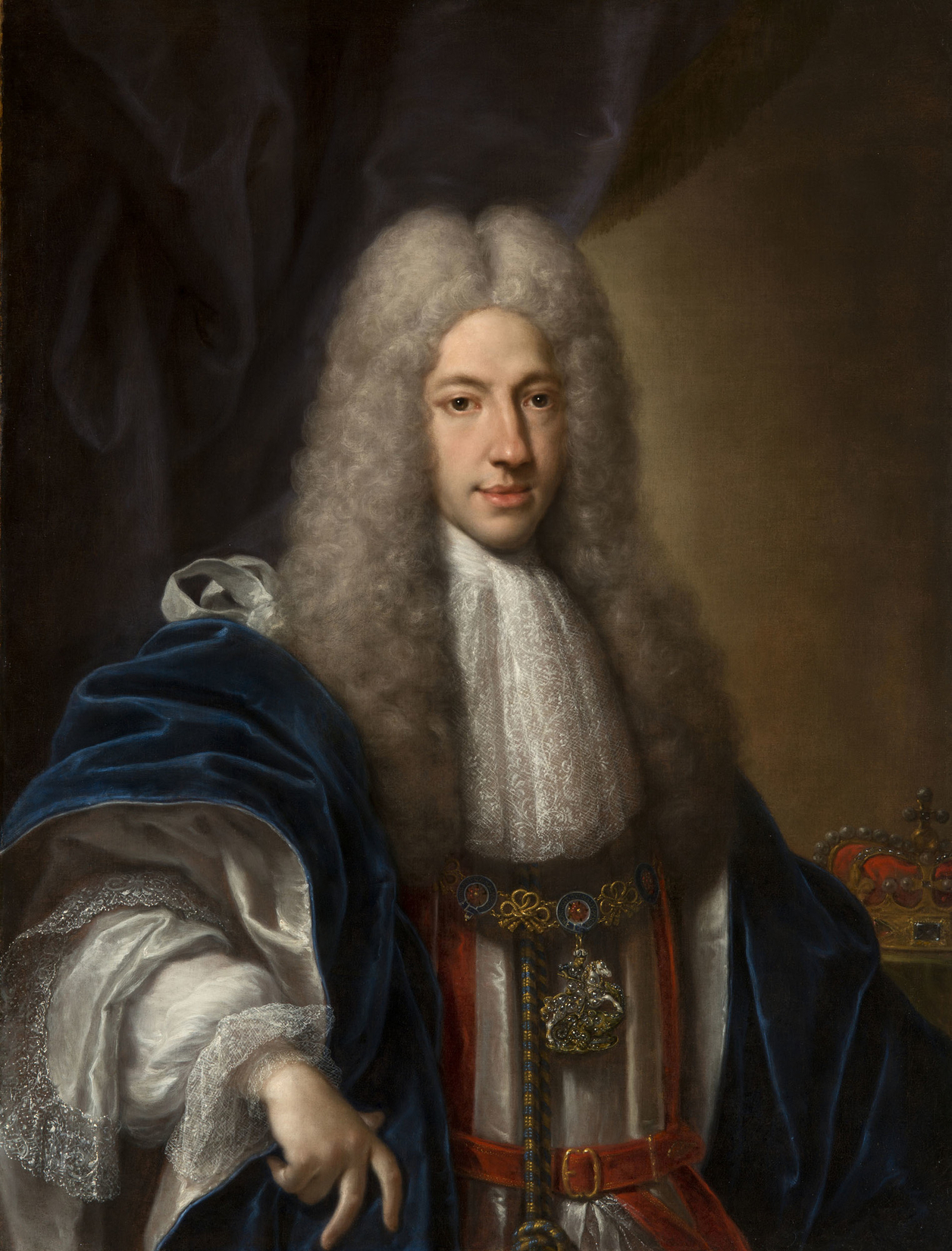
Portrait of Prince James Francis Edward Stuart by Francesco Trevisani, Edinburgh, Holyrood Palace, Royal Collection

In Trevisani's late works there are no substantial changes in style. Some of his portraits, such as Prince James Francis Edward Stuart (Edinburgh, Holyrood Palace, Royal Collection), are distinguished by a new formality, while a more intimate tone was used for portraits of other members of the Jacobean court visiting Rome, such as the portraits of David Murray, 6th Viscount of Stormont and James Murray, Titular Earl of Dunbar (both Scone Palace, Tayside). Such intimacy is rarely found in Trevisani's female portraits, which are graceful and elegant but often rather conventional in treatment, as in the portrait of Marjorie Murray (Scone Palace, Tayside).

In his religious paintings Trevisani's compositions tend to be simpler and more restrained and space is defined by the positioning of a few sparse figures. Such paintings as the Vision of St. Anthony of Padua (c. 1721–4; Rome, Santissime Stimmate di San Francesco), the Immaculate Conception with St. Louis of France and the Blessed Amadeus of Savoy (1724; University of Turin, Aula Magna), commissioned by Filippo Juvarra for the chapel at the Palace of Venaria, Victor Amadeus II’s hunting-lodge outside Turin, and the St. Turibius (1726; Rome, Sant'Anastasia) amply document this last phase of the painter's activity.

To the same period belong the cartoons for the mosaics in the Baptismal of St. Peter's Basilica, Rome. This project was begun by Giovanni Battista Gaulli, and passed to Trevisani on Gaulli's death in 1709. Trevisani worked on it intermittently from 1710, but with increasing intensity in the 1730s and 1740s. The cartoons (Rome, St Peter's, Loggia delle Benedizioni), of scenes of Baptism , attain an unexpected grandeur through the use of radically simplified, powerful figures. The effects of chiaroscuro strongly suggest the renewed influence of Solimena, and at the same time echo the Baroque art of Lanfranco and Luca Giordano. Here the exquisite refinement of Trevisani's early work yields to a new monumentality, although the modelli for the Four Continents of the World (c. 1709; Rome, Palazzo Barberini) remain subtle and evocative. The mosaics from this design were executed by Giuseppe Ottaviani, Liborio Fattori and Giovanni Battista Brughi (1660–1730).

In Trevisani's last altarpieces we find little innovation: his St. Matthew Resuscitating the Son of the King of Ethiopia (after 1730; Pisa) is a magniloquent and original painting, but the Miracle of St. Anthony of Padua (1734; Venice, San Rocco) reuses earlier ideas, as does the Martyrdom of St. Lawrence (c. 1735; San Filippo Neri, Turin) and the Family of Darius before Alexander (1735), commissioned by Juvarra for the throne room at Real Sitio de San Ildefonso. Here Trevisani, at the height of his success, was occupied on a decorative scheme that included works by Sebastiano Conca, Francesco Imperiali, Placido Costanzi, Donato Creti, Giambattista Pittoni, Solimena and Charles-André van Loo. In the Family of Darius he returned to a subject treated by Veronese and handles it with a felicitous classicizing touch, in the manner of Charles Le Brun. Trevisani died in Rome in 1746. Among his pupils were Francesco Civalli of Perugia, Cav. Lodovico Mazzanti, and Giovanni Batista Bruglii.

== Works ==
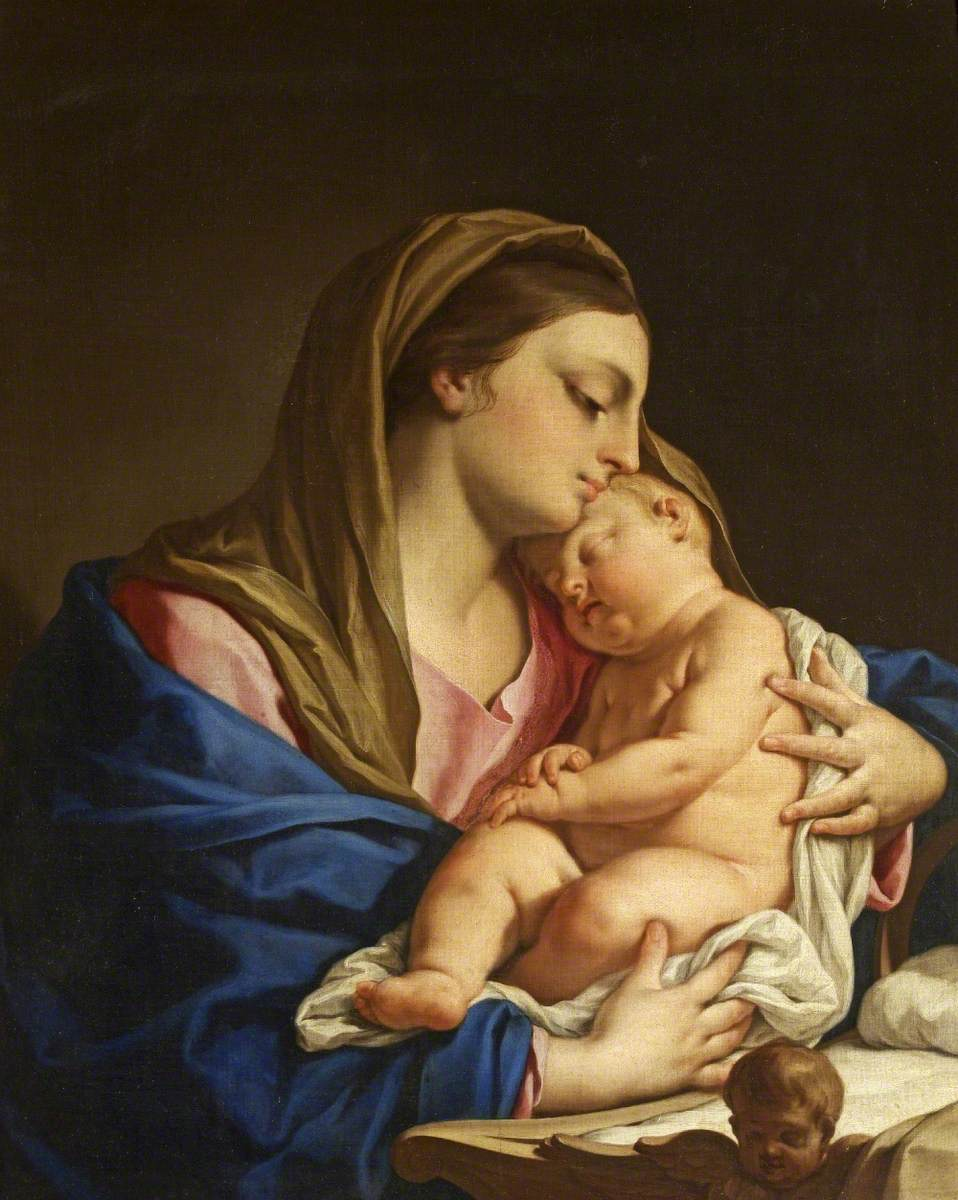
Madonna and Child, c. 1700, London, National Trust

- Martyrdom of St. Andrew, Sant'Andrea delle Fratte, Rome
- Stigmata of St. Francis, Santissime Stimmate di San Francesco, Rome
- Frescos at Santa Chiara (St. Clare) chapel, San Silvestro in Capite, Rome
- Prophet Baruch, San Giovanni in Laterano, Rome
- Altar of the Ecstasy of Saint Francis at the Santissime Stimmate di San Francesco (Holy Stigmata of St. Francis)
- Suicide of Lucretia (between 1680 and 1740)
- Banquet of Cleopatra and Mark Anthony (1702), Palazzo Spada, Rome
- Portrait of Cardinal Pietro Ottoboni, Bowes Museum, Durham, England
- The Raising of Lazarus
- Saint Mark
- Saint Matthew
- Madonna and Child
- Peter Baptizing the Centurion Cornelius (1709)
- Death of Alexander the Great, Musée des beaux-arts de Pau, France
- Maria Clementina (1719)
- Apelles Painting Campaspe (1720)
- Apollo and Daphne (mid-18th century)
- Diana and Endymion
- Latona and the Frogs
- Penitent Magdalene (1725) Prado Museum, Madrid.
- Madonna with Child (1708–1710) Prado Museum. Madrid.
- Madonna with sleeping Child (att) Real Academia de Bellas Artes de San Fernando, Madrid.
- Works at Palazzo Corsini, Rome:
  - Martyrdom of St Lawrence
  - Martyrdom of St Lucia
  - Mary Magdalene

In January 2021 an episode of the BBC Four series Britain's Lost Masterpieces, centred on the fine art collection of the Royal Pavilion in Brighton, uncovered a work of Trevisani, a portrayal of Mary Magdalene, previously attributed to an unknown artist.

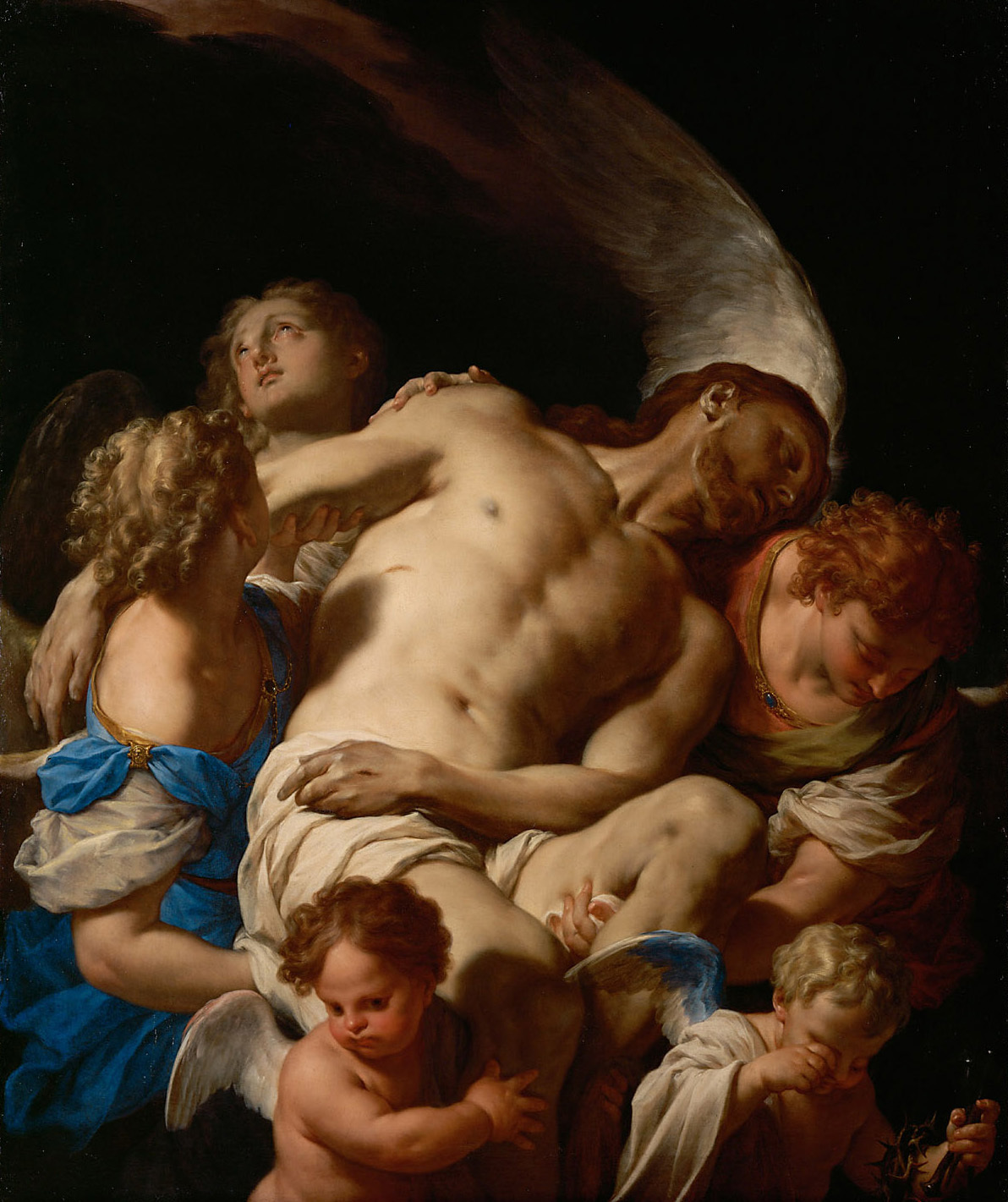
Christ Supported by Angels, c. 1705, Kunsthistorisches Museum, Vienna

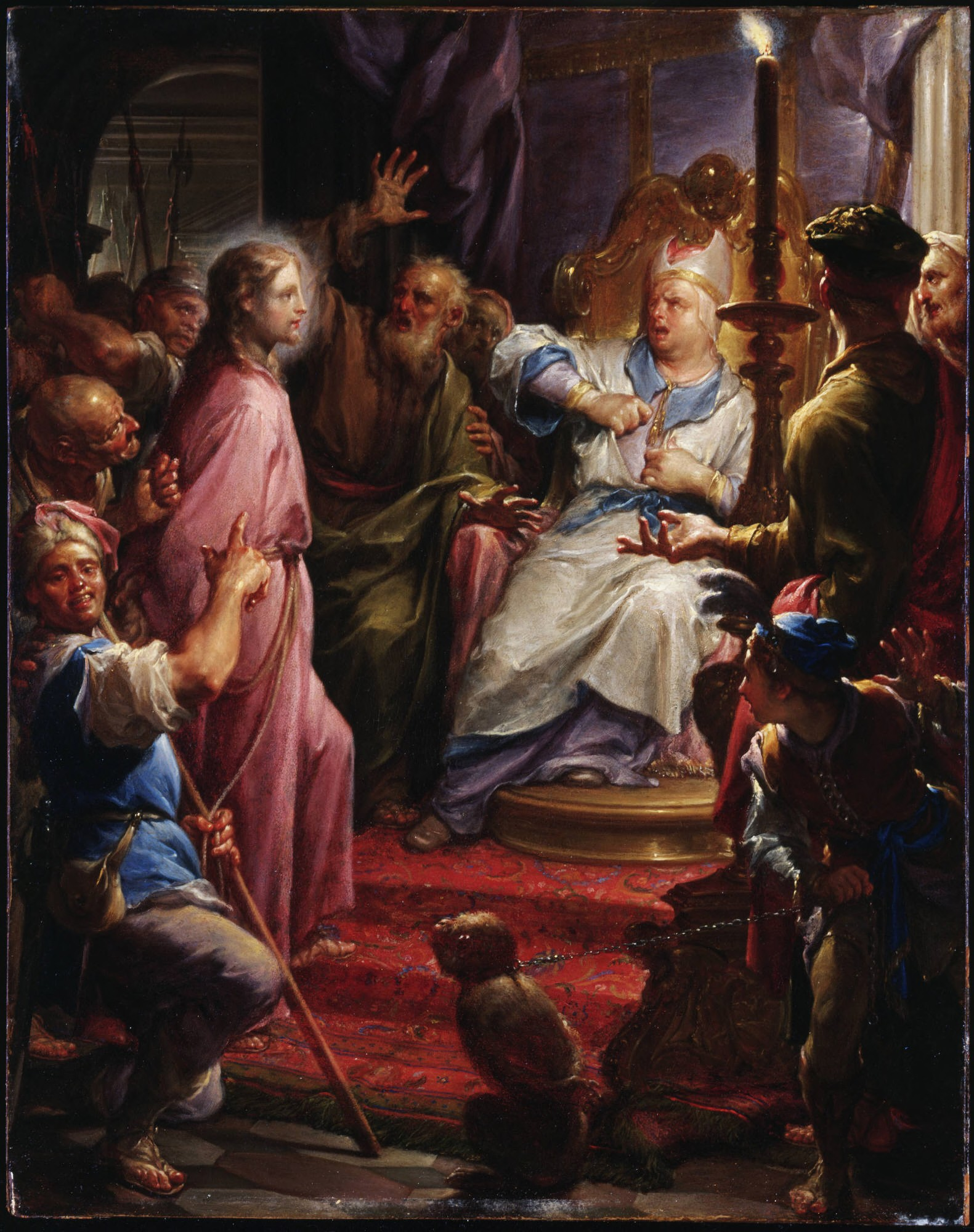
Christ Before Caiaphas, c. 1705, Princeton University Art Museum, Princeton

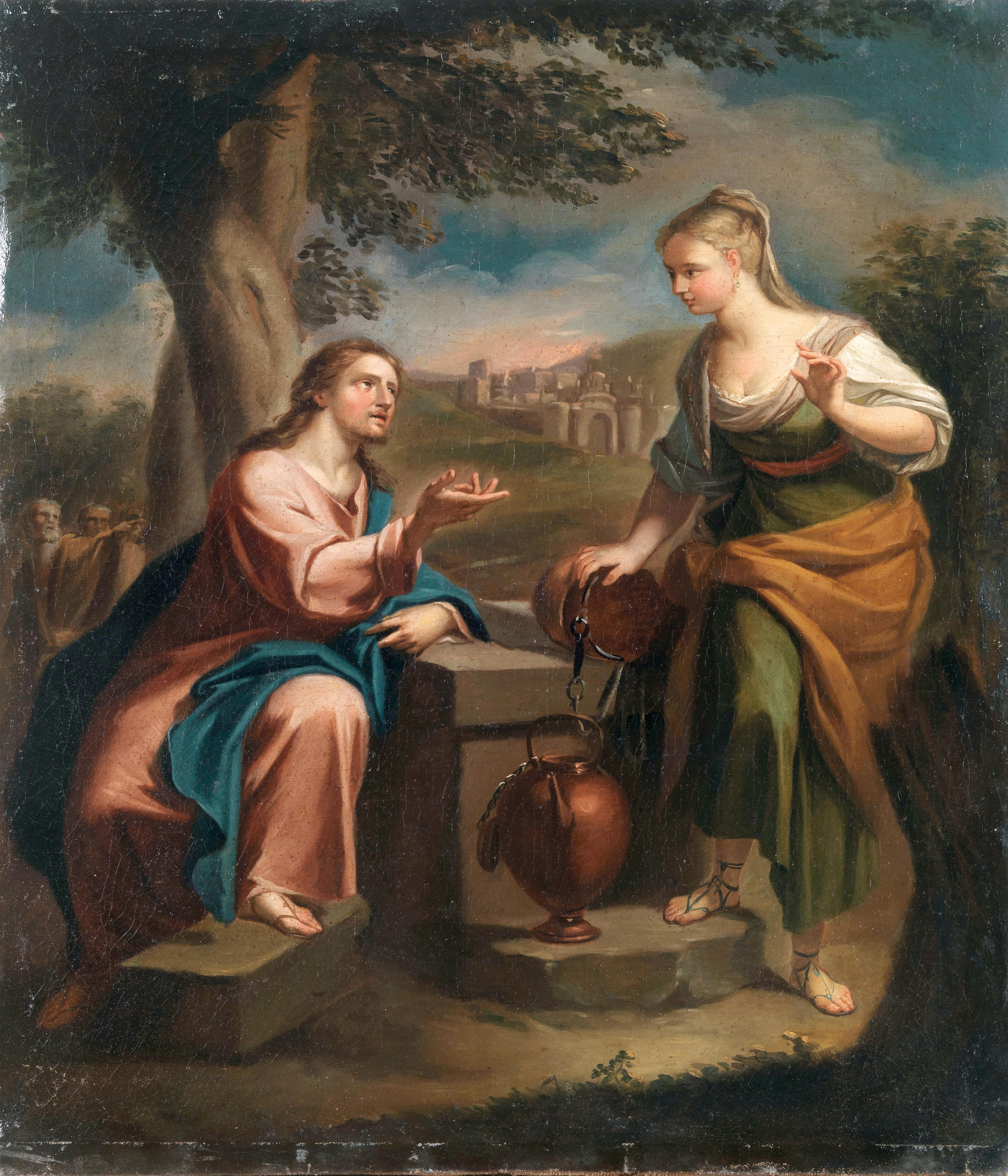
Christ and the Samaritan Woman at the Well, c. 1705, priv. col.

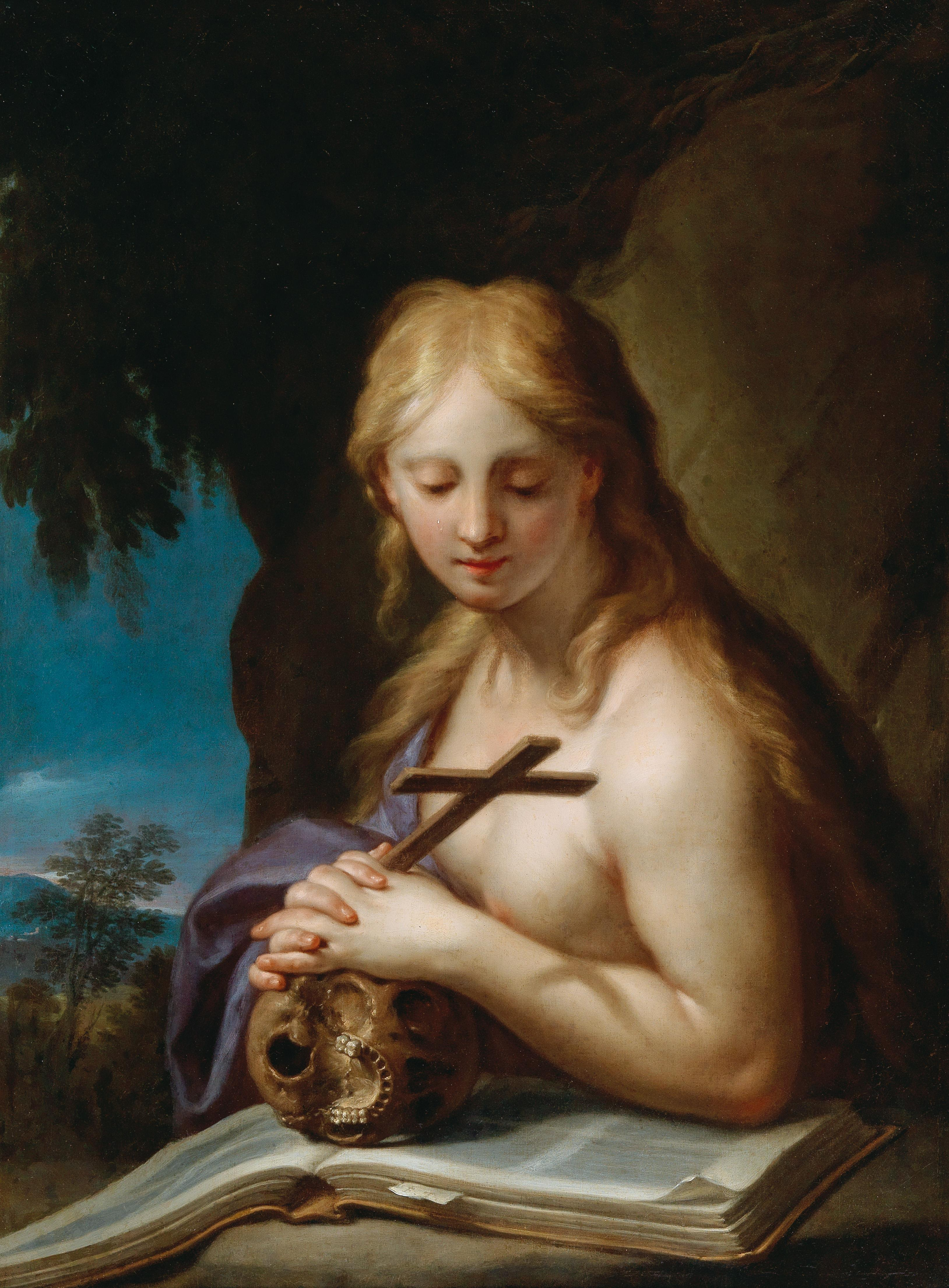
The penitent Magdalene, c. 1695, priv. col.

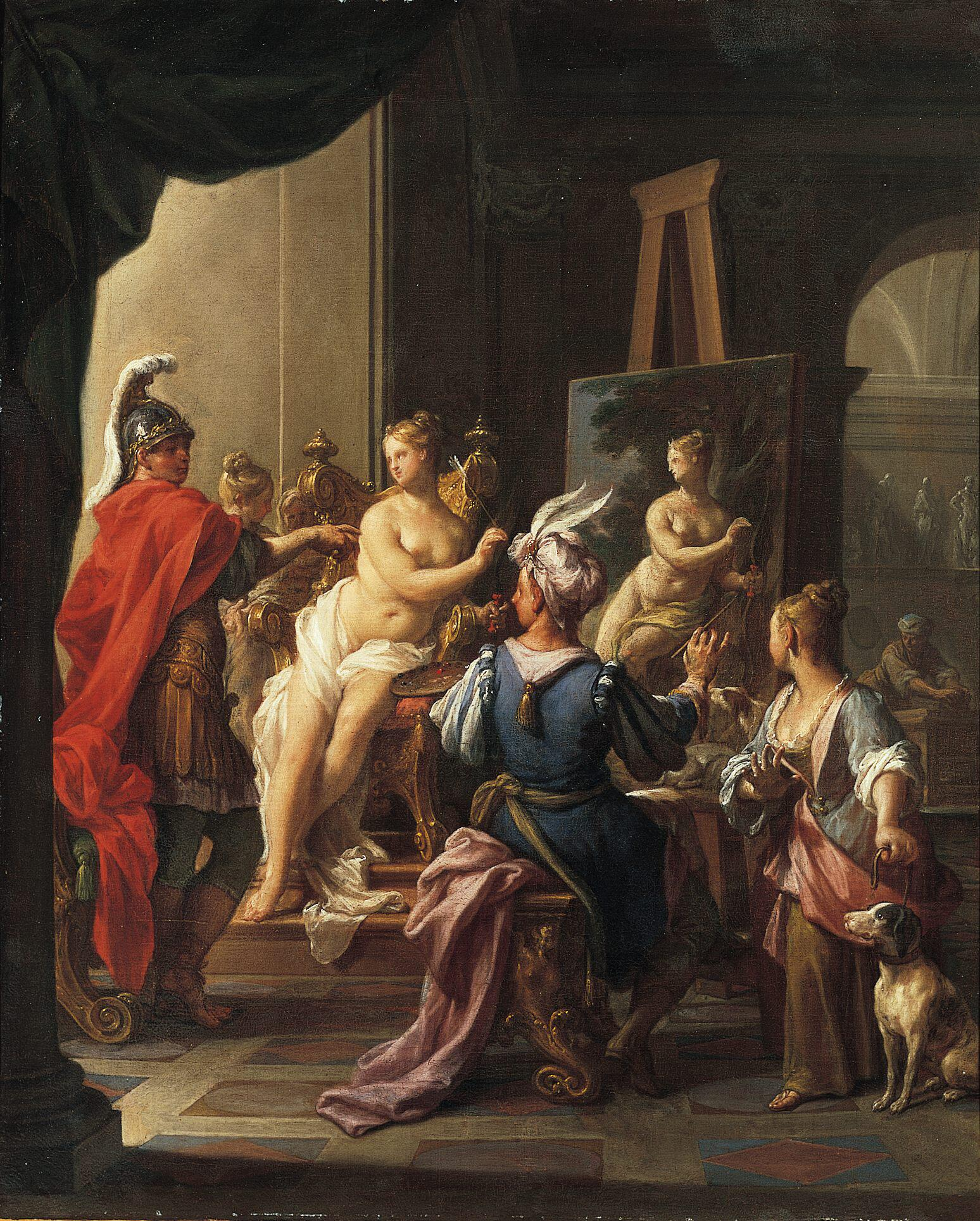
Apelles Painting Campaspe, 1720, Norton Simon Museum, Pasadena, California

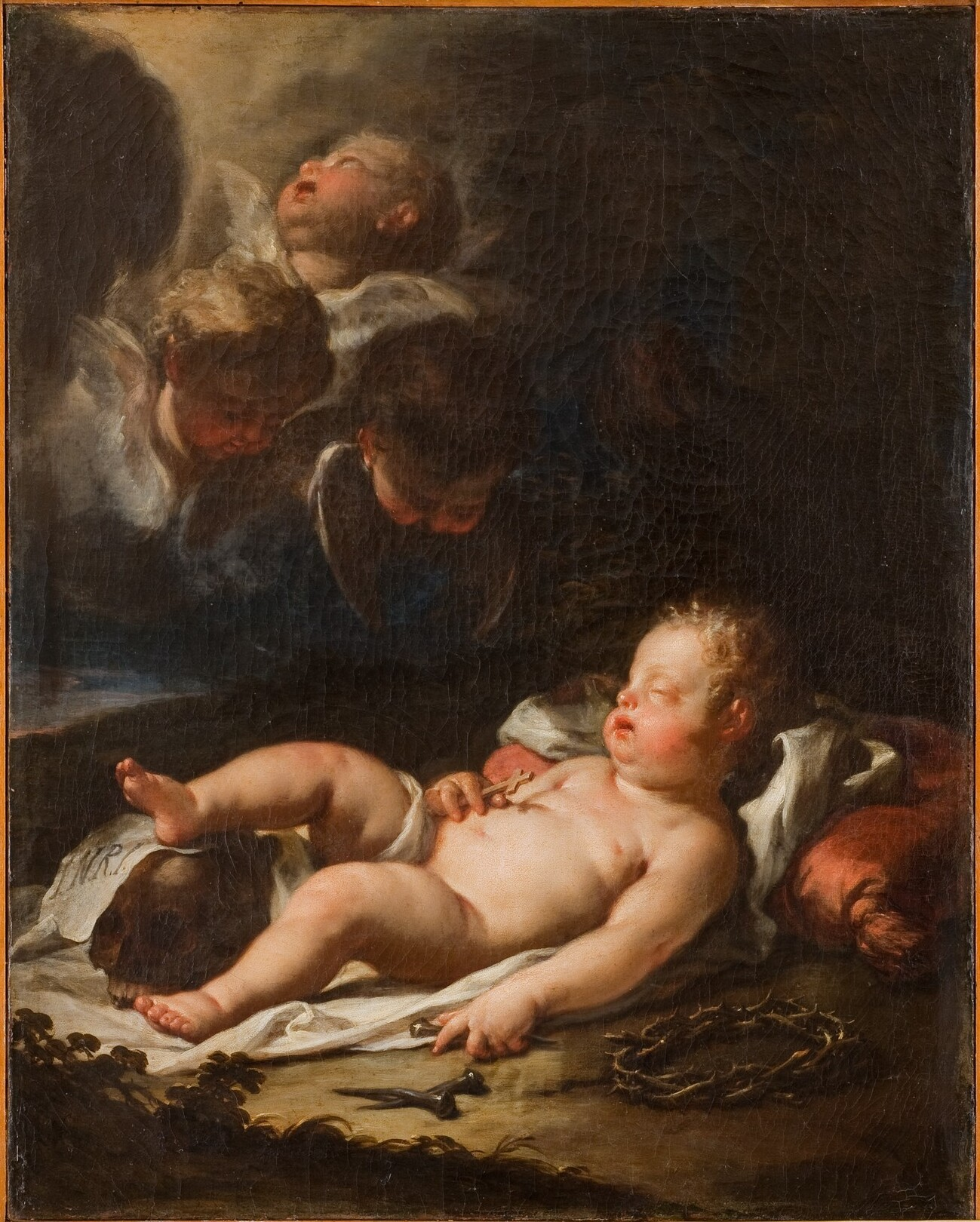
Child Jesus sleeping , c. 1695, Musée Fabre, Montpellier

=== Etchings and Drawings ===
- Andrea Adami da Bolsena

== See also ==
- Sebastiano Conca
- Accademia di San Luca
- Jacopo Zoboli
- Pompeo Batoni

== Bibliography ==
- Di Federico, F.R. (1977). Francesco Trevisani: Eighteenth-Century Painter in Rome. Washington DC.
- Review of Francesco Trevisani: Eighteenth-Century Painter in Rome. Francis H. Dowley. The Art Bulletin (1979) pp. 146–151.
- Bryan, Michael (1889). Walter Armstrong; Robert Edmund Graves (eds.). Dictionary of Painters and Engravers, Biographical and Critical. Vol. II L-Z. London: George Bell and Sons. p. 585.
