= Carlo Lamparelli =

Italian painter

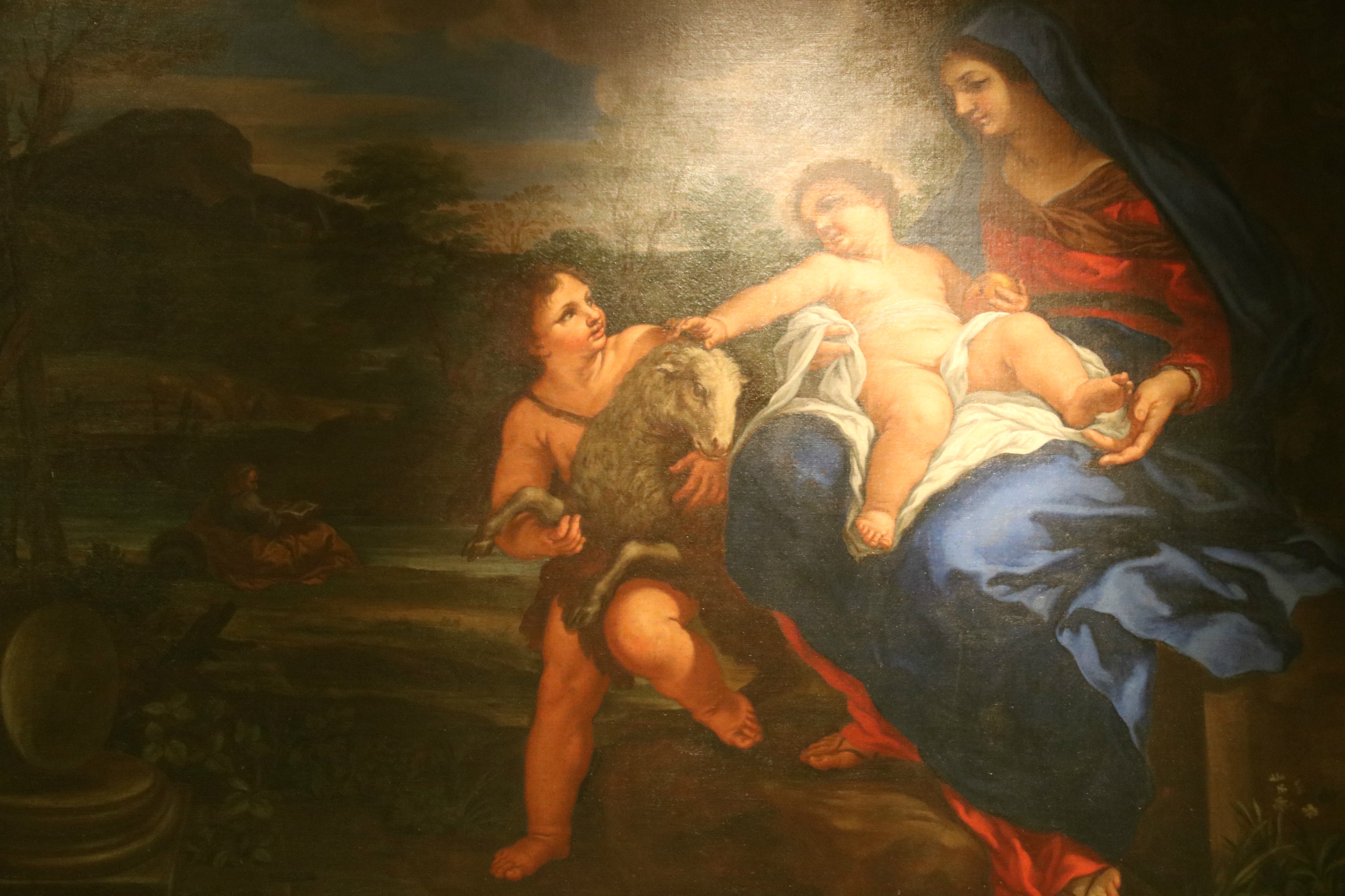
Holy Family with Saint John

Carlo Lamparelli was an Italian painter, active as a portrait and historical painter, who flourished about 1680. He was born in the town of Spello. He was a pupil of Giacinto Brandi.
