= Giacinto Brandi =

Italian painter (1621–1691)

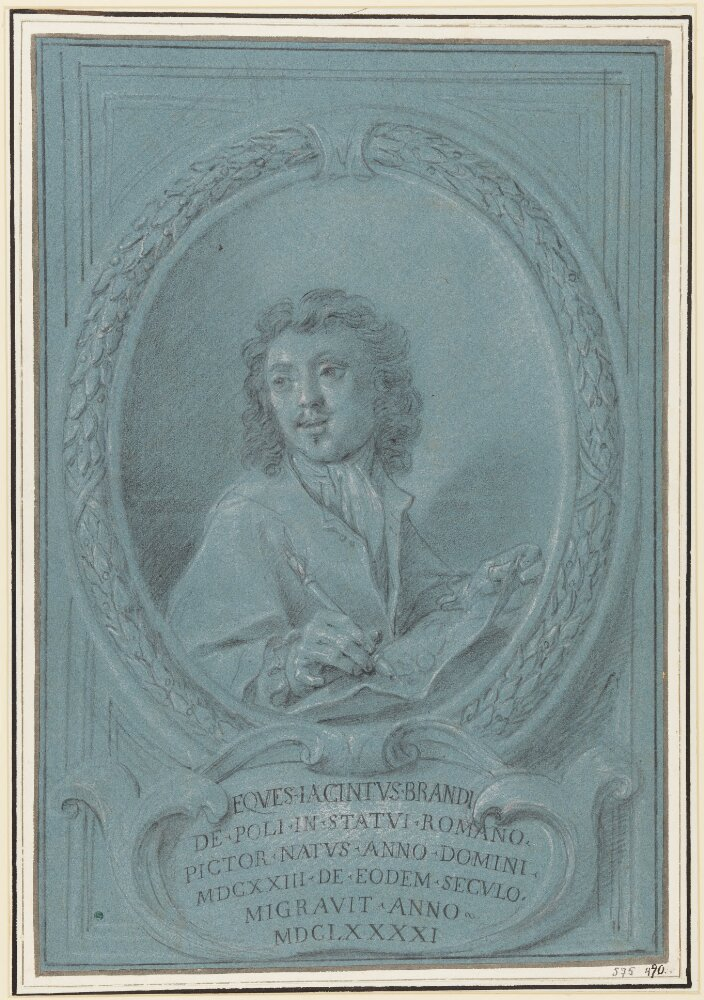
- Portrait of Giacinto Brandi, drawing by Luigi Garzi, Nationalmuseum, Stockholm
- Born: 1621; Poli, Lazio, Papal States
- Died: 19 January 1691 (aged 69–70); Rome, Papal States
- Known for: Painting
- Movement: Baroque

Giacinto Brandi (1621 – 19 January 1691) was an Italian Baroque painter, active mainly in Rome and Naples.

== Biography ==
=== Early life and education ===
Born in Rome, he was part of the studio of Alessandro Algardi, a noted sculptor who noted that Brandi was more suited to painting. He joined the studio of Giovanni Giacomo Sementi. He travelled to Naples from 1638 and by 1647 had returned to Rome to work under Giovanni Lanfranco, where Brandi befriended Mattia Preti. The two artists would later on, often collaborate. Brandi’s Joseph’s Dream (Rome, Galleria Corsini) is based on one of Lanfranco’s works.

=== Career ===
In 1647, Brandi joined the Pontifical Academy of Fine Arts and Letters of the Virtuosi al Pantheon in Rome and from 1651 was present at the meetings of the Accademia di San Luca. Shortly after 1650, Brandi executed canvases with scenes from the Life of the Virgin for the ceiling of Santa Maria in Via Lata, Rome, which were much admired. Only one, the Coronation of the Virgin, survives. In 1653, he completed frescoes of mythological scenes in the Palazzo Pamphilj in Piazza Navona, Rome. By 1657, he was considered one of the most promising painters in the city.

Between 1655 and 1660, Brandi came under the influence of Mattia Preti, and his Lot and his Daughters (Rome, Galleria Corsini), for example, is a fusion of Preti’s naturalism and Guercino’s eloquent light effect. During these years Brandi also decorated the chapel of San Giuseppe in the church of Gesù e Maria, Rome; his central canvas of St. Joseph in Glory dramatically contrasts the sweeping draperies derived from Lanfranco with the saint’s head depicted against the light. This work was followed by the Forty Martyrs (Rome, Santissime Stimmate di San Francesco), in which the modelling of the nudes is softened by a dense atmospheric chiaroscuro.

Probably in 1661, Brandi went to Gaeta, where he executed decorative frescoes and a canvas of the Martyrdom of St. Erasmus in the crypt of the cathedral (1666). In these works his personal style emerged in thick and substantial brushwork, reinforced with a lively play of light that gave the forms an almost sculptural quality. His St. Roch (early 1660s; Rome, San Rocco), commissioned by Cardinal Francesco Barberini, also shows that he had been influenced by the broad and fluent handling of Guercino’s early work. This manner so impressed Preti that in 1665, writing to the Sicilian collector Antonio Ruffo, he praised Brandi over Pier Francesco Mola, Ciro Ferri and Carlo Maratta.

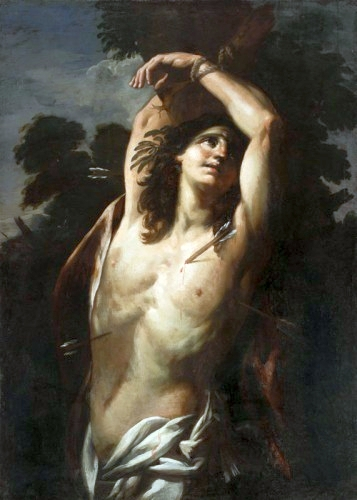
St. Sebastian, Florence, Fondazione Longhi

Brandi’s St. Sebastian (Florence, Fondazione Longhi) and a St. Gregory in Ecstasy (Monte Porzio Catone, San Gregorio Magno) were painted c. 1666. In 1668, following the resignation of Pietro da Cortona, Brandi was nominated Principe of the Accademia di San Luca. The following year he completed the St. Charles Borromeo Administering the Sacrament to the Plague-stricken (Milan, Santa Maria della Vittoria).

Between 1666 and 1671 he sent canvases, mainly of saints, to the church of the Ospedale di Santa Maria delle Grazie at Zaragoza and to the church of the convent of the Capuchins at Toledo and painted an altarpiece of the Annunciation (Rome, Santa Maria Annunziata in Borgo). In 1671, he was commissioned by Cardinal Luigi Omodei to fresco the dome and lantern of Sant'Ambrogio e Carlo al Corso. Subsequently, he added the Prophets on the pendentives of the dome, in a style clearly influenced by Maratta, and frescoes, glorifying St. Charles Borromeo, on the vaults of the transept, presbytery and semi-dome of the apse, completed in 1677. In the same year, Omodei commissioned him to fresco the central vault of the nave with the Fall of the Rebel Angels. This vast programme of decoration showed a marked stylistic change, with a renewed interest in linear effects.

Brandi’s canvases of the same period, such as the Martyrdom of St. Blaise (Rome, San Carlo ai Catinari), indicate a parallel development from his earlier dramatically lit and highly coloured work to a tightly controlled classicising manner. For Monsignor Giorgio Bolognetti, Brandi painted an altarpiece of the Guardian Angel (Rome, Santi Angeli Custodi), as well as fresco decorations and an altarpiece of the Coronation of the Virgin (1678–80; Rome, Gesù e Maria).

On Maratta’s recommendation, Brandi was invited in 1680 to paint ceiling frescoes (completed 1686) in San Silvestro in Capite, Rome. There he depicted the Assumption of the Virgin with St. Sylvester, returning to Lanfranco’s monumental and dramatic manner in order to compete with Giovanni Battista Gaulli’s brilliantly dynamic frescoes (1672–9) in the Church of the Gesù.

=== Late work ===
In Brandi’s late work, such as the Martyrdom of St. Andrew (1685; Rome, Santa Maria in Via Lata) and the Holy Trinity (Rome, Santa Francesca Romana), the rigour of the design beneath the dynamic contrast of light and shade became more pronounced and even more controlled. Giacinto Brandi died in Rome on 19 January 1691. Among his pupils were Carlo Lamparelli of Spello, and Alessandro Vassello.

== Gallery ==
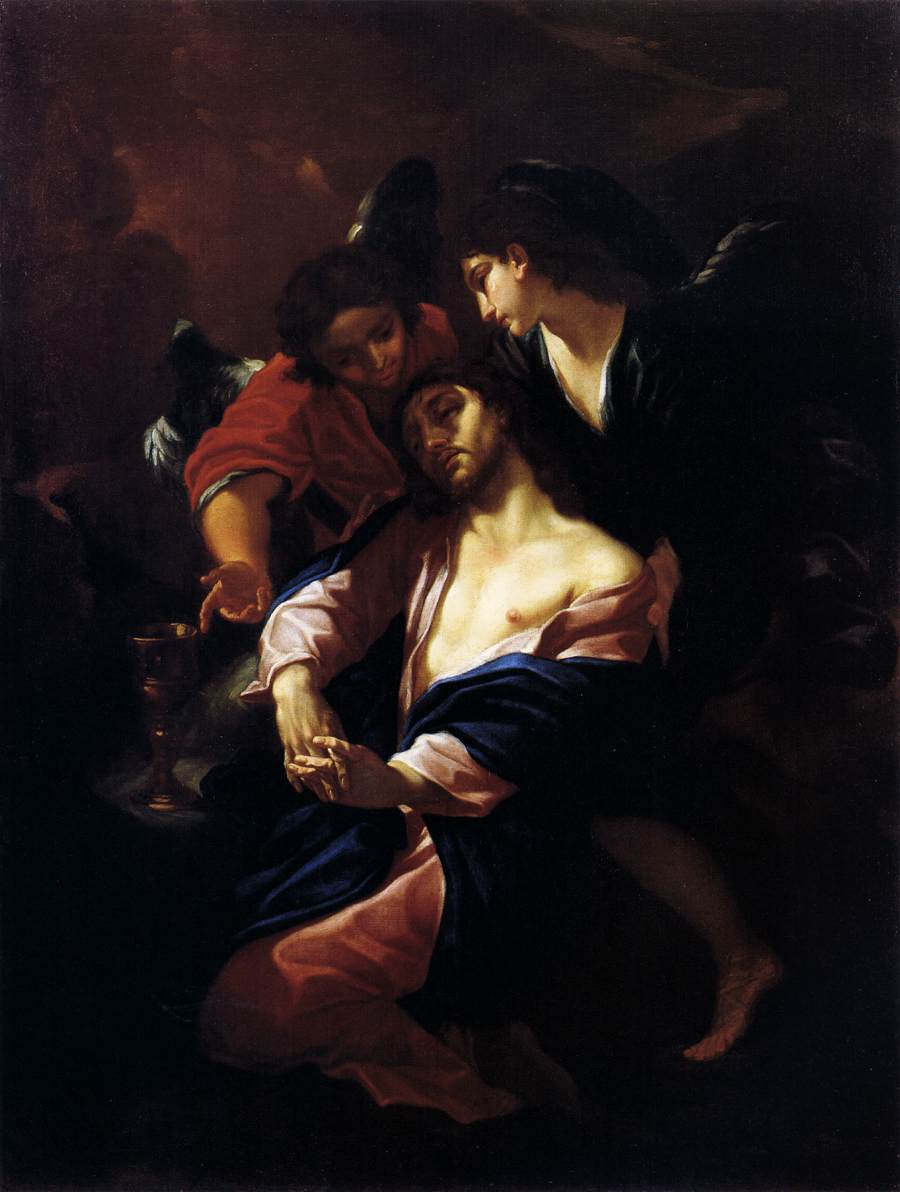
Christ in Getsemani, Pinacoteca Vaticana

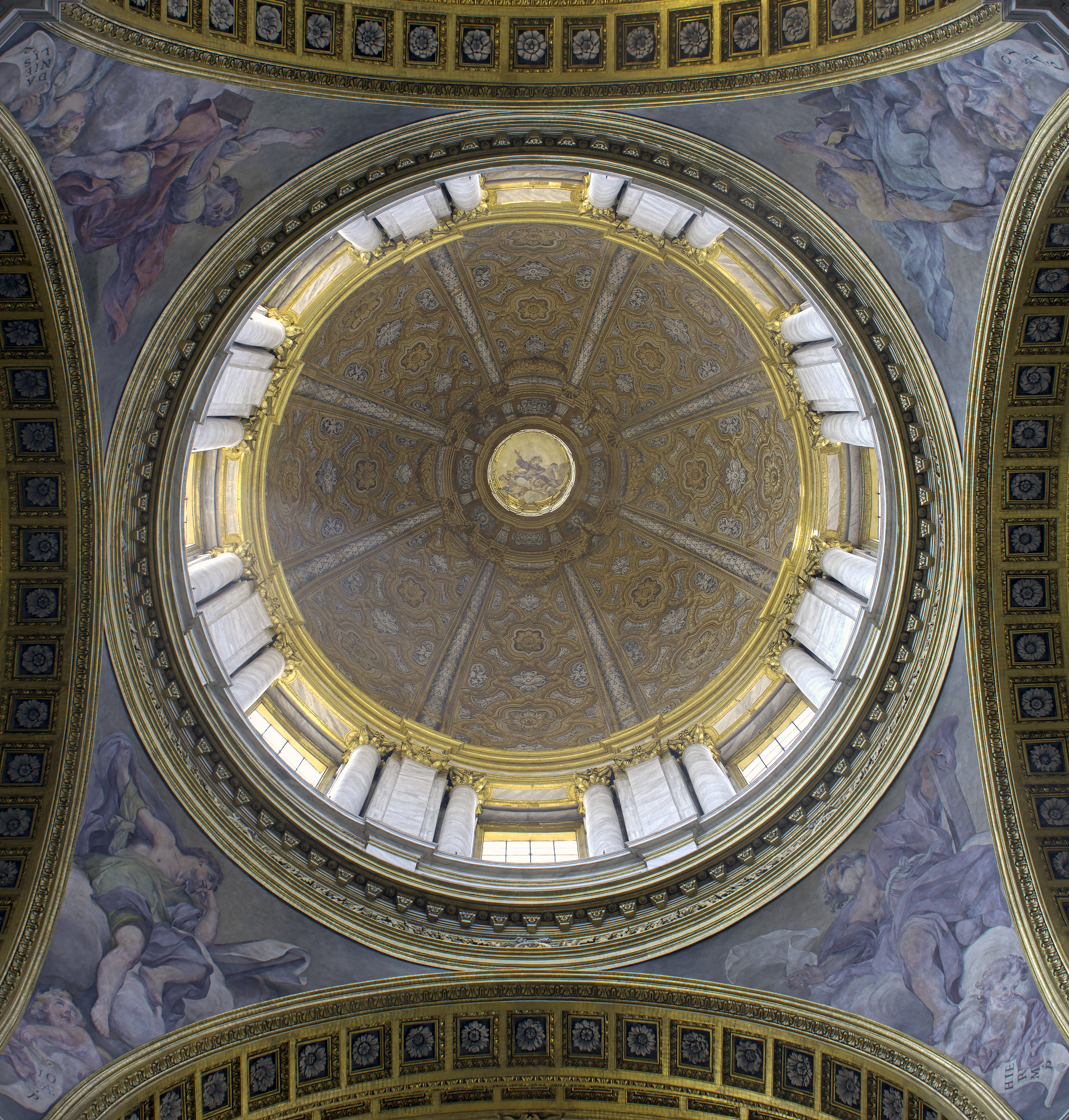
Dome of the Church of San Carlo al Corso

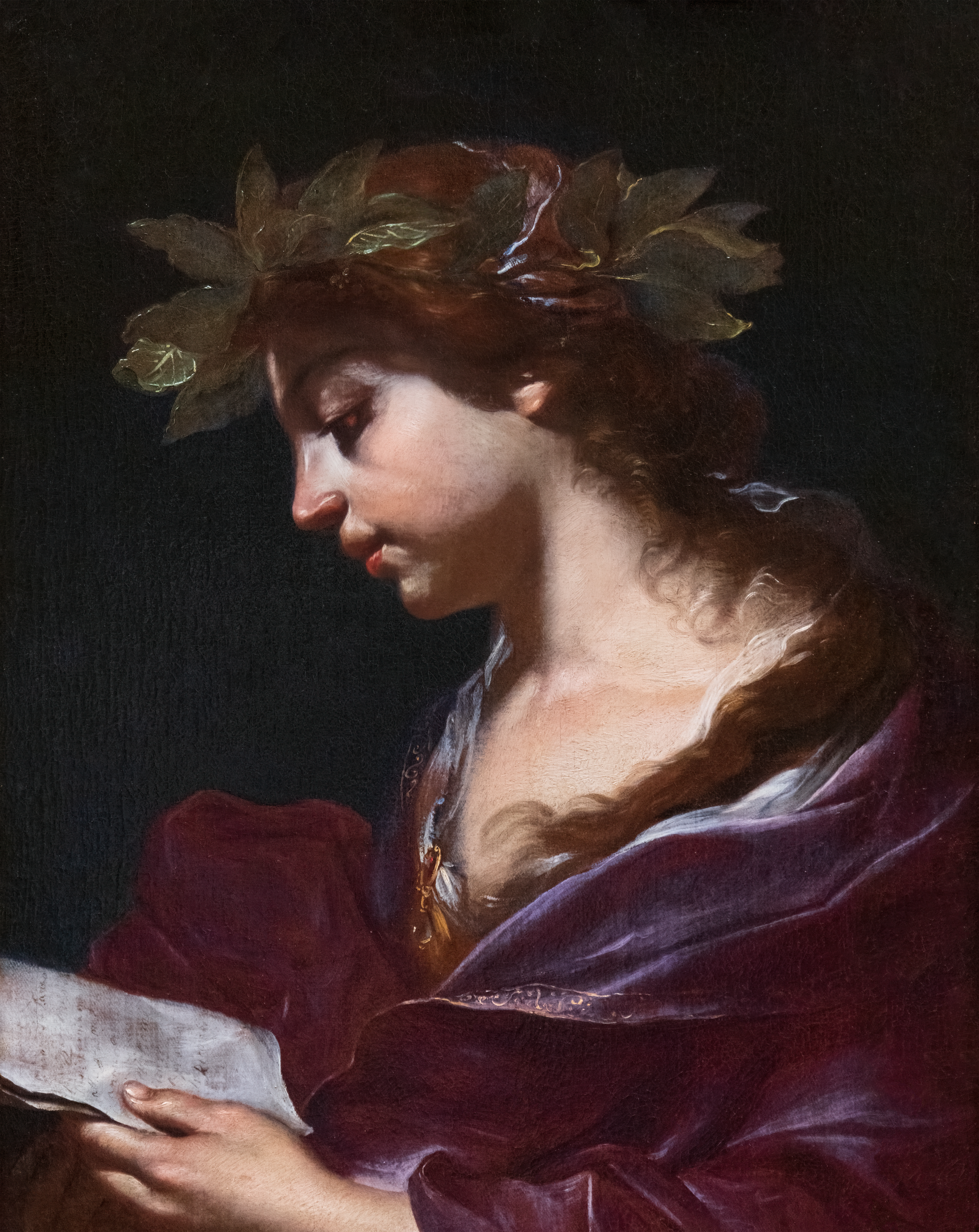
Poetry, Musée des Beaux-Arts de Narbonne

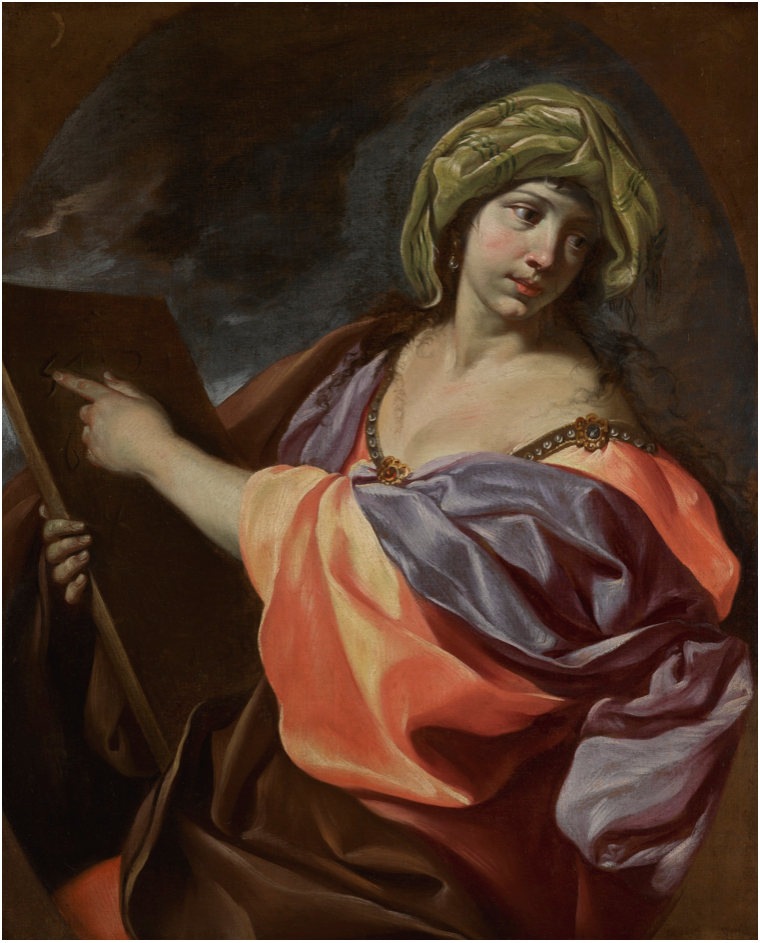
Allegory of Mathematics, priv. col.

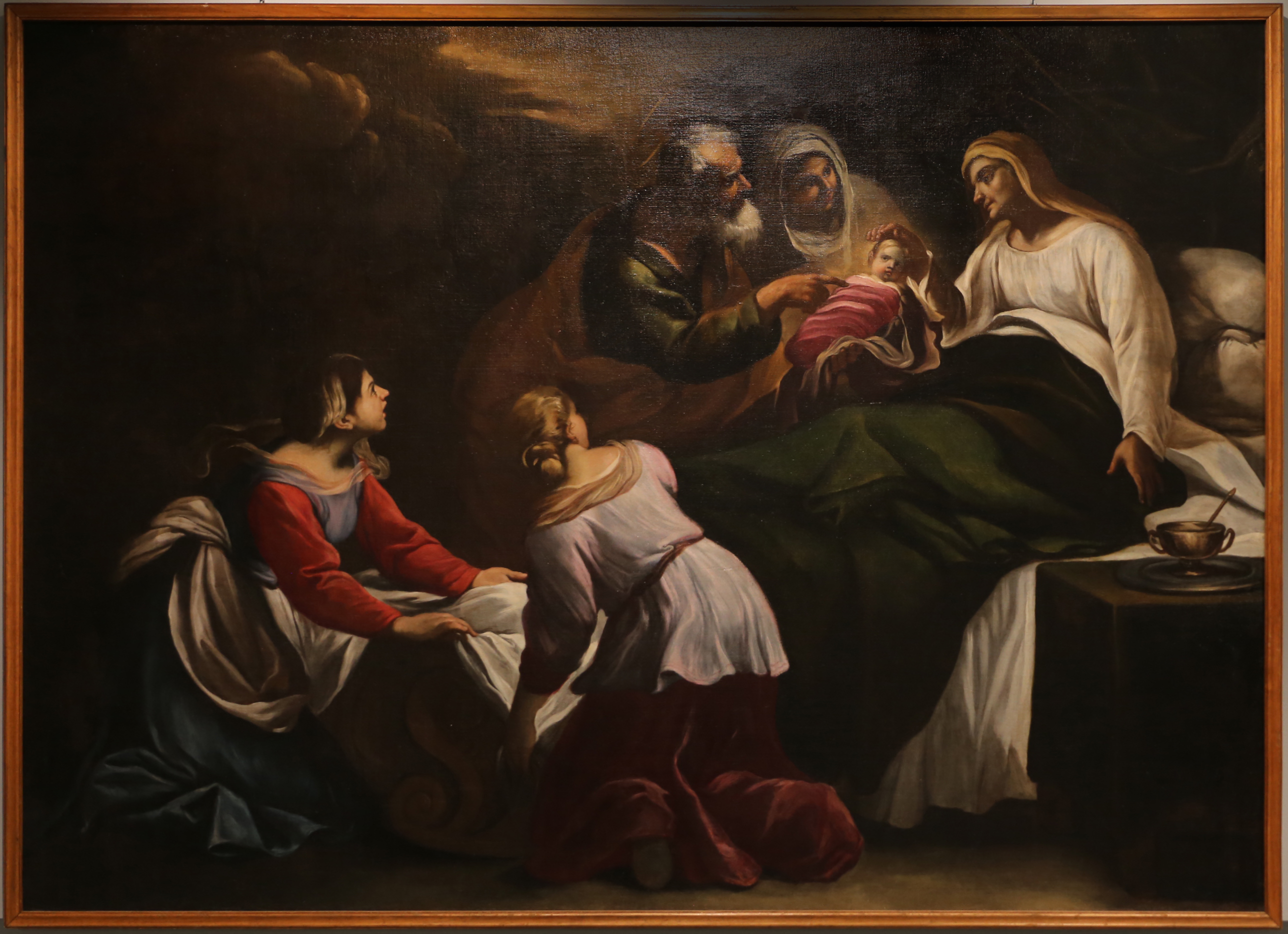
The Birth of the Virgin, Museo Nazionale d'Abruzzo, L'Aquila

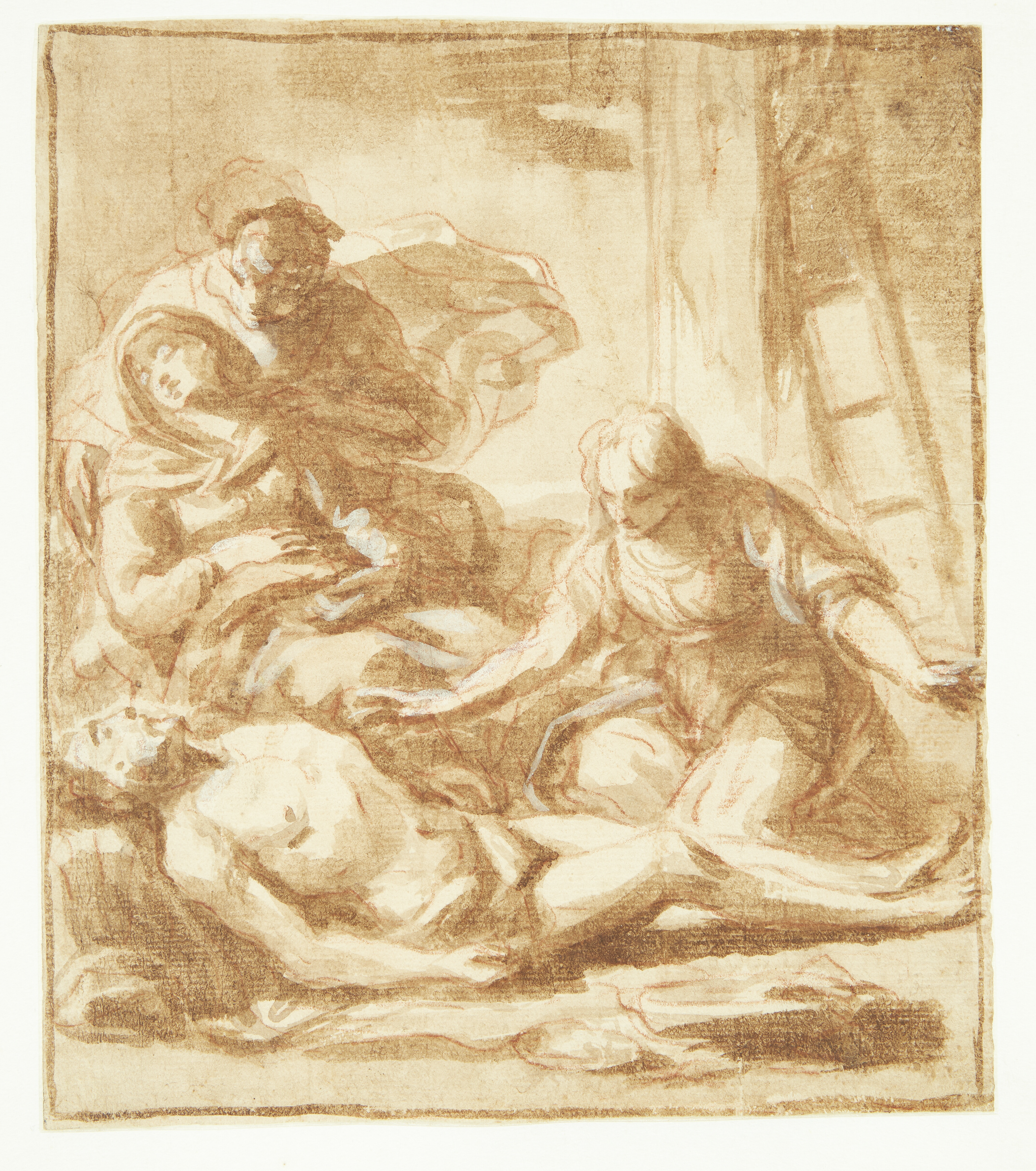
Lamentation of Christ, National Gallery of Denmark, Copenhagen

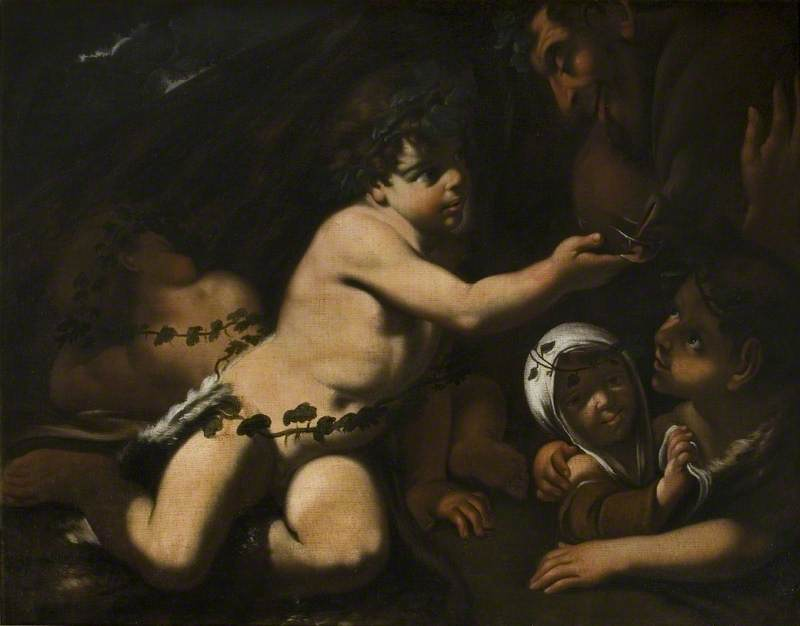
Bacchus, Lamport Hall, Lamport, Northamptonshire

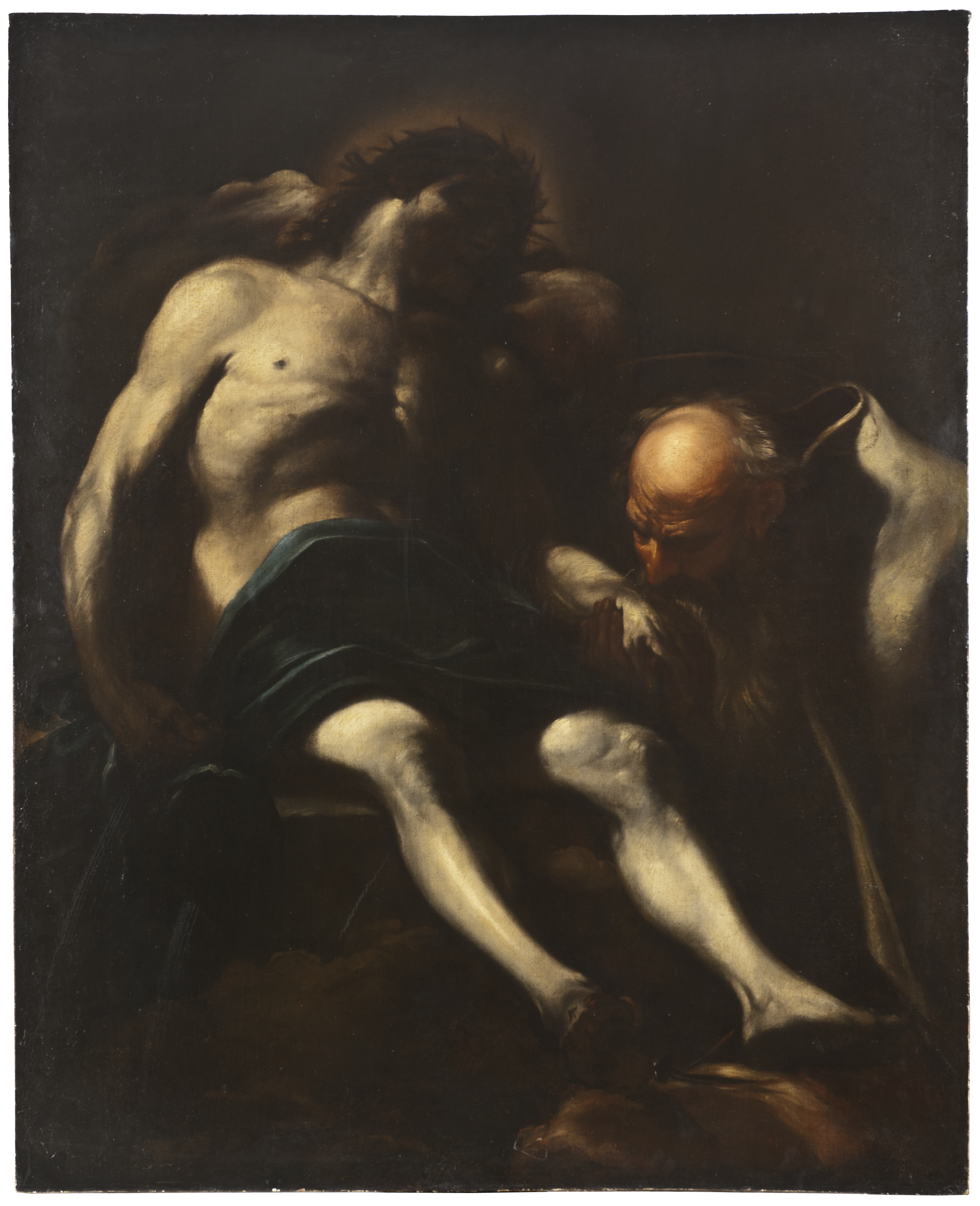
Christ buried by Joseph of Arimathea, Nationalmuseum, Stockholm

== Bibliography ==
- Scannelli, Francesco (1657). Il Microcosmo della Pittura. Cesena: Neri. p. 208.
- Titi, Filippo (1674). Studio di pittura, scoltora et architettura nelle chiese di Roma. Rome: Mancini. p. 350.
- Orlandi, Pellegrino Antonio (1719). Abecedario pittorico. Naples.
- Bertini Calosso, Achille (1930). "BRANDI, Giacinto". Enciclopedia Italiana. Rome: Istituto dell'Enciclopedia Italiana.
- Serafinelli, Guendalina (2015). Giacinto Brandi (1621-1691). Turin: Allemandi. ISBN 978-8842223535.
- "BRANDI, Giacinto". Web Gallery of Art.
