= Santissime Stimmate di San Francesco =

- Holy Stigmata of St Francis of Assisi (in English)
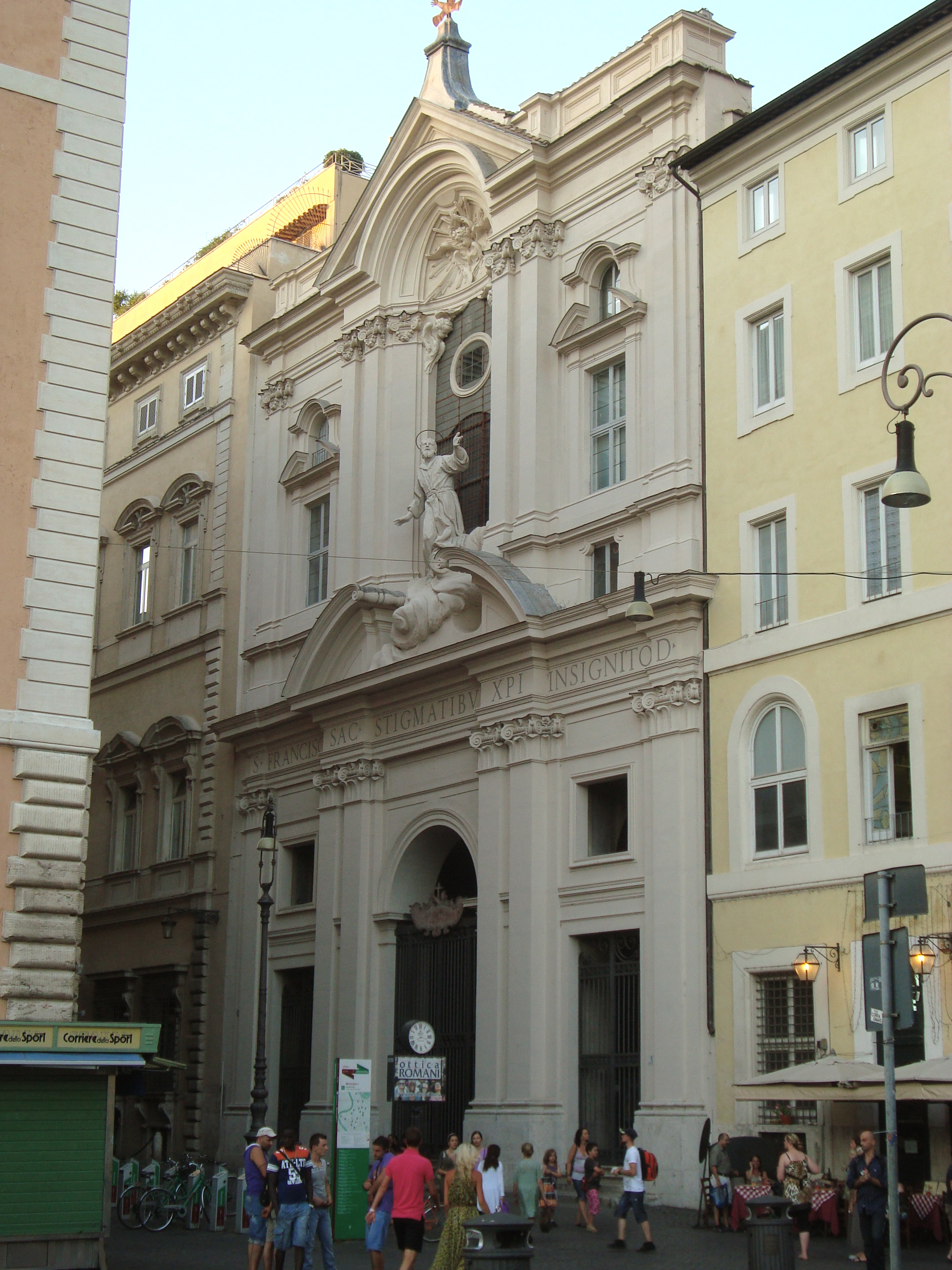
- Façade on via dei Cestari, seen from Largo di Torre Argentina.
- Click on the map for a fullscreen view
- 41°53′47″N 12°28′40″E
- Location: Rome
- Country: Italy
- Denomination: Roman Catholic

Architecture
- Architect: Giovanni Battista Contini
- Architectural type: Church
- Style: Baroque/Rococo
- Groundbreaking: 1297
- Completed: 1714

Administration
- Province: Lazio

The Ss. Stimmate di San Francesco ("Church of the Holy Stigmata of St. Francis") is a church in central Rome, Italy, in the Rione Pigna, sited where previously there was a church called Ss. Quaranta Martiri de Calcarario. It is located on Via dei Cestari, near the corner with Corso Vittorio Emanuele II and across the street and diagonal from the Largo di Torre Argentina.

The first church in this location was consecrated in 1297. In 1597, the land was given by Pope Clement VIII to the Confraternita delle Ss.Stimmate; the construction of a new building was completed in 1714, from designs by Giovanni Battista Contini. Among the people buried in the church is the famous eighteenth-century painter Jacopo Zoboli, a member of the Confraternity from 1718 until his death.

== Art and architecture ==
During the papacy of Clement XI, the facade was begun by Antonio Canevari, in a plan recalling Pietro da Cortona's style. In the center niche formed by the interrupted tympanum is a statue of St. Francis receiving the stigmata as he looks heavenward.

The first chapel to the right has a Flagellation by Marco Benefial, flanking paintings by Domenico Muratori with a cupola frescoed by Giovanni Odazzi. The second chapel has a painting of the Virgin by Sebastiano Conca and a St Michael, a copy of the mosaic of St. Peters completed by Filippo Laurenti. The third chapel on the right has a canvas depicting St. Joseph Calasanzio by Marco Caprini.

The main altarpiece is a Saint Francis with stigmata (1719) by Francesco Trevisani. The nave ceiling has a Glory of St. Francis by Luigi Garzi.

In the third chapel the left has an altarpiece depicting the Ss. Quaranta Martiri (Holy Forty martyrs) by Giacinto Brandi, author of another St. Francis with Stigmata in the Hall of Stimmate. The sacristy ceiling was frescoed by Girolamo Pesce.

== Sources ==
- Rendina, C. (2000). Le Chiese di Roma. Rome: Newton & Compton Editori. pp. 353–354.

== See also ==
- Pietro da Cortona
- Giacinto Brandi
- Francesco Trevisani
- Jacopo Zoboli
