= Joseph Heintz the Younger =

German painter

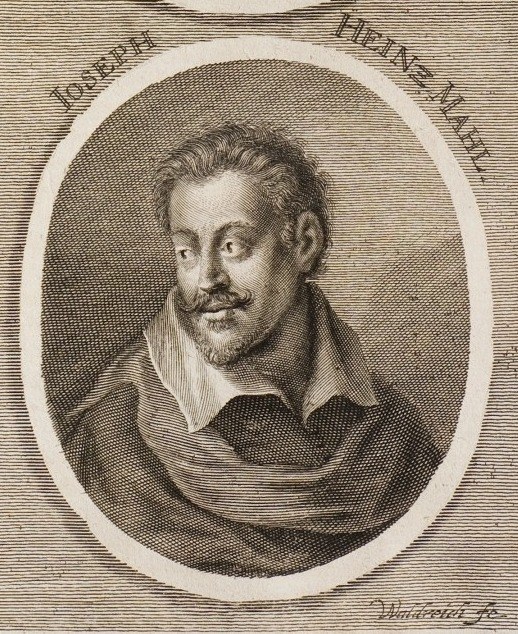
- Portrait of Joseph Heintz by Sandrart
- Born: 1600; Augsburg, Holy Roman Empire
- Died: 24 September 1678 (aged 77–78); Venice, Republic of Venice
- Education: Matthäus Gundelach
- Known for: Painting
- Movement: Baroque

Joseph Heintz the Younger or Joseph Heintz (II) (1600 – 24 September 1678) was a German Baroque painter. In 1625 he travelled to Italy, where he settled in Venice and became known for his copies of his father's work and his religious or mythological paintings.

== Biography ==
He was born in Augsburg as the son of Joseph Heintz the Elder. He served his apprenticeship (1617–1621) as a painter with his stepfather, Matthäus Gundelach, in Augsburg. His artistic beginnings are traceable in drawings produced in Augsburg (e.g. the Painter at his Easel, 1621; National Museum, Gdańsk), and Venice (e.g. Genius of Painting, 1625; Vienna, Albertina). His great panel painting Christ in Limbo (late 1620s or early 1630s) bears witness to his conversion to Catholicism, without which he could hardly have established himself in Venice. He probably spent long periods in Rome in the 1630s or 1640s, and before 1644 Pope Urban VIII made him a Knight of the Order of the Golden Spur. Many of his paintings on religious themes, including works supporting the Counter-Reformation, were predominantly for churches in Venice and its dominions.

However, his special importance for Venetian painting lies not in the field of religious art but in his depictions (mostly Venice, Biblioteca Correr) of the city’s festivities and state ceremonies, featuring large numbers of figures, in which he was a direct precursor of Luca Carlevarijs and Canaletto, as revealed especially in his Piazza Sanj Marco (after 1640; Rome, Galleria Doria Pamphilj). Presumably he knew of the similar endeavours of his cousin Joseph Plepp (1595–1642) in Bern. He also produced genre paintings, such as the Fishmonger (1650s; priv. col.); votive pictures, including the Adoration of the Magi (? 1669) and Sacra conversazione (1669; both Breguzzo, Sant'Andrea); allegories, for example the Allegory of Venice (1674; Vienna, Kunsthistorisches Museum); and pictures showing the activities of the months and mythological scenes of which there is so far only a literary record.

Heintz’s oeuvre was regarded as extraordinary and bizarre by his contemporaries, his profane pictures being peopled not only with a multitude of small figures in sometimes grotesque attitudes, as might be demanded by the depiction of festivities, but including, in the allegories in particular, fabulous hybrid creatures or monsters drawn from the repertory of Hieronymus Bosch and his successors or partly invented by himself, as in the Allegory of Venice (Vienna, Kunsthistorisches Museum) and Vanitas (Milan, Pinacoteca di Brera). Even in old age (1674) he quoted from the works of his father. He also worked on occasion as an etcher; for example his painting Loreto (1650; Italy, priv. col.) is accompanied by an etching in two states by his hand (Hamburg, Hamburger Kunsthalle). Marco Boschini praised the style of his old age for its naturalness, bravura, and vivacity. In his early seventies he taught Francesco Trevisani in his workshop in the Sestiere San Polo. He died in Venice on 24 September 1678.

== Gallery ==
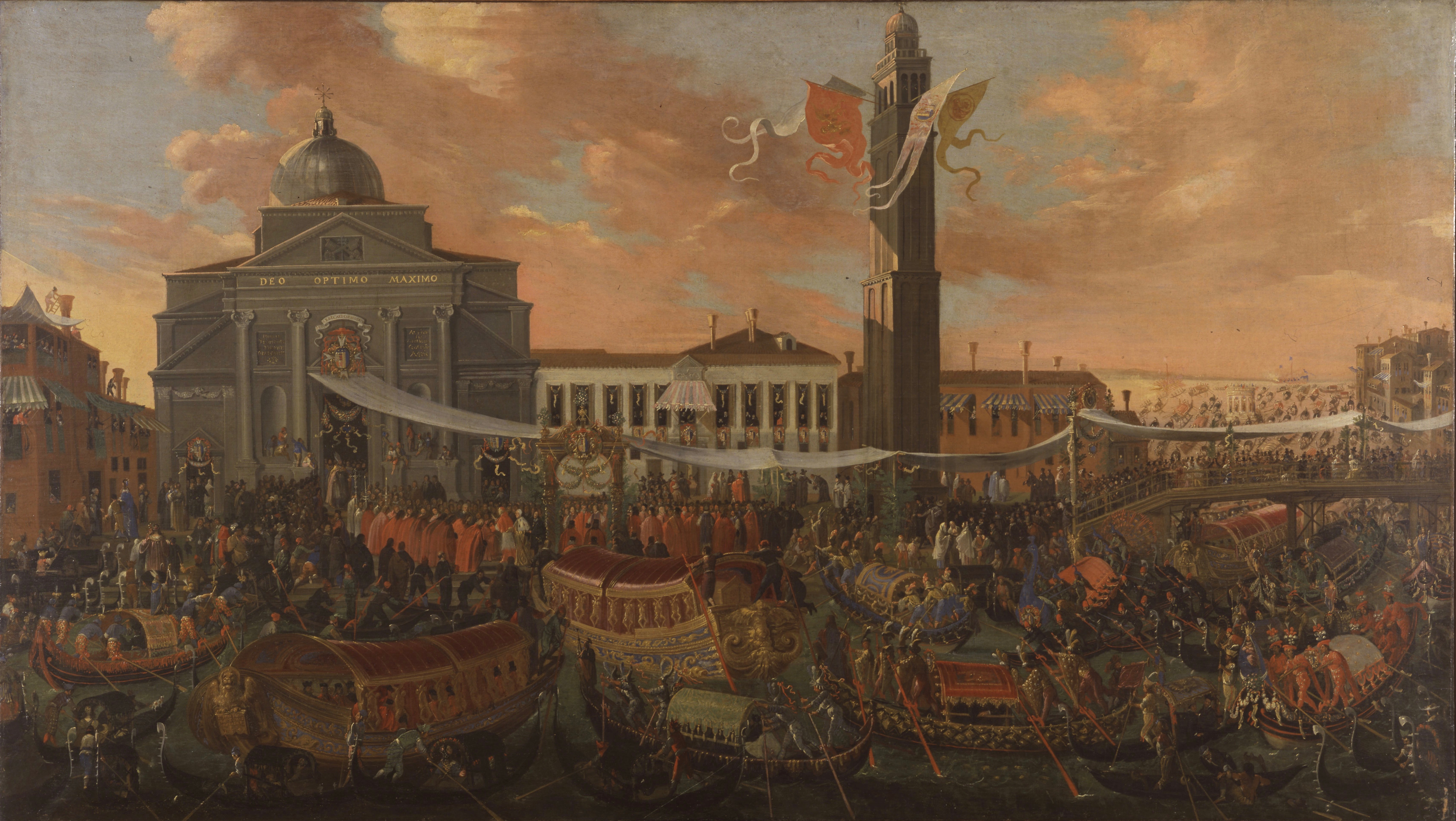
Entry of Patriarch Federico Corner into San Pietro di Castello, c. 1631

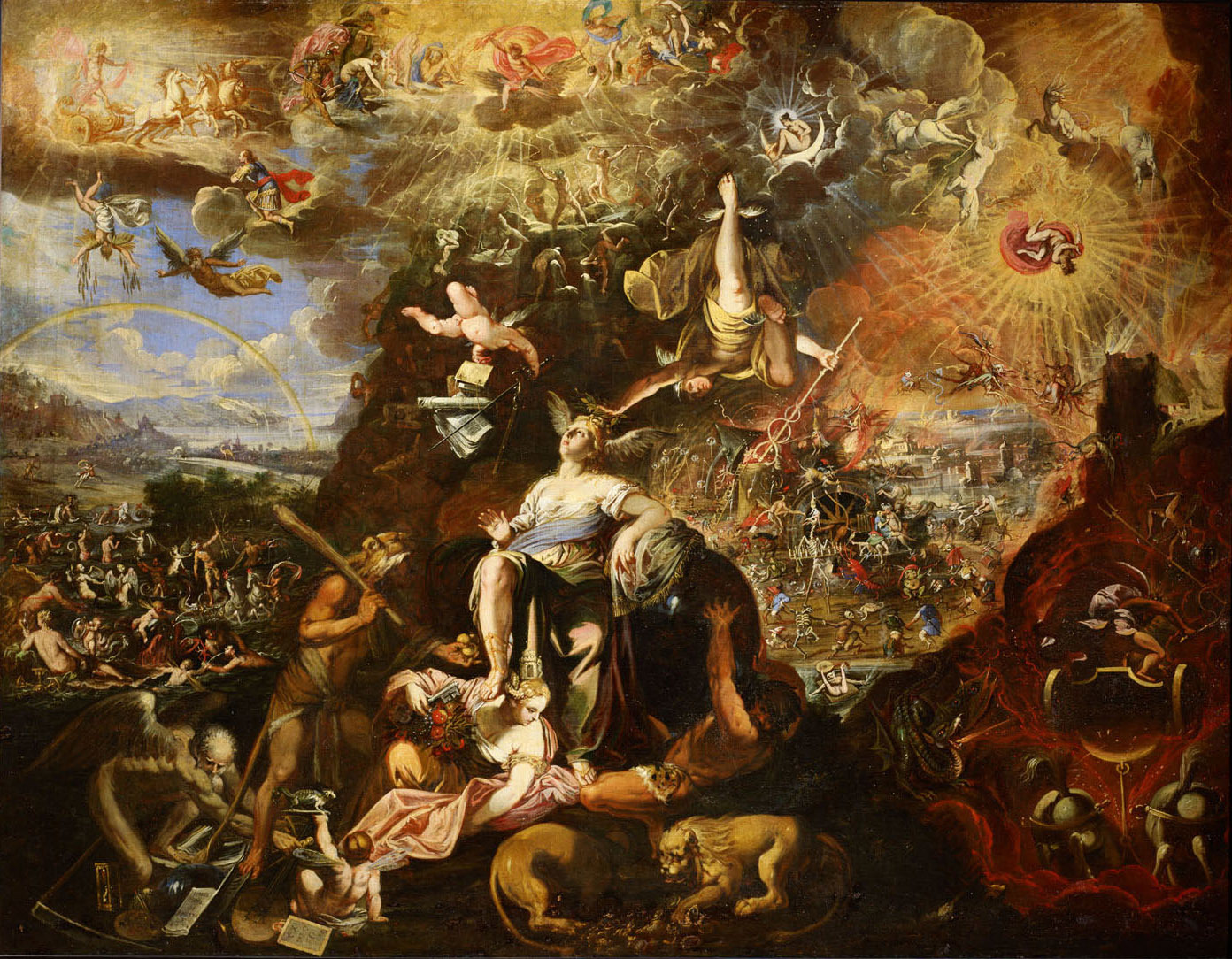
Allegory, 1674

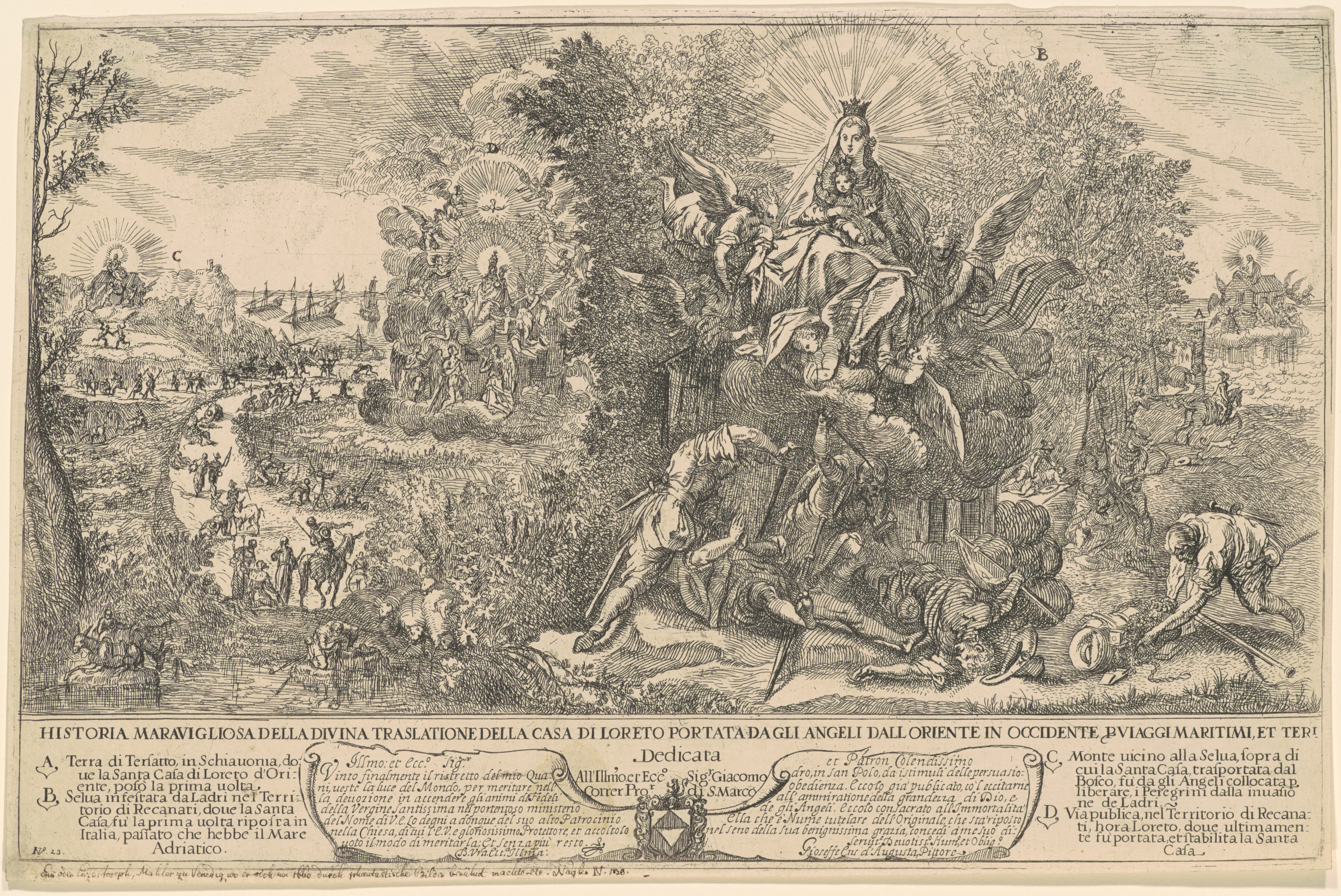
The Transport of the Holy House of Loreto, c. 1650

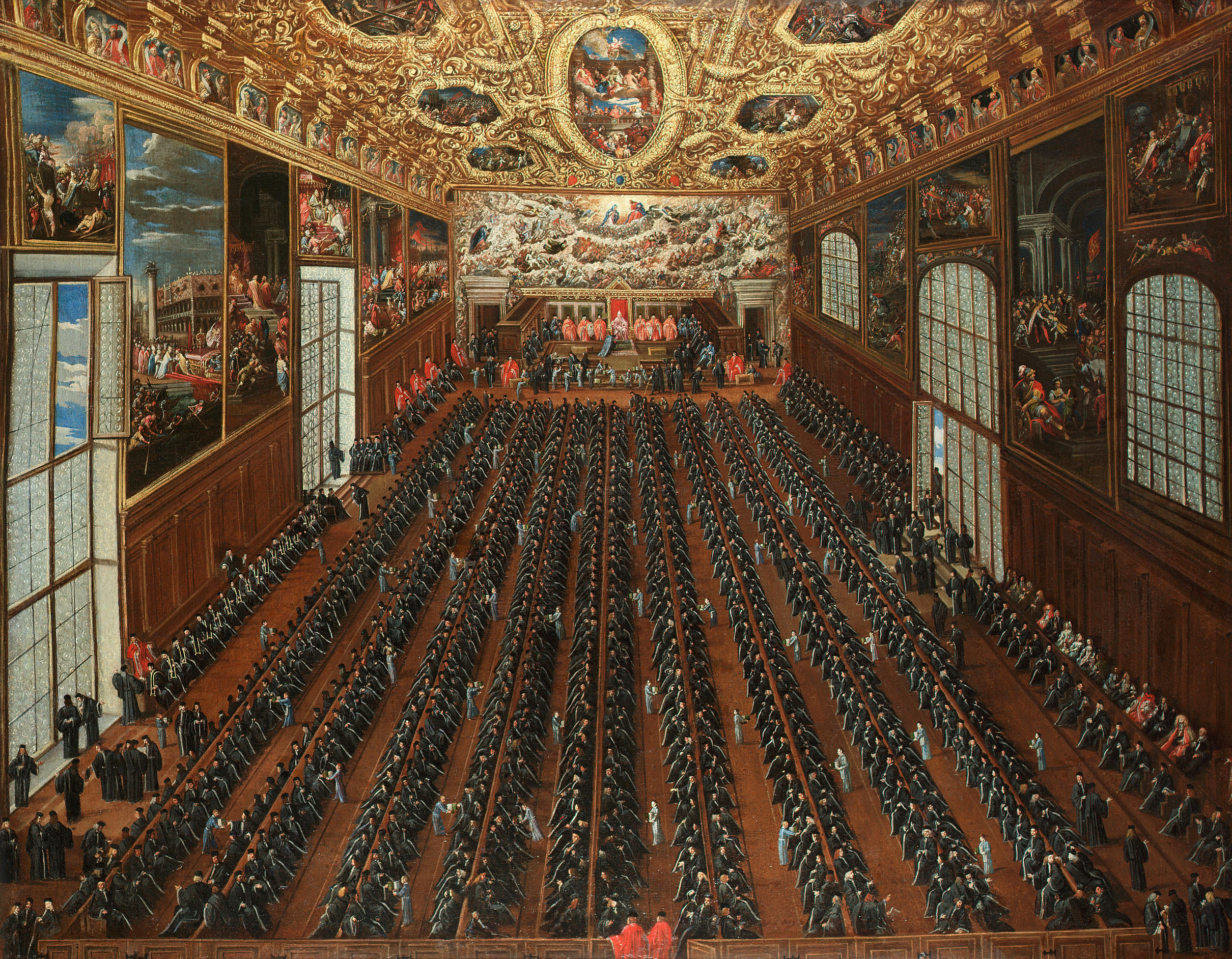
Interior of Doge's Palace, Venice, with patricians voting on a bulletin for the election of new magistrates, c. 1648–50

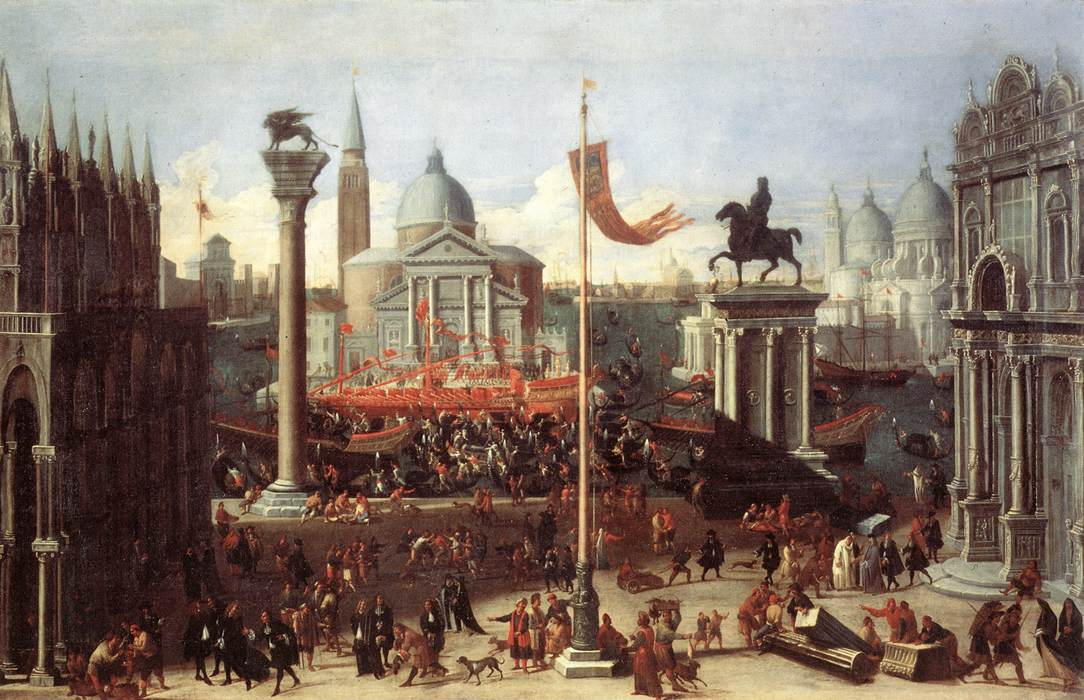
Imaginary Scene with Venetian Buildings, c. 1670–75

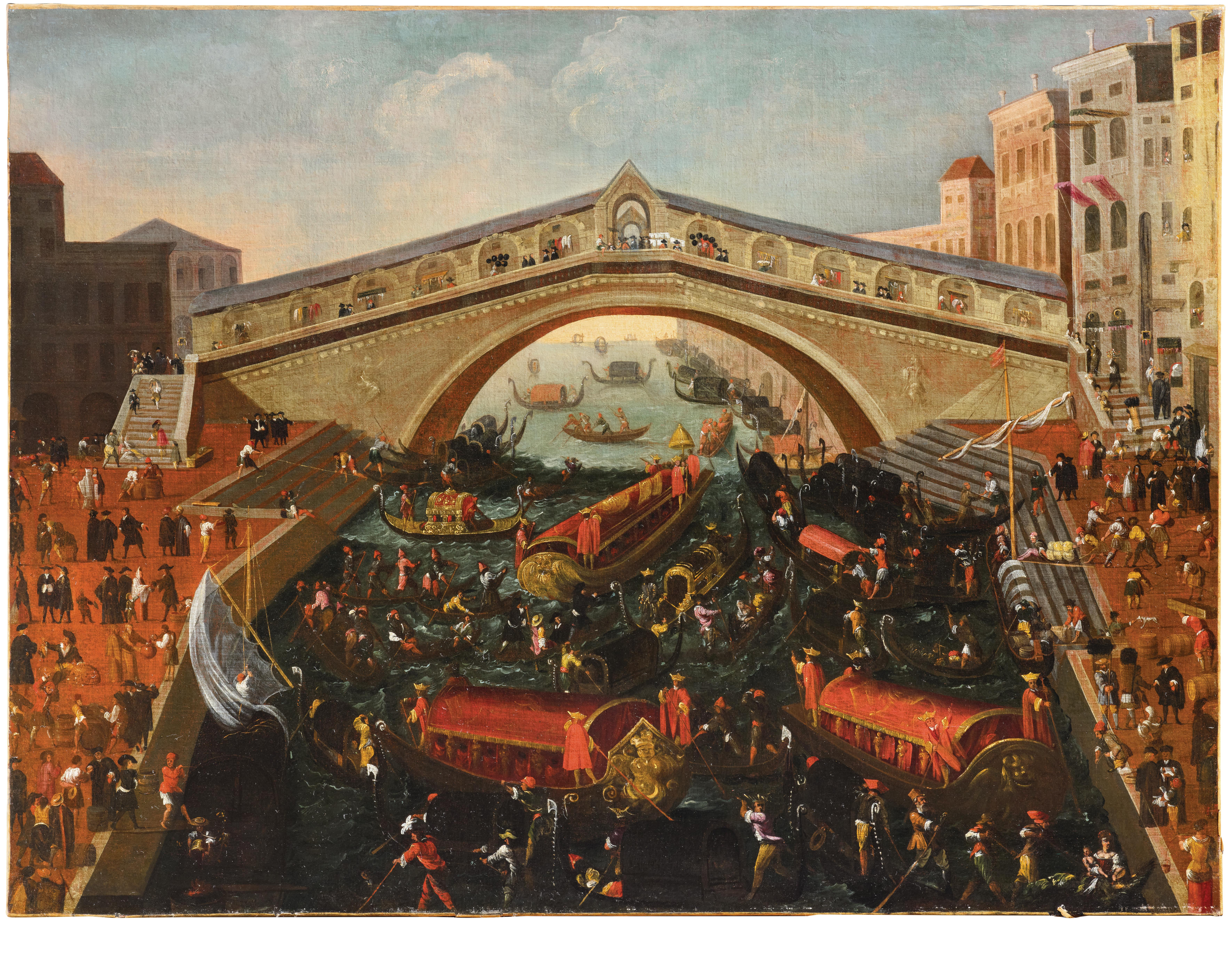
The Rialto Bridge with a Doge's procession c. 1600

== Bibliography ==
- Boschini, Marco (1966) [1660]. A. Pallucchini (ed.). La carta del navegar pitoresco. Venice/Rome: Istituto per la collaborazione culturale. pp. XXVII, LXVII–LXIX, 83–4, 547, 572–3, 591, 594, 600, 607, 628.
- Frimmel, Theodor von (1922). "Bemerkungen über den jüngeren Joseph Heintz". Neue Blätter für Gemäldekunde. 1: 203–14.
- Kalista, Zdeněk (1928–30). "Humprecht Jan Černín jako mecenáš a podporovatel výtvarných umění v době své benátské ambasady (1660–1663)" [Humprecht Jan Černín as patron and supporter of the arts during his Venetian legation (1660–1663)]. Památky archeologické. 36: 53–78.
