= Joseph Heintz the Elder =

Swiss painter (1564–1609)

Joseph Heintz
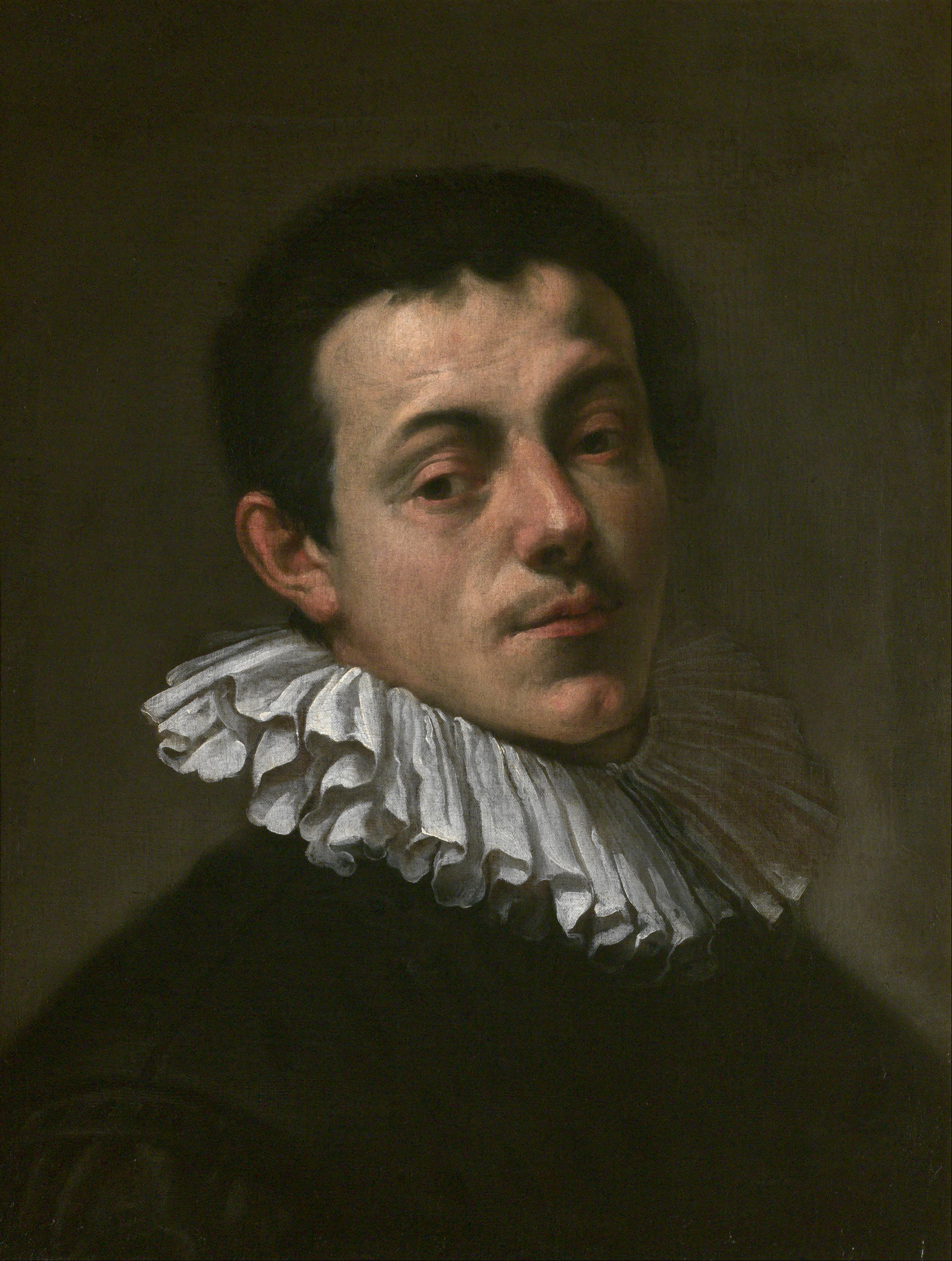
- Portrait by Hans von Aachen, 1585
- Born: 11 June 1564; Basel, Holy Roman Empire
- Died: 15 October 1609 (aged 45); Prague, Kingdom of Bohemia
- Known for: Painting
- Movement: Late Renaissance

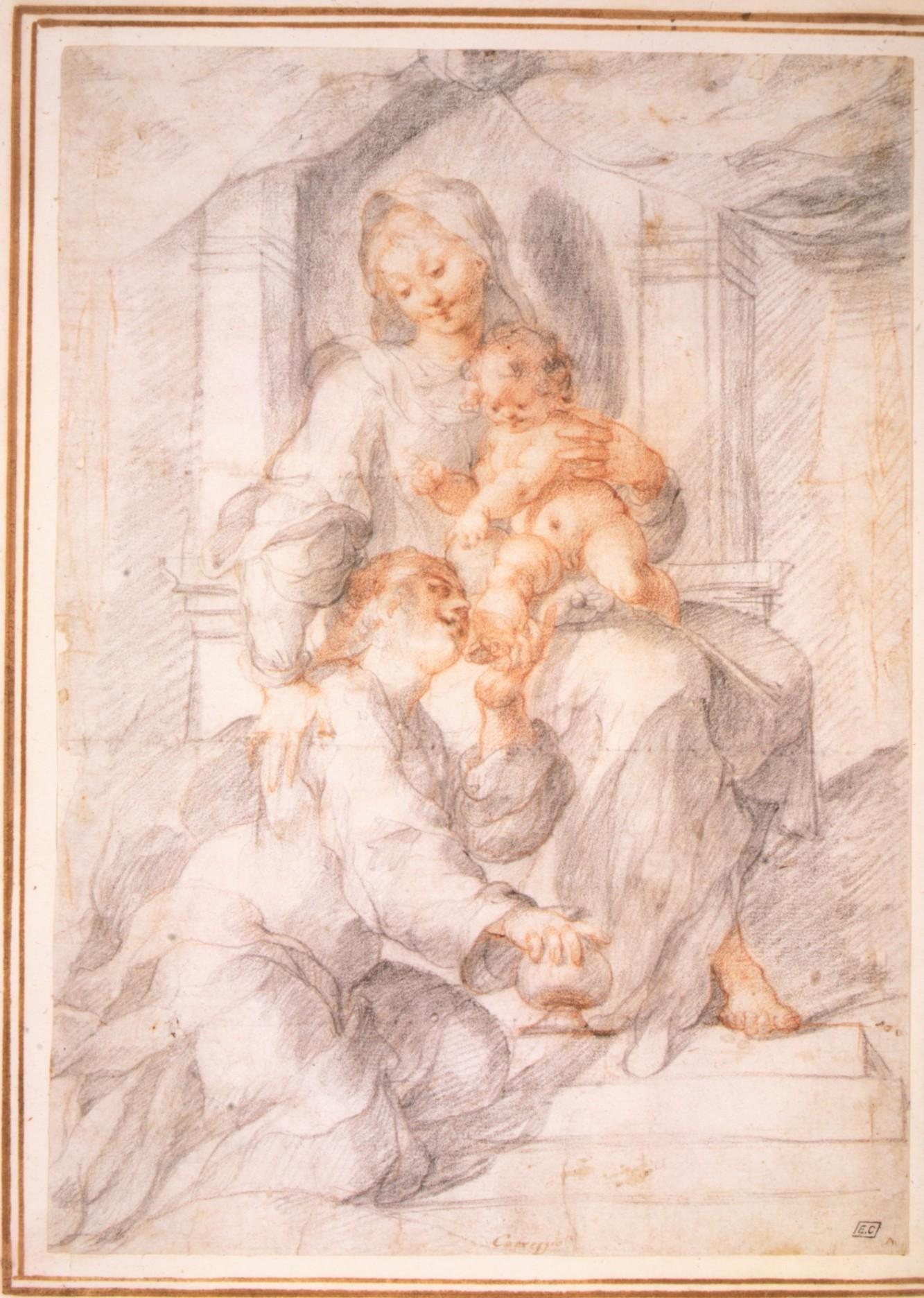
Madonna and Child with Mary Magdalen

Joseph Heintz (or Heinz) the Elder (11 June 1564 – 15 October 1609) was a Swiss painter, draftsman and architect.

== Biography ==
Heintz was born in Basel, Switzerland. He appears to have been a pupil of Hans Bock, and to have educated himself by diligent practice in copying the works of Hans Holbein the younger. Between 1585 and 1587 he lived in Rome, registering himself a pupil to Hans von Aachen. He next settled in Bohemia in 1591, and was at once appointed court painter to Rudolf II, but he remained in Prague for two years only, as in 1593 he was commissioned to make some copies from the antique for the emperor, and for that purpose went to Rome, where he spent some years. In 1604 he was active in Augsburg, and from the time little is known of his history until his death in a village near Prague. He was buried at the graveyard of the church of St John the Baptist in the Lesser Town of Prague.

Heintz's paintings included religious images, portraits, and, following the emperor's taste, erotic mythological themes. They were at one time in high demand, but later suffered an eclipse. Among them are a family portrait in Bern and that of Rudolf II in Vienna. He was constantly investigating subtle questions of light, and almost all of his landscapes show the interest he took in this technical matter. A notable work by him is the Rape of Proserpine, which hangs in the Dresden Gallery, and was engraved by Lukas Kilian; in the same gallery are two other works, Lot and His Daughters and Ecce Homo. Finally there is his portrait of Constance of Austria. He had a son Joseph, who signed with the same name, and who painted a few religious pictures; several of these works hitherto attributed to the son are now believed to be late productions by the father.
