= Santa Barbara dei Librai, Rome =

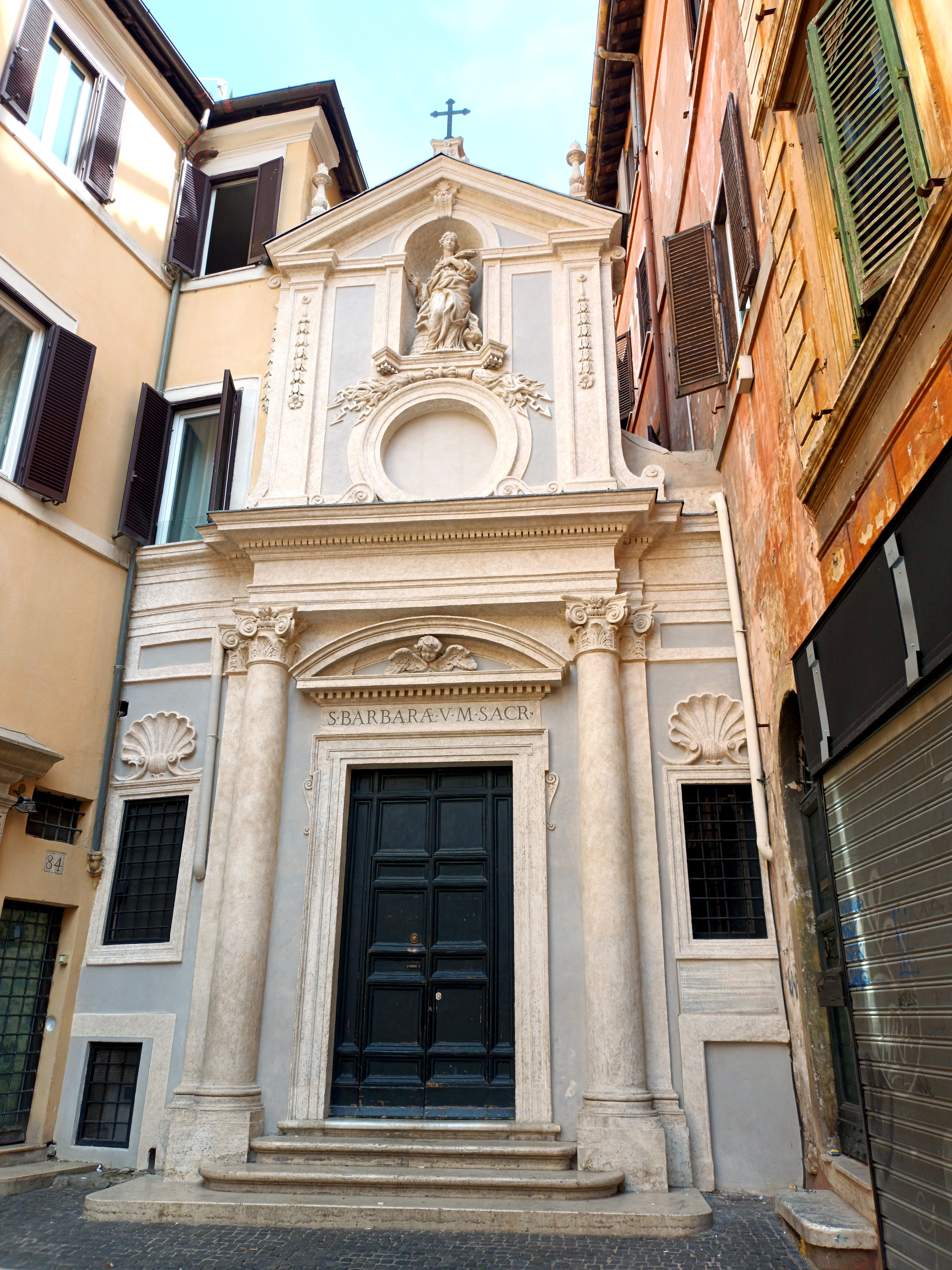
- Façade
- Click on the map for a fullscreen view
- 41°53′41.32″N 12°28′25.49″E
- Location: Via dei Giubbonari, Rome
- Country: Italy
- Denomination: Catholic Church

Architecture
- Architectural type: Church

Santa Barbara dei Librai is a small Roman Catholic church in Rome, Italy. It was once known as Santa Barbara alla Regola after the rione in which it was located. Today it now considered within the rione of Parione, near the Campo de' Fiori.

== History ==
Giuseppe Vasi dates the consecration of the church by 1306, although it is probable that a church existed at the site since the 10-11th century. Inscriptions inside claim that the church was established by Giovanni di Crescenzio de Roizo and his wife Rogata, who was a senator of Rome in the second century. In 1600, it was granted to the confraternity of the Bookmakers (bookbinders, publishers, and scribes) or Librari, who titled the church after St Thomas Acquinas and St John of God as patrons.

During the papacy of Innocent XI, the church was restored. In 1634, after a fire, the confraternity of book makers bought out adjacent properties. The baroque façade was remade by Giuseppe Passeri. The statue of St Barbara over the door was sculpted by Ambrogio Parisi, and the angel painted on a wall is attributed to Guido Reni. The church has paintings by Luigi Garzi; a fresco of St Saba by Giovanni Battista Brughi, pupil of Baciccio, in the chapel of Specchi; and frescoes by Francesco Ragusa and Domenico Monacelli.

The church was used by the confraternity till 1878, but fell into abandon and was deconsecrated. In 1982, it was restored.

The adjacent oratory is sited in the ruins of the Theater of Pompey.

Among the works of art inside the church are:

- Triptych of Madonna and child with John the Baptist and Archangel Michael (1453) by Leonardo da Roma.
- Crucifixion by Garzi

== Gallery ==
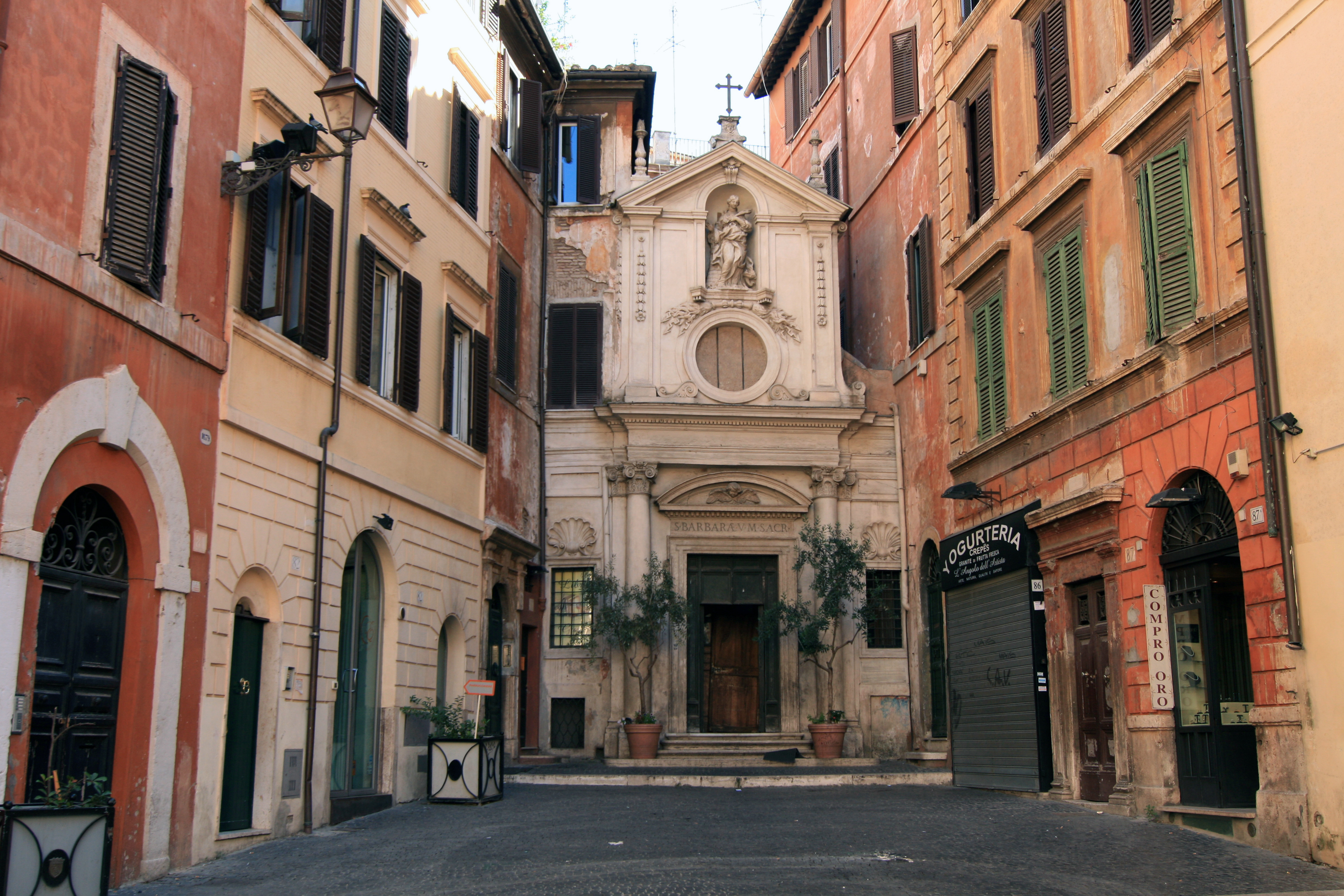
Church exterior

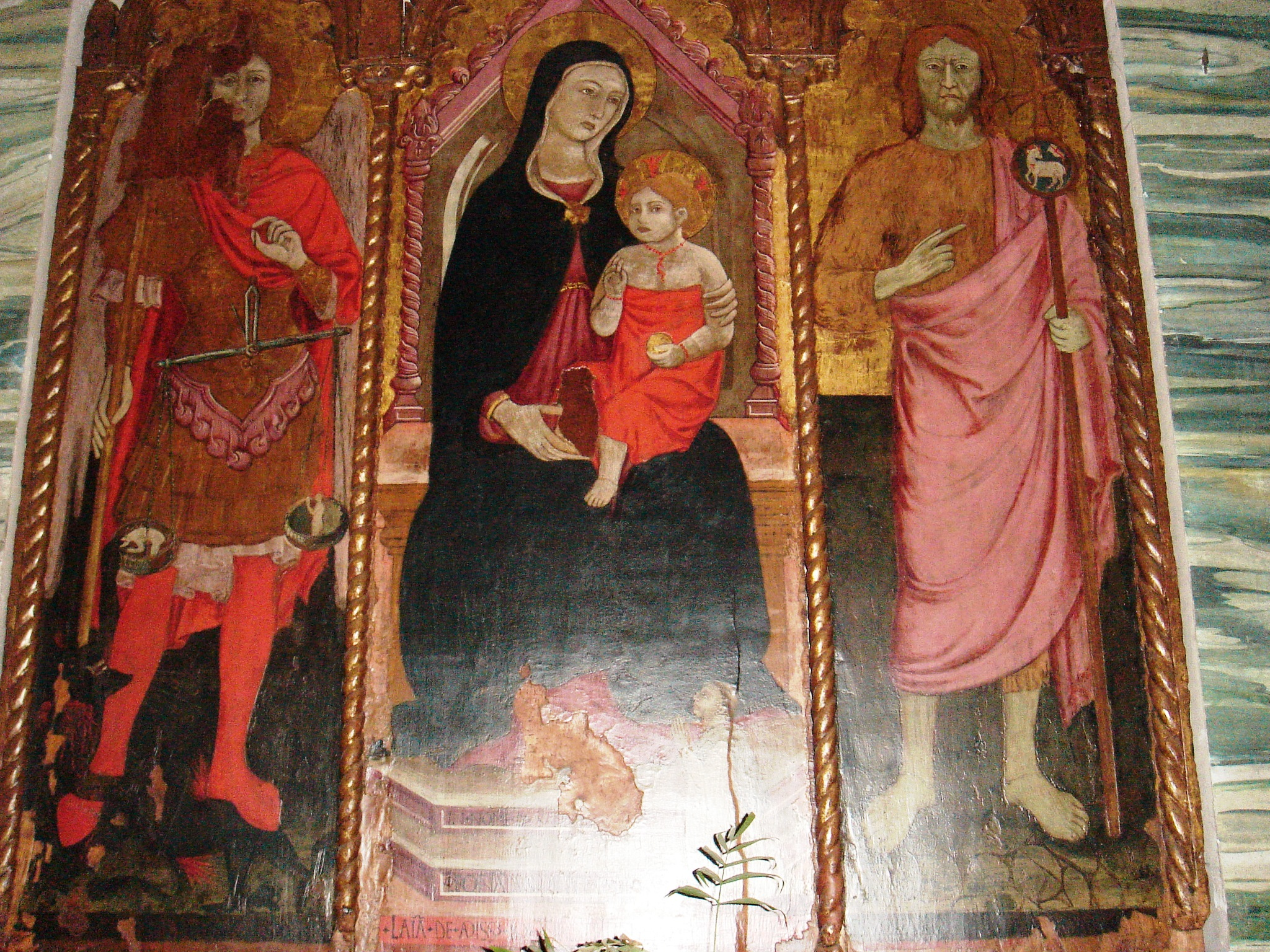
Triptych by Leonardo da Roma

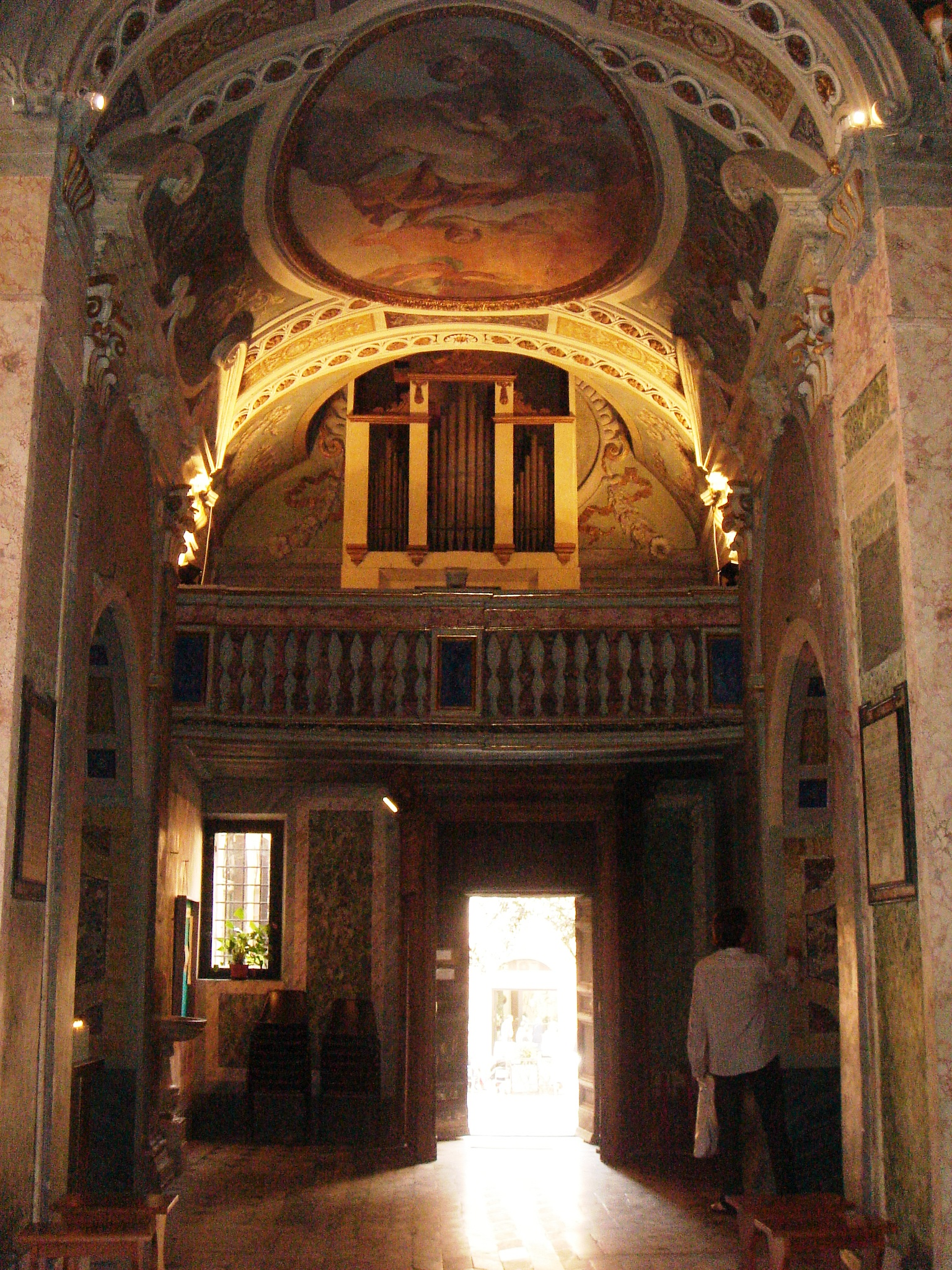
Parione - Santa Barbara dei Librai

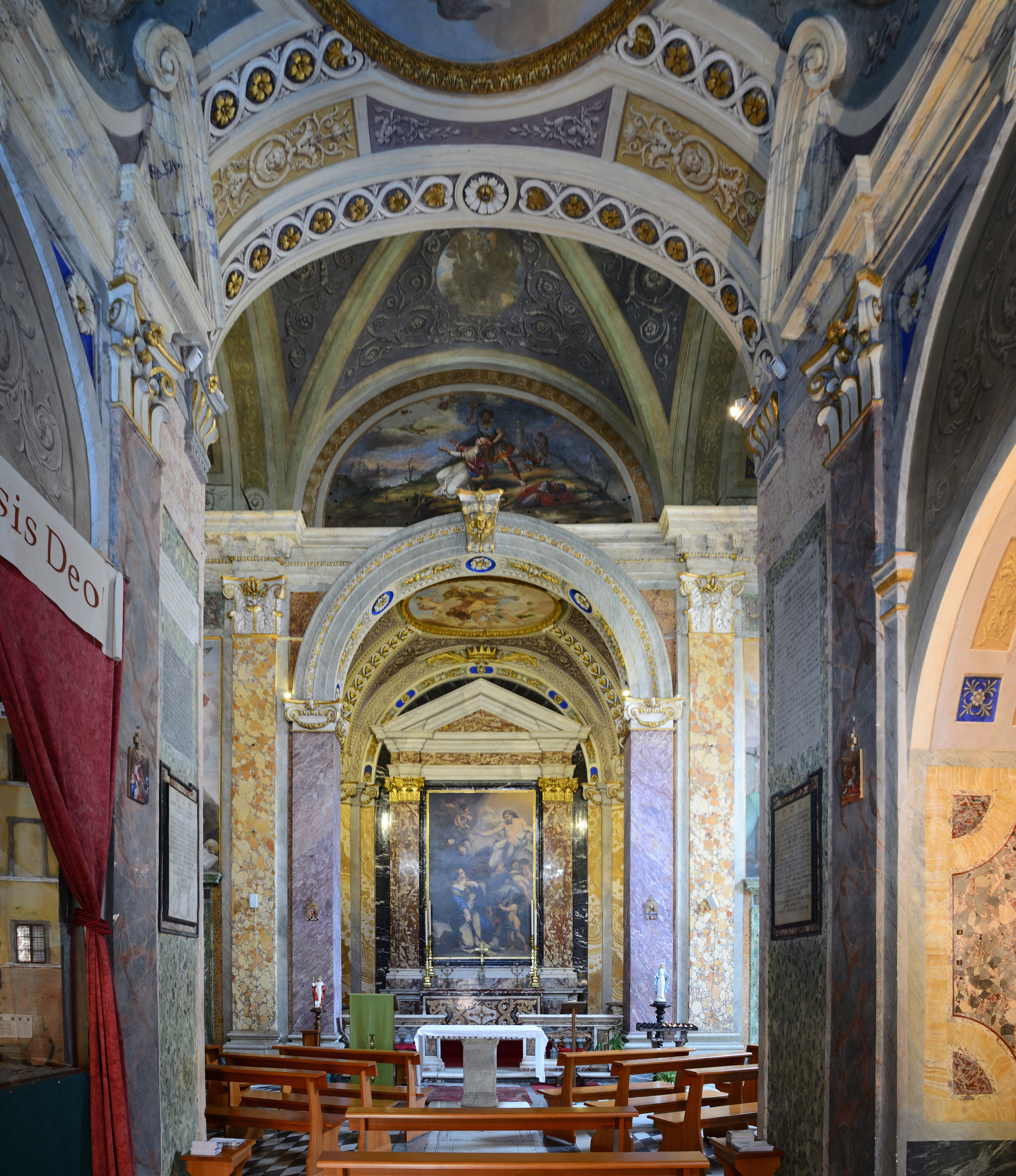
Santa Barbara dei Librai - Interior
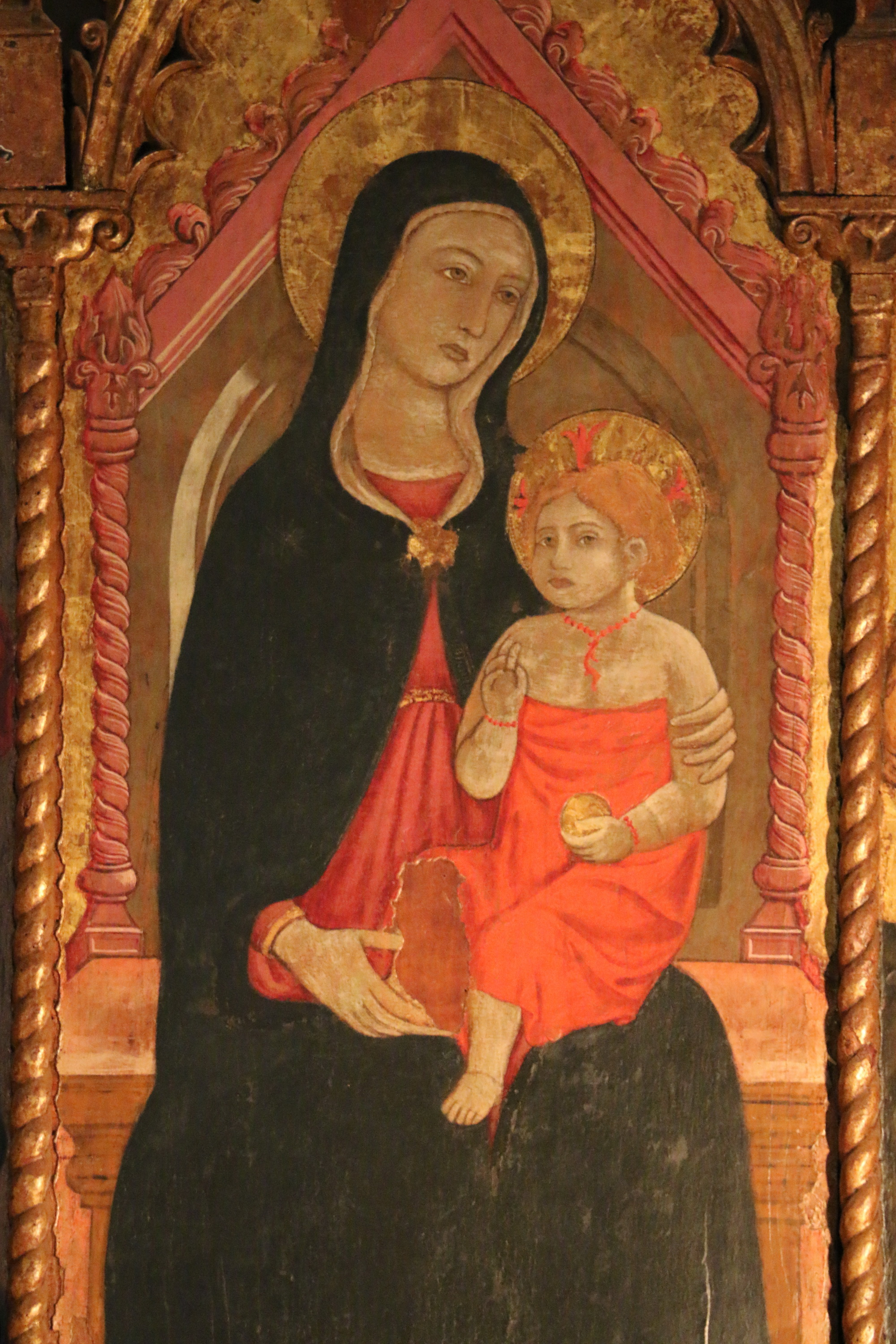
Rome, Santa Maria dei Librai

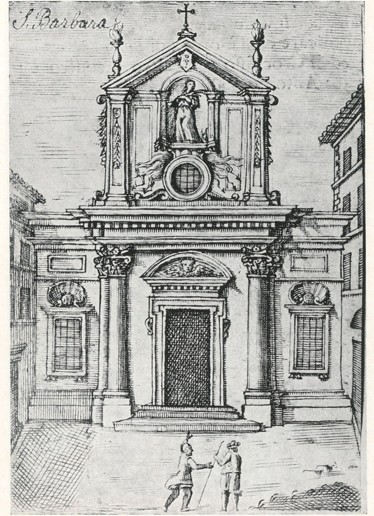
Santa Barbara dei Librari. 17th century engraving

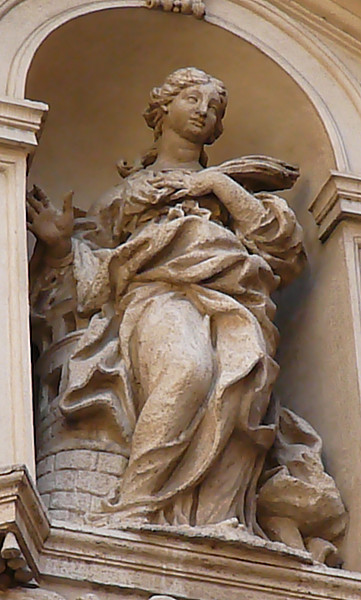
Sculpture on facade depicting Saint Barbara

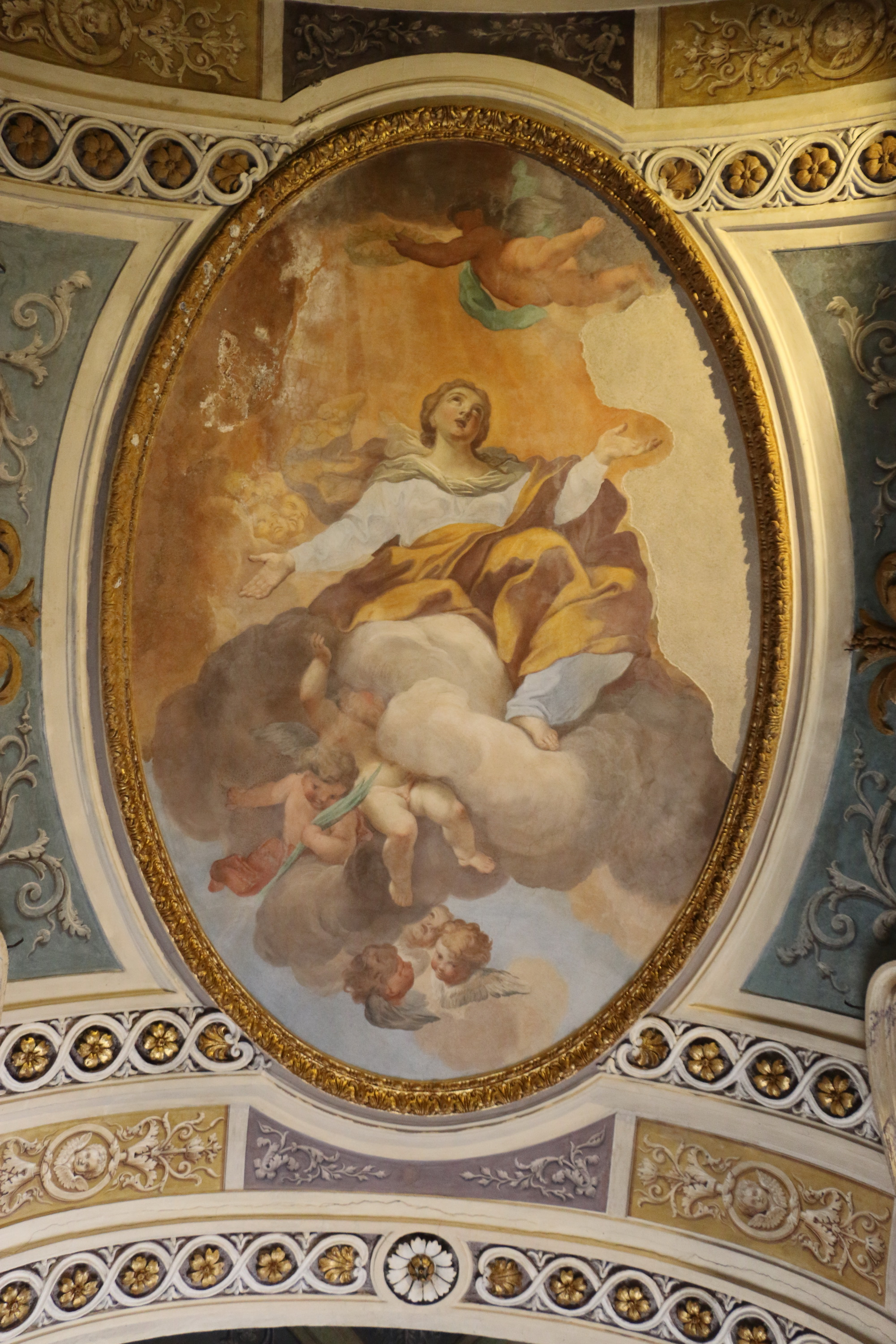
Fresco of Santa Barbara on the nave ceiling

== Sources ==
- Morelli Gonippo, la chiesa di sants Barbara dei librai, Roma 1927
- C. Rendina, Le Chiese di Roma, Newton & Compton Editori, Milano 2000
- C. Cerchiai, Rione V Ponte, in AA.VV, I rioni di Roma, Newton & Compton Editori, Milano 2000, Vol. I, pp. 335–382
- Mariano Armellini, Le chiese di Roma dal secolo IV al XIX, Roma 1891

C. Hulsen, Le chiese di Roma nel Medio Evo, Firenze 1927 F. Titi, Descrizione delle Pitture, Sculture e Architetture esposte in Roma, Roma 1763
