= Triumph of the Name of Jesus =

Fresco painting by Giovanni Battista Gaulli

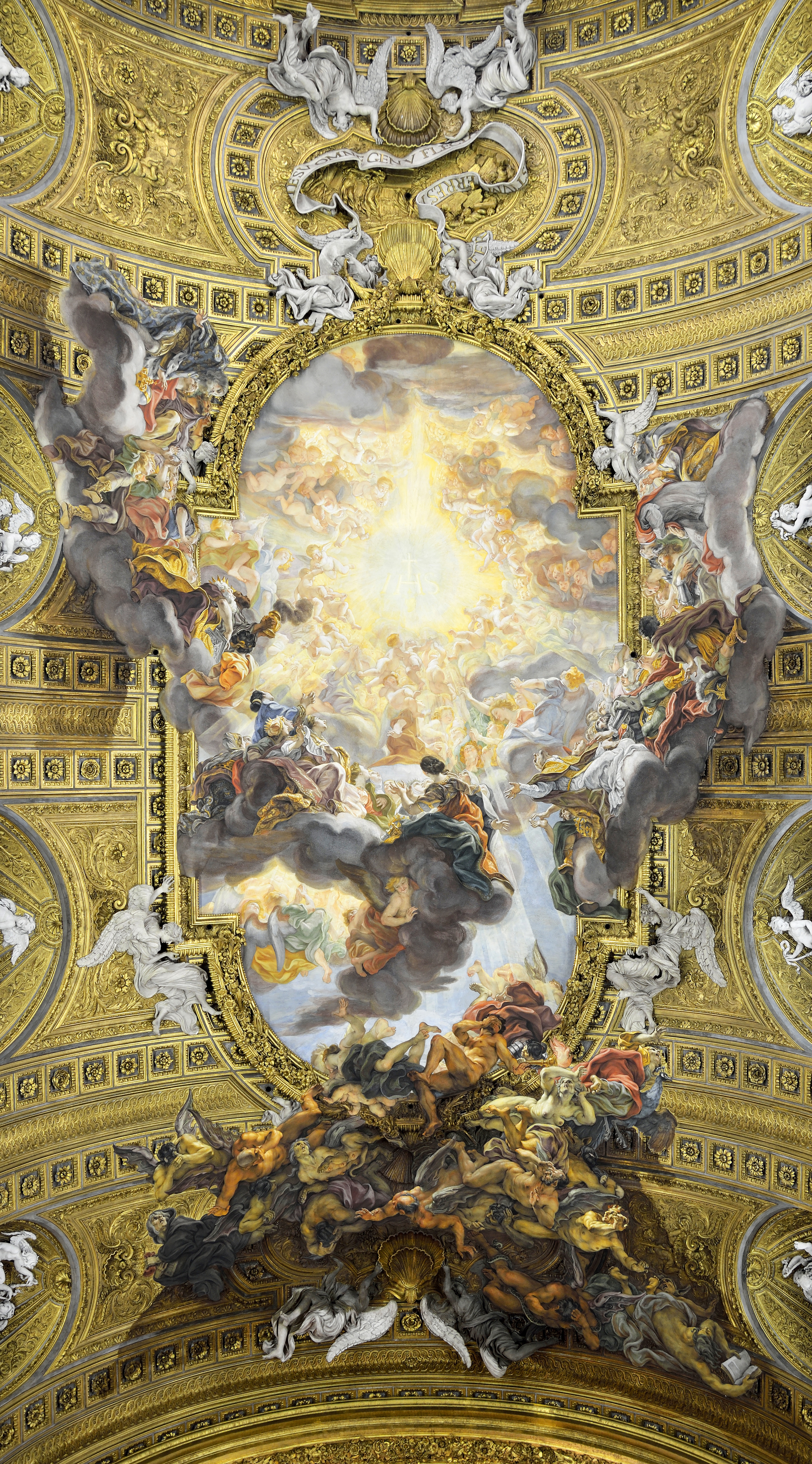
- Artist: Giovanni Battista Gaulli
- Year: 1661–1679
- Type: Ceiling Fresco
- Location: Il Gesù; Rome

Triumph of the Name of Jesus is a 17th-century fresco painting by Giovanni Battista Gaulli. The fresco occupies the nave of the Church of the Gesù in Rome, with both fresco painting and stucco molding.

== Jesuit history ==
The Jesuit Order, or Society of Jesus, was formed in 1534— and given papal approval by Pope Paul III in 1540— by Saint Ignatius of Loyola. The group formed as part of the Counter-Reformation, a reaction to the Protestant Reformation, in an effort to counteract growing religious schisms, such as Calvinism and Protestantism, to restimulate faith in the Catholic Church and Catholic doctrine. Loyola was wounded during his time as a Spanish viceroy; which led to his religious enlightenment. While their teachings would spread over many countries, the heart of the society was the Il Gesu, built in the late 1500s. Gian Paolo Oliva was the Father general of the Society of Jesus.

== Influence and execution ==
=== Bernini's involvement ===
Giovanni Battista Gaulli owes a great deal of his success on the ceiling fresco to Gian Lorenzo Bernini. Several other artists were considered for the job of painting the ceiling. Gian Paolo Oliva relied on Bernini's opinion when selecting the artist for the ceiling.

Bernini is responsible for not only obtaining the commission for Gaulli, but also for inspiring some of the designs. If not for Bernini's illusionistic merging of architecture and sculpture, in the Ecstasy of Saint Teresa at the Cornaro Chapel in Santa Maria della Vittoria, Gaulli's ceiling fresco may have turned out quite differently. The illusionistic heavens upon the ceiling of the Gesu emphasizes how the church is seen as an intermediary between the mortal world and eternal salvation. Gaulli also enacts a certain level of theatrics to the scene, yet again, similar to that found in the Cornaro Chapel. The golden light representing the divine surrounding by putti in Bernini's Cathedra Petri may have additionally inspired part of Gaulli's work.

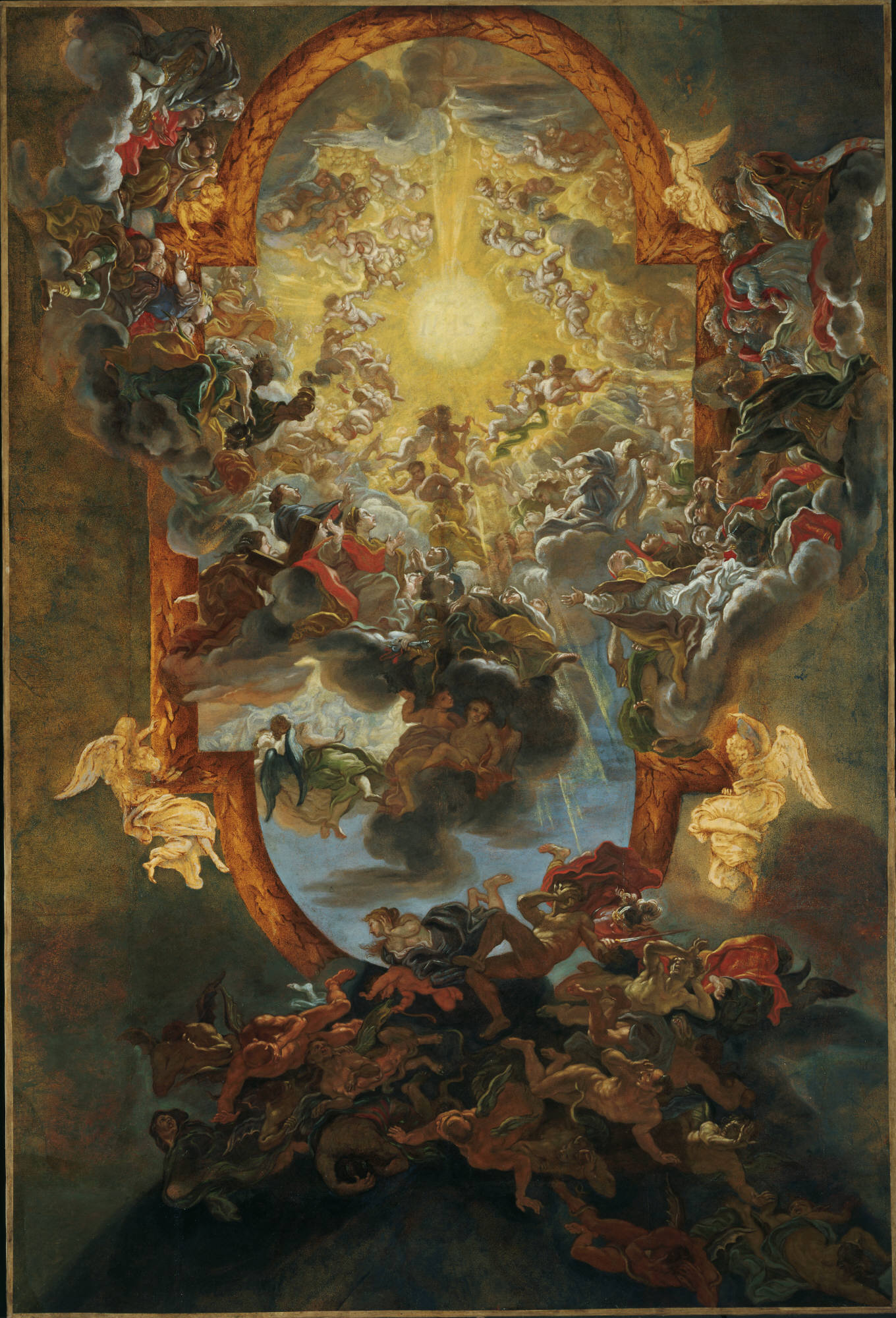
Bozzetto (preliminary oil sketch) for Gaulli's Triumph in the Name of Jesus

=== Sketch ===
In preparation for the ceiling fresco, Gaulli created sketches of the work (shown) from 1676 to 1679. The oil working sketch is made on fourteen stacked sheets of laid paper. It was later attached to a canvas and is now hosted in the Princeton University Art Museum. The three incised arches featured in the sketch, under infrared light, show partially-decipherable inscriptions detailing the location of scaffolding that was used to allow Gaulli (among other artist) to reach the high-up ceiling in the church.

== Triumph of the Name of Jesus ==
The subject of Gaulli's ceiling fresco is the Adoration of the Name of Jesus, the story is taken from Saint Paul's Epistle to the Philippians. On a carved ribbon, just outside the architectural frame, his words are written as follows: "In Nomine Iesu Omne Genu Flectatur Coelestium, Terrestrium et Infernorum" which approximately translates to "In the Name of Jesus let every knee bow, of those that are in heaven, on earth, and under the earth". These words set the scene for Gaulli's fresco and focus on the spreading of faith. The Jesuits wanted to enhance the religious experience, with an almost meditative, emotional peace. These stucco ceiling decorations were designed by Antonio Raggi and Leonardo Reti

The high vaulted ceiling was not constructed merely for its grand and impressive appearance, but to enhance the experience during mass. The Jesuits relied heavily on the acoustics of the church; they wanted their faithful to clearly hear the words of the sermon, ergo the church was constructed with a single nave with more-compressed transepts.

One of Gaulli's best innovations is the dramatic breaking of the three-dimensional frame. This gives the impression that the heavenly figures above have a true presence in the church, as if they are floating directly over the viewers' heads. The depth achieved in the fresco extends past the physical ceiling, drawing the blessed upward into the infinite sky. Gaulli adds a pronounced, stucco, frame around his fresco; emphasizing the illusionistic division of the vault's interior and exterior space. When the viewer gazes upon the fresco it is almost impossible to differentiate between fresco and stucco molding. This adds to the illusion of the scene, making it more believable that there are souls ascending and descending in front of the viewer.

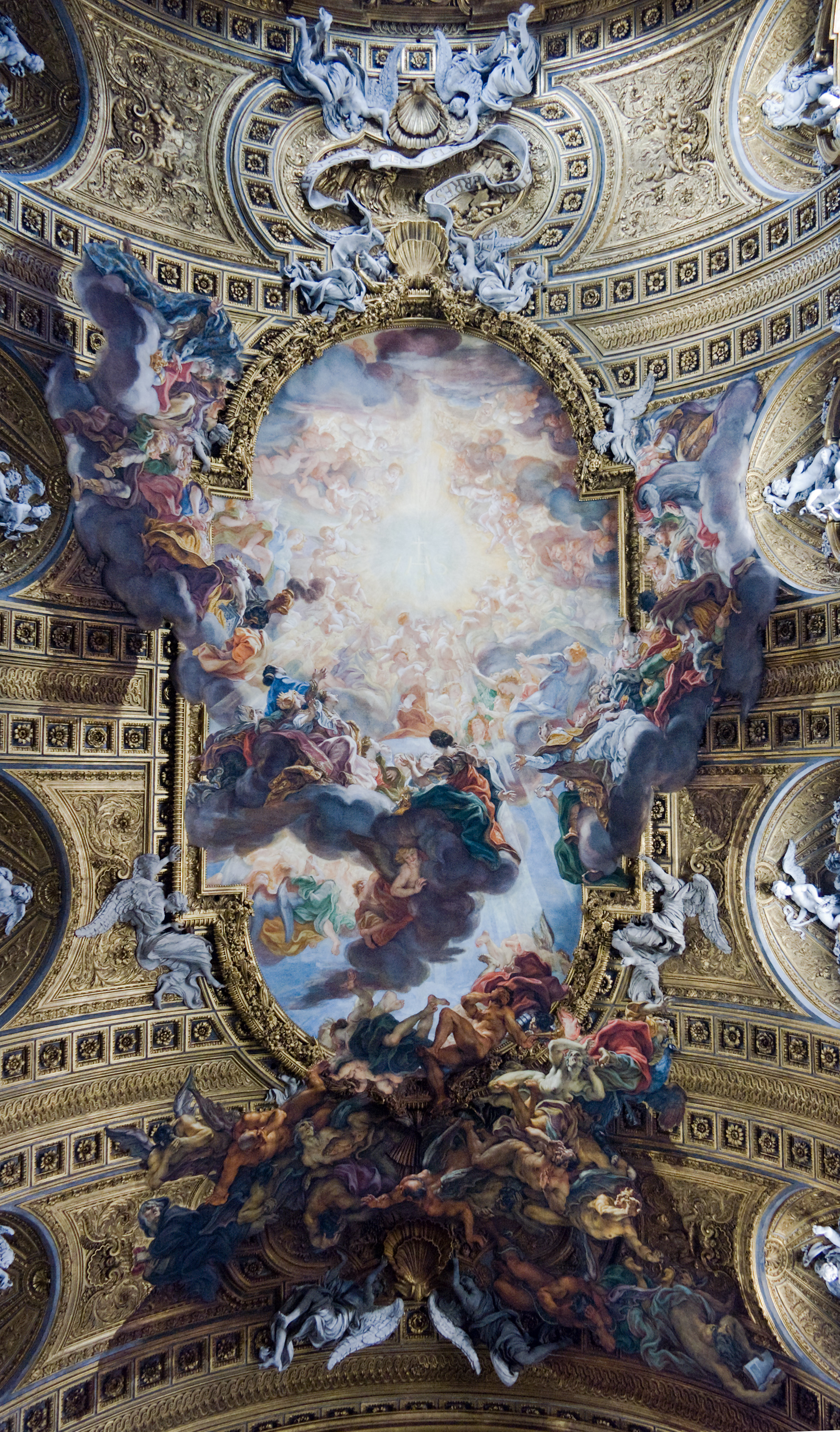
Worship of the Holy Name of Jesus Church of the Gesù

There are minute details within the fresco. Gaulli took into consideration the perspective viewers would have, looking up at the ceiling, and painted the saved in an extremely foreshortened fashion to give the false illusion that they were truly floating above the viewers. This trompe-l'œil draws the viewer in, allowing the viewer's eyes to move upward through the ascending angels. It also tricks the viewer into thinking the fresco has some dimension to it; evoking a sense of spiritual nature.

At the apex of the heavenly light there is an almost hidden inscription of IHS, the first three letters of Jesus's name in Greek. This is the only representation of Christ in the ceiling painting. Christ is considered the light of the world; Gaulli took this literally when choosing to depict Christ by his initials and the heavenly light.

Another detail within the fresco is Gaulli's attention to shadowing. The damned fall out of the frame, with the illusion that they are falling into the church. While the heavenly golden light falls upon the saved, “the illusionistic clouds” block this light from the damned; “indicat[ing] that the {damned are} destined for eternal damnation.” There is an evident difference between the depicted angels and the damned. Gaulli's angels are flawless creatures; each kissed by the golden light of heaven. The pigment in their clothes, would resonate with the earthly clothes of the viewers. Their faces adoringly look upward towards the light of heaven. Meanwhile, the damned fall from heaven, faces pained, screaming, some too ashamed they look away. Their bodies cast under a dark shadow, while their bodies slowly morph. Some age drastically, while other are transformed into monsters. The damned, outside of the frame, are presented nude, representing the idea that nudity is to be considered shameful.

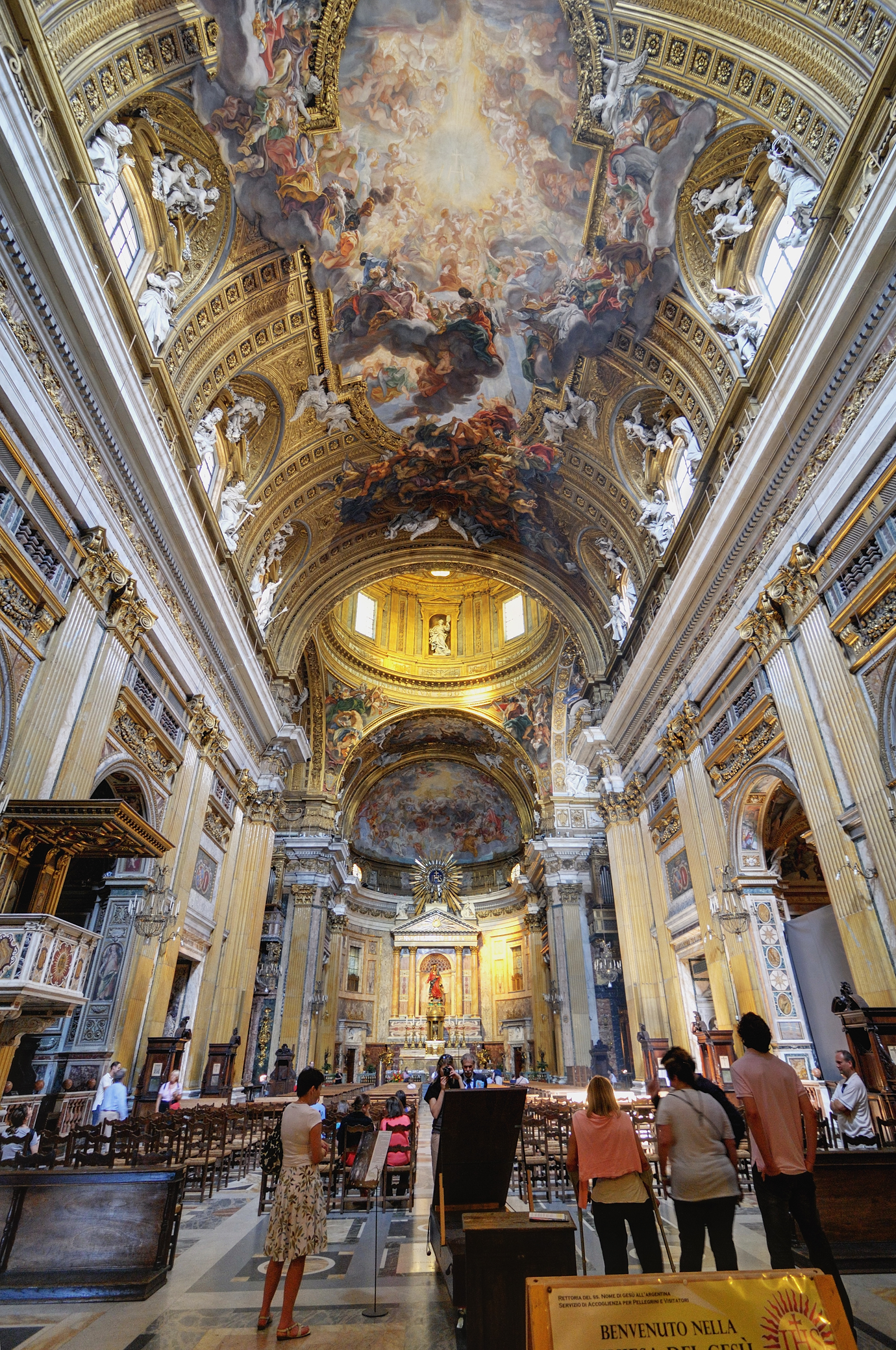
Nave of the Church of the Gesù

Gaulli's fresco can be broken up into three different parts. There is the heavenly light and Christ's initials at the center, the arc of clouds the separate the saved from the damned, and the damned figures falling out of the scene. The blessed that rest upon the clouds hang just elbow the frame, giving the illusion that have not yet ascended outside the church into the heavens above. They all still resemble the human form; these qualities give hope to the viewers that salvation is not impossible. The damned greatly contrast that with their corrupted human form. Some of the damned are depicted with wings, claws, and horns. Others are in the process of transforming into hound-like creatures. They have tormented faces, some shielding their faces from the harsh heavenly light. Gaulli has adapted the Triumph of the Name of Jesus to extend both downward to the viewers and upward into the illusionistic heavens, relying on his friend Bernini to influence and inspire one of his greatest works. Illusionistic ceiling paintings began to move in new directions after the completion of this piece. Gaulli's fresco has a complexity to it, making it a work worthy of a High Baroque status.
