= Giovanni Battista Brughi =

Italian painter and mosaic artist

Giovanni Battista Brughi (1681 – 1731) was an Italian painter and mosaic artist of the late-Baroque period.

== Biography ==
He was born in Rome, and pupil of Giovanni Battista Gaulli. He abandoned painting to become a mosaic artist.
