= Antonio Raggi =

Italian artist (1624–1686)

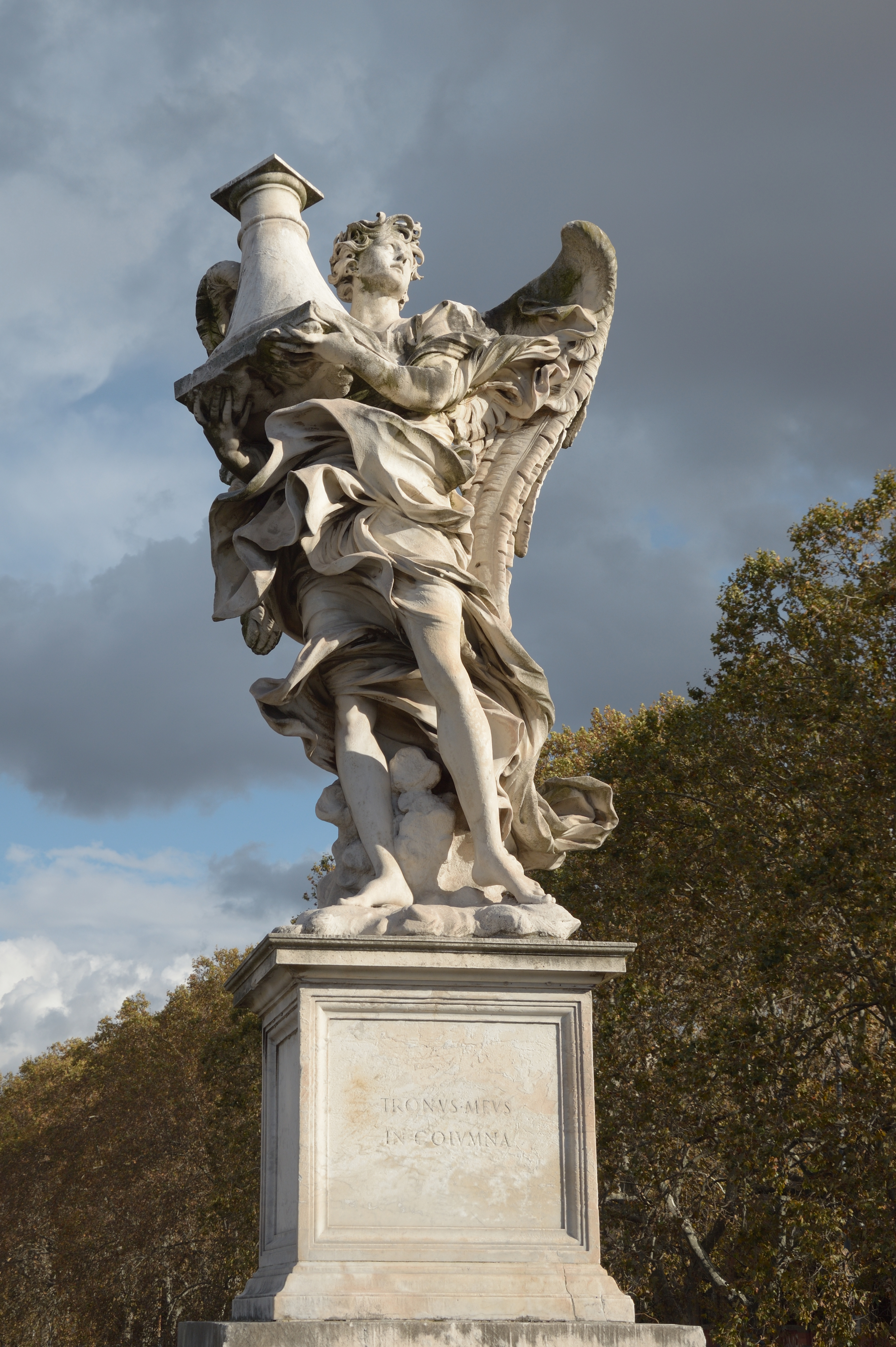
- Angel with the Column, Ponte Sant'Angelo, Rome.
- Born: 1624; Vico Morcote, Ticino
- Died: 1686 (aged 61–62); Rome
- Education: Gianlorenzo Bernini
- Known for: sculpture
- Notable work: Death of Saint Cecilia, Baptism of Christ, Angel with the Column

Antonio Raggi (1624–1686), also called Antonio Lombardo, was a sculptor of the Roman Baroque, originating from today's Ticino.

== Biography ==
He was born in Vico Morcote on the Lake Lugano. His mentor in Rome for nearly three decades was Gianlorenzo Bernini. He initially joined the studio of Alessandro Algardi, but none of his work there is independently recognized and by 1647, like Ercole Ferrata, Raggi was working for Bernini, for whom he was to become his closest and most prolific pupil. "In most cases Bernini supplied Raggi with detailed modelli and supervised his work closely enough so that Raggi's statues express Bernini's conceit almost as well as a statue from Bernini's own hand."

He completed the stucco decoration of San Tomaso di Villanova in Castel Gandolfo (1660–1), the stucco decoration of Bernini's Sant'Andrea 1662–1665), the statues of Saint Bernardino and Pope Alexander VII Chigi for Duomo di Siena and the Virgin and Child in Saint Joseph des Carmes in Paris (1650–51). He made the Baptism of Christ for Borromini's altar of San Giovanni dei Fiorentini (c. 1665). Recently discovered documentation shows that he provided the kneeling figure of Saint Bernardino of Siena (1656–57) in Alexander VII's chapel at Santa Maria della Pace, and the two pairs of putti holding portrait medallions on the façade.

His masterpiece is the marble relief of the Death of Saint Cecilia, in the church of Sant'Agnese in Agone, Piazza Navona. Here it can be contrasted with the relief by Algardi's pupil Ercole Ferrata, of the Stoning of Santa Emerenziana.

Raggi was instrumental in completing illusionistic stucco decoration accompanying Giovanni Battista Gaulli's ceiling fresco as other stucco figures in the Church of the Gesù. He was helped by Leonardo Retti, Michele Maglia, and Paolo Naldini. His stucco Saint Andrew (early 1660s) in Sant' Andrea della Valle (Sant'Andrea Quirinale), follows Bernini's design depicting the emaciated apostle rising to Heaven on a wisp of cloud amid a swirl of drapery.

He completed one of the ten angels carrying instruments of the Passion on the Ponte Sant'Angelo (illustration), based on a sketch provided by Bernini, and the statue of the Danube (carved in 1650–51) in Bernini's Fountain of Four Rivers in Piazza Navona. He was elected to the Accademia di San Luca on 1 July 1657. Raggi died in Rome.

== Gallery ==
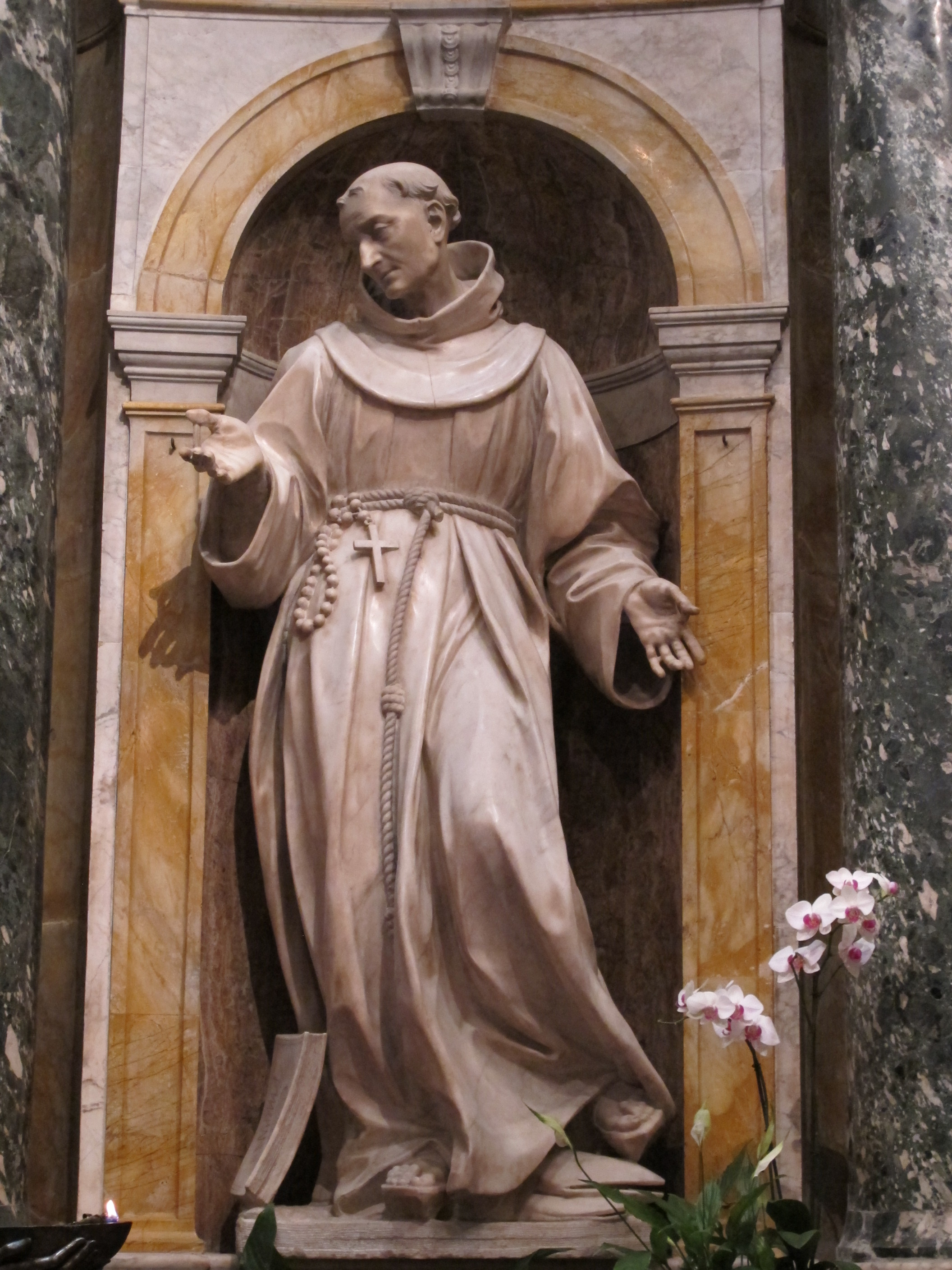
St Bernard, Chigi Chapel, Siena.

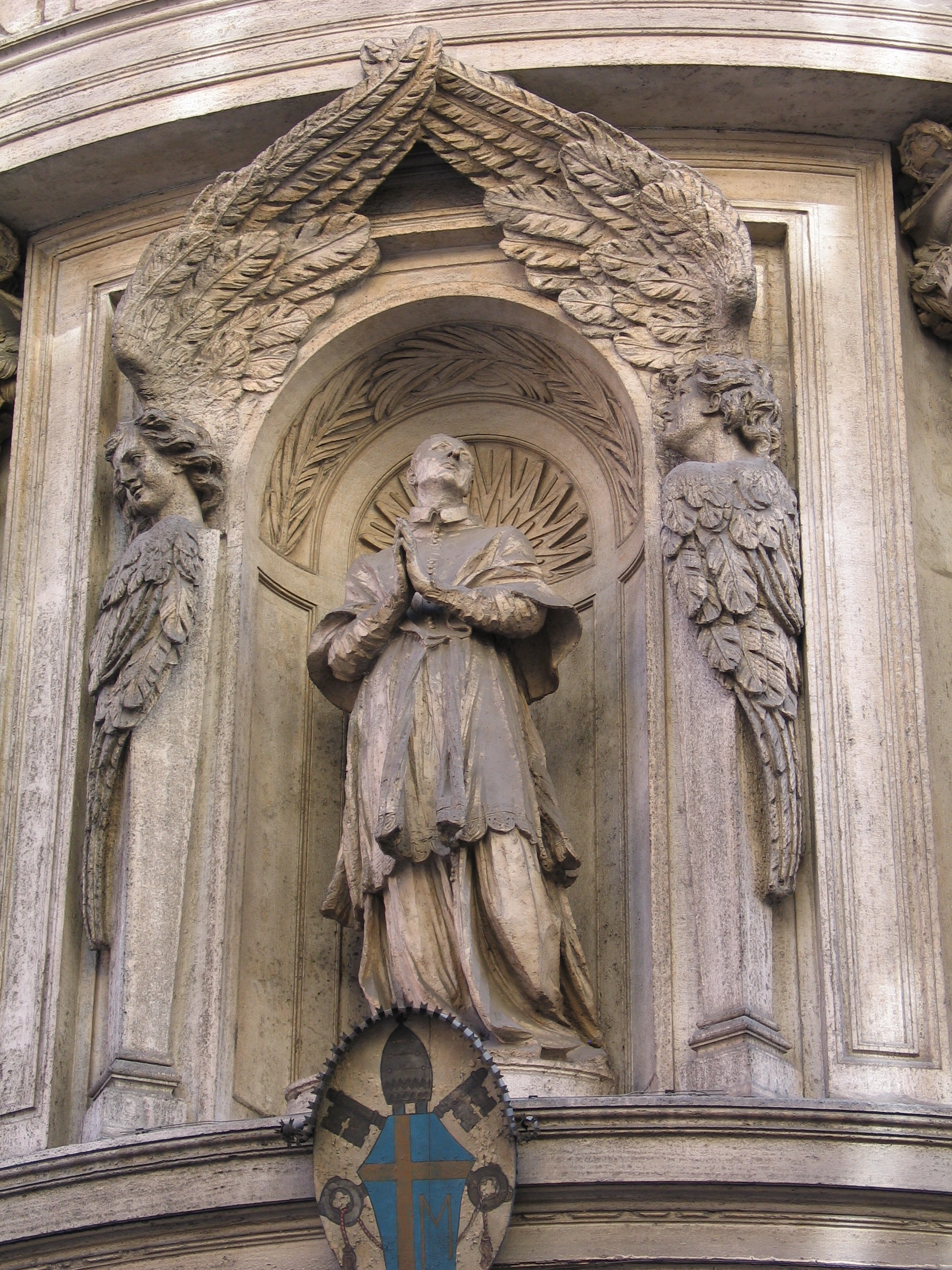
St Carlo Borromeo, Facade of San Carlino, Rome.

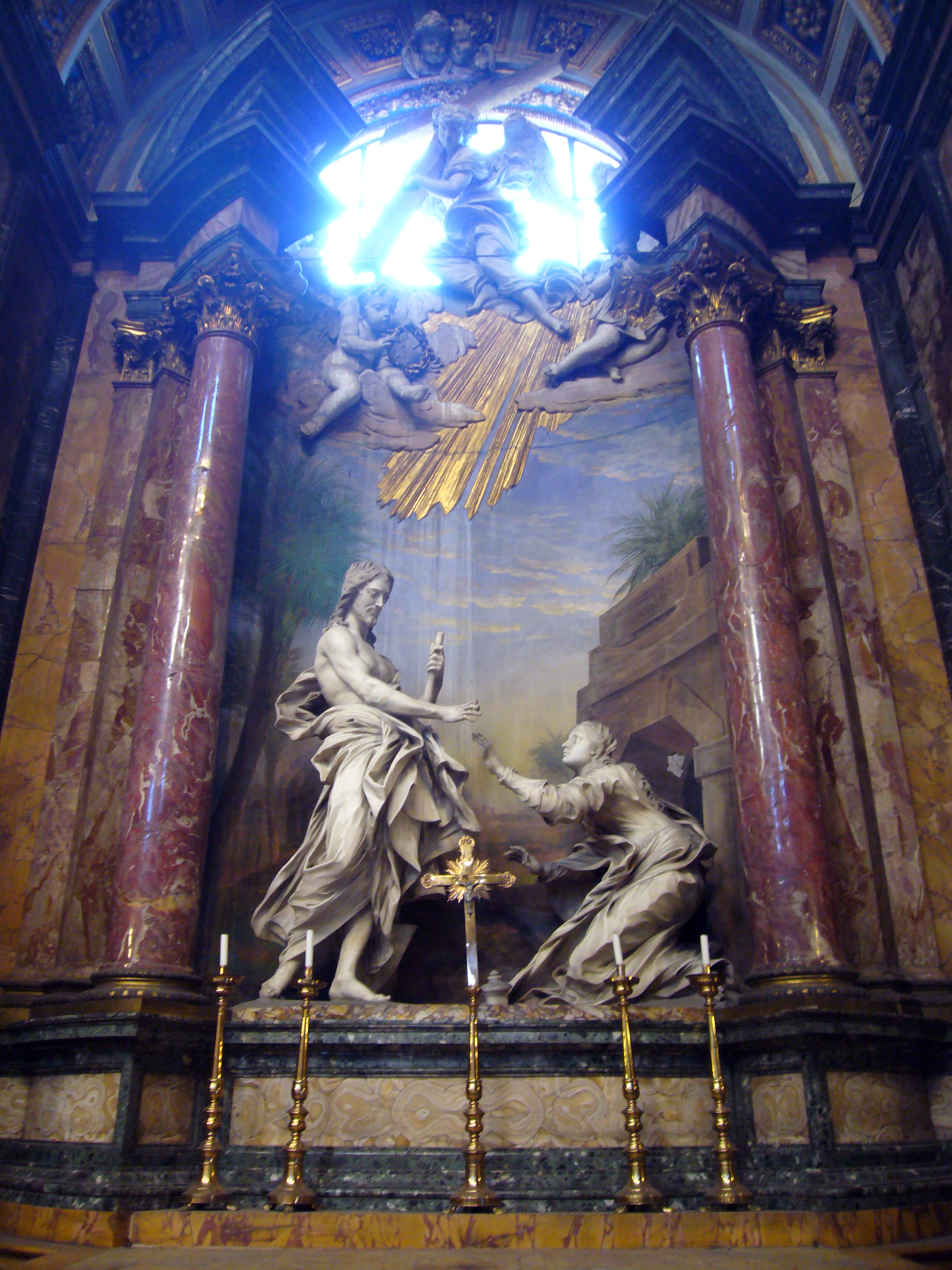
Noli Me Tangere, SS Domenico e Sisto, Rome.

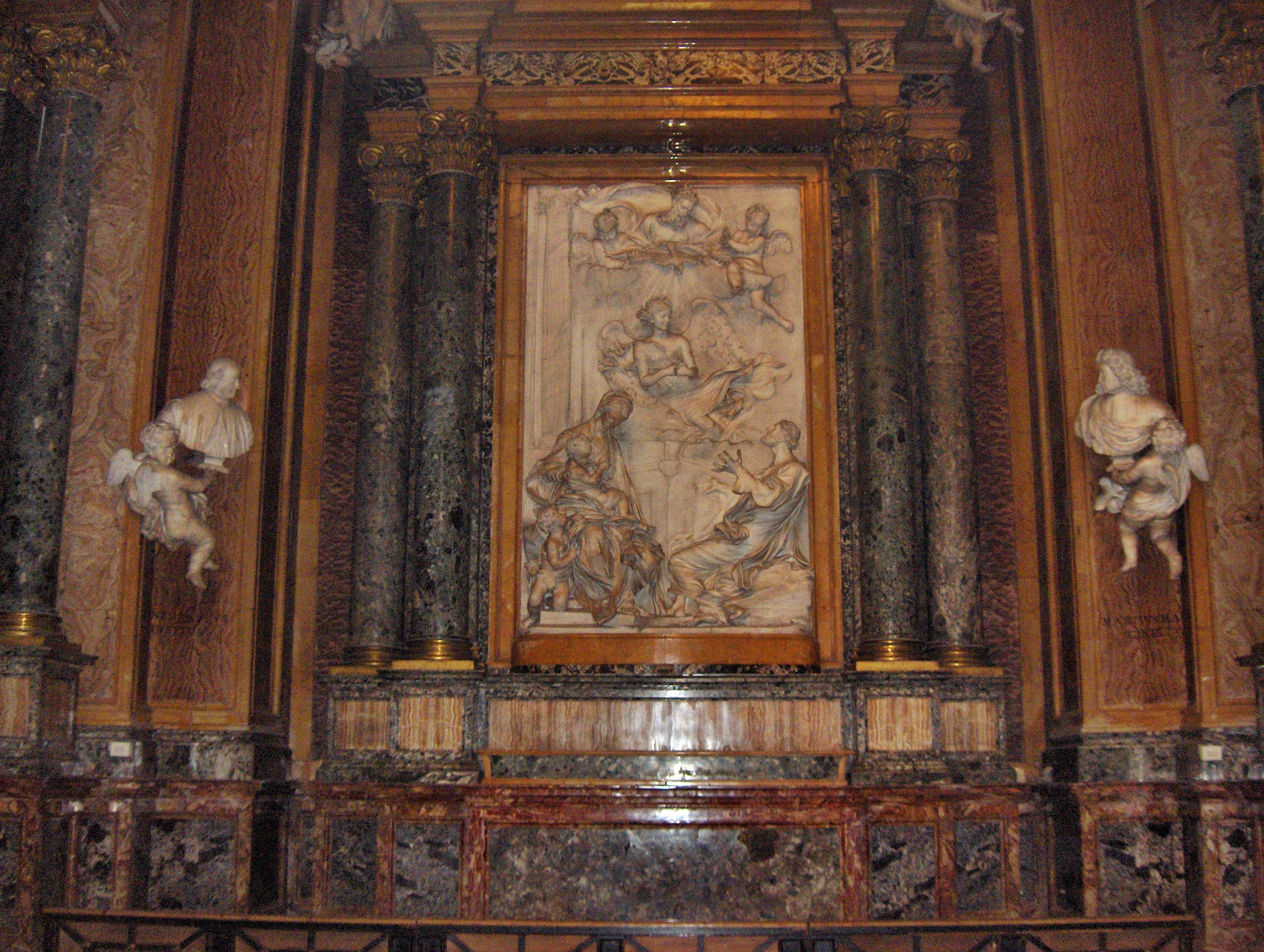
Angel Urges Flight to Egypt (1675) with busts of flanking donors, Ginnetti chapel, Sant'Andrea della Valle, Rome.

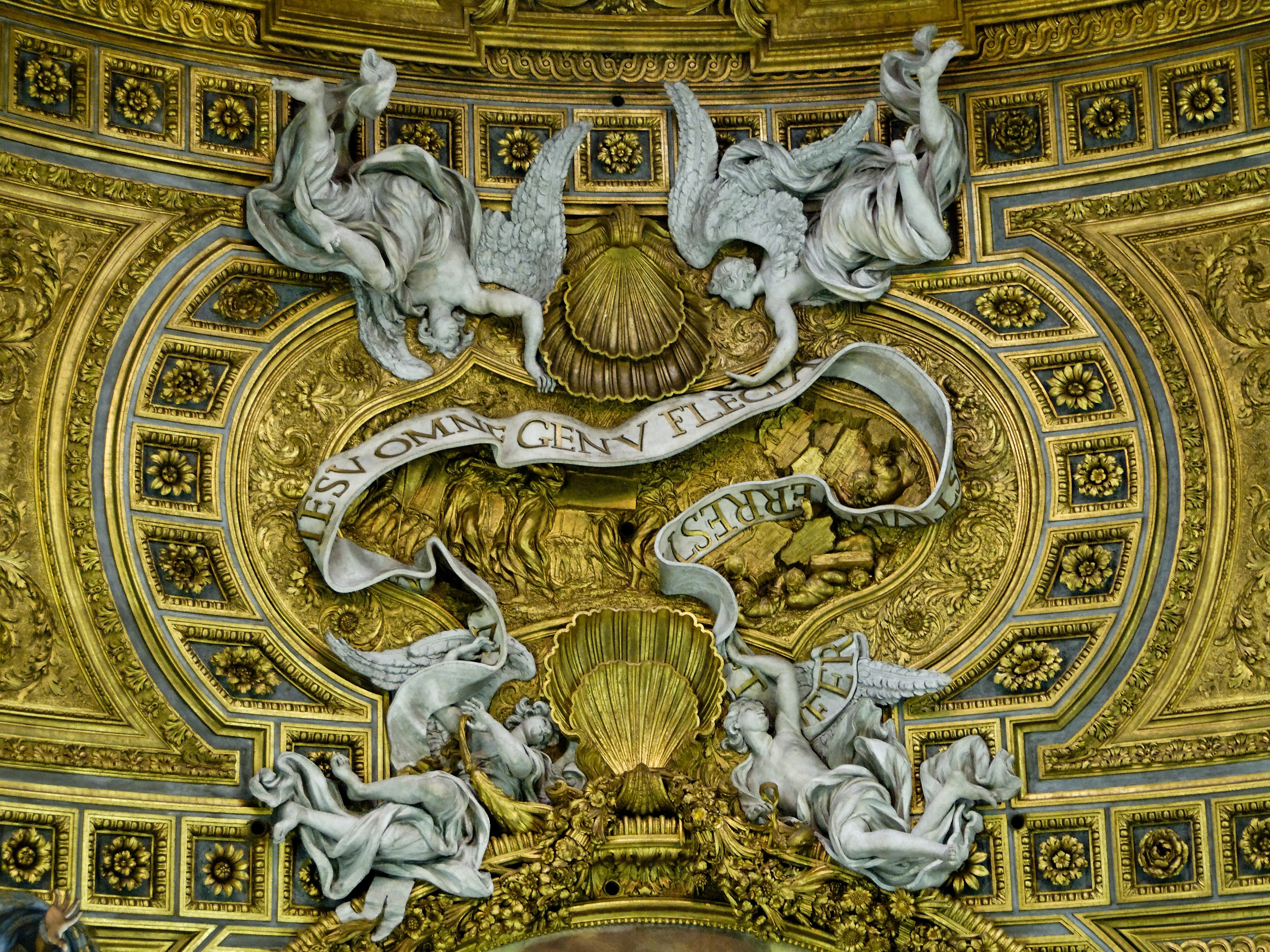
Ut in nomine Jesu omne genu flectatur coelestium, terrestrium et infernorum Raggi and Retti, design by Baciccio. Vault of Gesù, Rome.
