= Francesco Ragusa =

Italian painter

Francesco Ragusa (1590s – 1655) was an Italian painter of the late-Mannerist and early-Baroque period, active in mainly in Rome.

- Not to be confused with Italian actor Francesco Ragusa of From the Clouds to the Resistance.

== Biography ==
He was born in Sicily and pupil of Giuseppe Cesari in Rome, but soon also influenced by Caravaggio. He is mentioned by Giovanni Baglione in his biographies.

He painted a mannerist altarpiece depicting the Trinity and Saints Bonaventure and Carlo Borromeo for the church of Cappuccini a Colpersìto in San Severino Marche. He also painted a Mystical Marriage of St Catherine with St Charles Borromeo (1618) for the Diocese of Spoleto. He painted a Coronation of the Virgin and St Michael Archagel (1651) for the Olivetan church of the Santissimi Trinità in Giuliana. Most of Ragusa's Roman paintings were lost, except the Portrait of Gaspare Celio (circa 1640), which was inserted in his funeral monument at Santa Maria del Popolo, Rome.
