= Sacred Heart of Jesus (Batoni) =

Painting by Pompeo Batoni

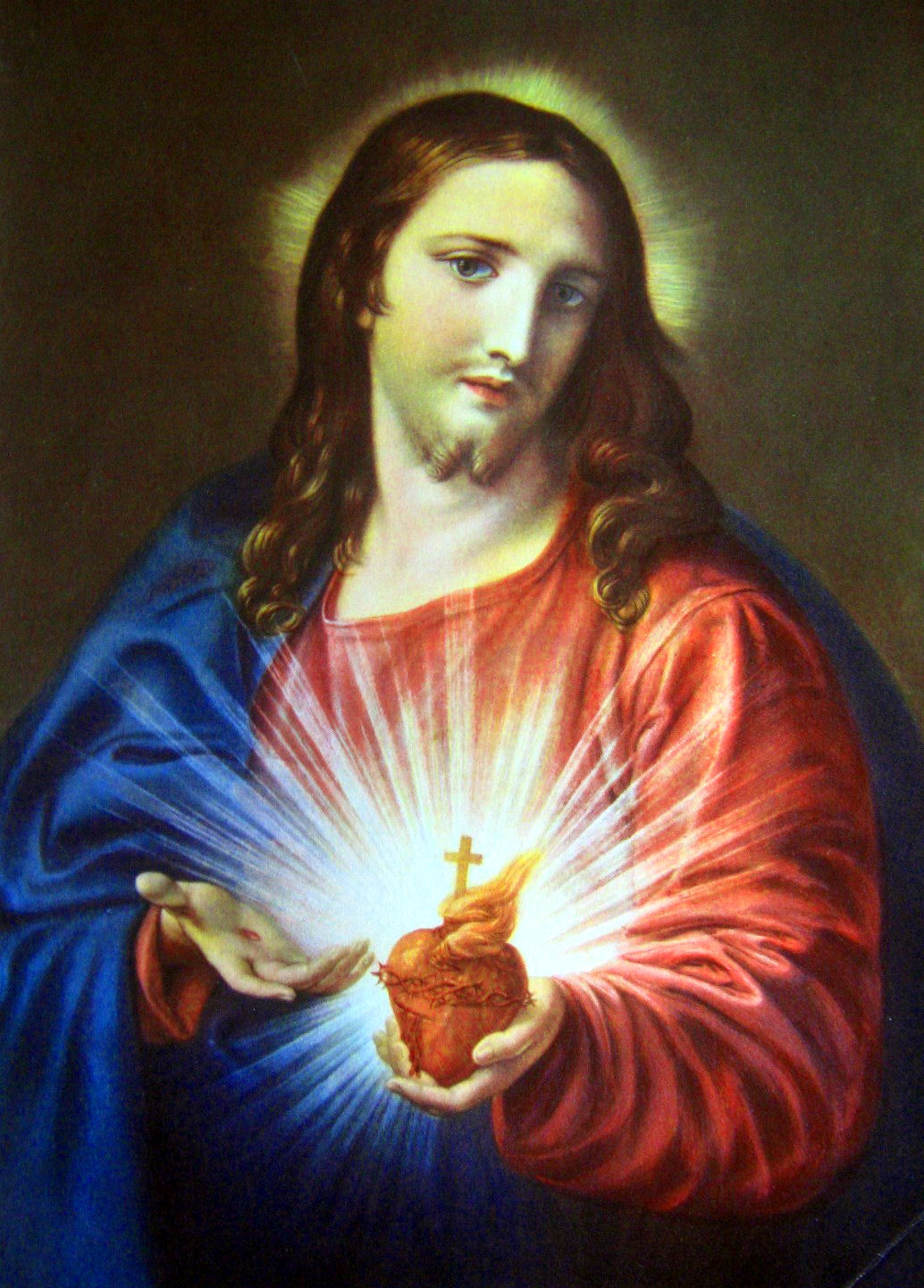
- Artist: Pompeo Batoni
- Year: 1767
- Medium: Oil on canvas
- Dimensions: 74.8 cm × 62.2 cm (29.4 in × 24.5 in)
- Location: Church of the Gesù, Rome

The Sacred Heart of Jesus is an oil painting by the Italian artist Pompeo Batoni, painted in 1767.

== Description ==
The work depicts Christ wearing a red tunic symbolising his blood, martyrdom and humanity; and a blue mantle which symbolises heaven and his divinity. Batoni gave Jesus long hair and a sparse beard, while in his left hand is his heart aflame, with a crown of thorns and topped by a cross. Batoni's painting became the most popular devotional image for the Sacred Heart of Jesus.

== History ==
Batoni was born 18 years after Saint Margaret Mary Alacoque died, the Visitadine nun whose visions of Jesus and his Sacred Heart inform any depictions. These apparitions were said to have begun as she prayed to Jesus in the Blessed Sacrament on 27 December 1673 – the feast of Saint John the Evangelist.

She described his Sacred Heart as follows: "The Divine Heart was presented to me in a throne of flames, more resplendent than a sun, transparent as crystal, with this adorable wound. And it was surrounded with a crown of thorns, signifying the punctures made in it by our sins, and a cross above signifying that from the first instant of His Incarnation, [...] the cross was implanted into it [...]."

The Batoni portrait remains an altarpiece in the northern side chapel of the Jesuits’ Church of the Gesù in Rome.

Batoni was later commissioned by Maria I of Portugal in the 1780s to create a larger series of paintings on the same subject for the Basilica of the Sacred Heart of Jesus in Lisbon.
