= Gaspare Celio =

Italian painter (1571–1640)

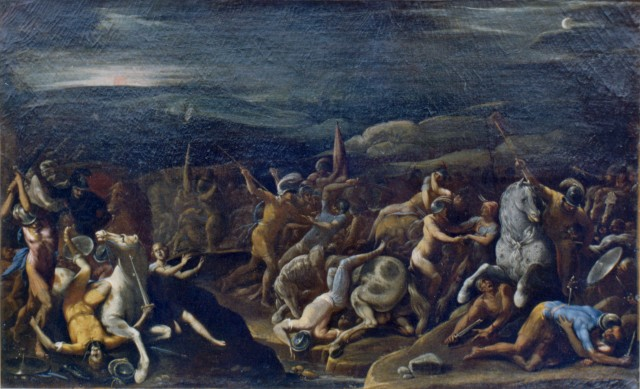
Battle Scene, Borghese Gallery, Rome.

Gaspare Celio (1571 in Rome–November 24, 1640 in Rome) was an Italian painter of the late-Mannerist and early-Baroque period, active mainly in his native city of Rome.

Celio was the pupil of Circignani, according to Baglione, but of Cristoforo Roncalli, if we are to believe Abate Titi.

His first commissions in about 1596 were completed with Giuseppe Valeriano who asked Celio to decorate the Chapel of the Passion in the church of il Gesù in Rome. This work was done after the design of P. Giovanni Battista Fiammeri. He also paints a Madonna and Bambino, now in Santa Maria del Carmine, a The Passage of Moses through the Red Sea (1607) in a vault of the Palazzo Mattei, a Death of the Giants. He painted a St Francis for the altar of the Ospizio at Ponte Sisto. He painted a History of S. Raimondo at the Santa Maria sopra Minerva.

Between 1620 -1638 he helps publish a guide to the churches and artwork in Rome (Memoria delli nomi dell'artefici delle pitture che sono in alcune chiese, facciate e palazzi di Roma). He engraved antique statues. He briefly worked in Parma as a painter for the court of Ranuccio Farnese.

He was buried in the Basilica of Santa Maria del Popolo, Rome, where still stands his funeral monument.

== Works ==
- Works at the Capilla della Passione (1596), iglesia del Gesù, Rome
- Virgin and Child or Madonna (Santa Maria del Carmine)
- The Passage of Moses Through the Red Sea (1607), in the vault of Palazzo Mattei
- Death of the Giants Palazzo Mattei, Rome
- Works at the Capilla Altieri (1622), San Francesco a Ripa, Rome
  - Ludovica Albertoni
  - Saint Charles Borromeo
  - Holy Family and Saint Anne
- St. Francis, an altar of the Ospizio at Ponte Sisto
- History of Saint Raymond, Santa Maria sopra Minerva
- Battle Scene (Borghese Gallery, Rome)
