= Church of the Gesù =

Mother church of the Catholic Society of Jesus in Rome

- Church of the Most Holy Name of Jesus
- Chiesa del Santissimo Nome di Gesù (Italian)
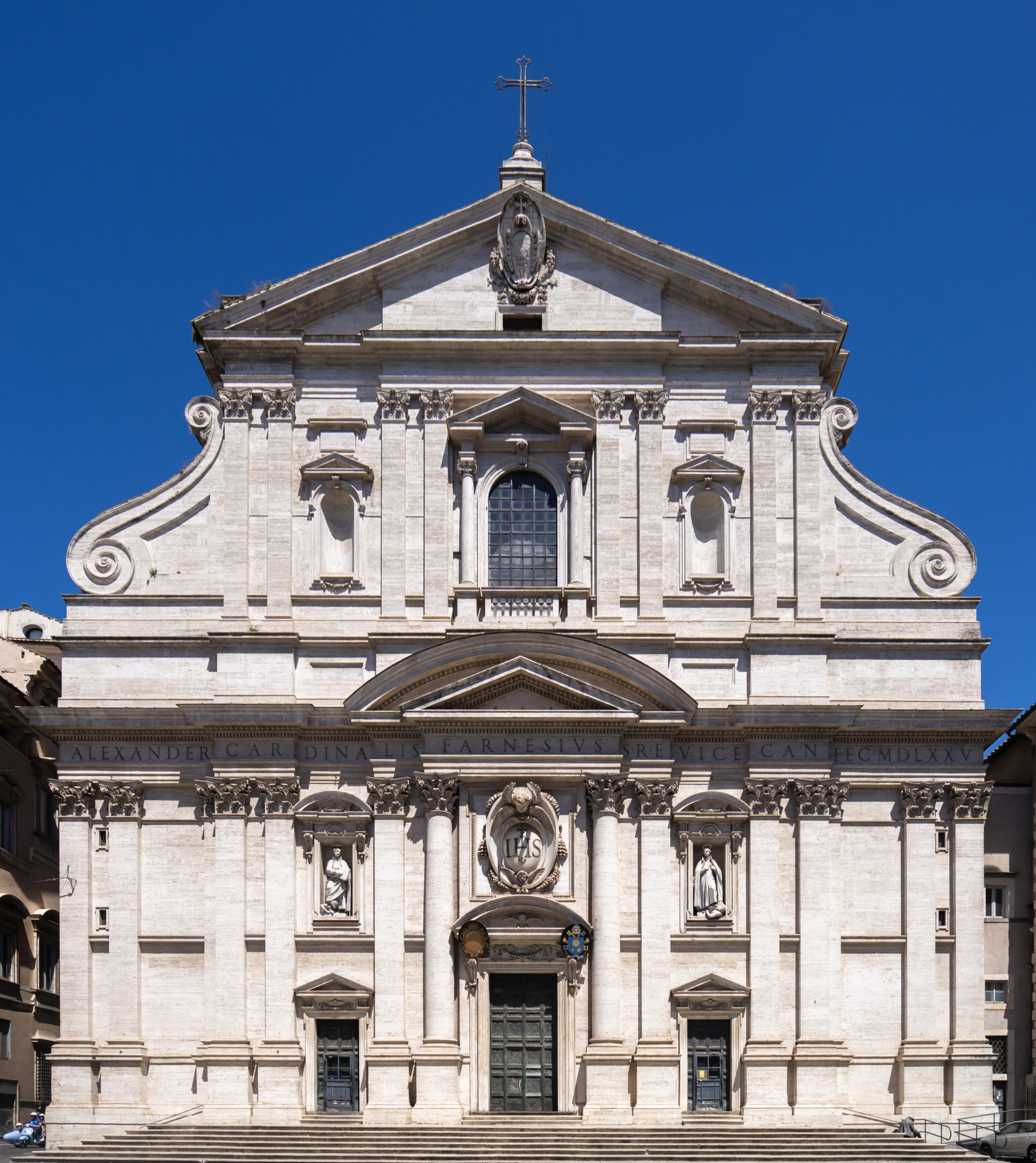
- Giacomo della Porta's façade, precursor of Baroque
- Click on the map for a fullscreen view
- 41°53′45″N 12°28′47″E
- Location: 54 Piazza del Gesu, Rome
- Country: Italy
- Denomination: Catholic Church
- Religious institute: Jesuits
- Website: chiesadelgesu.org

History
- Status: Mother church of the Society of Jesus, titular church
- Dedication: Holy Name of Jesus: Robert Bellarmine; Francis Xavier (right hand)
- Consecrated: 1584

Architecture
- Functional status: Active
- Architects: Giacomo Barozzi da Vignola; Giacomo della Porta
- Style: Mannerist; Baroque (façade)
- Groundbreaking: 1568
- Completed: 1580; 446 years ago

Specifications
- Length: 75 metres (246 ft)
- Width: 35 metres (115 ft)

Administration
- Diocese: Rome

The Church of the Gesù (Italian: Chiesa del Gesù, pronounced [ˈkjɛːza del dʒeˈzu]), officially named Chiesa del Santissimo Nome di Gesù (Note: The name of Chiesa del Sacro Nome di Gesù is also used.) (English: Church of the Most Holy Name of Jesus), is a church located at Piazza del Gesù in the Pigna rione of Rome, Italy. It is the mother church of the Society of Jesus (best known as Jesuits). With its façade, described as "the first truly baroque façade", the church served as a model for innumerable Jesuit churches all over the world, especially in Central Europe and in Portuguese colonies. Its paintings in the nave, crossing, and side chapels became models for art in Jesuit churches throughout Italy and Europe, as well as those of other orders. The Church of the Gesù is one of the great 17th-century preaching churches built by Counter-Reformation orders like the Jesuits in the Centro Storico of Rome – the others being Sant'Ignazio, also of the Jesuits, San Carlo ai Catinari of the Barnabites, Sant'Andrea della Valle of the Theatines, and the Chiesa Nuova of the Oratorians.

First conceived in 1551 by Saint Ignatius of Loyola, the Spanish founder of the Society of Jesus active during the Protestant Reformation and the subsequent Catholic Counter-Reformation, the Gesù was also the home of the Superior General of the Society of Jesus until the wide suppression of the order in 1773. The church having been subsequently regained by the Jesuits, the adjacent palazzo is now a residence for Jesuit scholars from around the world studying at the Gregorian University in preparation for ordination to the priesthood.

== History ==
Although Michelangelo, at the request of the Spanish cardinal Bartolomeo de la Cueva, offered, out of devotion, to design the church for free, the endeavor was funded by Cardinal Alessandro Farnese, grandson of Pope Paul III, the pope who had authorized the founding of the Society of Jesus. Ultimately, the main architects involved in the construction were Giacomo Barozzi da Vignola, architect of the Farnese family, and Giacomo della Porta. The church was built on the same spot as the previous church Santa Maria della Strada, where Saint Ignatius of Loyola had once prayed before an image of the Holy Virgin. This image, now adorned with gems, can be seen in the church in the chapel of Ignatius on the left side of the altar.

Construction of the church began on 26 June 1568 to Vignola's design. Vignola was assisted by the Jesuit Giovanni Tristano, who took over from Vignola in 1571. When he died in 1575 he was succeeded by the Jesuit architect Giovanni de Rosis. Giacomo della Porta was involved in the construction of the cross-vault, dome, and the apse.

The revision of Vignola's façade design by della Porta has offered architectural historians opportunities for a close comparison between Vignola's balanced composition in three superimposed planes and Della Porta's dynamically fused tension bound by its strong vertical elements. Vignola's rejected design remains in an engraving of 1573.

The design of this church set a pattern for Jesuit churches that lasted into the twentieth century; its innovations require enumerating. Aesthetics across the Catholic Church as a whole were strongly influenced by the Council of Trent. Although the Council itself said little about church architecture, its suggestion of simplification prompted Charles Borromeo to reform ecclesiastical building practise. Evidence of attention to his writings can be found at the Gesù. There is no narthex in which to linger: the visitor is projected immediately into the body of the church, a single nave without aisles, so that the congregation is assembled and attention is focused on the high altar. In place of aisles there are a series of identical interconnecting chapels behind arched openings, (Note: The Gesù's scheme of wide-arched bays defined by paired pilasters has its origin in Alberti's Sant'Andrea, Milan, begun in 1470.) to which entrance is controlled by decorative balustrades with gates. Transepts are reduced to stubs that emphasize the altars of their end walls.

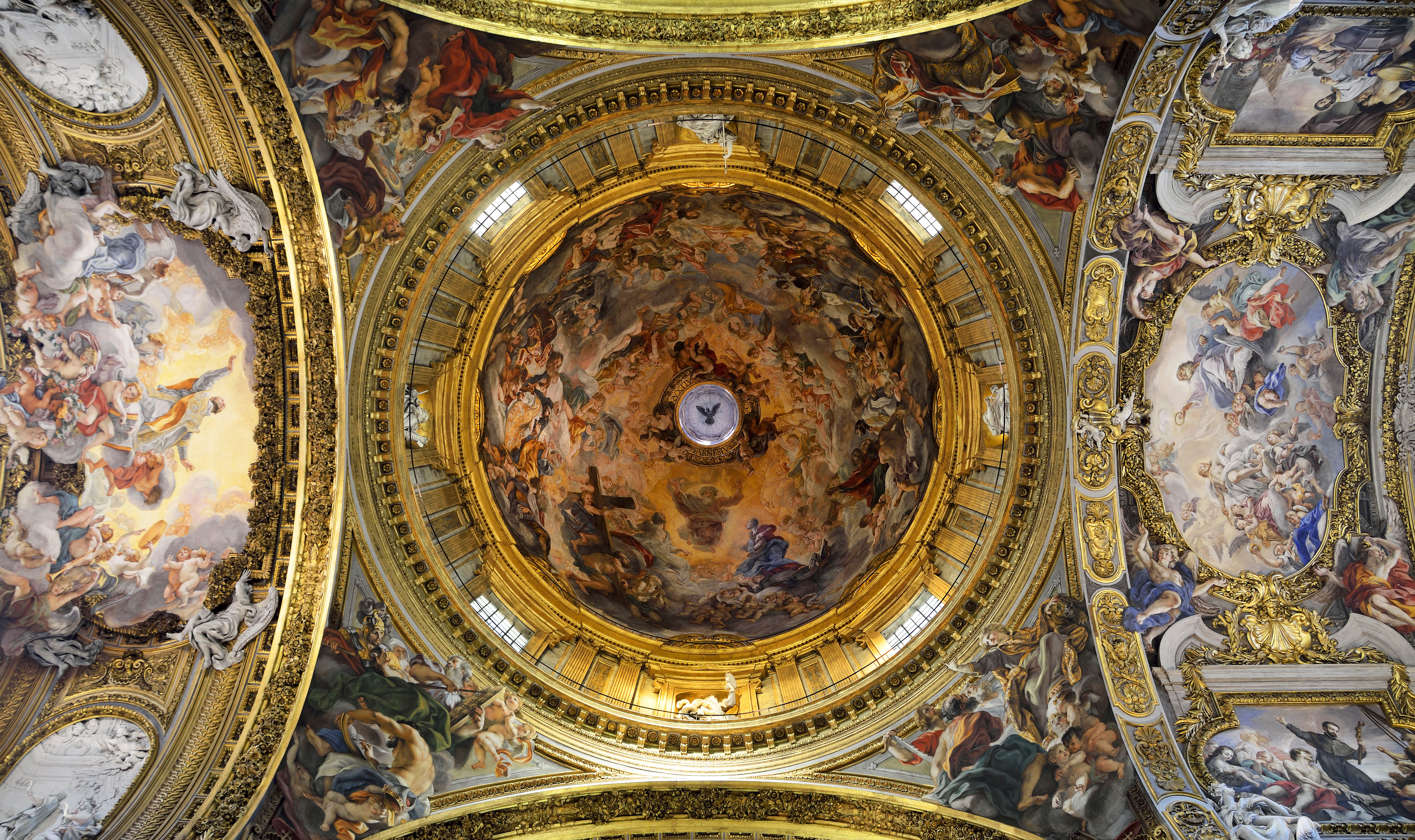
Dome

The plan synthesizes the central planning of the High Renaissance, (Note: The exemplar is Bramante's original plan for St. Peter's Basilica.) expressed by the grand scale of the dome and the prominent piers of the crossing, with the extended nave that had been characteristic of the preaching churches, a type of church established by Franciscans and Dominicans since the thirteenth century. The Jesuits relied heavily on the acoustics of the church; they wanted the faithful to clearly hear the words of the sermon. This is why the church was constructed with a single nave, and a dome at the nave, transept intersection.

Everywhere inlaid polychrome marble revetments are relieved by gilding, frescoed barrel vaults enrich the ceiling and rhetorical white stucco and marble sculptures break out of their tectonic framing. The example of the Gesù did not eliminate the traditional basilica church with aisles, but after its example was set, experiments in Baroque church floor plans, oval or Greek cross, were largely confined to smaller churches and chapels.

The church was consecrated by Cardinal Giulio Antonio Santorio, the delegate of pope Gregory XIII, on 25 November 1584.

== Façade ==
The façade of the church was modified and done later by Giacomo Della Porta. We can see two main sections which are decorated with acanthus leaves on pilasters and column capitals. The lower section is divided by six pairs of pilasters (with a mix of columns and pilasters framing the main door). The main door is well decorated with low relief, the papal coat of arms, and a shield with the initialism SPQR, tying this church closely to the people of Rome. The main door stands under a curvilinear tympanum and over it a large medallion with the letters IHS representing the Christogram and an angel. The letters IHS are the Latin form of the first three letters of the Greek spelling of the name Jesus, indicative of both the central figure of Christianity and the Jesuit's formal name, Society of Jesus.

The two other doors have triangle pediments, and in the higher part of this first level, two statues are set in the alignment of each of these doors. A statue of St Francis Xavier stands on the right of the façade. His left foot on a human body. On the other side stands a statue of St Ignatius of loyola.

The upper section is divided with four pairs of pilasters and no statues. Upper and lower sections are joined by a volute on each side.

== Interior decoration ==
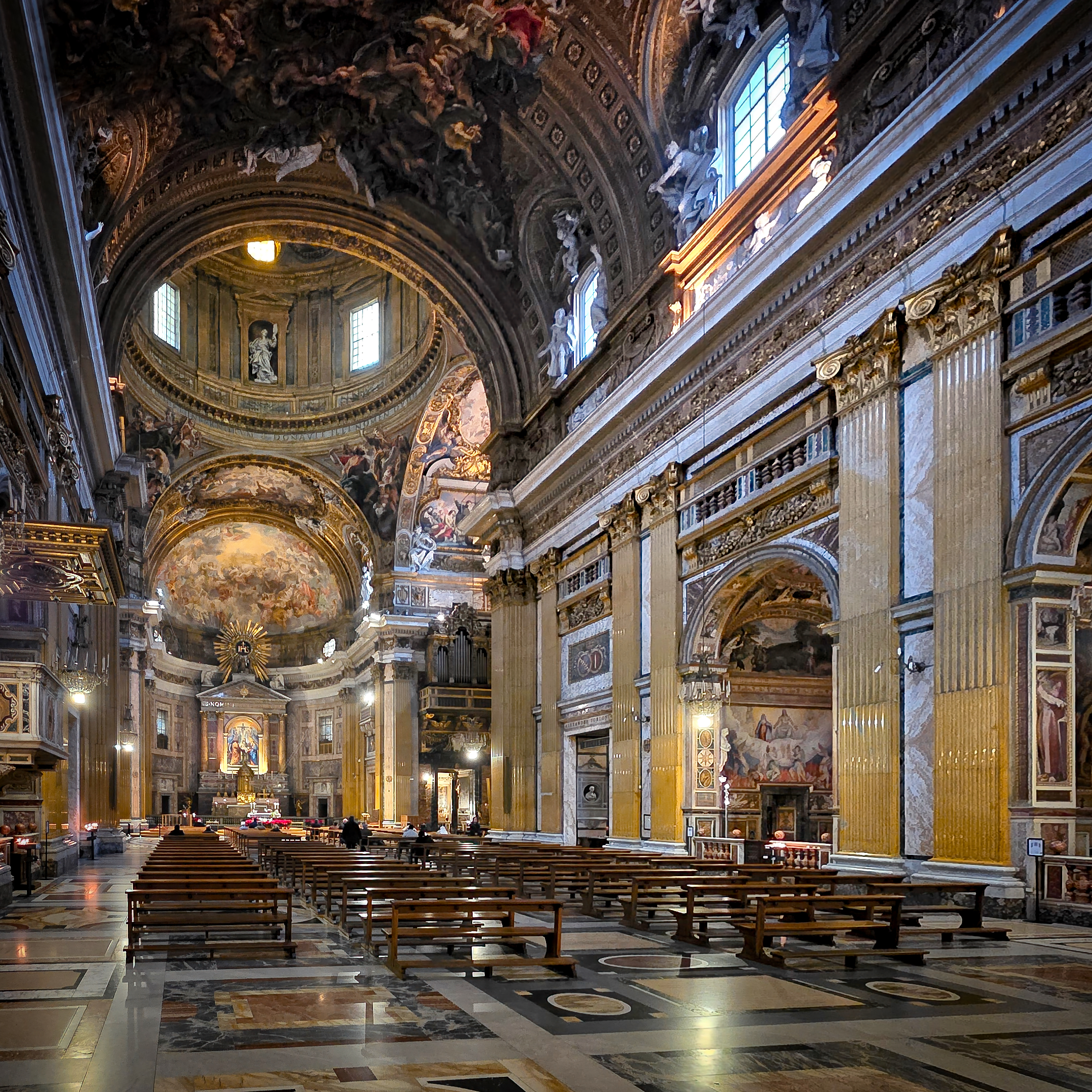
Nave

The first high altar is believed to have been designed by Giacomo della Porta. It was removed during the renovations in the 19th century and its tabernacle was subsequently purchased by archbishop Patrick Leahy for his new cathedral where it was installed after some minor modifications.

The present high altar, designed by Antonio Sarti (1797–1880), was constructed towards the middle of the 19th century. It is dominated by four columns under a neo-classical pediment. Sarti also covered the apse with marble and made the drawings of the tabernacle. The angels surrounding the IHS aureole were sculpted by Rinaldo Rinaldi (1793–1873). The two angels kneeling at each side of the aureole are the work of Francesco Benaglia and Filippo Gnaccarini (1804–1875). The altarpiece, representing the Circumcision of Jesus, was painted by Alessandro Capalti (1810–1868). The ceiling of the apse is adorned by the painting Glory of the Mystical Lamb by Baciccia (Giovanni Battista Gaulli).

The most striking feature of the interior decoration is the ceiling fresco, the grandiose Triumph of the Name of Jesus (1678-1679) by Giovanni Battista Gaulli. Gaulli also frescoed the cupola, including lantern and pendentives, central vault, window recesses, and transepts' ceilings.

The first chapel to the right of the nave is the Cappella di Sant'Andrea, so named because the church previously on the site, which had to be demolished to make way for the Jesuit church, was dedicated to St. Andrew. All the painted works were completed by the Florentine Agostino Ciampelli. The frescoes on the arches depict the male martyrs saints Pancrazio, Celso, Vito, and Agapito, while the pilasters depict the female martyred saints Cristina, Margherita, Anastasia, Cecilia, Lucy, and Agatha. The ceiling is frescoed with the Glory of the Virgin surrounded by martyred saints Clemente, Ignazio di Antiochia, Cipriano, and Policarpo. The lunettes are frescoed with Saints Agnes & Lucy face the storm and St. Stephen and the Deacon St. Lawrence. The altarpiece depicts the Martyrdom of St Andrew.

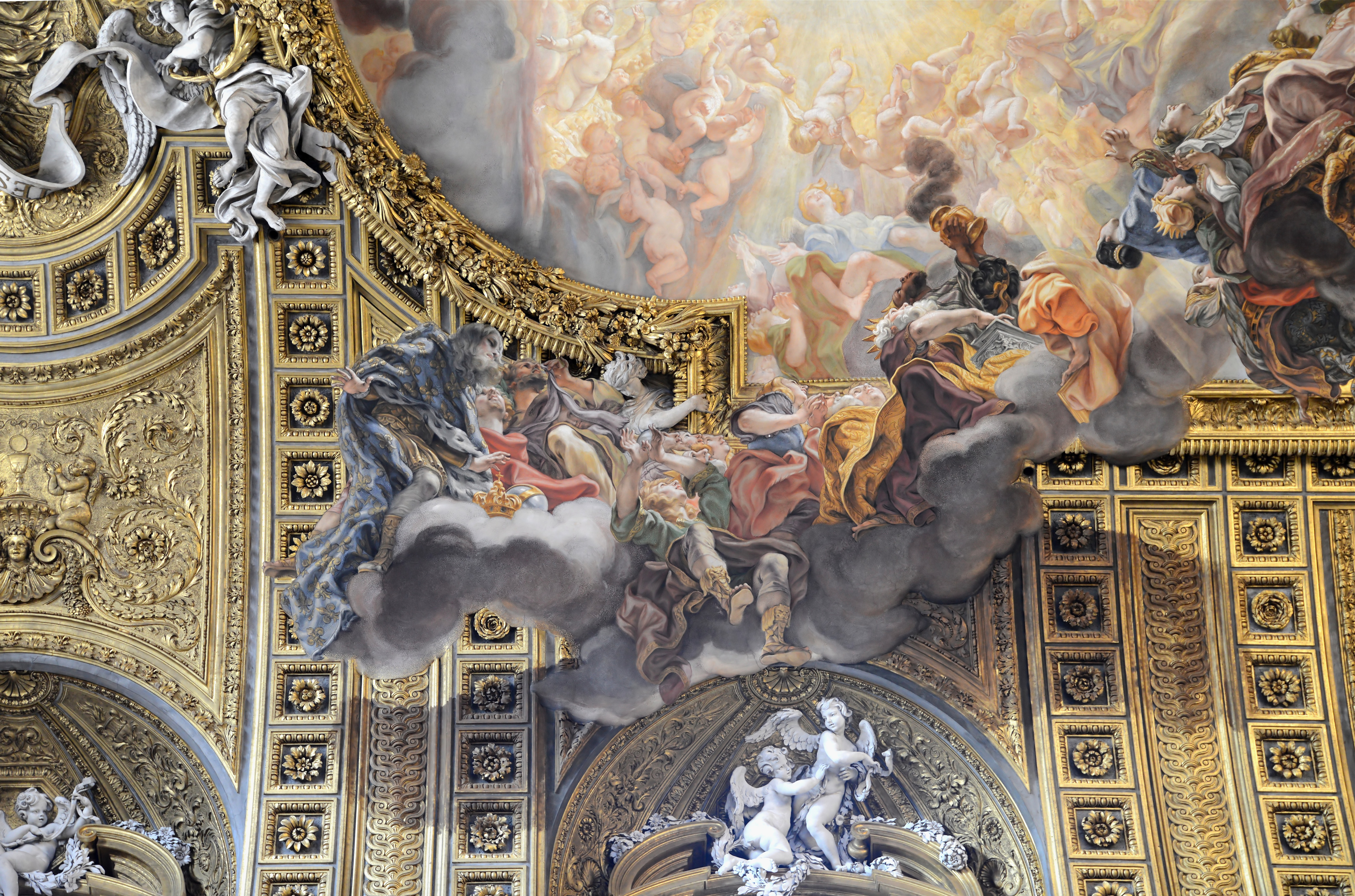
Detail of ceiling showing the trompe l'oeil effect

The second chapel to the right is the Cappella della Passione, with lunette frescoes depicting scenes of the Passion: Jesus in Gethsemane, Kiss of Judas, and six canvases on the pilasters: Christ at the column Christ before the guards, Christ before Herod, Ecce Homo, Exit to Calvary, and Crucifixion. The altarpiece of the Madonna with child and beatified Jesuits replaces the original altarpiece by Scipione Pulzone. (Note: Now in the Metropolitan Museum of New York) The program of paintings is indebted to Giuseppe Valeriano and painted by Gaspare Celio. The altar has a bronze urn with the remains of 18th century Jesuit St. Giuseppe Pignatelli, canonized by Pius XII in 1954. Medals on the wall commemorate P. Jan Roothaan (1785–1853) and P. Pedro Arrupe (1907–1991), the 21st and 28th Superior General of the Society of Jesus.

The third chapel to the right is the Cappella degli Angeli, which has a ceiling fresco of the Coronation of the Virgin and the altarpiece of Angels worshiping the Trinity by Federico Zuccari. He also painted the canvases on the walls, Defeat of the rebel angels on right, and Angels liberate souls from Purgatory on the left. Other frescoes represent Heaven, Hell, and Purgatory. The angles in the niches of the pilasters were completed by both Silla Longhi and Flaminio Vacca.

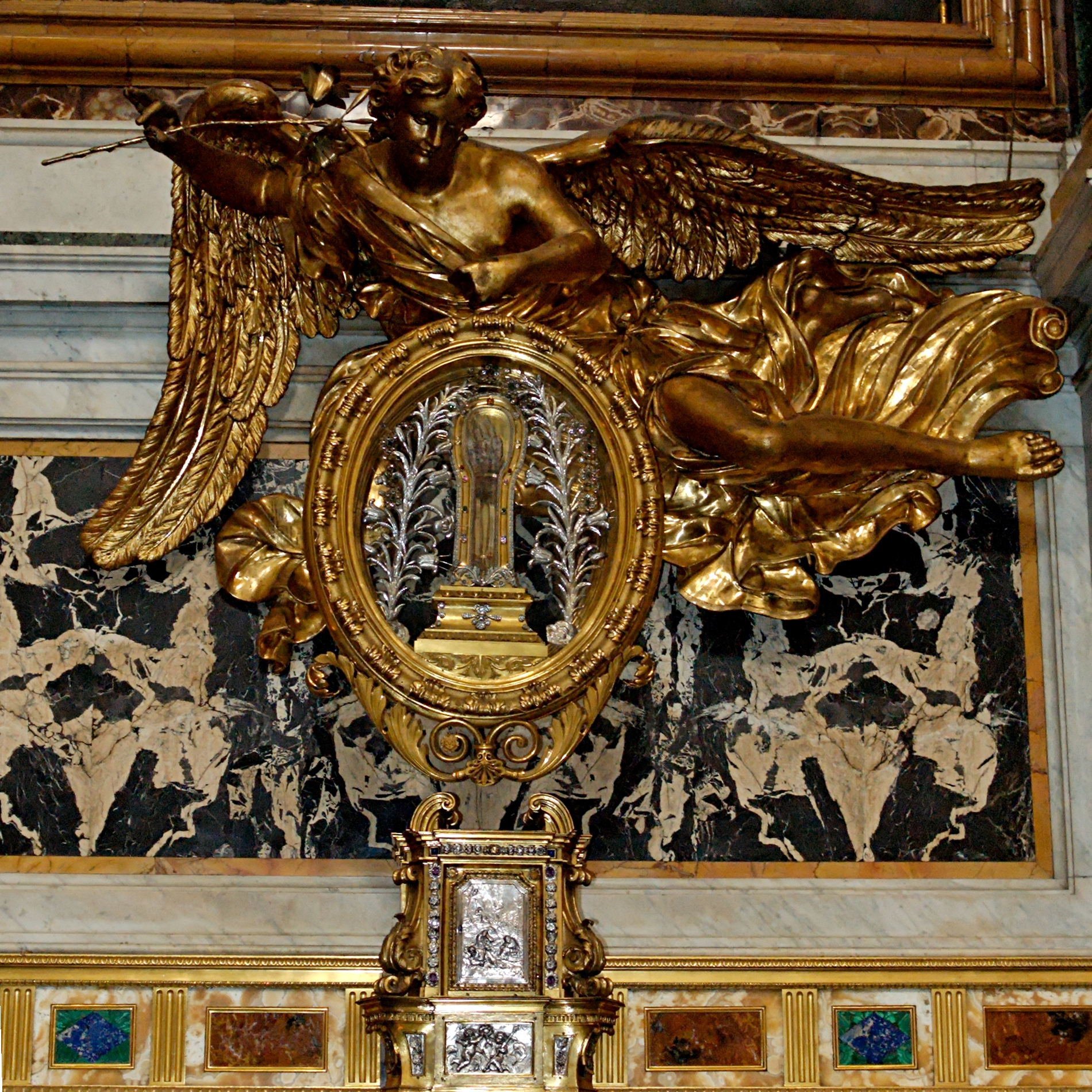
Saint Francis Xavier Chapel altar

The larger Saint Francis Xavier Chapel, in the right transept, was designed by Pietro da Cortona, originally commissioned by Cardinal Giovanni Francesco Negroni. The polychromatic marbles enclose a stucco relief representing Francis Xavier welcomed to heaven by angels. The altarpiece shows the Death of Francis Xavier in Shangchuan Island by Carlo Maratta. The arches are decorated with scenes from the life of the saint, including Apotheosis of the saint in the center, Crucifixion, Saint lost at sea, and at left, Baptism of an Indian princess, by Giovanni Andrea Carlone. The silver reliquary conserves part of the saint's right arm (by which he baptized 300,000 people), his other remains are interred in the Jesuit church in Goa.

The last chapel on the far end of the nave, to the right of the high altar, is the chapel of the Sacro Cuore (Sacred Heart of Jesus), and contains the famous Sacred Heart of Jesus painting by Pompeo Batoni.

The sacristy is on the right. In the presbytery is a bust of Cardinal Robert Bellarmine by Bernini. The sculptor prayed daily in the church.

The first chapel to the left, originally dedicated to the apostles, is now the Cappella di San Francesco Borgia, the former Spanish Duke of Gandia, who renounced his title to enter the Jesuit order, and become its third "Preposito generale". The altarpiece, Saint Francesco Borgia in Prayer by Pozzo, is surrounded by works by Gagliardi. Ceiling frescoes of (Pentecost) and lunettes (left Martyrdom of St. Peter, to sides Faith and Hope, and right Martyrdom of St. Paul) with allegorical Religion and Charity are works of Nicolò Circignani (Il Pomarancio). Pier Francesco Mola painted the walls, on left with St. Peter in jail baptizes saints Processo & Martiniano, to right is the Conversion of St. Paul. There are four monuments by Marchesi Ferrari.

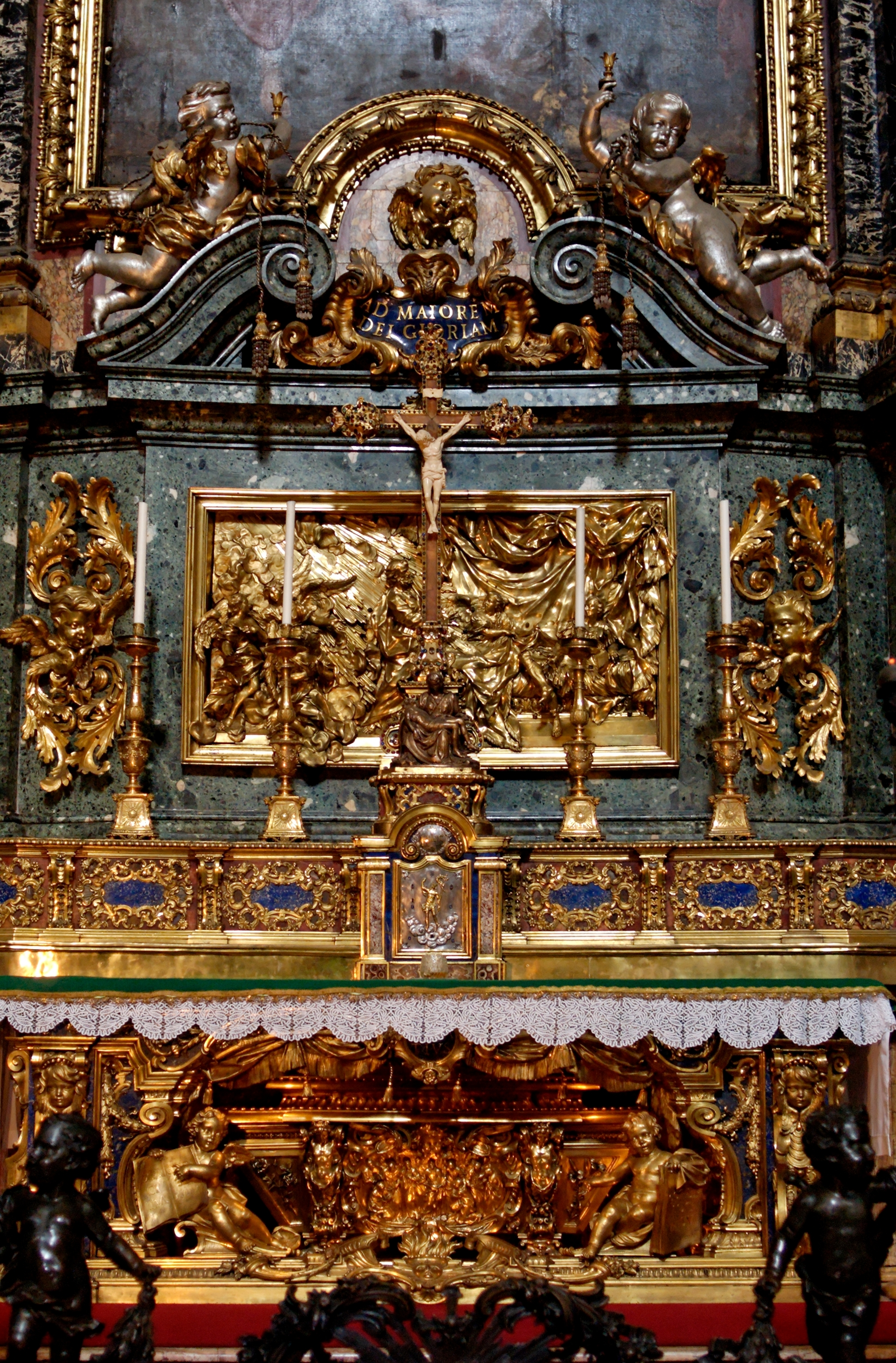
St. Ignatius Chapel altar

The second chapel on the left is dedicated to the Nativity and called Cappella della Sacra Famiglia, commissioned by patron Cardinal Cerri who worked for the Barberini family. The altarpiece of the nativity is by Circignani. In the roof, the Celestial celebration on the nativity of Christ, on the pinnacles are David, Isaiah, Zechariah and Baruch, on the right lunette an Annunciation to the Shepherds, and on the left a Massacre of the Innocents. Also are frescoes on Presentation of Jesus to the Temple and Adoration by Magi. Four allegorical statues represent Temperance, Prudence on right; and Fortitude and Justice.

The third chapel to the left is the Cappella della Santissima Trinità, commissioned initially by the clerical patron Pirro Taro, named due to the main altarpiece by Francesco Bassano the Younger. The frescoes were completed mainly by three painters and assistants during 1588–1589; the exact attributions are uncertain, but it is said the Creation, the angels on the pilasters, and the designs of some of the frescoes are by the Florentine Jesuit painter, Giovanni Battista Fiammeri. Painted with assistants was the Baptism of Christ on the right wall. The Transfiguration on the left wall and the Abraham with three angels on the right oval were by Durante Alberti. God the Father behind a chorus of angels in the left oval and in the pinnacles angels with God's attributes were completed by Ventura Salimbeni. The reliquary on the altar holds the right arm of the polish Jesuit St. Andrew Bobola, martyred in 1657 and canonized by Pius XI in 1938.

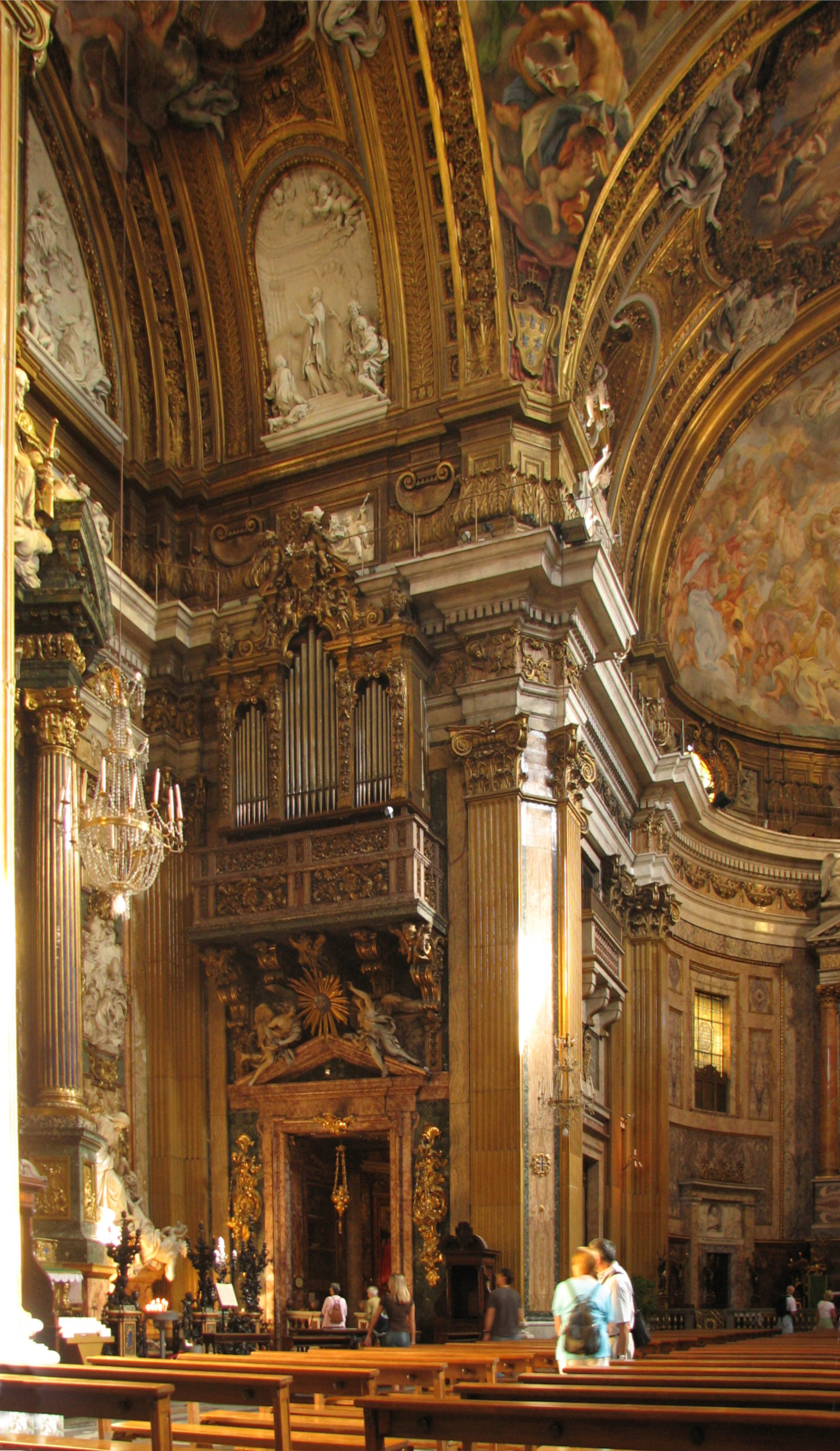
Chapel of Madonna della Strada

The imposing and luxurious St. Ignatius Chapel with the saint's tomb is located on the left side of the transept and is the church's masterpiece, designed by Andrea Pozzo between 1696 and 1700. The altar by Pozzo shows the Trinity on top of a globe. The lapis lazuli, representing the Earth, was thought to be the largest piece in the world but is actually mortar decorated with lapis lazuli. The four lapis lazuli-veneered columns enclose the colossal statue of the saint by Pierre Legros. The latter is a copy, probably by Adamo Tadolini working in the studio of Antonio Canova. Pope Pius VI had the original silver statue melted down, ostensibly to pay the war reparations to Napoleon, as established by the Treaty of Tolentino, 1797.

Originally the project was designed by Giacomo della Porta, then by Cortona; but ultimately Pozzo won a public contest to design the altar. A canvas of the Saint receives the monogram with the name of Jesus from the celestial resurrected Christ attributed to Pozzo. The urn of St. Ignatius is a bronze urn by Algardi that holds the body of the saint; below are two groups of statues where Religion defeats heresy by Legros (with a putto – on the left side – tearing pages from heretical books by Luther, Calvin and Zwingli), and Faith defeats idolatry by Jean-Baptiste Théodon.

The St. Ignatius Chapel also hosts the restored macchina barocca or baroque machine of Andrea Pozzo. During daytime the statue of St. Ignatius is hidden behind a large painting, but every day at 17.30 triumphal music is played and the painting is lowered by the machine into the altar, revealing the statue, with spotlights used to highlight various aspects of the Ignatian Altar, while describing aspects of the history and spirituality of the Society of Jesus.

The last chapel on the far end of the nave, to the left of the high altar, is the Chapel of the Madonna della Strada. The name derives from a medieval icon, once found in a now-lost Church in the piazza Altieri, venerated by Saint Ignatius. The interior is designed and decorated by Giuseppe Valeriani, who painted scenes from the life of the Virgin. The cupola frescoes were painted by G.P. Pozzi. The painting depicting the death of Saint John Francis Regis by Jacopo Zoboli is located in the sacristy rooms.

The pipe organ was built by the Italian firm, Tamburini. It is a large, three manual instrument with 5 divisions (pedal, choir, great, swell, and antiphonal). The swell and choir are enclosed. The pipes are split into three separate locations within the church. Two ornamented façades flank the transept walls (Swell and Great on the left and Choir and Pedal on the right) and a small antiphonal division is located above the liturgical west entrance.

== Influence ==
The Church of the Gesù was the model of numerous churches of the Society of Jesus throughout the world, starting from the Church of St. Michael in Munich (1583–1597), the Corpus Christi Church in Nyasvizh (1587–1593), the Saints Peter and Paul Church, Kraków (1597–1619), the Cathedral of Córdoba (Argentina) (1582–1787) as well as the Church of St. Ignatius of Loyola in Buenos Aires (1710–1722), the Church of Saints Peter and Paul in Tbilisi (1870–1877), and the Church of the Gesù in Philadelphia (1879–1888). Various parishes also share the name of the Church of the Gesù in Rome.

== Cardinal-deacons ==
In 1965, the Church of the Gesù was made a titular church, to be held by a cardinal-deacon.

- Michele Pellegrino, cardinal-priest pro illa vice (1967–1986)
- Eduardo Martínez Somalo (1988–2021; elevated to cardinal-priest pro illa vice in 1999)
- Gianfranco Ghirlanda (2022–present)

== Gallery ==
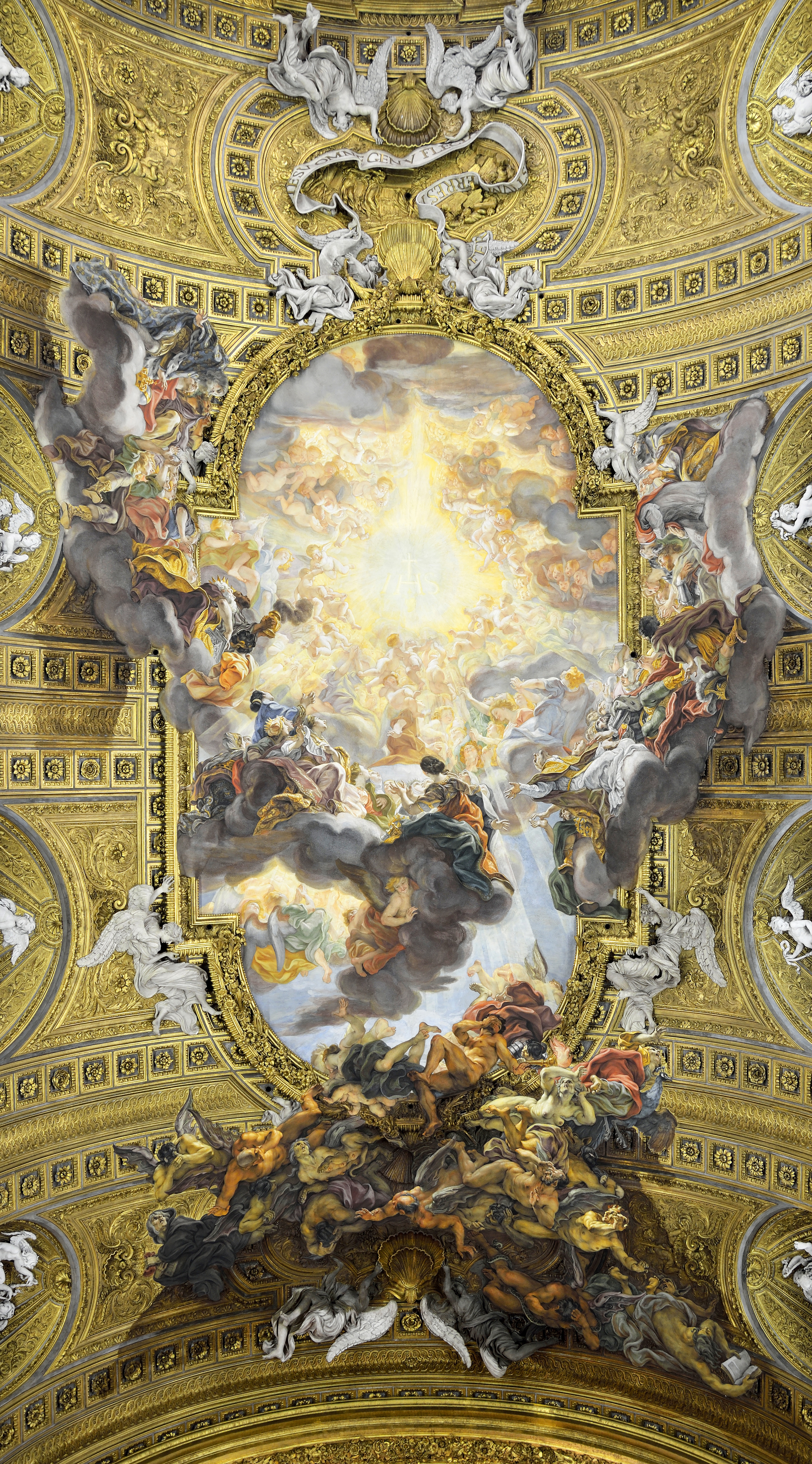
Triumph of the Name of Jesus by Giovanni Battista Gaulli

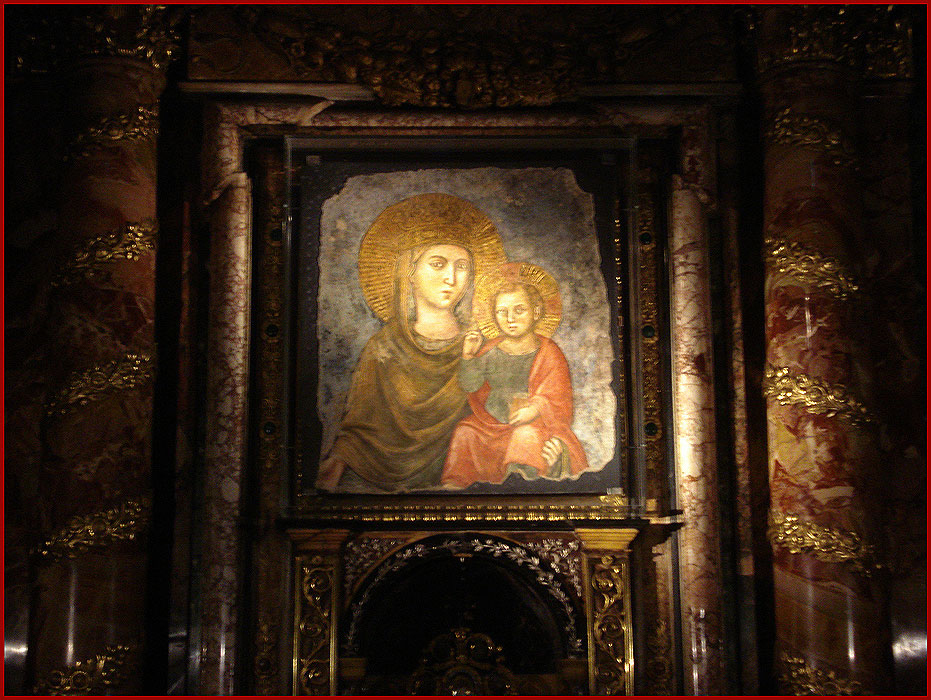
Madonna Della Strada

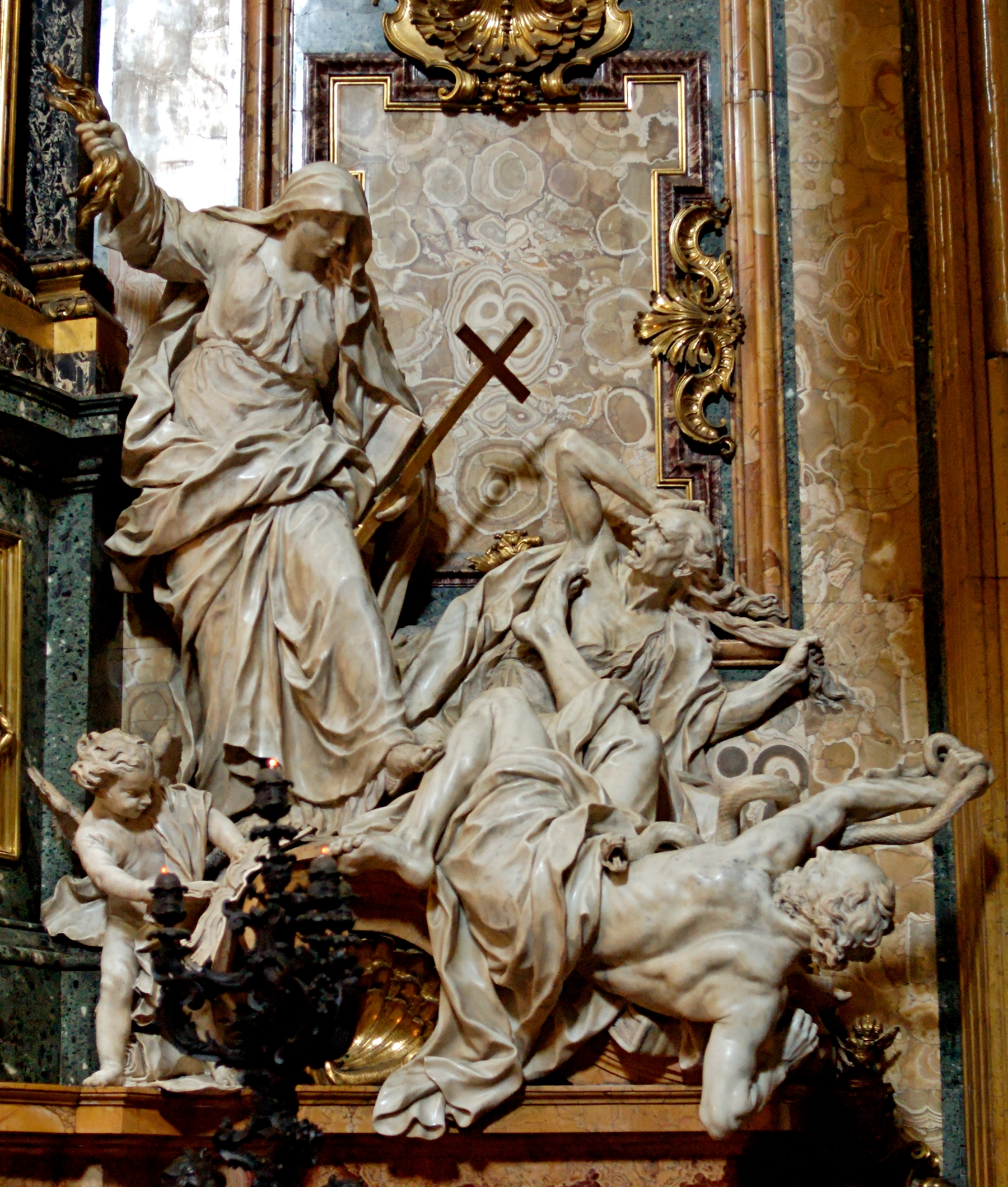
Religion Overthrowing Heresy and Hatred by Legros

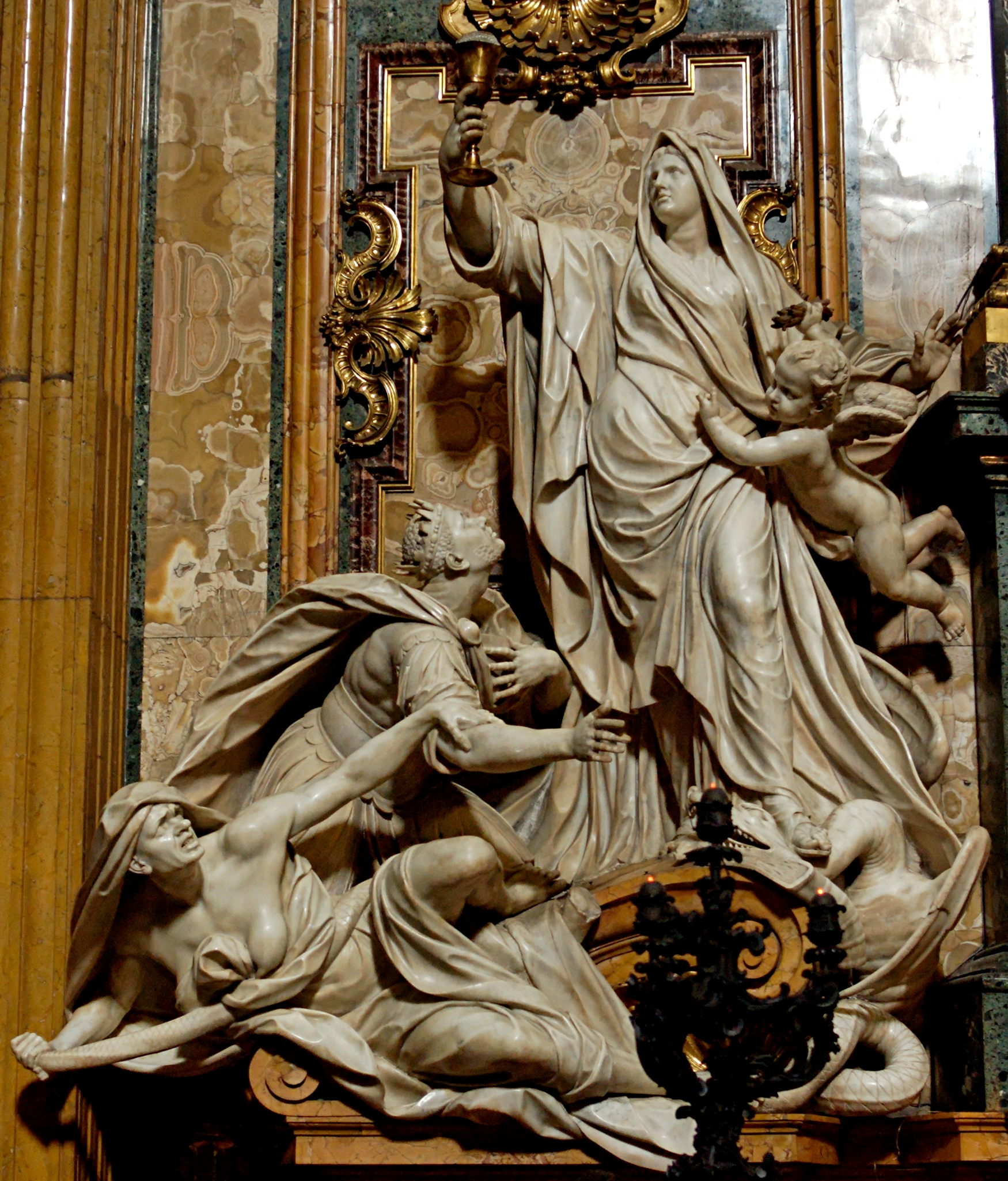
Triumph of Faith over Idolatry by Theodon

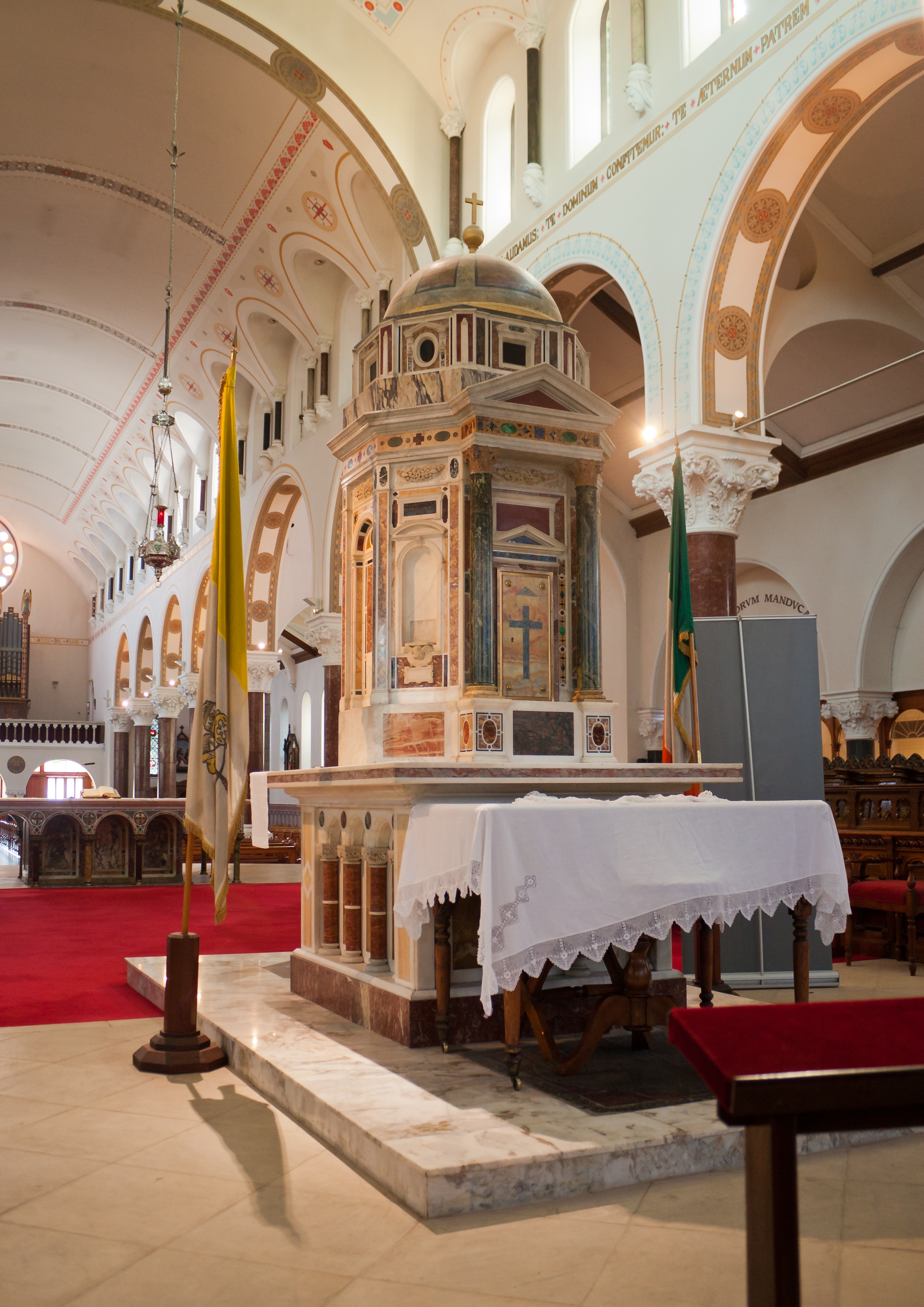
Original 16th-century tabernacle, moved to Thurles in Ireland

== See also ==
- Church of the Gesu (Frascati)
- 16th-century Western domes
- List of Jesuit sites
