= Piazza del Gesù =

Square in Rome, Italy

- Square
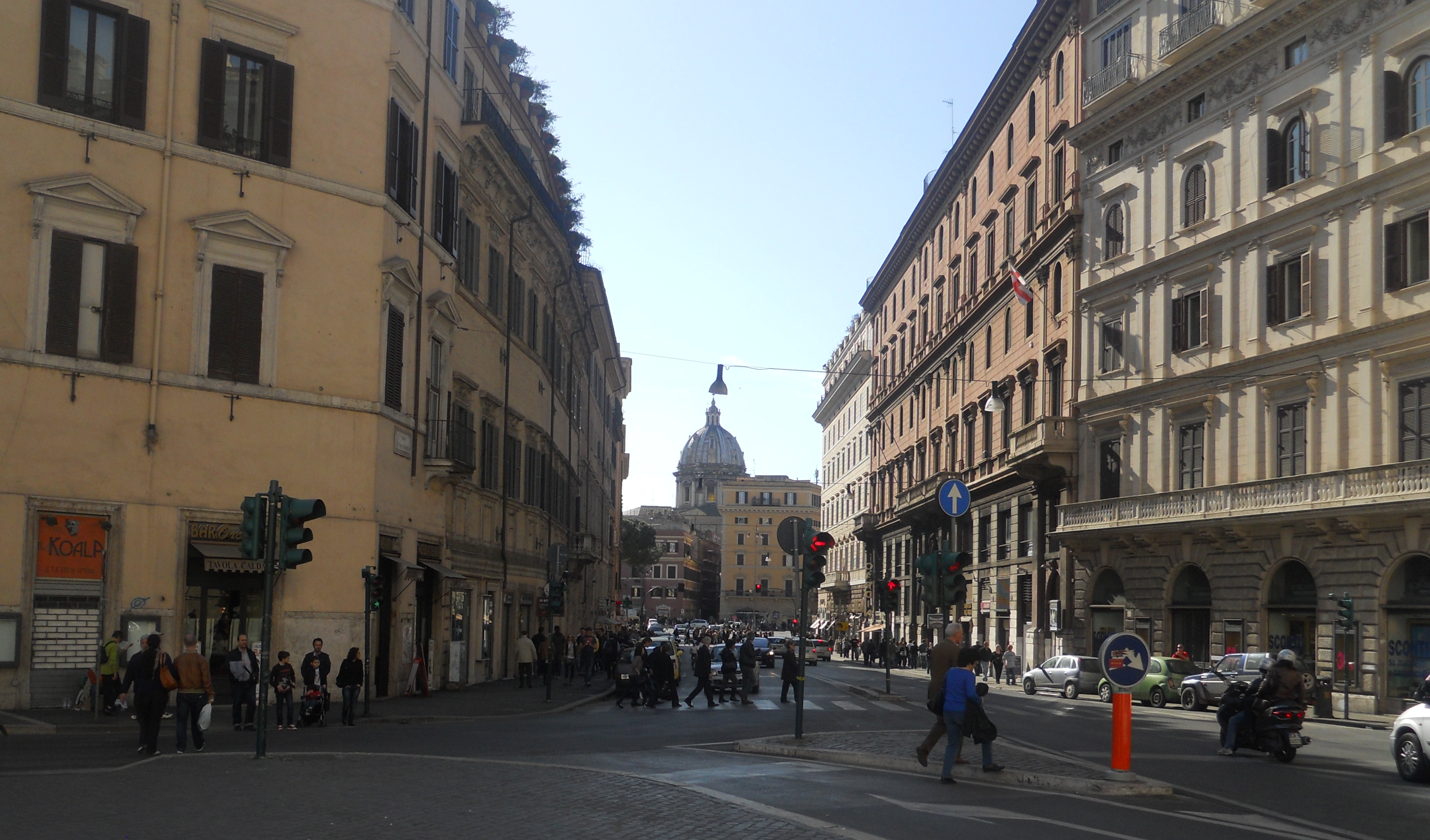
- Location: Rome, Italy
- Interactive map of Piazza del Gesù

Piazza del Gesù is a square outside the Church of the Gesù, in the Pigna rione of Rome, Italy.
