= Giuseppe Valeriano =

Italian painter and architect

Giuseppe Valeriano (L'Aquila, August, 1542 – Naples, 15 July 1596) was an Italian painter and architect, priest of the Jesuit order, and active in Rome, Spain, and Naples.

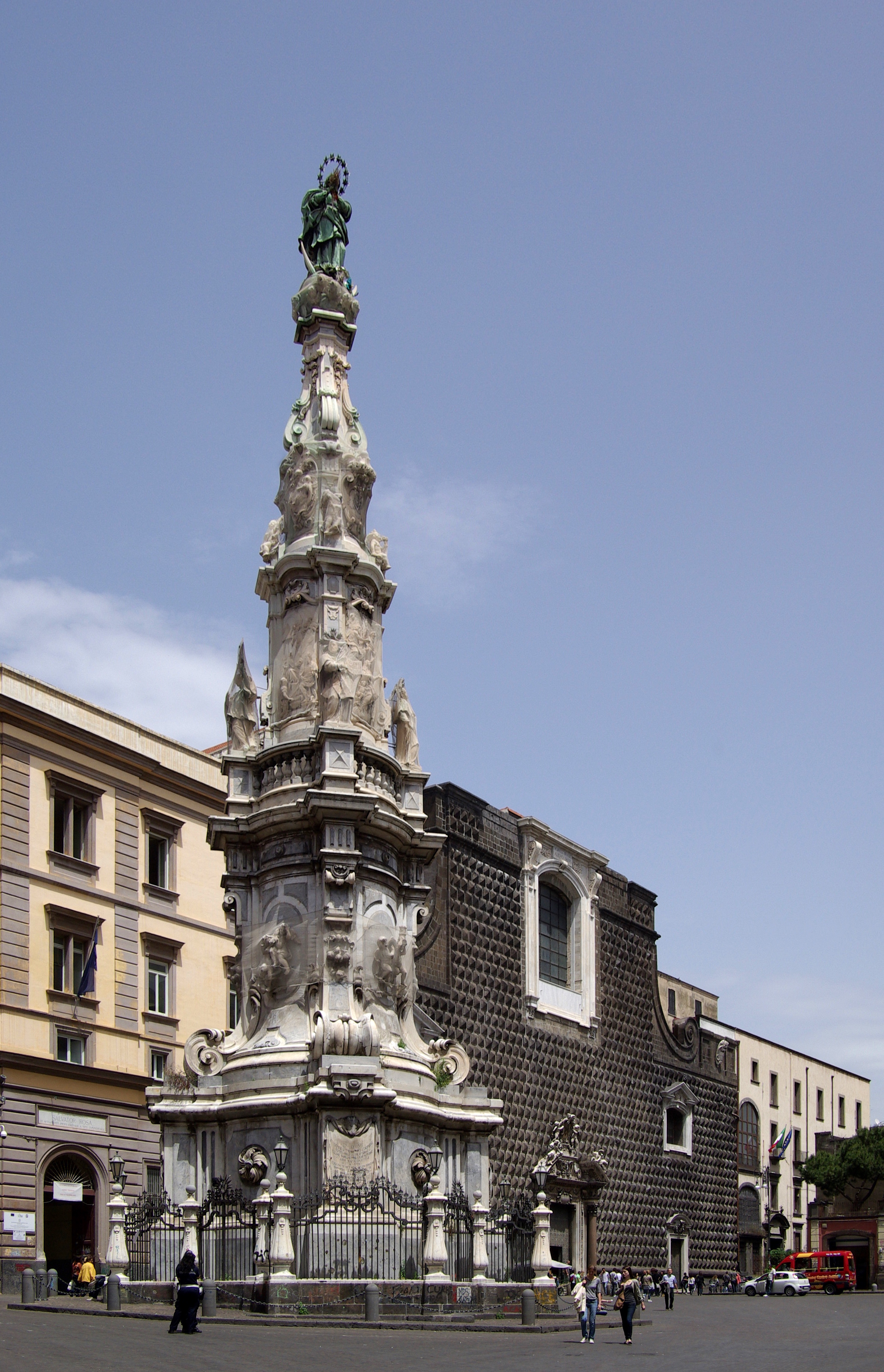
Facade of Gesù Nuovo, Naples.

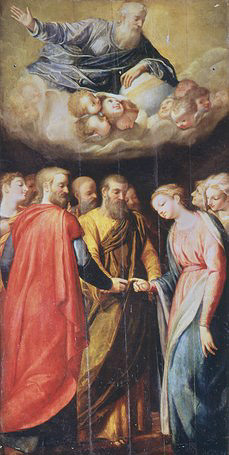
Marriage of the Virgin, Santo Spirito, Sassia.

== Biography ==
He began training in his native town under a minor painter named Pompeo Cesura, but by 1560 he was in Rome, and collaborated on the decoration of the Cappella dell'Ascensione in the church of Santo Spirito in Sassia. He also painted an altarpiece of the Glory of Christ (c. 1570), in which he shows the influence of Mannerist painters such as Sebastiano del Piombo and Pellegrino Tibaldi.

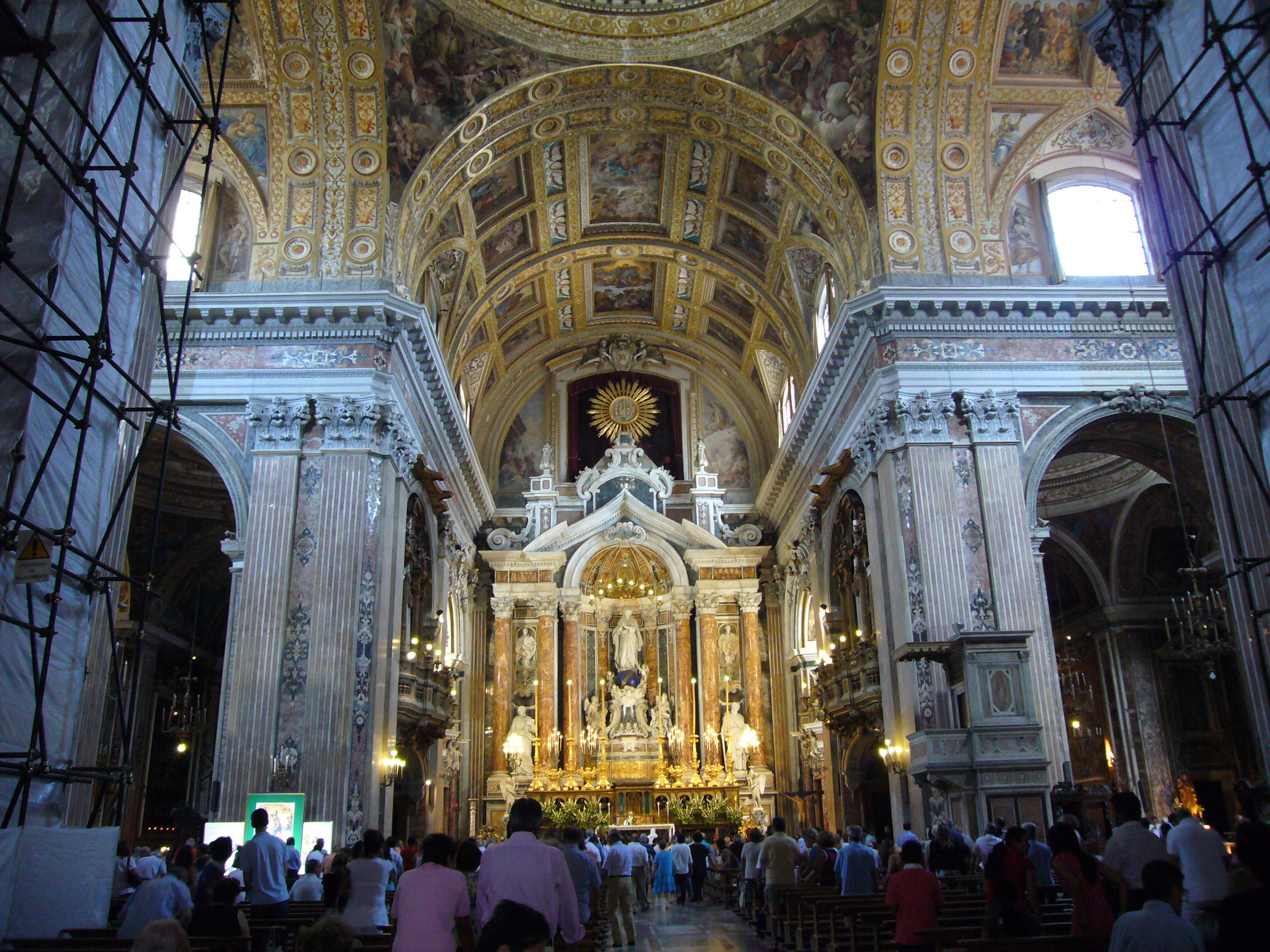
Interior of Gesù Nuovo, Naples.

Valeriano's work as an architect had greater impact than as a painter. In 1573, Valeriano travels to Spain, and by the next year he had joined the Jesuits. For this order, he helped design the church of Villagarcía de Campos, and worked on other projects in Seville, Granada, Córdoba, Málaga, and Trigueros. By way of Portugal, he returns to Italy in 1580, and helps design, in collaboration with Giacomo della Porta, the Collegio Romano, sometimes attributed to Bartolomeo Ammanati. In Rome, he collaborates with Scipione Pulzone and Gaspare Celio respectively in designing the decoration of the Chapels of Strada (1588) and Passion (c. 1590) in the church of the Gesù.

In 1584, he completed designs for a building of the Collegio Massimo (now University of Naples), and began work on his masterpiece, the church of Gesù Nuovo. This Jesuit church was built into what had been a fortified family palace in central Naples. Valeriano also designed the posterior part (1589) of the church of Gesù in Genoa. He also provided plans for the order's Michaelskirche (1591) in Munich, though it is unclear how much influence they had in that construction. He also contributed plans for buildings in Lisbon, Malta, L'Aquila, Marseille, and Palermo (1592). It is impossible for him to have traveled to all these places in such short a span, and likely submitted plans "site unseen", which fits in with the Jesuit vision of itself as an international, homogenizing order for the apostolic spread of a unitary post-Tridentine Catholic faith.

== Bibliography ==
- Baglione, Giovanni (1733) [1641]. Le Vite de' Pittori, Scultori, Architetti, ed Intagliatori dal Pontificato di Gregorio XII del 1572. fino a' tempi de Papa Urbano VIII. nel 1642 [Lives of the painters, sculptors, architects, and engravers during the papacies of Gregory XII in 1572 to Urban VIII in 1642]. Naples: Giovanni Battista Passari. p. 78.
- Dizionario degli architetti, scultori, pittori: intagliatori in ..., Volumes 3, 1823, Milan, Stefano Ticozzi, Page 445=446 * Sydney Joseph Freedberg (1978). Pintura en Italia, 1500–1600. Editorial Cátedra, Madrid. ISBN 84-376-0153-3, pages 659–661.
- The Grove Dictionary of Art, Macmillan Publishers (2000).
- Gauvin A. Bailey, Between Renaissance and Baroque: Jesuit art in Rome, 1565–1610, University of Toronto Press (2003) ISBN 0-8020-3721-6
