= François-Xavier Dumortier =

The Reverend François-Xavier Dumortier SJ
- Born: 4 November 1948 (age 77); Levroux, Indre, France

Ecclesiastical career
- Church: Roman Catholic Church
- Ordained: 1982
- Offices held: Superior of the French province of the Society of Jesus; 2003–2009 — Rector of the Pontifical Gregorian University (2010-2016)

François-Xavier Dumortier, S.J. (born 4 November 1948) is a French Catholic priest and member of the Jesuits. He was rector of the Pontifical Gregorian University in Rome from 1 September 2010 to 1 September 2016, when he was succeeded by Nuno da Silva Gonçalves.

== Biography ==
François-Xavier Dumortier was born on 4 November 1948 in Levroux, France, and entered the Society of Jesus at the age of 25. He was ordained as a priest in 1982, and made his final vows as a Jesuit in 1990.

Dumortier was a philosophy professor for twenty years; he taught in particular at the Centre Sèvres, the Jesuit faculty of philosophy and theology in France. He was rector of that faculty from 1997 to 2003. Afterwards, Dumortier was superior of the French province of the Society of Jesus until 2009.

On 27 April 2010, Pope Benedict XVI announced that the rector of the Pontifical Gregorian University, the Rev. Gianfranco Ghirlanda, S.J., would be succeeded by Father Dumortier as the next rector of the university. The appointment took effect on 1 September 2010.

Pope Francis named Dumortier to participate in the Synod of Bishops on the Family in October 2015.

Preceded by Gianfranco Ghirlanda, S.J.	Rector of the Pontifical Gregorian University; 2010 – September 2016	Succeeded by Nuno da Silva Gonçalves, S.J.
