= Franco Imoda =

The Reverend Dr. Franco Imoda SJ

Rector of the Pontifical Gregorian University
- In office 1998–2004

Personal details
- Born: 02/14/1937? Turin

Franco Imoda, S.J. is an Italian Jesuit priest, who served as Rector of the Pontifical Gregorian University in Rome from 1998 to 2004.

Imoda was born in Turin. Before his appointment as the rector of the Pontifical Gregorian University, he had been a professor in the Institute of Psychology of that university since 1971. He studied philosophy at Vals-près-le-Puy in France, and theology at Chieri, near Turin. Imoda obtained a doctorate in clinical psychology at the University of Chicago, and finished his training at the Illinois State Psychiatric Institute and the Psychosomatic and Psychiatric Institute of the Michael Reese Hospital at Chicago.

Preceded by	Rector of the Pontifical Gregorian University; 1998–2004	Succeeded by Gianfranco Ghirlanda, S.J.
