= Gianfranco Ghirlanda =

Italian Catholic cardinal (born 1942)

His Eminence Gianfranco Ghirlanda SJ
- Patron of the Sovereign Military Order of Malta
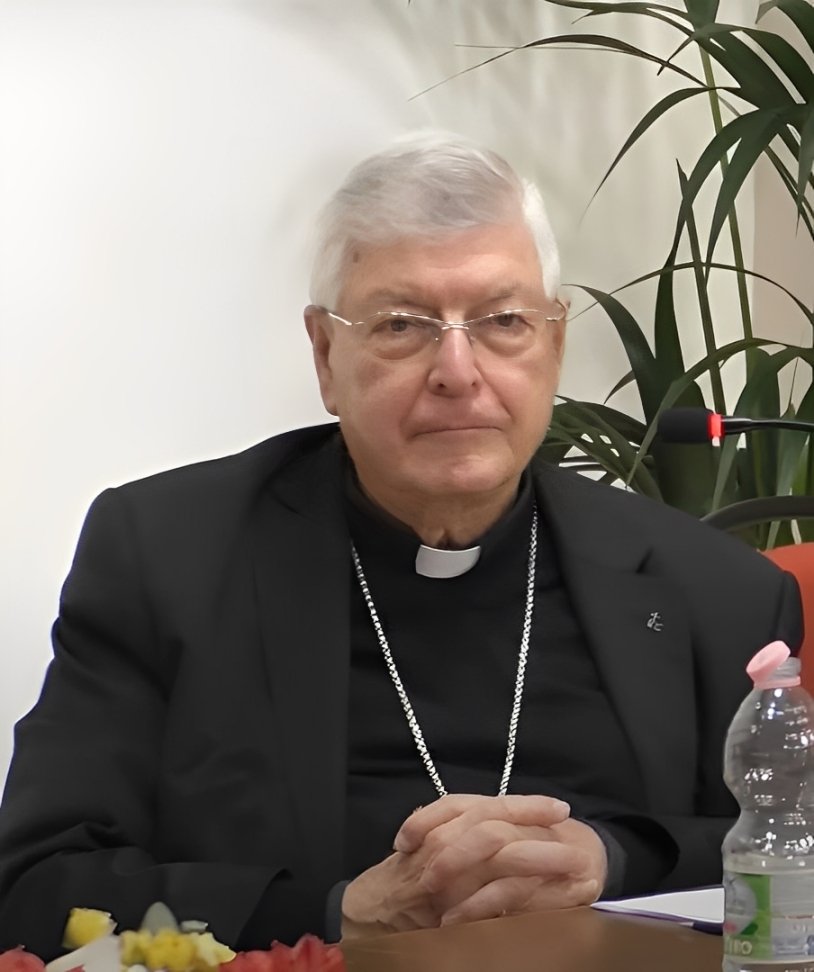
- Appointed: 19 June 2023
- Predecessor: Raymond Leo Burke
- Other post: Rector of the Pontifical Gregorian University (2004–2010)

Orders
- Ordination: 24 June 1973
- Created cardinal: 27 August 2022 by Pope Francis
- Rank: Cardinal deacon

Personal details
- Born: Gianfranco Ghirlanda; 5 July 1942 (age 84) Rome, Italy
- Denomination: Roman Catholic
- Education: Sapienza University of Rome; Pontifical Gregorian University
- Motto: Virtus In Infirmitate
- Coat of arms

Gianfranco Ghirlanda SJ (born 5 July 1942) is an Italian Catholic prelate and administrator at the Pontifical Gregorian University, where he has taught since 1975, served as dean of the Faculty of Canon Law from 1995 to 2004, and led as rector from 2004 to 2010. He is a member of the Jesuits.

Pope Francis made him a cardinal on 27 August 2022. On 19 June 2023, Ghirlanda was named patron of the Sovereign Military Order of Malta.

== Biography ==
Gianfranco Ghirlanda was born on 5 July 1942 in Rome. He worked at Fiat while studying at the Sapienza University of Rome and earned a doctorate in jurisprudence there in 1966. He joined the Society of Jesus that same year and completed his studies of theology at the Pontifical Gregorian University, earning a bachelor's degree in sacred theology in 1973. He was ordained a priest in 1973. Continuing to study at the Gregorian, he earned a licentiate in canon law in 1975 and a doctorate in canon law summa cum laude in 1978.

Ghirlanda has taught courses in canon law in various faculties of the Gregorian since 1975. In 1986 he became a full professor and served as dean of the Faculty of Canon Law from 1995 to 2004. He has served the Holy See as a consultor of various congregations and councils, and was a judge of the Court of Appeal in Vatican City from 1993 to 2003. He has published books on canon law, and approximately 110 articles in various publications.

He was appointed rector of the Gregorian on 1 September 2004 by Pope John Paul II.

He has assisted in the drafting of apostolic constitutions and authored the commentary that accompanied the release of Anglicanorum coetibus in 2009.

On 4 July 2014, Cardinal Joao Braz de Aviz and Archbishop Jose Rodriguez Carballo, the Prefect and the Secretary of the Congregation for Institutes of Consecrated Life and Societies of Apostolic Life, announced Ghirlanda's appointment as papal assistant to the Legion of Christ in its ongoing attempt to complete its renewal process. He was assigned a similar role in 2020 with respect to the lay association Memores Domini.

On 6 October 2018, he was named a member of the Dicastery for the Laity, Family and Life.

On 27 August 2022, Pope Francis made him a Cardinal-Deacon of Santissimo Nome di Gesù. He received a dispensation from the requirement that only bishops can become cardinals.

On 19 June 2023 Pope Francis named him to succeed Raymond Leo Cardinal Burke as Cardinal Patron of the Sovereign Military Order of Malta.

== See also ==
- Cardinals created by Pope Francis

Catholic Church titles
Preceded by Raymond Leo Burke	Patron of the Sovereign Military Order of Malta; 2023–present	Incumbent
Preceded by Eduardo Martínez Somalo	— TITULAR — Cardinal Deacon of Sanctissimi Nominis Iesu; 2022–present	Incumbent
Academic offices
Preceded by Franco Imoda	Rector of the Pontifical Gregorian University; 2004–2010	Succeeded by François-Xavier Dumortier
