= Joseph Pignatelli =

Spanish Jesuit priest

Saint Joseph Mary Pignatelli SJ
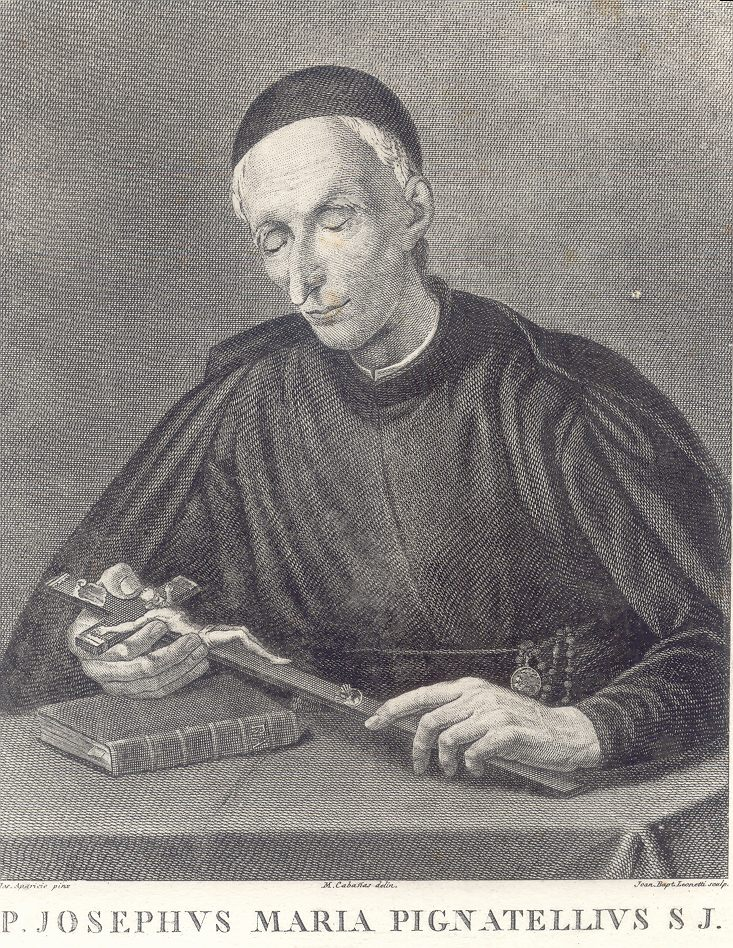

Restorer of the Society of Jesus
- Born: December 27, 1737; Zaragoza, Spain
- Died: November 15, 1811 (aged 73); Rome, First French Empire
- Venerated in: Catholic Church
- Beatified: 21 May 1933 by Pope Pius XI
- Canonized: 12 June 1954 by Pope Pius XII
- Major shrine: Church of the Gesù; Piazza del Gesù, Rome, Italy
- Feast: 14 November

Joseph Mary Pignatelli, SJ (Spanish: José María Pignatelli) (27 December 1737 – 15 November 1811) was a Spanish priest who was the unofficial leader of the Jesuits in exile in Sardinia, after the suppression of the Society. Supervising its restoration, he is considered the second founder of the Society of Jesus.

== Life ==
=== Early life ===
Pignatelli was born in Zaragoza, Spain, of Neapolitan descent and noble lineage. He did his early studies in the Jesuit College of Zaragoza, along with his brother, Nicolás. There he developed tuberculosis, which was to plague him his entire life. He entered the Society of Jesus at the age of 15 on 8 May 1753 in Tarragona, despite his family's opposition. On completing his theological studies he was ordained a priest, and assigned to teach at the College of Zaragoza.

In 1766 the Governor of Zaragoza was held responsible for a threatened famine, and so enraged was the populace against him that they were about to destroy the Governor's palace by fire. Pignatelli's persuasive power over the people averted the calamity. Despite the letter of thanks sent by King Charles III of Spain, the Jesuits were accused of instigating the above-mentioned riot. Pignatelli's refutation of the charge was followed by the decree of expulsion of the Jesuits of Zaragoza on 4 April 1767.

The Count of Aranda, a favorite of the king and a supporter of the expulsion of the Jesuits from Spain, offered to allow Pignatelli and his brother, Nicolás (also a member of the Society), as members of the nobility, to remain in the city, provided that they leave the Society. In spite of Joseph's ill-health, the brothers stood firm and went into exile with their confreres.

=== Exile ===
Not permitted by Pope Clement XIII to land at Civitavecchia in Italy, along with the other Jesuits of the province of Aragon, they sailed to the Corsican Republic, where Pignatelli displayed a marked ability for organization in providing for 600 priests and seminarians. His sister, the Duchess of Acerra, aided them with money and provisions. He organized studies and the Jesuits were able to maintain their regular religious observances.

When France took control of Corsica in 1770, the Jesuits were obliged to go to Genoa for shelter. Pignatelli was again required to secure shelter in the legation of Ferrara, not only for the Jesuits of his own province, but also for those forced home from the missions in New Spain. The community, however, was dissolved upon the suppression of the entire Society by Pope Clement XIV in August 1773. The two Pignatelli brothers were then obliged to seek refuge in Bologna, where they lived in retirement, being forbidden to exercise their Christian ministry. They devoted themselves to study and Pignatelli began to collect books and manuscripts bearing on the history of the Society.

=== Restoration ===
A few years later, the newly elected Pope Pius VI granted permission for the surviving ex-Jesuits to reunite with the members of the Society of Jesus still functioning in the Russian Empire. Pignatelli sought to go there, that he might join them, but for various reasons he was obliged to defer his departure. During this delay Pignatelli was permitted by Ferdinand, Duke of Parma (who had violently expelled them from his lands in 1768), to re-establish the Society in his duchy. In 1793, having obtained through Empress Catherine II of Russia a few Jesuit fathers from Russia, along with some other Jesuits, the new establishment was made.

On 6 July 1797, Pignatelli renewed his religious vows. In 1799 he was appointed master of novices for a new novitiate in Colorno, which had been authorized by the pope. On the death of the Duke of Parma in 1802, the duchy was absorbed into France. Nevertheless, the Jesuits remained undisturbed for eighteen months, during which period Pignatelli was appointed provincial superior of the Jesuits within Italy in 1800 by Pope Pius VII. After considerable discussion he obtained permission for the Jesuits to serve in the Kingdom of Naples. The papal brief authorizing this (30 July 1804) was much more favorable than that which had been granted for Parma. The surviving Jesuits soon asked to be received back, but many were engaged in various ecclesiastical posts where they were obligated to stay. Schools and a college were opened in Sicily, but when this part of the kingdom fell into Napoleon's power the dispersion of the Jesuits was ordered, though the decree was not rigorously enforced. Pignatelli founded colleges in Rome, Tivoli, and Orvieto, and the Jesuit fathers were gradually invited to other cities.

During the exile of Pope Pius VII and the French occupation of the Papal States, the Society continued untouched, owing largely to the prudence of Pignatelli; he even managed to avoid any oaths of allegiance to Napoleon. He also secured the restoration of the Society in Sardinia in 1807.

=== Death and veneration ===
Pignatelli died in Rome, then under French occupation, on 15 November 1811, due to hemorrhaging resulting from his tuberculosis, which had begun the previous month. His remains rest today in a reliquary under the altar of the Chapel of the Passion in the Church of the Gesù in Rome.

The cause for Pignatelli's canonization was introduced under Pope Gregory XVI. He was beatified on 21 May 1933 by Pope Pius XI, and the cause for his canonization was formally opened on 19 June 1935. He was canonized on 12 June 1954 by Pope Pius XII.

== Legacy ==
The Society of Jesus was fully restored in the Catholic Church in 1814.

After Ignatius of Loyola, the founder of the Society of Jesus, Pignatelli is arguably the most important Jesuit in its subsequent history, linking the two Societies, the old Society which was first founded in 1540, and the new Society which was founded forty years after it had been suppressed by Pope Clement XIV in 1773. Pignatelli can thus be rightly considered the savior and restorer of the Society of Jesus.
