= Giovanni Battista Fiammeri =

Italian painter (c. 1530–1606)

Giovanni Battista Fiammeri (c. 1530 – 1606) was an Italian painter and Jesuit priest, active in Florence.

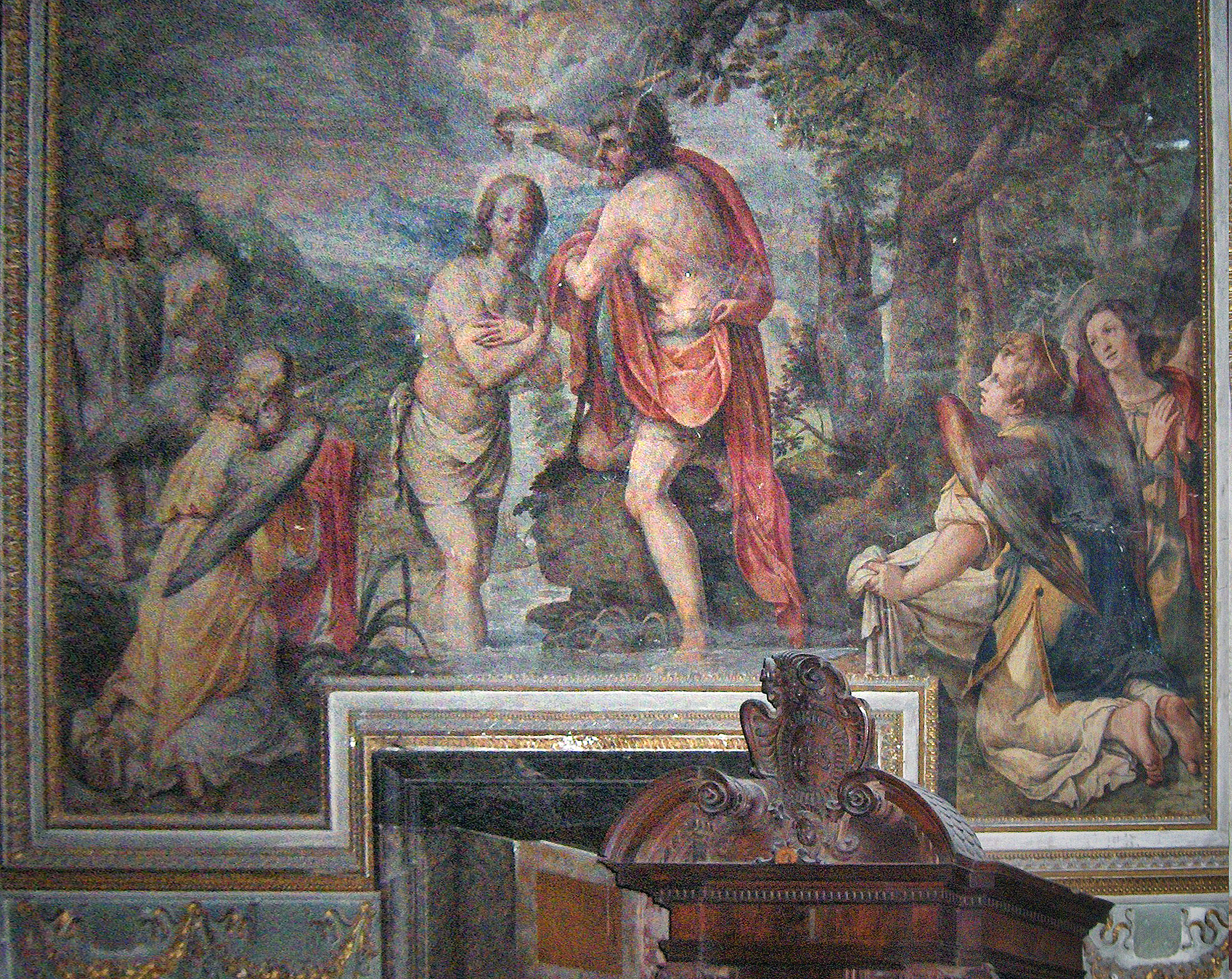
"Baptism of Christ" by Fiammeri and his assistants; Gesù, Rome

He oversaw part of the decoration of the Church of the Gesù in Rome.

== Sources ==
- Baglione, Giovanni (1733) [1641]. Le Vite de' Pittori, Scultori, Architetti, ed Intagliatori dal Pontificato di Gregorio XII del 1572. fino a' tempi de Papa Urbano VIII. nel 1642 [Lives of the painters, sculptors, architects, and engravers during the papacies of Gregory XII in 1572 to Urban VIII in 1642]. Naples: Giovanni Battista Passari. p. 92.
