= Side chapel =

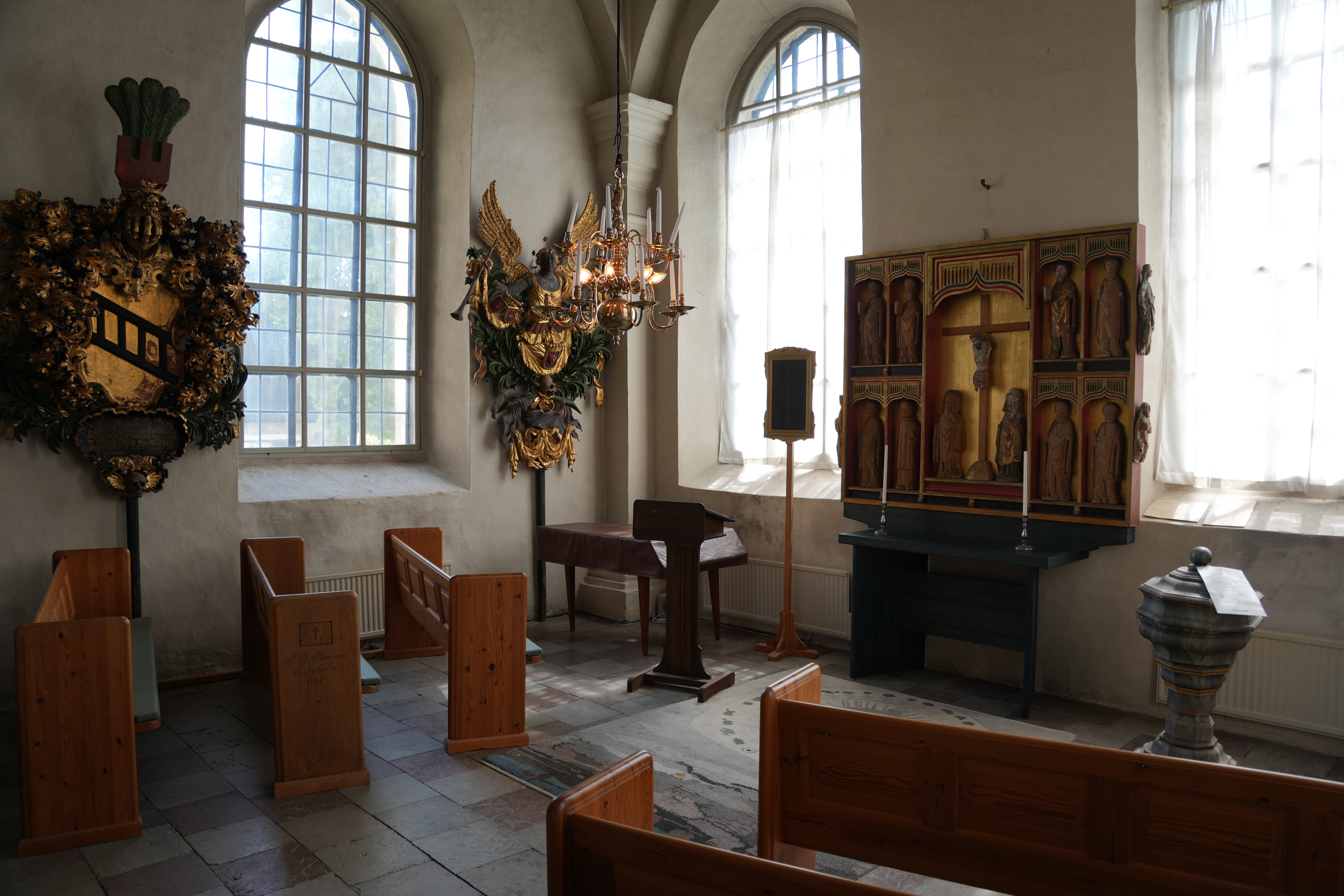
The side chapel of Frötuna Church (Evangelical-Lutheran) in Norrtälje, Sweden

A side chapel is a chapel in a church building, usually located adjacent to the nave of the main sanctuary. They are historically found in a number of large Roman Catholic, Evangelical-Lutheran, and Anglican churches. Side chapels include their own altar for the celebration of the Eucharist. Within a church, side chapels may serve various purposes, such as the normative place where baptisms occur or confession and absolution take place. Side chapels may house a relic of a particular saint. Side chapels that are dedicated to the Blessed Virgin Mary are called Lady chapels; these are common in the Roman Catholic and Evangelical-Lutheran traditions, as well as in some Anglican churches. When serving as the main area in which an anchorite or anchoress prays, a side chapel is called a anchorhold.

== Gallery ==
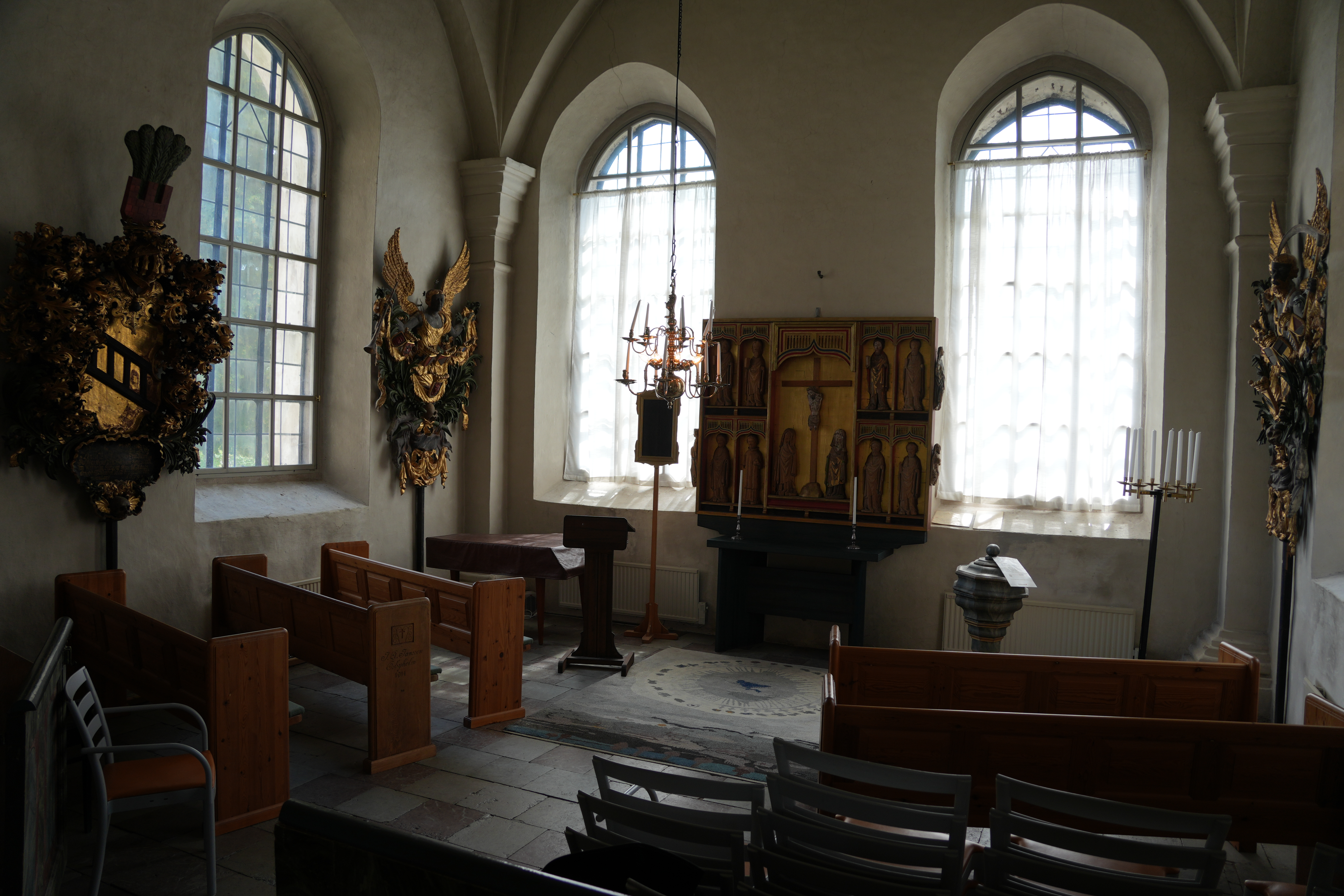
A side chapel of Frötuna Church (Evangelical-Lutheran) in Norrtälje, Sweden

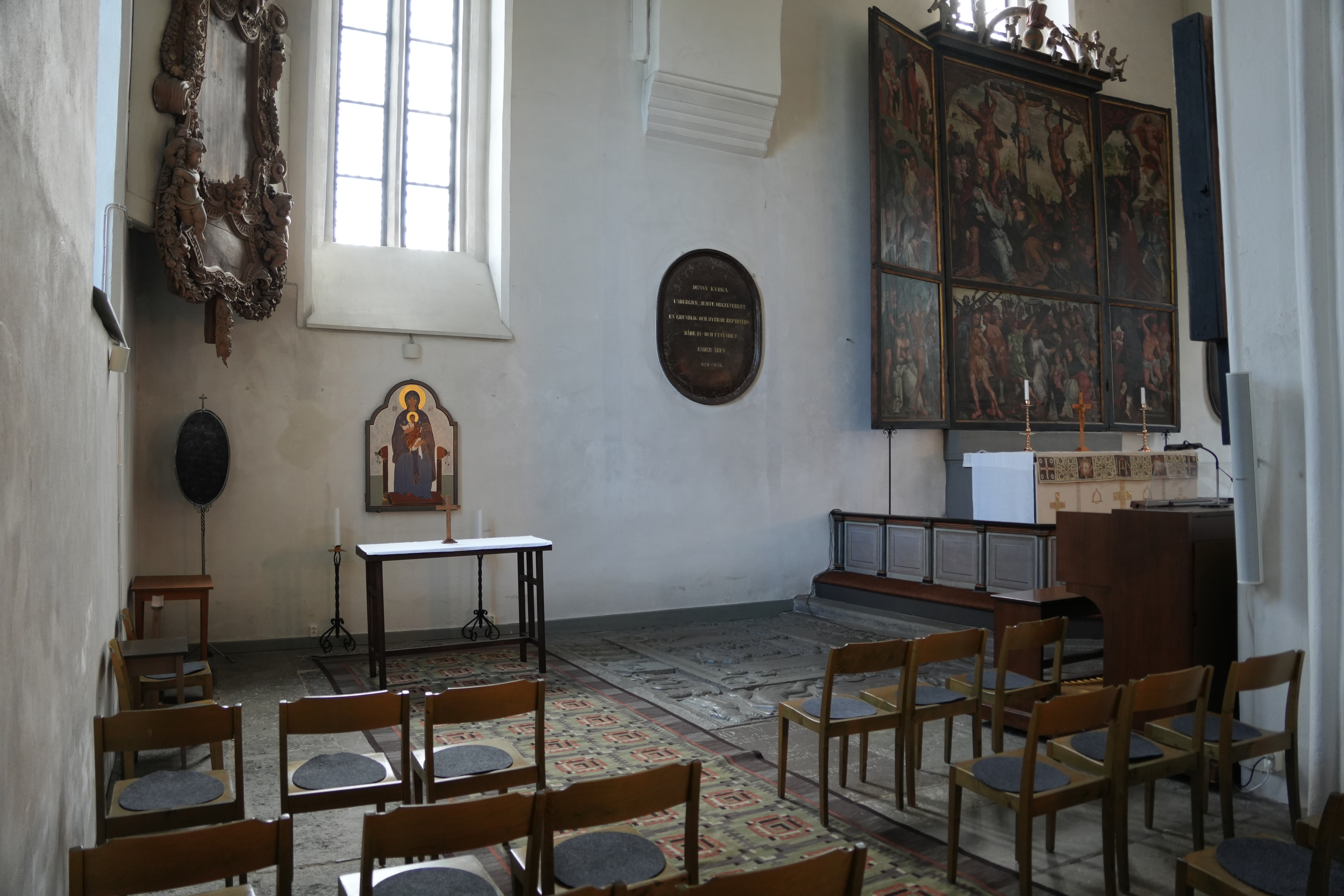
A Lady chapel dedicated to the Blessed Virgin Mary in the Evangelical Lutheran Church of our Lady in Skänninge, Sweden

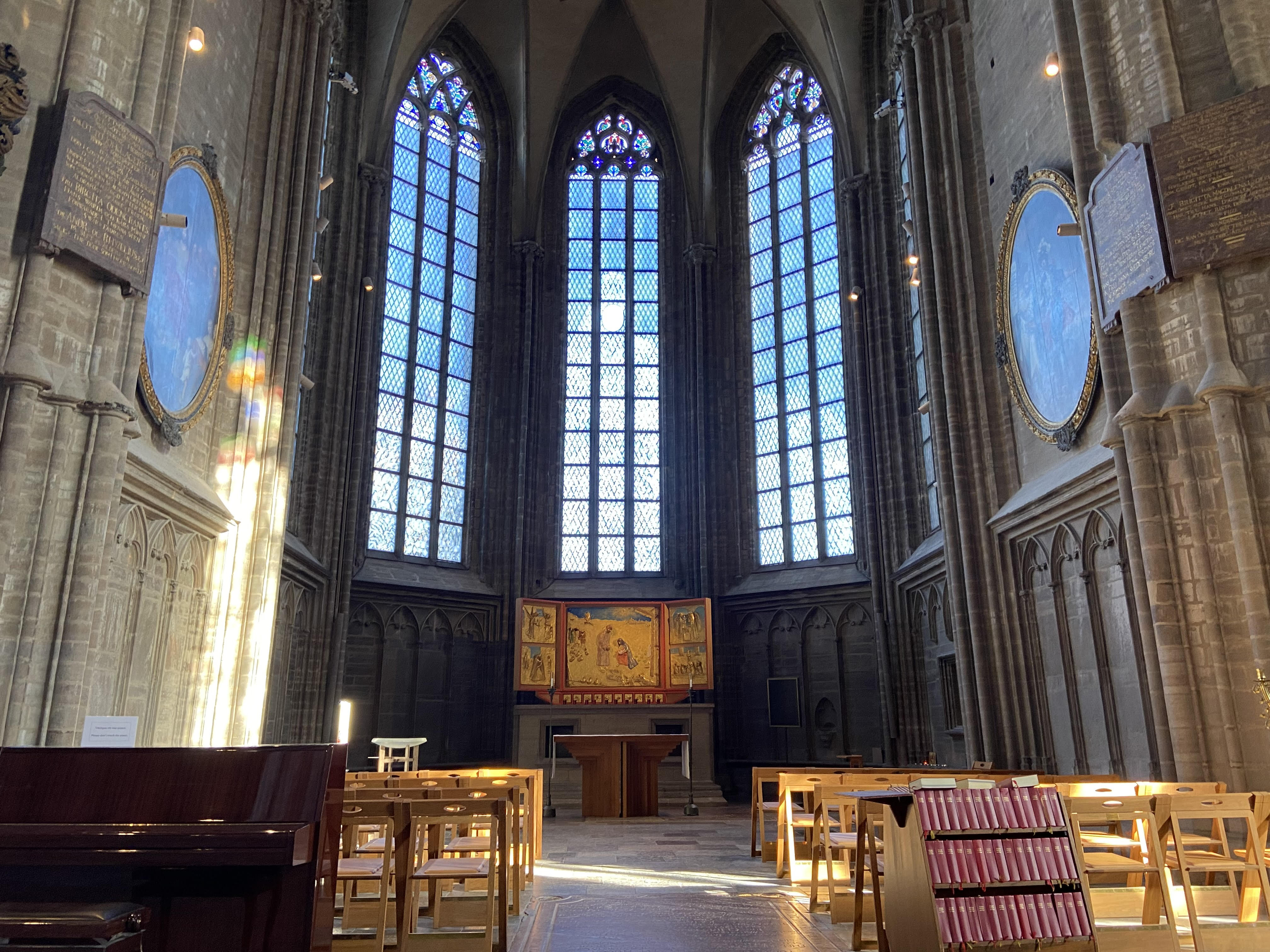
The Lady chapel of Evangelical-Lutheran Linköping Cathedral, with its 1987 altarpiece containing scenes from the life of the Blessed Virgin Mary, including the Annunciation to the Blessed Virgin Mary, the Visitation of the Blessed Virgin Mary, and the Purification of the Virgin. On the predella are ten roses cast in bronze, which refer to the Hail Mary and the rosary.

A side chapel of Saint Thomas Church (Evangelical-Lutheran) in Vällingby, Sweden

== See also ==
- Chancel
- Bye-altar
