= Gesù e Maria, Rome =

Gesù e Maria
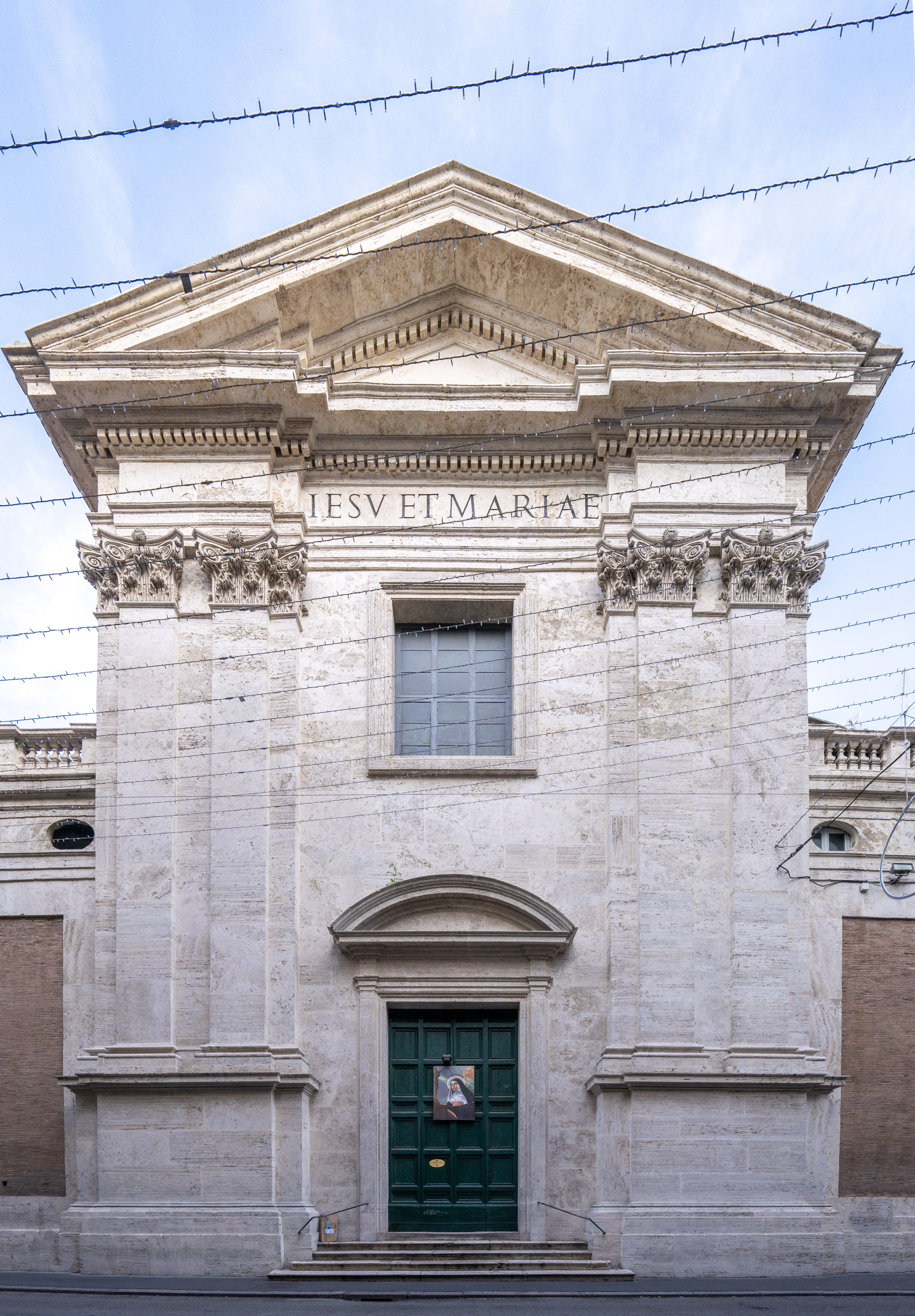
- Facade
- Click on the map for a fullscreen view
- 41°54′29″N 12°28′39″E
- Location: Via del Corso 45, Rome
- Country: Italy
- Denomination: Roman Catholic
- Tradition: Roman Rite
- Religious institute: Institute of Christ the King Sovereign Priest

History
- Status: titular church
- Dedication: Jesus and Mary, mother of Jesus
- Consecrated: 1636, 1675

Architecture
- Architect(s): Carlo Buzio and Carlo Rainaldi
- Architectural type: Church
- Style: Baroque
- Groundbreaking: 1633
- Completed: 1674 (façade)

Specifications
- Length: 27 meters (nave)
- Materials: Travertine (Façade)

Gesù e Maria is a Baroque church located on Via del Corso in the Rione Campo Marzio of central Rome, Italy. It faces across the street the similarly Baroque facade of San Giacomo in Augusta.

It is more correctly called Chiesa dei Santi Nomi di Gesù e Maria ("Church of the Holy Names of Jesus and Mary"). The church was made a cardinalate deaconry by Pope Paul VI in 1967 with the name of Santissimi Nomi di Gesù e Maria in Via Lata ("Most Holy Names of Jesus and Mary on Via Lata"). "Via Lata" is the old name of Via del Corso.

== History ==
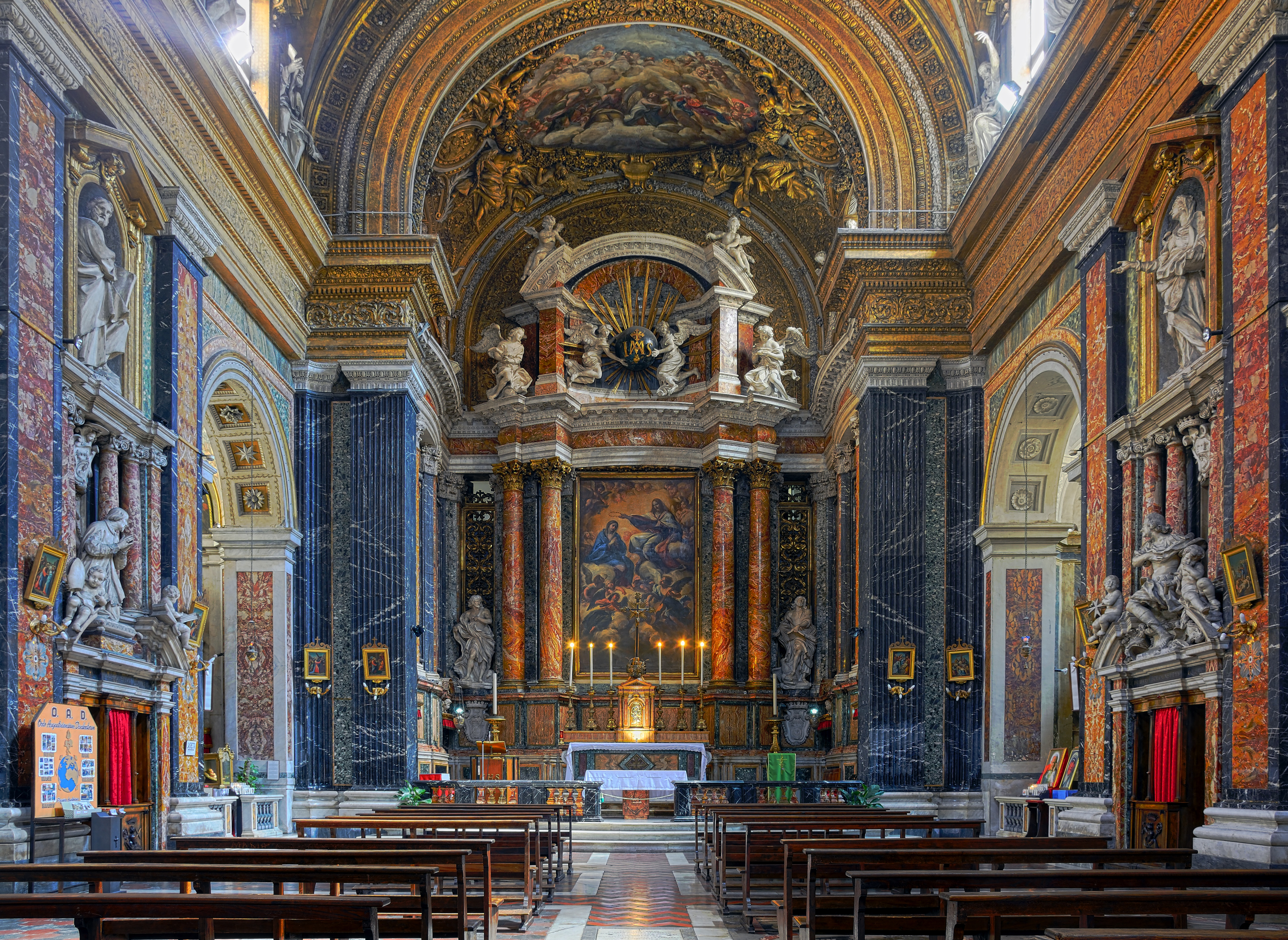
Interior of nave.

Initially a church titled Sant'Antonio Abate in Augusta was located on the site, which was previously owned by the Colona family. Construction of the church began in 1633 for a Discalced Augustinian order, with designs by Carlo Buzio (also called Carlo Milanese). The structure was completed by 1635 and consecrated the next year to Jesus and Mary.

Later the architect Carlo Rainaldi was commissioned to design the simple travertine facade (1671–1674) and ornamented Baroque interiors, including the main altar. From 1678 to 1690, the expensive and ornate marble interior decoration was installed under the patronage of Giorgio Bolognetti, bishop of Rieti. From the 18th through 19th centuries, the church belonged to the Jesuit order. The church was reconsecrated the next year as recalled by an inscription in the sacristy.

On January 25th, 2026, a fire broke out in the Presepio of the Church. It was extinguished by firefighters.

== Interior ==
The vault and the main altarpiece, depicting a Coronation of the Virgin (1679), was painted by Giacinto Brandi. Stucco work was arranged by Gramignoli and Monsu Michele. The church entrance to the sacristy has frescoes by Giovanni Lanfranco. Other paintings in the sacristy are by Padre Matteo di San Alessio from Palermo. The main altarpiece, Charity of St Thomas of Villanova was painted by Felice Ottini.

On the left side of the church are chapels dedicated to St Thomas of Villanova (with painting by Felice Ottini), St Joseph, and to the Madonna of Divine Help. It contains funerary monuments for Ercole and Luigi Bolognetti, brothers of bishop Giorgio Bolognetti, whose monument is present further down along the nave. On the right side of the church are chapels dedicated to the Crucifixion (with statuary by Francesco Aprile), St Nicholas of Tolentino (canvas painted by Basilio Francese or Giovanni Carbone), and St Anne. This side contains funerary monuments dedicated to Pietro and Francesco Bolognetti (by Pietro Cavallini, 1681), and to Mario Bolognetti (by Francesco Aprile).

By the entrance, the first funeral monuments on the right were for members of the Corno family, including a Monument to Giulio del Corno made by Ercole Ferrata and Domenico Guidi, pupils of Bernini.

The first chapel on the right has the bust of Sig. Bolognetti by Francesco Aprile. The second chapel has a painting of San Nicola by Basilio Francese and sculptures by Cavallini. The third chapel has a Sant'Antonio Abate painted by Girolamo Pesci. The main chapel has a painting by Giacinto Brandi. The statues in niches of St John the Baptist and St John Evangelist are by Giuseppe Mazzuoli, while the angel statues are by Paolo Naldini and Francesco Cavallini. Other works in the church are by Lorenzo Ottoni, Monsu Michele Maglia (also called Michel Maille) and Giovanni Antonio Lelli.

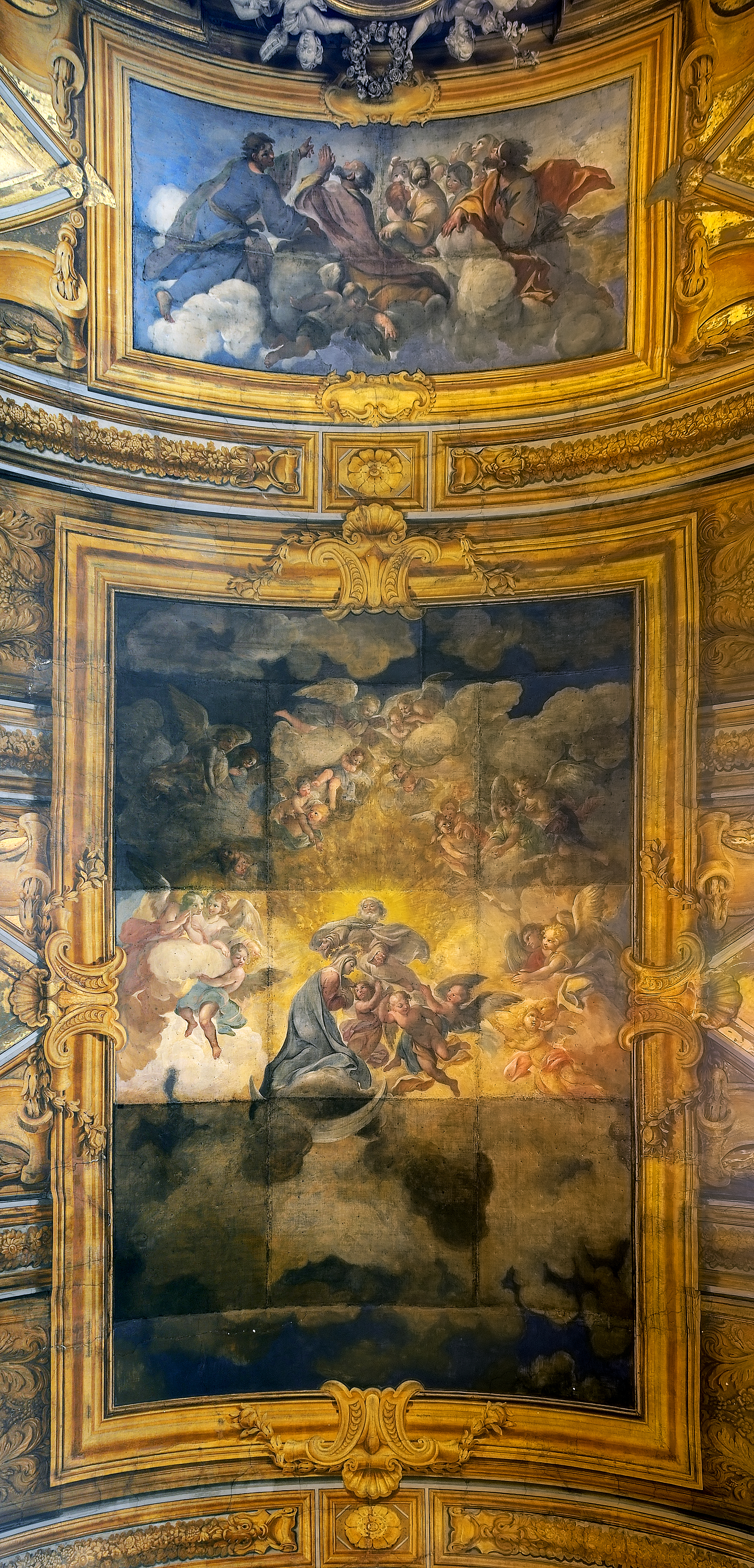
Ceiling of the church with fresco of the Assumption of Mary

== List of Cardinal Protectors ==
- Justinus Darmojuwono (1967–1994)
- Avery Dulles, S.J. (2001–2008)
- Domenico Bartolucci (2010–2013)
- Luigi De Magistris (2015–2022)
- Timothy Peter Joseph Radcliffe, O.P. (2024–present)

== Sources ==
- Derived from Italian Wikipedia entry
- Titi, Filippo (1763). Descrizione delle Pitture, Sculture e Architetture esposte in Roma. Marco Pagliarini, Rome. pp. 381–384. "Fillipo Titi."
