= Aprile (disambiguation) =

Aprile is a 1998 Italian film. Aprile may also refer to:

== Surname ==
- Andrea Finocchiaro Aprile (1878–1964), Italian politician
- Camillo Finocchiaro Aprile (1851–1916), Italian jurist and politician
- Claudio Aprile (born 1969), Uruguayan-born Canadian chef
- Elena Aprile (born 1954), Italian experimental particle physicist
- Francesco Aprile (1657–1710), Italian sculptor and stucco artist
- Giulia Aprile (born 1995), Italian middle-distance runner
- Giuseppe Aprile (1731–1813), Italian castrato singer and music teacher
- Gustavo Aprile (born 1988), Montevidean footballer
- Holly Aprile (born 1969), American softball coach
- Johnny Aprile (born 1989), Canadian football player
- Nadia Aprile (born 1962), Italian politician
- Onata Aprile, American actress

== First name ==
- Aprile Millo (born 1958), American operatic soprano

== Fictional characters ==
- Don Raymonde Aprile from Mario Puzo's novel Omertà
- Jackie Aprile Jr., son of Jackie Aprile Sr., from the TV series The Sopranos
- Jackie Aprile Sr., from the TV series The Sopranos
- Richie Aprile, older brother of Jackie Aprile Sr., from the TV series The Sopranos

== Other ==
- Aprile is the Italian name for the month of April
- Entoloma aprile, a species of Entoloma

== See also ==
- April (disambiguation)
