= San Nicolò di Villola =

Human settlement in Bologna, Italy

Coordinates: 44.4939°N 11.3428°E

San Nicolò di Villola is a Roman Catholic parish church located on via Cadriano #11 in Bologna, Italy.

== History ==
The church is dedicated to Saint Nicholas of Bari. A church at the site is documented from the 13th century, with the present church dating to the 18th century. The main altar houses a canvas (1832) depicting the patron saint. The church originally had four lateral chapels. In the second chapel on the left is a crucifix attributed to Alessandro Algardi.
