= Ercole Ferrata =

Italian sculptor

Ercole Ferrata (1610 – 10 July 1686) was an Italian sculptor of the Roman Baroque.

== Biography ==
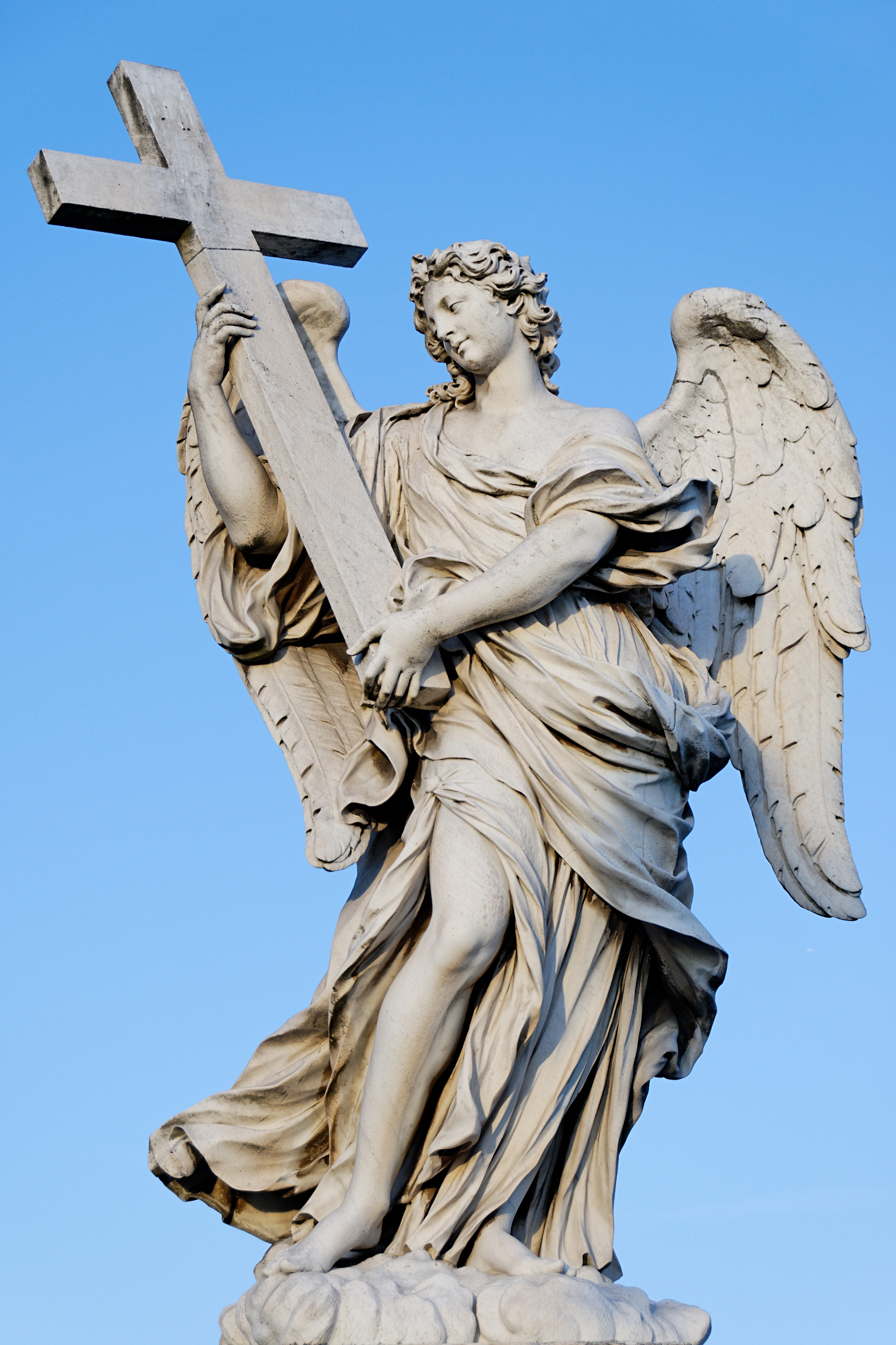
Angel with a Cross, Ponte Sant'Angelo, Rome

A native of Pellio Inferiore, near Como, Ferrata initially apprenticed with Alessandro Algardi, and became one of his prime assistants. When his mentor died, Ferrata and another pupil, Domenico Guidi, completed Algardi's unfinished Vision of Saint Nicholas at San Nicola da Tolentino; ultimately, the innovative arrangement of two independent but interactive groups derives from the original design by Algardi.

While Ferrata's initial work still owes much to Algardi, Ferrata distanced himself from the classical serenity found in the work of his mentor and Francois Duquesnoy, and moved towards the expressive emotionalism of Gian Lorenzo Bernini. He is best known for two works in Sant'Agnese in Agone in Rome, the Bernini-inspired The Death of St. Agnes (1660–64) as well as the marble relief Stoning of St Emerenziana (1660). The latter has a restraint influenced by his mentor, Algardi, although the superior half was completed by one of his pupils, Leonardo Retti in 1689-1709. Under the leadership of Bernini, he sculpted the Angel with a Cross for the Ponte Sant'Angelo and reportedly completed the elephant statue holding the obelisk in front of Santa Maria sopra Minerva. Early in his career he worked with Cosimo Fanzago and Giuliano Finelli in Naples. He also made the statue of Saint Catherine of Siena for the Chigi Chapel in the Duomo di Siena. With Francesco Aprile he sculpted Sant'Anastasia in Santa Anastasia in Rome, another statue resembling Bernini's famous dying Beata Ludovica Albertoni.

In 1673, when Cosimo III, Grand Duke of Tuscany established an informal academy in the Villa Madama in Rome, to give promising students an opportunity to study from antiquities, he placed it under the direction of Ercole Ferrata and the painter Ciro Ferri, who had been collaborating with Pietro da Cortona in frescoes for Palazzo Pitti. In 1677, when the Grand Duke arranged to get his antique sculptures released from Rome, Ercole Ferrata was recalled to Florence to unpack and see to them. "A rather colourless, plodding sculptor whose gifts were best displayed in executing or imitating the conceptions of more imaginative artists, Ferrata nonetheless enjoyed a deserved reputation as an authority on the antique".

When a headless torso had been discovered a few years previously, during the opening of a new road to the Santa Maria in Vallicella, the order of the Oratorians who owned the torso sent it to be "restored" by Ercole Ferrata, who essentially created the Faun Carrying a Kid, which after purchase by Queen Christina, was sold in 1724 to Philip V of Spain. Ferrata is less known for the documented fact that he provided the elegant arms for the Venus de' Medici. "He showed remarkable flair in making just the kind of attractive additions to a mutilated statue which most appealed to connoisseurs", according to Francis Haskell and Nicholas Penny.

He worked along with Bernini creating fountain for the gardens palace of the Count of Ericeira in Lisbon - unfortunately lost along with the palace, great library and art collection due to the great Lisbon earthquake of 1755.

Of the generation after Bernini and Algardi, which included Domenico Guidi and Antonio Raggi, Ferrata led the most successful studio for training sculptors. Ferrata's pupils included the Florentine Giovanni Battista Foggini as well as Melchiorre Cafà, who acted as Ercole's studio assistant. In addition he trained Leonardo Retti, Francesco Aprile, Michele Maglia, Filippo Carcani, Giuseppe Mazzuoli, Lorenzo Ottoni, and Giuseppe Rusnati. Among his last pupils was Camillo Rusconi, who moved to Rome in 1686 to work briefly in Ferrata's studio.

Ercole Ferrata died at Rome in 1686.

== Collections ==
Ferrata's work is held in the permanent collections of many museums worldwide, including the Museo d'Arte Sacra di Scaria, the Birmingham Museums, the Wignacourt Museum, the Victoria and Albert Museum, the University of Michigan Museum of Art, the Walters Art Museum, and the Princeton University Art Museum.

== Gallery ==
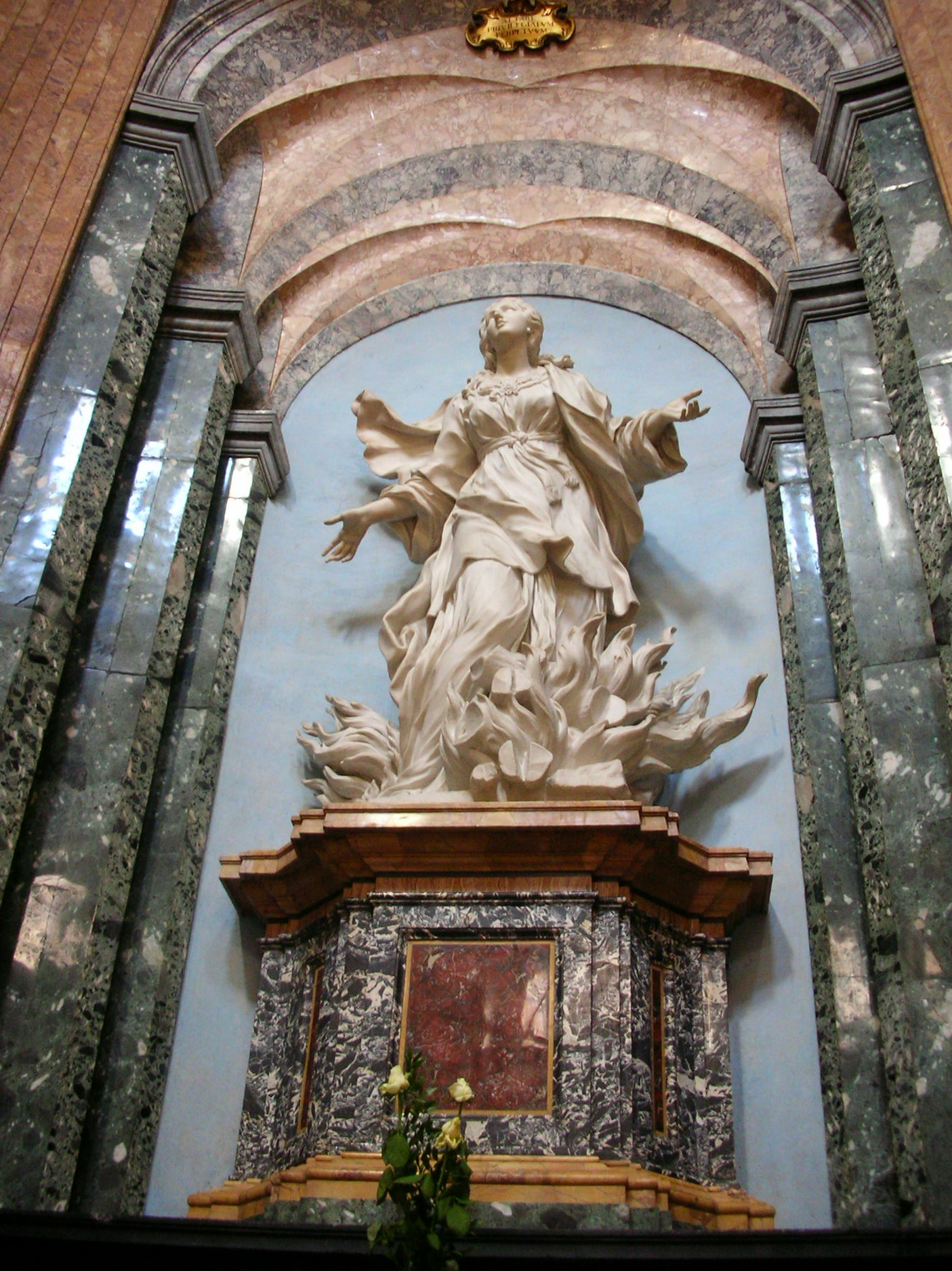
Martyrdom of St. Agnes on a pyre (Sant Agnese Agone, Rome)

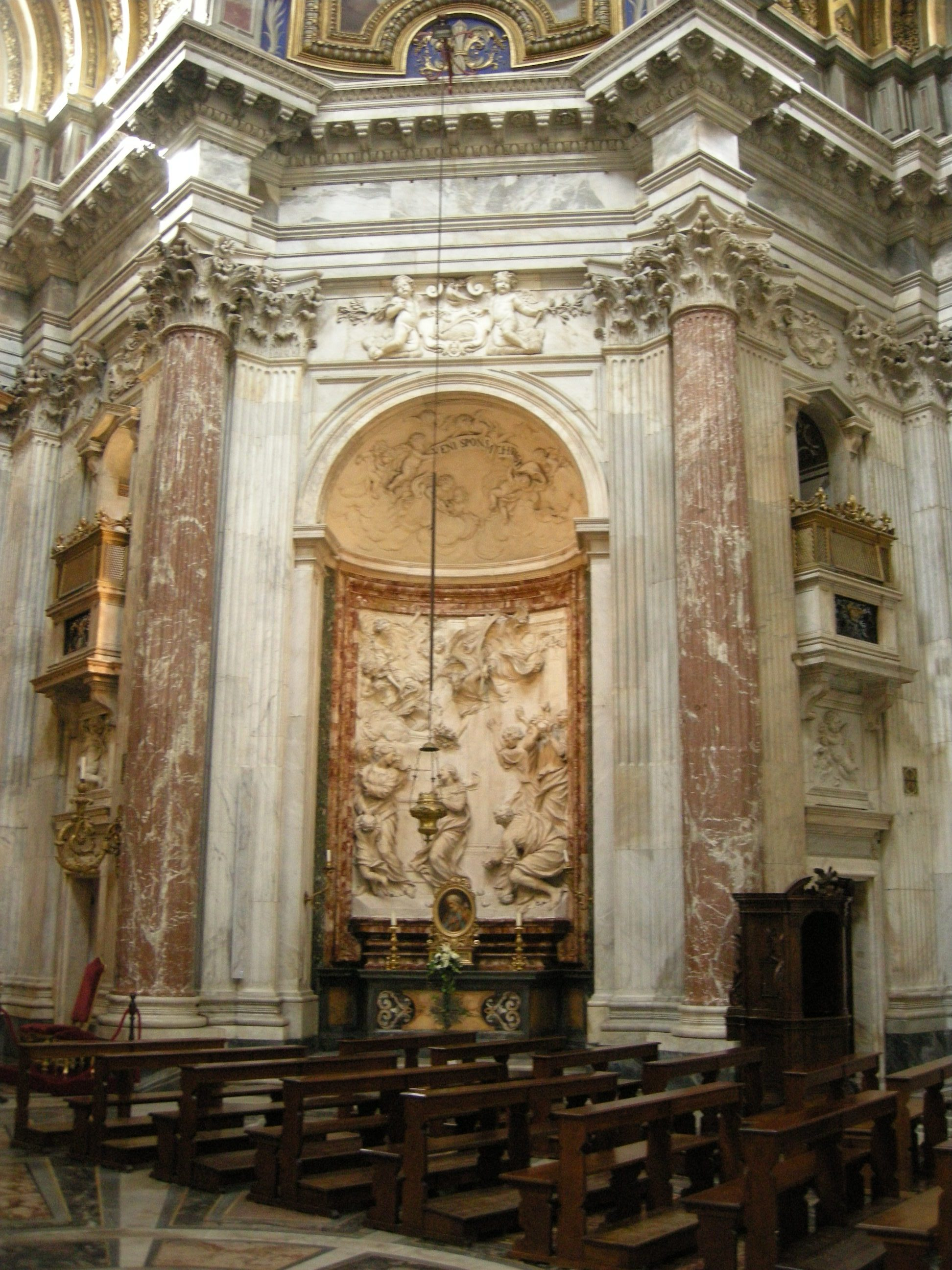
The Martyrdom of Saint Emerentiana (Sant Agnese Agone, Rome)

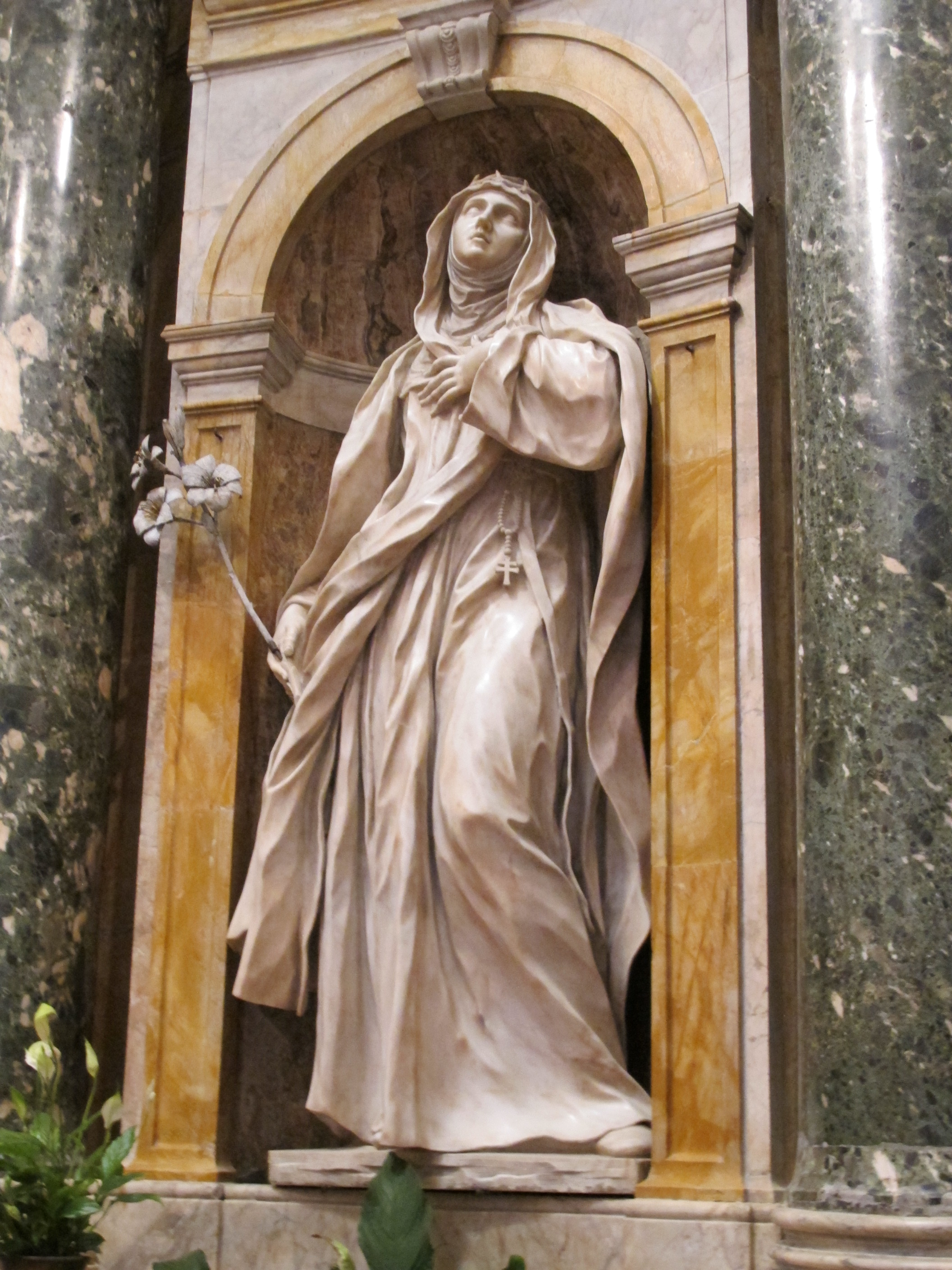
St Catherine of Siena (Chigi Chapel, Siena)

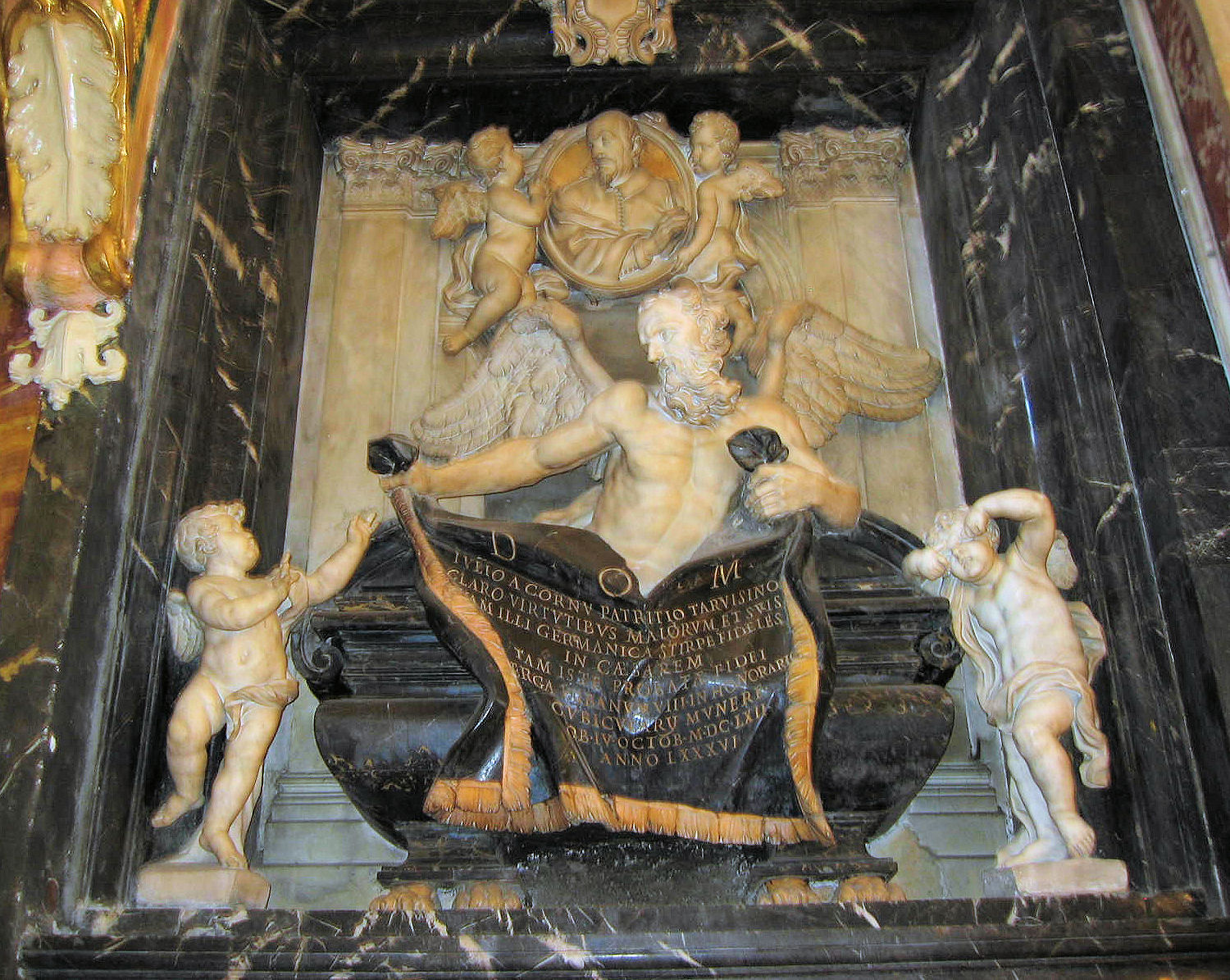
Funereal Monument to Giulio Del Corno (Gesù e Maria, Rome)

Fountain of Neptune (Palace of Queluz, Portugal)
