= Rest on the Flight into Egypt (Algardi) =

Relief by Alessandro Algardi

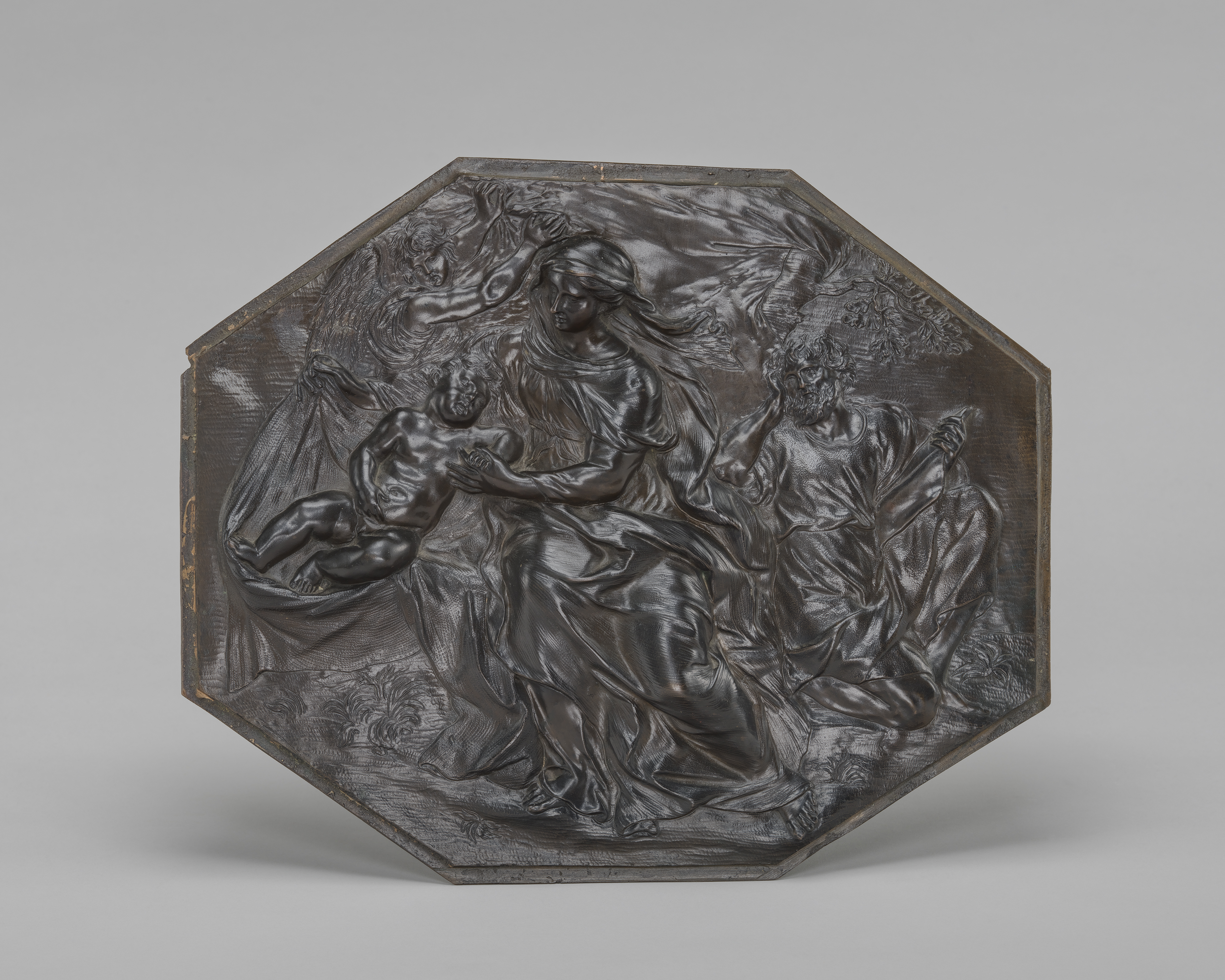
Alessandro Algardi, The Rest on the Flight into Egypt, c. 1635, National Gallery of Art, Washington, D.C.

The Rest on the Flight into Egypt is a c. 1640 gilt-bronze relief by Alessandro Algardi. It and its companion piece The Martyrdom of St Paul are contemporary replicas of the artist's reliefs accompanying the same artist's The Martyrdom of St Paul, a marble group for San Paolo Maggiore in Bologna. Both replicas are now in the Victoria and Albert Museum, whilst a second version of Rest is now in the Fitzwilliam Museum in Cambridge.
