= Pietro Boncompagni =

Pietro Corcos Boncompagni (1592–1664) was a member of the branch of the historic Jewish Roman family that embraced Christianity, in the person of Solomon Corcos, who in being baptised in 1582 added the family name of Pope Gregory XIII (Ugo Buoncompagni) to his own. In 1635-38, his heir Pietro Corcos Boncampagni commissioned from Alessandro Algardi a colossal statue of Philip Neri with kneeling angels, completed in 1640 for the sacristy of Santa Maria in Vallicella, the church of the Oratorians in Rome. From the 1640s, he enlarged and rebuilt the Palazzo Boncompagni Corcos in via del Governo Vecchio on the little hill in Rome called Monte Giordano, providing it with an elegantly balanced façade and transforming the interior with a courtyard, a grand staircase and a suite of reception rooms on the piano nobile.
