= Timothy Radcliffe =

English Catholic cardinal and Dominican friar (born 1945)

His Eminence Timothy Radcliffe OP
- Cardinal, Master Emeritus of the Order of Preachers
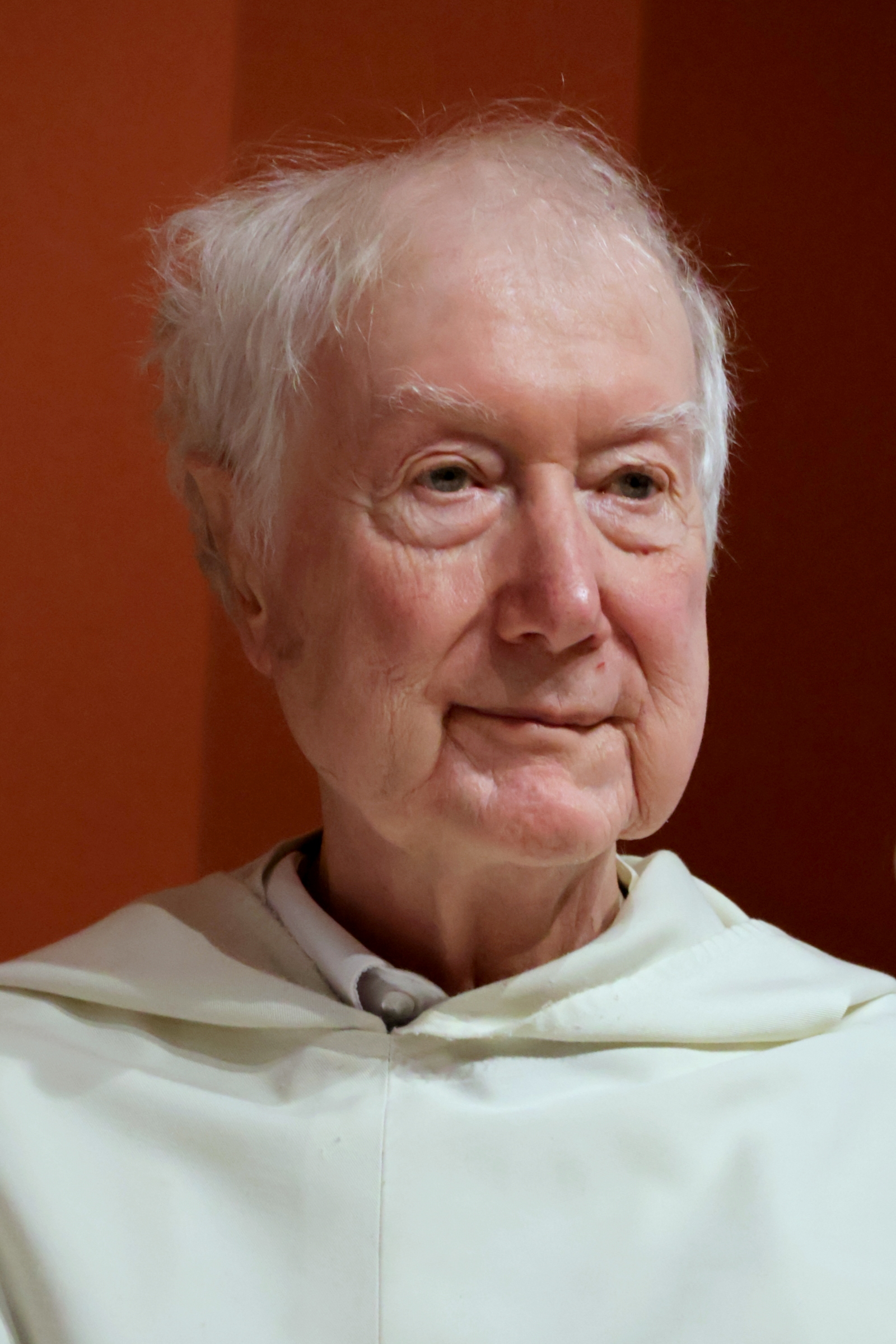
- Cardinal Radcliffe in 2025
- Church: Catholic Church
- In office: 1992–2001
- Predecessor: Damian Byrne
- Successor: Carlos Azpiroz Costa
- Other posts: Cardinal Deacon of Nomi di Gesù e Maria in Via Lata (2024–present)

Orders
- Ordination: 2 October 1971 by Christopher Butler
- Created cardinal: 7 December 2024 by Pope Francis
- Rank: Cardinal deacon

Personal details
- Born: Timothy Peter Joseph Radcliffe; 22 August 1945 (age 81) London, England
- Denomination: Catholic
- Residence: Blackfriars Priory, Oxford, England
- Occupation: Academic, priest, theologian
- Education: St John's College, Oxford
- Coat of arms

Timothy Peter Joseph Cardinal Radcliffe OP (born 22 August 1945) is an English Catholic prelate who served as Master of the Order of Preachers from 1992 to 2001. He was created a cardinal by Pope Francis in 2024.

Radcliffe is the only friar of the Dominican Order's English Province to hold the office of Master-General. Radcliffe was previously director of the Las Casas Institute at the University of Oxford, promoting social justice and human rights.

== Biography ==
=== Formation ===
Born in 1945 of aristocratic descent, the third of five sons to Lt-Col. Hugh Radcliffe (1911–1993) and Mariequita née Pereira (1916–2005), he is in remainder to the Radcliffe baronetcy. His cousin, Sir Sebastian Radcliffe, 7th and present baronet, lives at the Château de Cheseaux in Switzerland and his eldest brother, Mark Radcliffe (born 1938), was High Sheriff of Hampshire for 1996/97.

After attending Worth Preparatory School (Worth School) in Sussex and Downside School in Somerset, Radcliffe studied Theology at St John's College, Oxford, graduating MA (elected Honorary Fellow, 1993). Then he entered the Dominican Order in 1965 and was ordained a priest in 1971.

=== Career ===
During the mid-1970s, Radcliffe was based at the West London Catholic Chaplaincy. A Fellow then Prior of Blackfriars, he taught Scripture at Oxford and was elected Prior Provincial of England in 1988. In 1992, he was elected Master of the Dominican Order, holding that office until 2001. During his tenure as Master, Radcliffe served as ex-officio Grand Chancellor of the Pontifical University of Saint Thomas Aquinas in Rome.

In 2001, after the expiration of his term as Master, Radcliffe took a sabbatical, before returning to the Dominican community in Oxford in 2002.

After serving for several years on the advisory board of the Las Casas Institute, which "critical reflection on questions of human dignity in the light of Catholic social teaching and theology", he was appointed the Institute's director in April 2014. His term as director ended after two years and he continued thereafter as a member of its advisory board. Radcliffe continued preaching and public speaking internationally.

In 2015, Radcliffe was named a Consultor to the Pontifical Council for Justice and Peace. (Note: The Pontifical Council for Justice and Peace ceased function in January 2017 with the erection of the dicastery for Promoting Integral Human Development.)

Although not a topic Radcliffe has often written on in his numerous publications, he has publicly defended Catholic teaching on same-sex marriage:

The Catholic Church does not oppose gay marriage. It considers it to be impossible... Marriage is founded on the glorious fact of sexual difference and its potential fertility. Without this, there would be no life on this planet, no evolution, no human beings, no future. Marriage takes all sorts of forms, from the alliance of clans through bride exchange to modern romantic love. We have come to see that it implies the equal love and dignity of man and woman. But everywhere and always, it remains founded on the union in difference of male and female. Through ceremonies and sacrament this is given a deeper meaning, which for Christians includes the union of God and humanity in Christ.

Radcliffe is a Patron of Positive Faith, the main ministry of Catholic AIDS Prevention and Support, sits on the Council on Christian Approaches to Defence and Disarmament, and is a Patron of Embrace the Middle East.

In January 2023, Pope Francis named Radcliffe to lead a three-day preparatory retreat for participants in the Synod on Synodality in October 2023. He returned to deliver the preparatory retreat for the October 2024 part of the same synod.

=== Cardinalate ===
On 6 October 2024, the Pope Francis announced that Radcliffe would be created a cardinal on 8 December, with the date later changed to 7 December.

Pope Francis granted him a rare dispensation from the requirement that all cardinals must be bishops, and on 7 December 2024 created Radcliffe a cardinal, designating him as a member of the order of cardinal deacons and assigning to him the deaconry of Chiesa dei Santi Nomi di Gesù e Maria. At the consistory Radcliffe wore his Dominican white habit rather than a cardinal's red robes, returning to the tradition that a member of an order who becomes a cardinal does not change his dress. He participated as a cardinal elector in the 2025 papal conclave that elected Pope Leo XIV; he was the sole elector who was not a bishop. His status as a cardinal elector ceased on his 80th birthday on August 22, 2025, nearly four months after the 2025 conclave, and nine months after being raised to the cardinalate.

In 2026, Radcliffe delivered the homily at a "Mass of Thanksgiving for 50 Years of Friendship, Partnership, and Commitment in the Pursuit of Justice" in honor of two gay men known for their personal relationship and professional partnership. The event was celebrated by gay rights advocates and decried by those unsympathetic to that movement. Radcliffe said his participation was entirely orthodox, that his remarks addressed friendship, and that he had not participated in blessing the pair. He noted that the event was planned to be private "so as not to cause misunderstanding".

== Honours ==
In 2003, the University of Oxford awarded Radcliffe the honorary degree of doctor of divinity, with the Chancellor, Chris Patten, citing the following:

I present a man distinguished both for eloquence and for wit, a master theologian who has never disregarded ordinary people, a practical man who believes that religion and the teachings of theology must be constantly applied to the conduct of public life.

Radcliffe received the 2007 Michael Ramsey Prize for theological writing for his book What Is the Point of Being A Christian?

Already an honorary doctor of philosophy of Providence College, Rhode Island, in 2024 Radcliffe also received the honorary degree of doctor of divinity from Liverpool Hope University.

== Bibliography ==
=== Books ===
- Sing a New Song. The Christian Vocation. Dublin: Dominican Publications, 1999. ISBN 1-871552-70-2
- I Call You Friends. London: Continuum, 2001. ISBN 0-8264-7262-1
- Seven Last Words. London: Burns & Oates, 2004. ISBN 0-86012-365-0
- What Is the Point of Being A Christian? London and New York: Burns & Oates, 2005. ISBN 0-86012-369-3
- Just One Year: Prayer and Worship through the Christian Year, edited by Timothy Radcliffe with Jean Harrison. London: Darton, Longman & Todd for CAFOD and Christian Aid, 2006. ISBN 0-232-52669-9
- Why Go to Church? The Drama of the Eucharist. London: Continuum, 2008. ISBN 978-0-8264-9956-1. Archbishop of Canterbury's Lent book 2009
- Christians and Sexuality in the Time of AIDS, with Lytta Bassett. London: Continuum. ISBN 978-0-8264-9911-0
- Take the Plunge: Living Baptism and Confirmation. London: Burns & Oates, 2012. ISBN 978-1-4411-1848-6
- The Hope that is Within You: interviewed by Raymond Friel. Redemptorist Publications. April 2016. ISBN 9780852314630
- Alive in God: A Christian Imagination. London: Bloomsbury Continuum 2019 ISBN 978-1-4729-7020-6

=== Articles ===
- "I was hungry and you gave me food". The Tablet. 264 (8856): 17. 7 August 2010.

=== Letters to the Order ===
- Vowed to Mission (1994)
- The Wellspring of Hope. Study and the Annunciation of the Good News (1996)
- The Identity of Religious Today (1996)
- Dominican Freedom and Responsibility. Towards a Spirituality of Government (1997)
- The Bear and the Nun : What is the Sense of Religious Life Today! (1998)
- The Promise of Life (1998)
- The Rosary (1998)
- Letter to our Brothers and Sisters in Initial Formation (1999)
- To Praise, to Bless, to Preach. The Mission of the Dominican Family (2000)
- The Throne of God (2000)
- St Catherine of Siena (1347–1380), Patroness of Europe (2000)
- The Parable of the Good Samaritan (2001)
- A City set on a hilltop cannot be hidden: A Contemplative Life (2001)
- Mission to a Runaway World: Future Citizens of the Kingdom (2002).

== See also ==
- Catholic Church in the United Kingdom
- Cardinals created by Pope Francis
- Radcliffe baronets

== Notes ==
Catholic Church titles
Preceded by Damian Byrne	Master-General of the Dominican Order; 1992–2001	Succeeded by Carlos Azpiroz Costa
Preceded by Luigi De Magistris	Cardinal-Deacon of Nomi di Gesù e Maria in via Lata; 2024–present	Incumbent
