= San Nicola da Tolentino agli Orti Sallustiani =

- Church of Nicholas of Tolentino at the Gardens of Sallust
- Chiesa di San Nicola da Tolentino
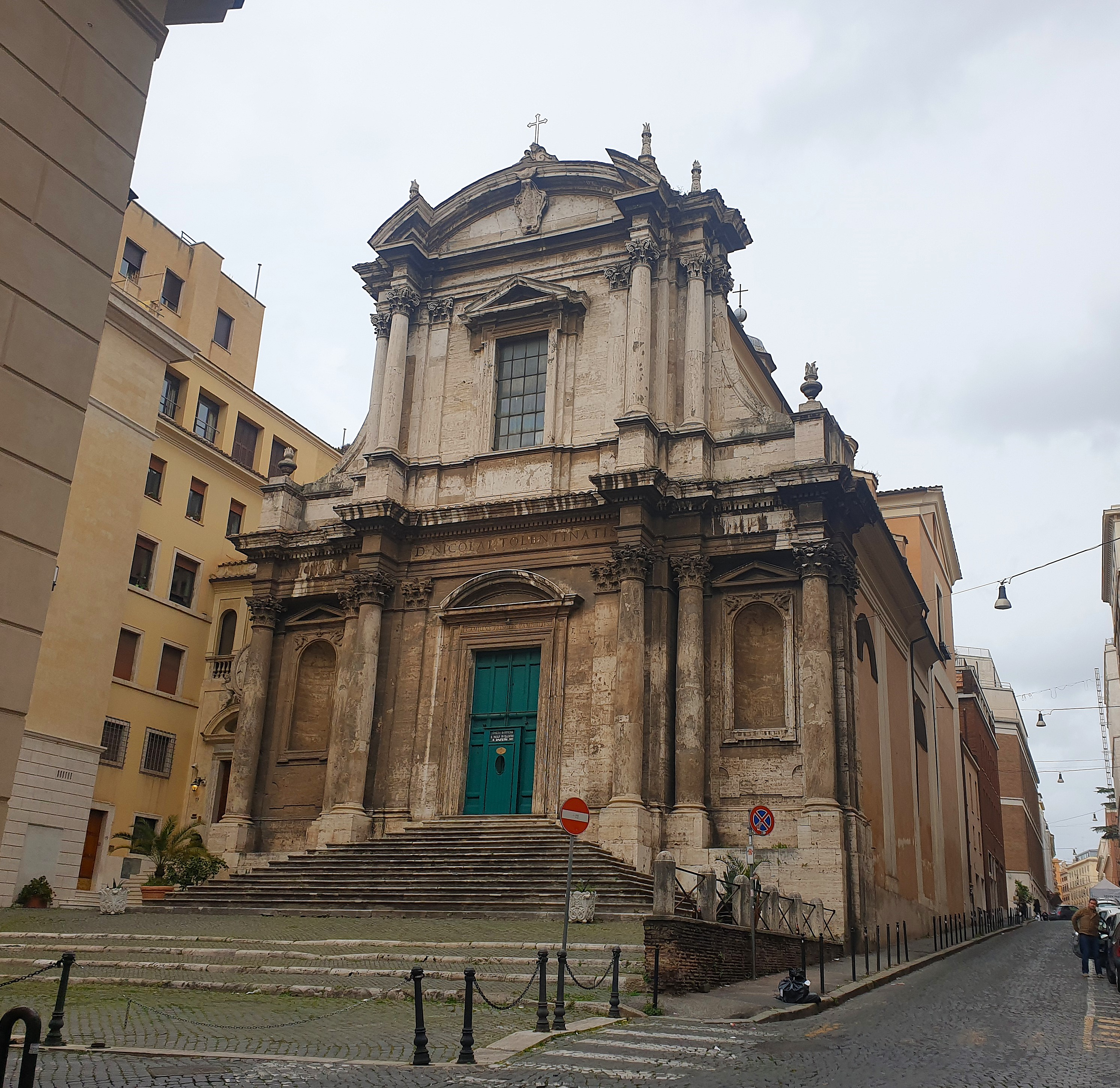
- Click on the map for a fullscreen view
- 41°54′19″N 12°29′28″E
- Location: Salita di San Nicola da Tolentino 17, Trevi, Rome
- Country: Italy
- Language: Armenian
- Denomination: Catholic Church
- Sui iuris church: Armenian Catholic Church
- Tradition: Armenian Rite
- Website: sannicoladatolentino.org

History
- Status: national church
- Founded: 1599
- Dedication: Nicholas of Tolentino

Architecture
- Functional status: Active
- Architect: Alessandro Algardi
- Architectural type: Baroque
- Groundbreaking: 1599

Administration
- Diocese: Rome

Not be confused with the church of San Nicolò da Tolentino in Venice, the Basilica di San Nicola in the town of Tolentino in the province of Macerata, or the Oratorio di San Nicola da Tolentino in Vicenza.

San Nicola da Tolentino agli Orti Sallustiani (Italian: Saint Nicholas of Tolentino in the Gardens of Sallust) is a church in Rome. It is referred to in both Melchiori's and Venuti's guides as San Niccolò di Tolentino, and in the latter it adds the suffix a Capo le Case. It is one of the two Roman national churches of Armenia. The church was built for the Discalced Augustinians in 1599, and originally dedicated to the 13th century Augustinian friar Saint Nicholas of Tolentino.

== History ==
The interior was refurbished during 1614–1620 by Carlo Buti and Martino Longhi, supported by patronage by the Pamphilj family. The Milanese architect Francesco Buzio was also involved in the redesign. Starting in 1654, again with Pamphilj patronage, the church was rebuilt with designs by Giovanni Maria Baratta, one of the main pupils of Alessandro Algardi. In 1883, the church was given to the Pontifical Armenian College by Pope Leo XIII. The Armenian Catholic Church is in full communion with the Roman Catholic Church.

== Interior ==
The main altarpiece of San Giovanni Battista is by Baciccio. The sculpture of the Madonna with Child offering the Miraculous Bread to Saint Nicholas, Saint Augustine and Saint Monica over the main altar was completed by Domenico Guidi with Angels by Baratta. The surrounding stucco-work is by Ercole Ferrata. The high altar was based on a design by Algardi.

The first chapel on the right has a depiction of Miracle by Saint Nicholas of Bari (1710) by Filippo Laurenzi. The Annunciation is by Pughelli, and the lateral canvases by Giovanni Ventura Borghesi.

In the second chapel on the right is an altarpiece by Lazzaro Baldi.

In the third chapel on the right side is the sepulchral monument of Cardinal Federico Lante delle Rovere, with paintings by Pietro Paolo Baldini.

The third chapel on the left, the Gavotti chapel, was designed in 1668 by Pietro da Cortona who began the ceiling fresco work, although after his death, it was finished by Ciro Ferri. The chapel was dedicated to the Madonna of Savona. The sculptural relief at the altar of the Apparition of the Blessed Virgin of Savona to Blessed Anthony Botta was completed by Cosimo Fancelli, and statues of Saint Joseph by Ercole Ferrata and Saint John the Baptist by Antonio Raggi.

The second chapel on the left, the Buratti chapel, was designed by Giovanni Battista Mola, the father of Pier Francesco Mola.

THe first chapel on the right has a St Phillip Neri painted by Cristofaro Creo.

The dome is octagonal, with eight windows. The cupola is frescoed (1643) by Pietro Paolo Baldini and depicts four female angels symbolising the four fundamental virtues of the Augustinian Order: Chastity, Humility, Poverty and Obedience. There is also a fresco depicting Glory of Saint Nicholas of Tolentino by Giovanni Coli and Filippo Gherardi. The Sant'Agnese altarpiece to the left of the crossing is a copy of a Guercino original found in the Doria Gallery.

There is a memorial in the right side of the chapel of Saint Gregory the Illuminator; his cardinalitial hat hangs from the ceiling of the church.

== Gallery ==
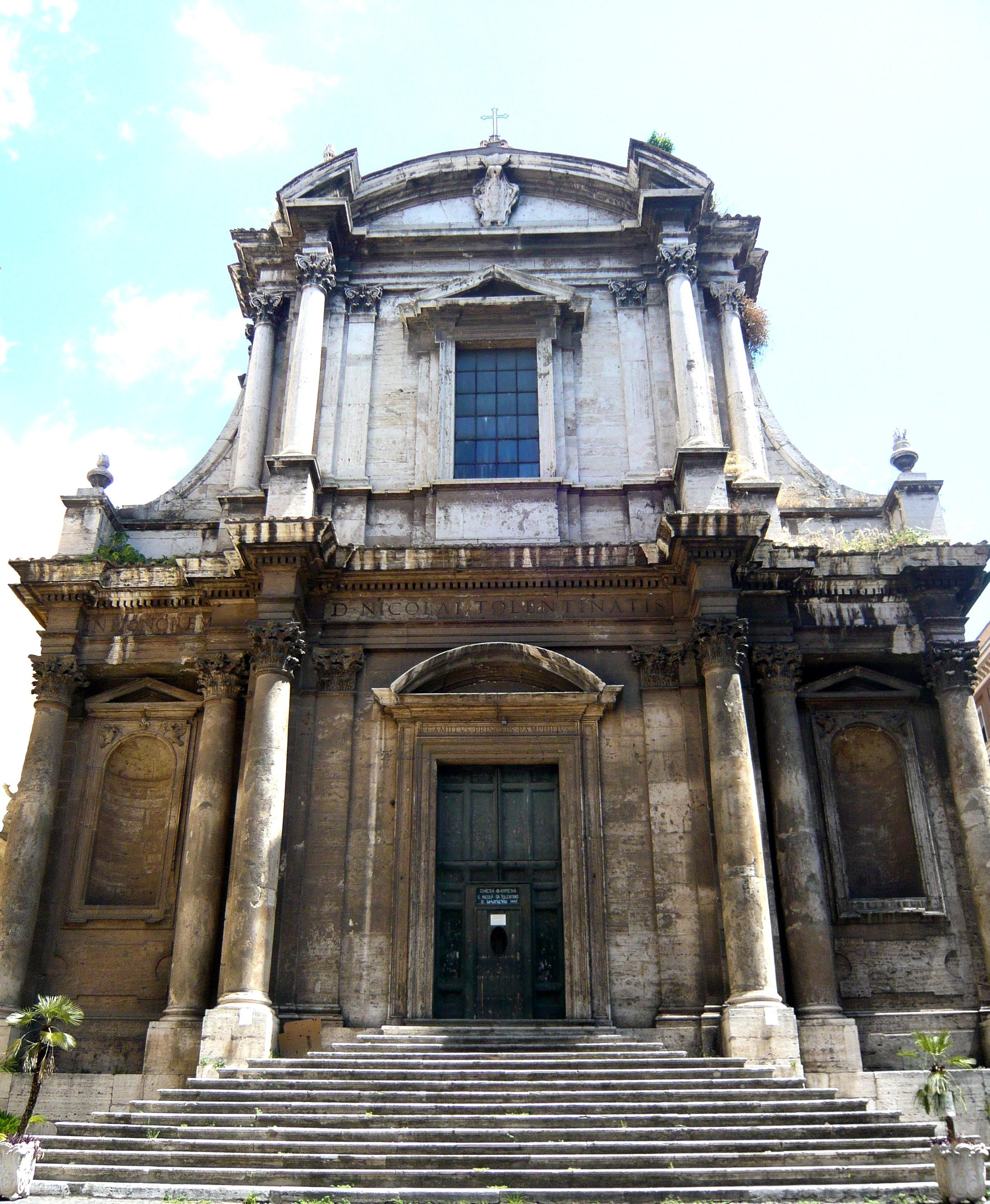
Facade

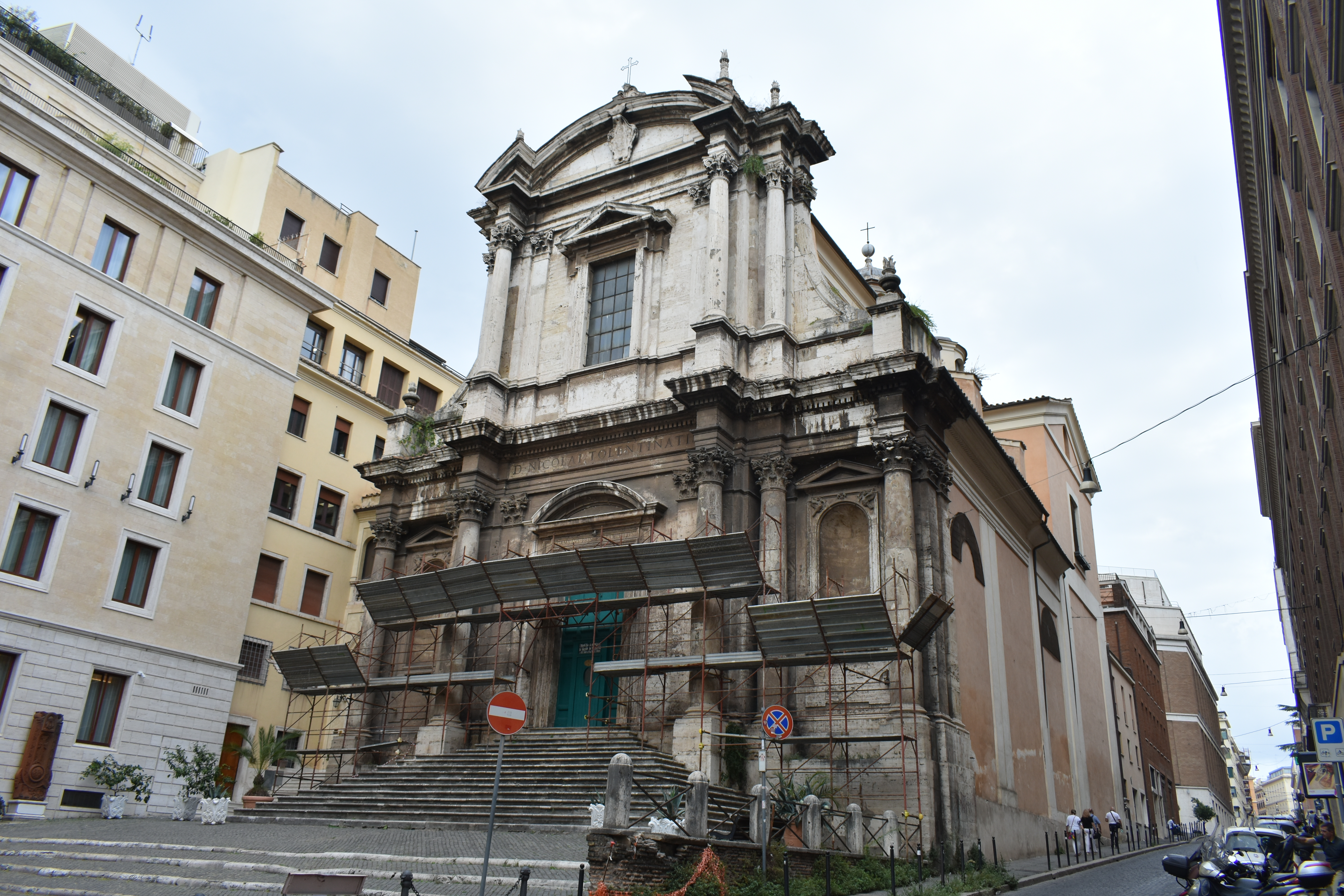

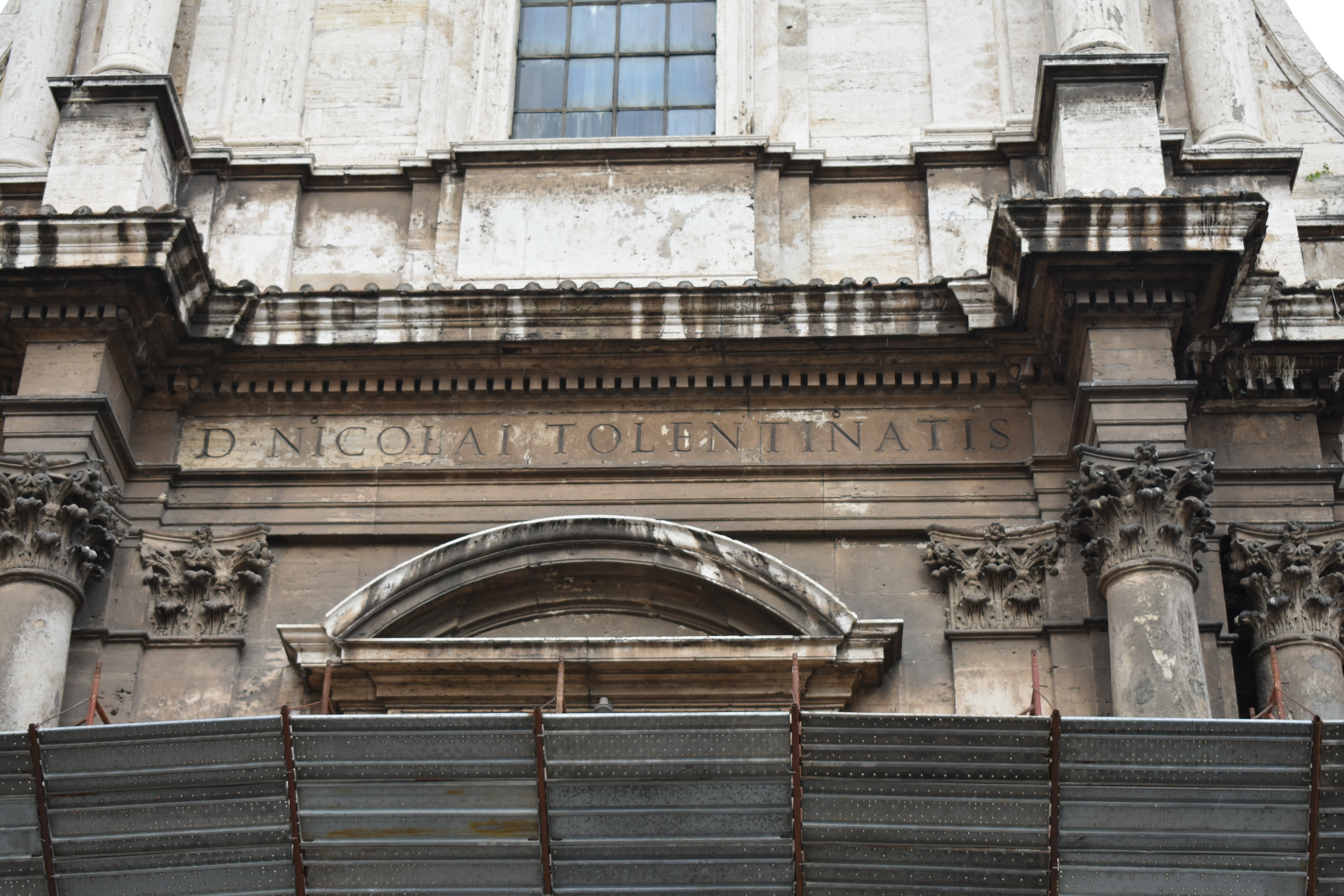

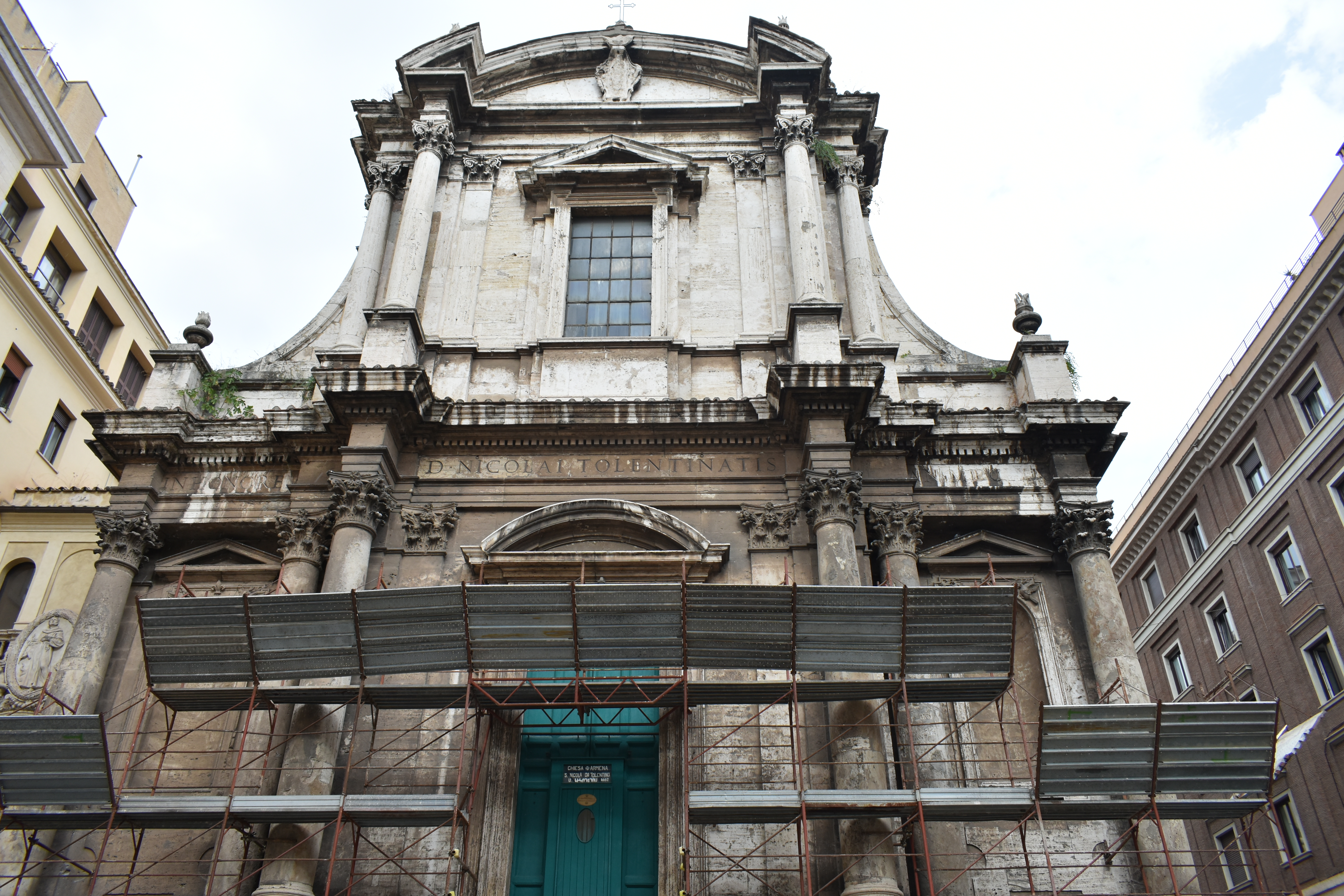
