= Pietro Paolo Baldini =

Italian painter

Pietro Paolo Baldini (1614?-1684?) was an Italian painter of the Baroque period.

== Biography ==
Lived around the middle of the 17th century, the place of both birth and death is not known. Baldini was never taken into consideration by critics: only Lanzi (1789) pronounced a judgment on the basis of the works seen in the churches of Rome and, in particular, in St. Eustachio. He was active in the mid-17th century in Rome, emerging as a pupil and one of the most faithful followers of Pietro da Cortona's style. He was nicknamed il Cortona, and sometimes called Pietro Paolo Ubaldini. He painted frescoes (1643) for the Lante Chapel of the church of San Nicola da Tolentino, Rome. However, Baldini's works were not limited by Cortonesca culture, with "a precision that knew another school", as Lanzi pointed out, a school that declares itself unequivocally in Emilia.
