= Lytta Bassett =

Swiss philosopher and Protestant theologian

Docteur Lytta Basset
- Church: Swiss Reformed Church

Personal details
- Born: 25 April 1950 (age 76) Raiatea
- Denomination: Swiss Reformed Church
- Residence: Neuchâtel
- Occupation: Pastor, academic, theologian, philosopher

Lytta Basset (born 25 April 1950) is a Swiss philosopher and Protestant theologian. She is the author of several works that have reached a wide audience, especially her 2002 book Sainte Colère, released in 2007 in English translation as Holy Anger.

Basset was born in Raiatea in French Polynesia. She studied philosophy and theology in Strasbourg before serving as a pastor in the Reformed Church at Geneva. She later worked in India, Iran, Djibouti and the United States, before returning to Geneva to complete a doctorate. She later became a professor of Practical Theology in the Faculty of Theology of the University of Neuchâtel.

Basset writes primarily in French, but various of her books have been translated into Dutch, English, German, Italian and Portuguese. Christians and Sexuality in the Time of AIDS (2008) was co-authored with English theologian Timothy Radcliffe. She was awarded the 2003 Prix Siloë Pèlerin for the original French edition of Holy Anger, the 2007 Prix de littérature religieuse for Au-delà du pardon ("Beyond forgiveness"), and the Prix du livre de spiritualité Panorama-La Procure for Aimer sans dévorer ("Loving without Devouring"). Her 2007 book Ce lien qui ne meurt jamais ("The bond that never dies") was written in response to the 2001 suicide of her 24-year-old son.

As of 2017, Lytta Basset edits the University of Neuchâtel's international theology journal, La chair et le souffle. She is also a political activist, associated with a number of movements in favour of sustainable development and against violence.

== Bibliography ==
- Le pardon originel: de l'abîme du mal au pouvoir de pardonner, Éditions du Cerf, 1994
- Traces vives: paroles liturgiques pour aujourd'hui (avec Francine Carrillo et Suzanne Schell), Éd. Labor et Fides, 1997
- Le pouvoir de pardonner, Éditions Albin Michel, 1999
- Guérir du malheur, Éditions Albin Michel, 1999
- La fermeture à l'amour: un défi pratique posé à la théologie, Éd. Labor et Fides, 2000
- Holy Anger, Continuum, 2007, ISBN 978-0-8264-8072-9. (French edition Sainte Colère, 2002)
- «Moi, je ne juge personne»: l'Évangile au-delà de la morale, Éditions Albin Michel, 2003
- Émergence, Éd. Bayard, 2004
- La Joie imprenable, Éditions Albin Michel, 2004 (discussion in the magazine Esprit & Vie)
- Au-delà du pardon: le désir de tourner la page, Presses de la Renaissance, 2006
- Ce lien qui ne meurt jamais, Éditions Albin Michel, 2007.
- Christians and Sexuality in the Time of AIDS, with Timothy Radcliffe. London: Continuum. ISBN 978-0-8264-9911-0
- Apprendre à être heureux, Éditions Albin Michel, 2008
- Aimer sans dévorer, Éditions Albin Michel, 2010
- Oser la bienveillance, Éditions Albin Michel, 2014.
