= Lorenzo Ottoni =

Italian sculptor

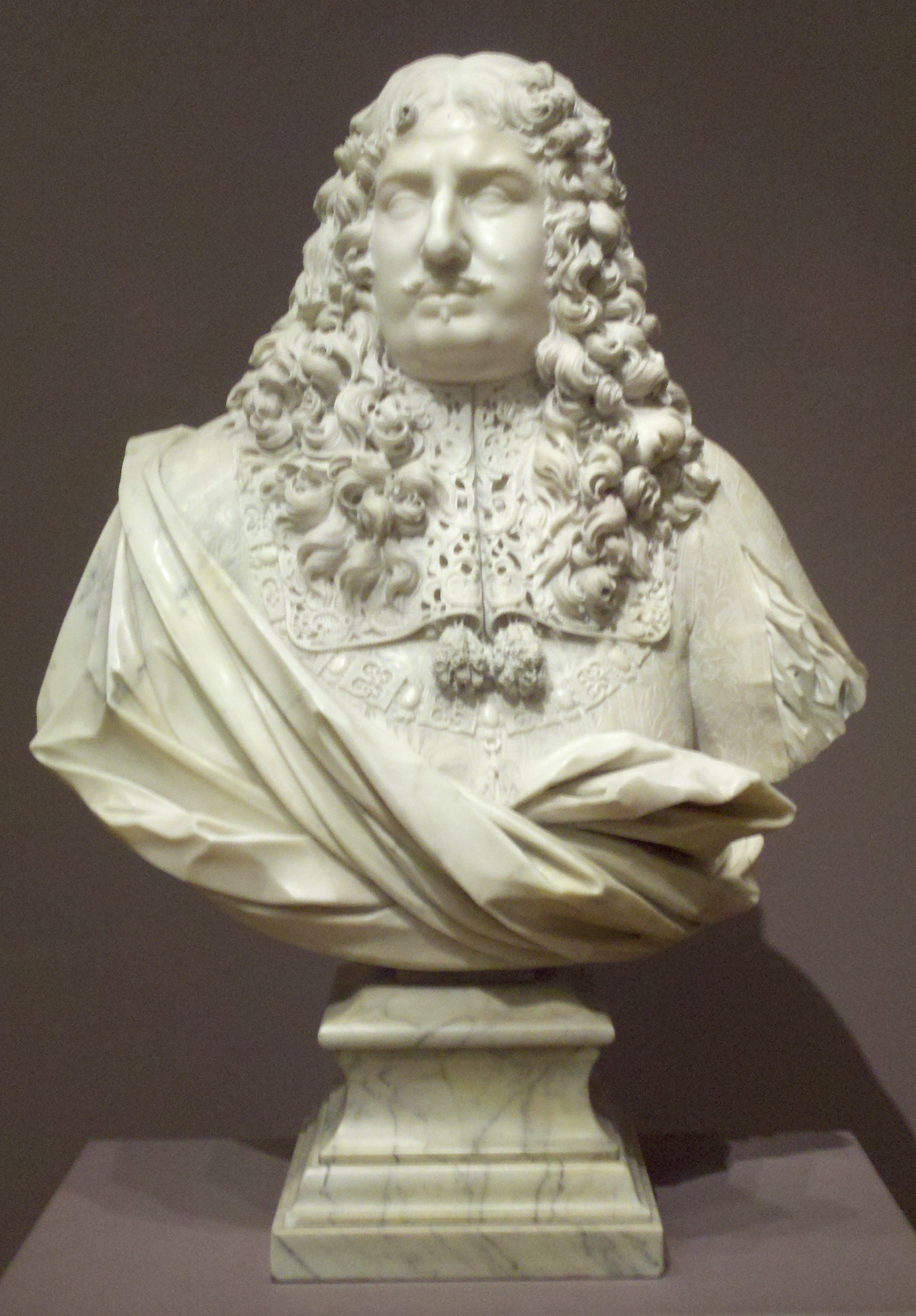
Bust of Maffeo Barberini c. 1685

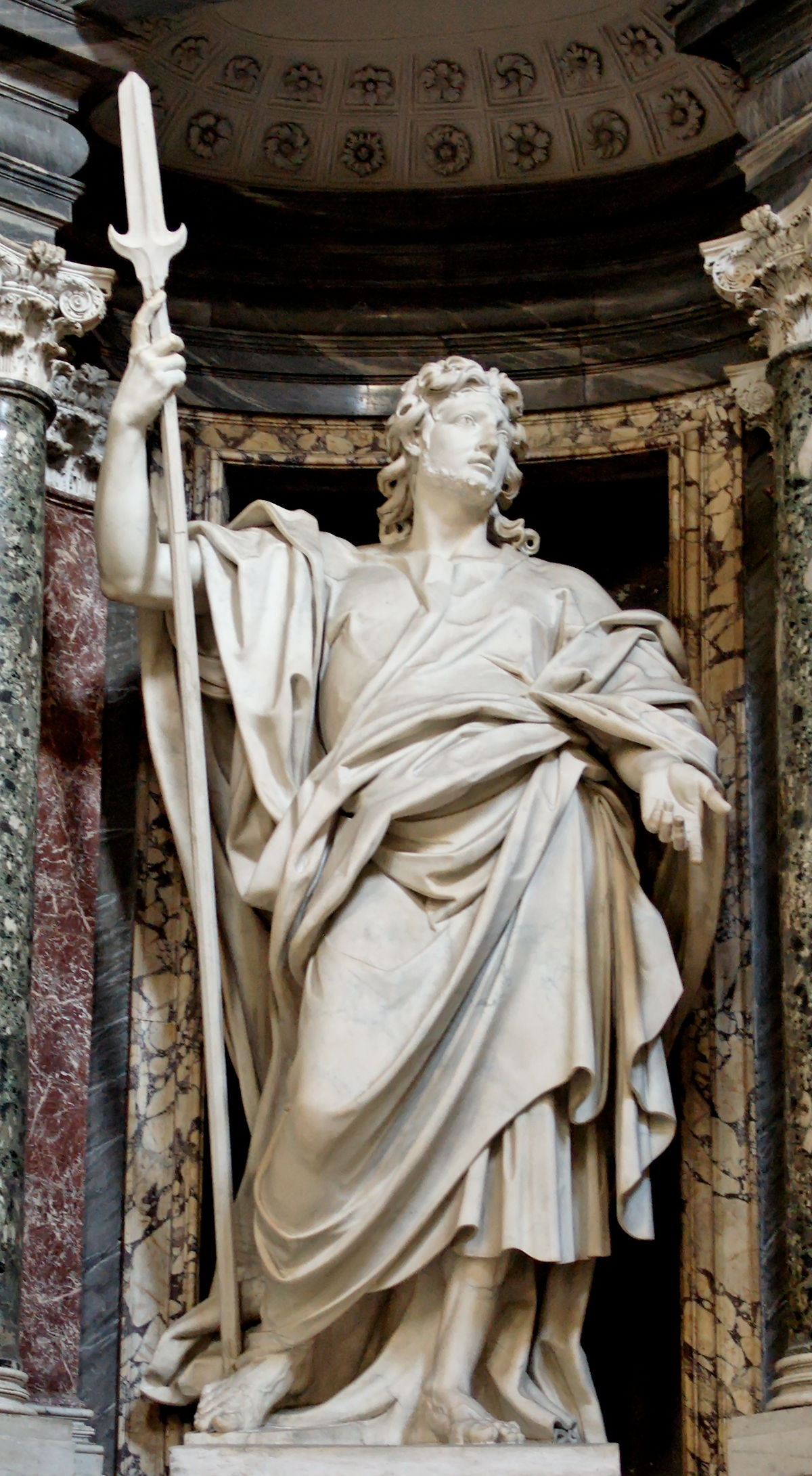
Sculpture of Thaddeus (Jude the Apostle) in the Basilica of St. John Lateran.

Lorenzo Ottoni, also known as Lorenzo Ottone or Lorenzone, (1658–1736) was an Italian sculptor who was commissioned by the papacy and various noble houses of Renaissance Italy.

== Life ==
Ottoni was born in Rome, Papal States in 1658 and spent the majority of his life in the city.

He trained at the famous studio of Ercole Ferrata and later opened his own studio which counted Bernardino Cametti among its students. His large number of assistants meant he was also able to complete commissions outside Rome.

He is best known for his Baroque religious sculptures of the Counter-Reformation renovation of Rome. He also created sculptural portraits of high-ranking church officials of his time. Ottoni benefitted greatly from his Catholic contemporaries; enthusiastic patrons of the arts.

Ottoni received many commissions from the powerful Barberini family during the 1670s and 1680s. These include marble sculptural portraits of Cardinal Francesco Barberini, Cardinal Antonio Barberini and their nephew Maffeo Barberini, as well as busts of Barberini Pope Urban VIII and Pope Alexander VIII.

Between the 1690s and about 1718, using bronze and stucco, he contributed to the sculptural decoration of the Chapel of the Baptisterium, transept, and chapels at St. Peter's Basilica, the chapel of Sant'Ignazio in the church of Il Gesù and the Basilica of St. John Lateran. He also sculpted two white marble putti which are part of the monument of Christina, Queen of Sweden in St. Peter's Basilica.

Ottoni was elected in 1691 to the Accademia di San Luca in Rome and a short time later to the Congregazione dei Virtuosi al Pantheon (Assembly of Illustrious Artists), Rome's two most prestigious artists' organizations.

A bust of Cardinal Stefano Agostini by Lorenzo Ottoni is in the Forlì Pinacoteca Civica.
