= Domenico Guidi =

Italian sculptor

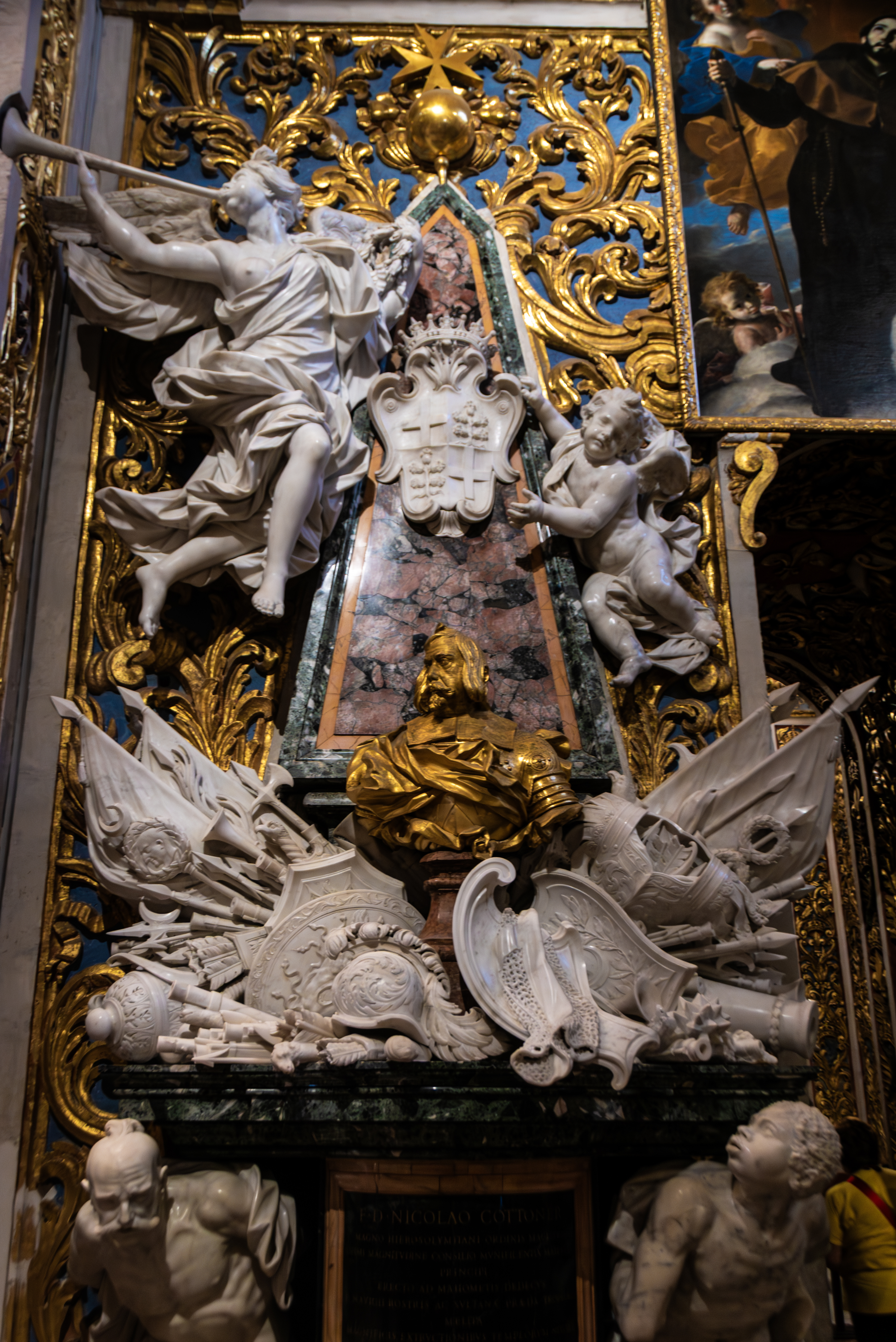
Monument to Grand Master Nicolas Cotoner by Domenico Guidi, at the Chapel of Aragon, St John's Co-Cathedral.

Domenico Guidi (1625 – 28 March 1701) was a prominent Italian Baroque sculptor.

Born in Carrara, Guidi followed his uncle, Giuliano Finelli, a prominent sculptor noted for his feud with Bernini, to Naples. When he fled Naples in 1647 during Masaniello's revolt, in Rome he joined the studio of Bernini's main competitor Alessandro Algardi with whom he remained until his master's death. While in Algardi's studio, he worked on projects with another pupil, Ercole Ferrata. For example, both helped complete their master's unfinished Vision of Saint Nicholas (completed 1655) at the church of San Nicola da Tolentino.

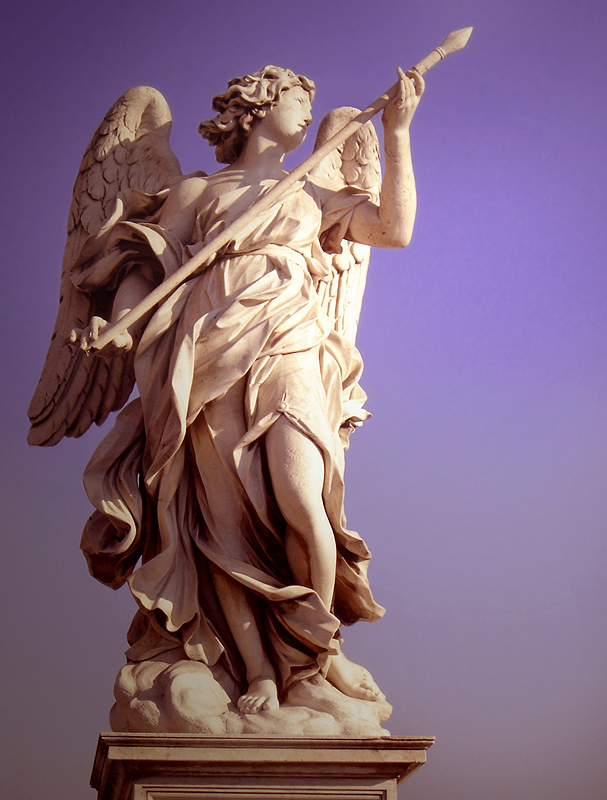
Angel with the lance

Guidi gained independence with Algardi's passing in 1654. He also worked closely with the French sculptor in Rome, Pierre-Etienne Monnot. Relative to sculptors of other major studios, he was prolific. His works include the Monument to Natale Rondinini in Santa Maria del Popolo (1657) and the relief over the altar of Capella di Monte di Pieta showing a Lamentation over the dead body of Christ (1667–76).

A great supporter of the French Academy in Rome, Guidi had the honour to produce a marble group flattering Louis XIV entitled La Renommée écrivant l'histoire du Roi which was sent to Versailles and placed in the park of the château.

Guidi has Algardi's competence in carving and his figures show the classical emotional detachment, but the designs are uninspired when compared to his Master. He was awarded one commission directed by Bernini, the sculpting of one of the angels for the Ponte Sant'Angelo.

== Sources ==
- Wittkower, Rudolph (1980). Art and Architecture in Italy, 1600-1750. Pelican History of Art (Penguin Books Ltd). pp. 312–314.
- Bruce Boucher (1998). Thames & Hudson, World of Art (ed.). Italian Baroque Sculpture. p. 155.
