= Alessandro Algardi =

Italian sculptor (1598–1654)

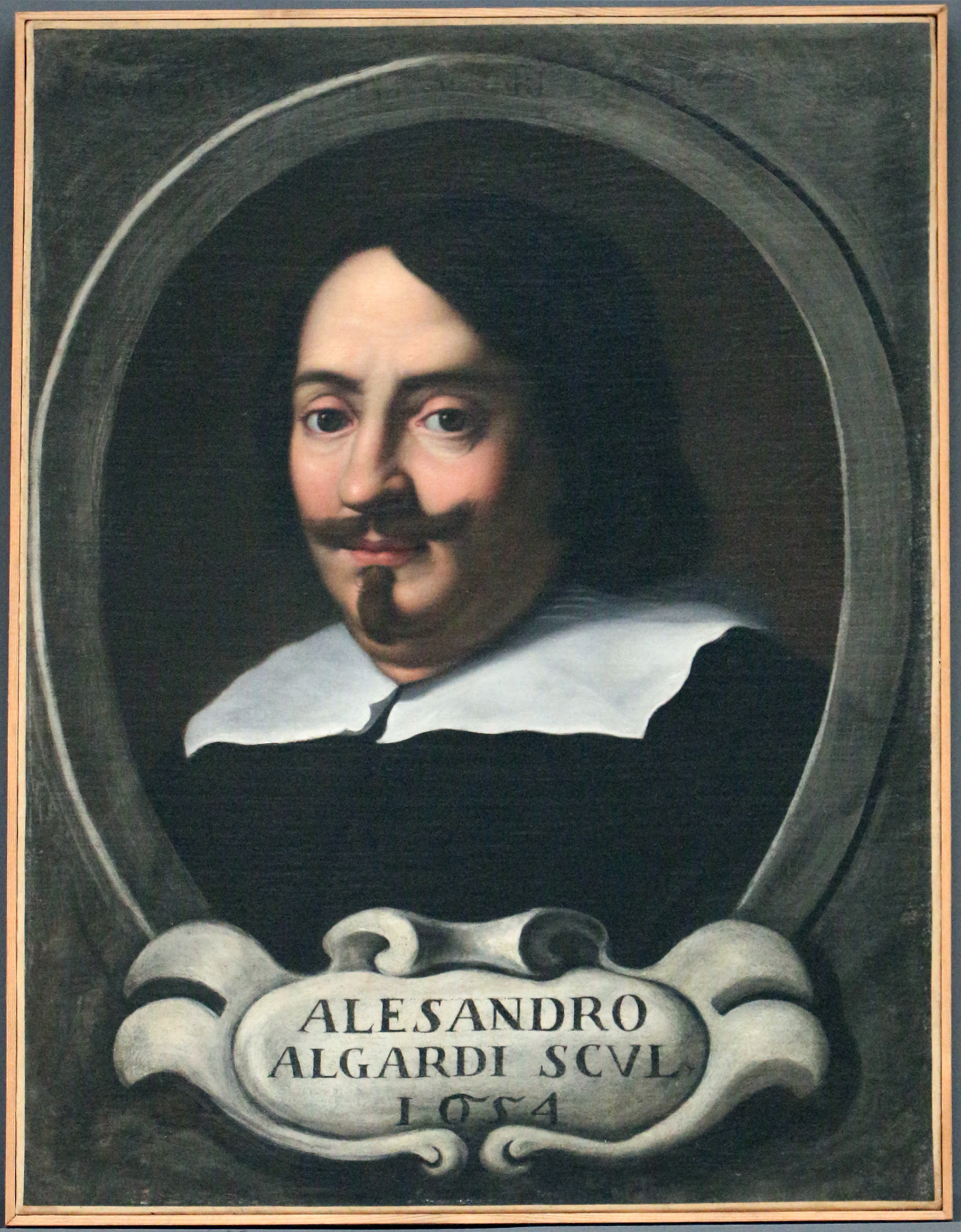
- Anonymous portrait of Alessandro Algardi, 1654, Accademia di San Luca, Rome
- Born: 31 July 1595; Bologna, Papal States
- Died: 10 June 1654 (aged 58); Rome, Papal States
- Education: Agostino Carracci
- Known for: Sculpture
- Notable work: Algardi Firedogs; Rest on the Flight into Egypt; Statue of Carlo Barberini
- Movement: Baroque

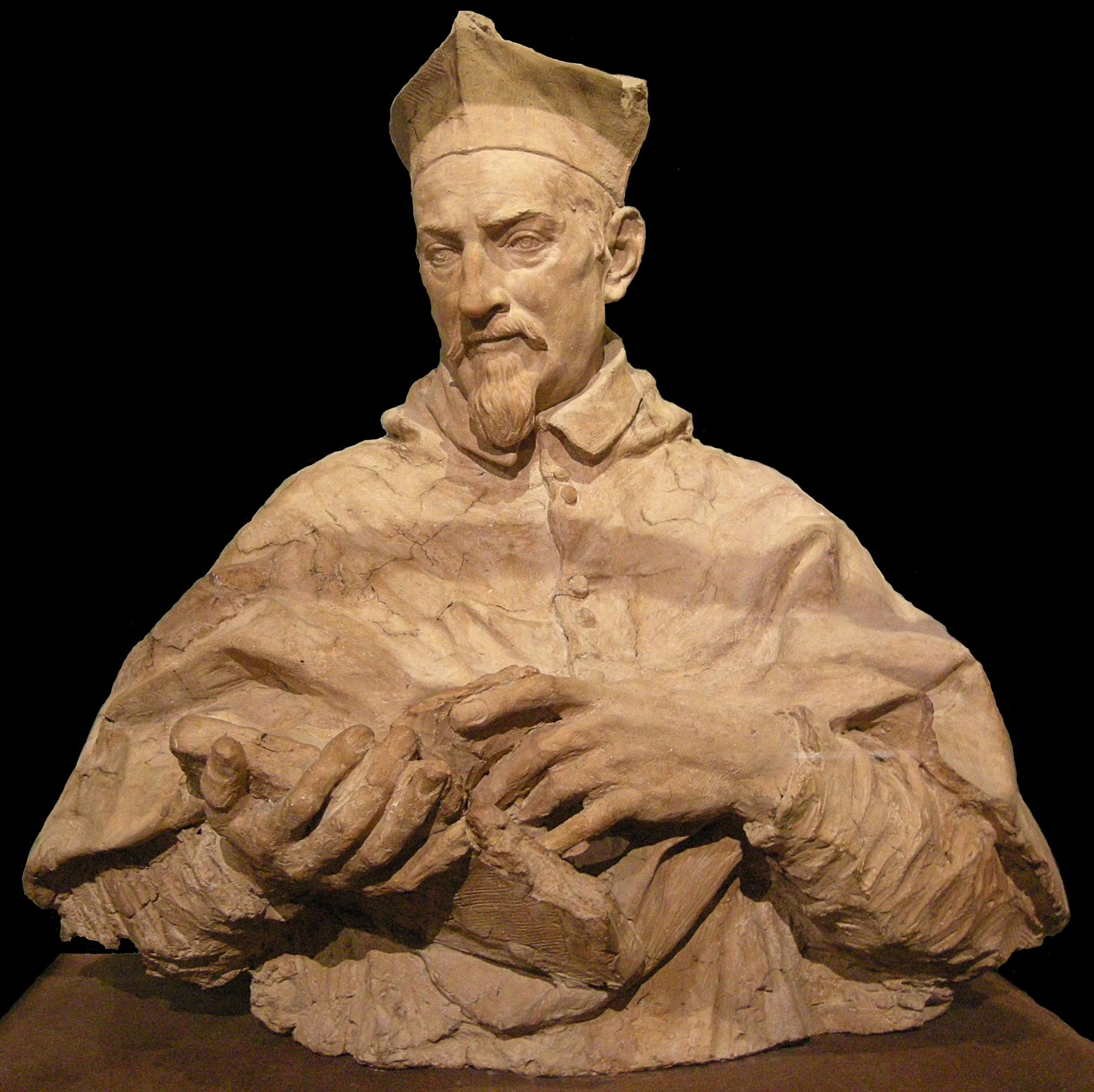
Terracotta modello of Cardinal Paolo Emilio Zacchia, c. 1650

Alessandro Algardi (31 July 1595 – 10 June 1654) was an Italian high-Baroque sculptor active almost exclusively in Rome. In the latter decades of his life, he was, along with Francesco Borromini and Pietro da Cortona, one of the major rivals of Gian Lorenzo Bernini in Rome. He is now most admired for his portrait busts that have great vivacity and dignity.

== Early years ==
Algardi was born in Bologna, where at a young age, he was apprenticed in the studio of Agostino Carracci. However, his aptitude for sculpture led him to work for Giulio Cesare Conventi (1577–1640), an artist of modest talents. His two earliest known works date back to this period: two statues of saints, made of chalk, in the Oratory of Santa Maria della Vita in Bologna. By the age of twenty, Ferdinando I, Duke of Mantua, began commissioning works from him, and he was also employed by local jewelers for figurative designs. After a short residence in Venice, he went to Rome in 1625 with an introduction from the Duke of Mantua to the late pope's nephew, Cardinal Ludovico Ludovisi, who employed him for a time in the restoration of ancient statues. (Note: These restored statues still form the core of the Bonacorsi-Ludovisi collection in Palazzo Altemps. Sculpture restoration was a common employment for even the most prominent sculptors of his day, including Bernini and Ercole Ferrata.)

== Tomb of Pope Leo XI ==
Propelled by the Borghese and Barberini patronage, Gian Lorenzo Bernini and his studio garnered most of the major Roman sculptural commissions. For nearly a decade, Algardi struggled for recognition. In Rome he was aided by friends that included Pietro da Cortona and his fellow Bolognese, Domenichino. His early Roman commissions included terracotta and some marble portrait busts, (Note: His marble bust of Laudivio Zacchia, 1627, is in the Staatliche Museen, Berlin (illustrated)) while he supported himself with small works like crucifixes. In the 1630s he worked on the tombs of the Mellini family in the Mellini Chapel in Santa Maria del Popolo.

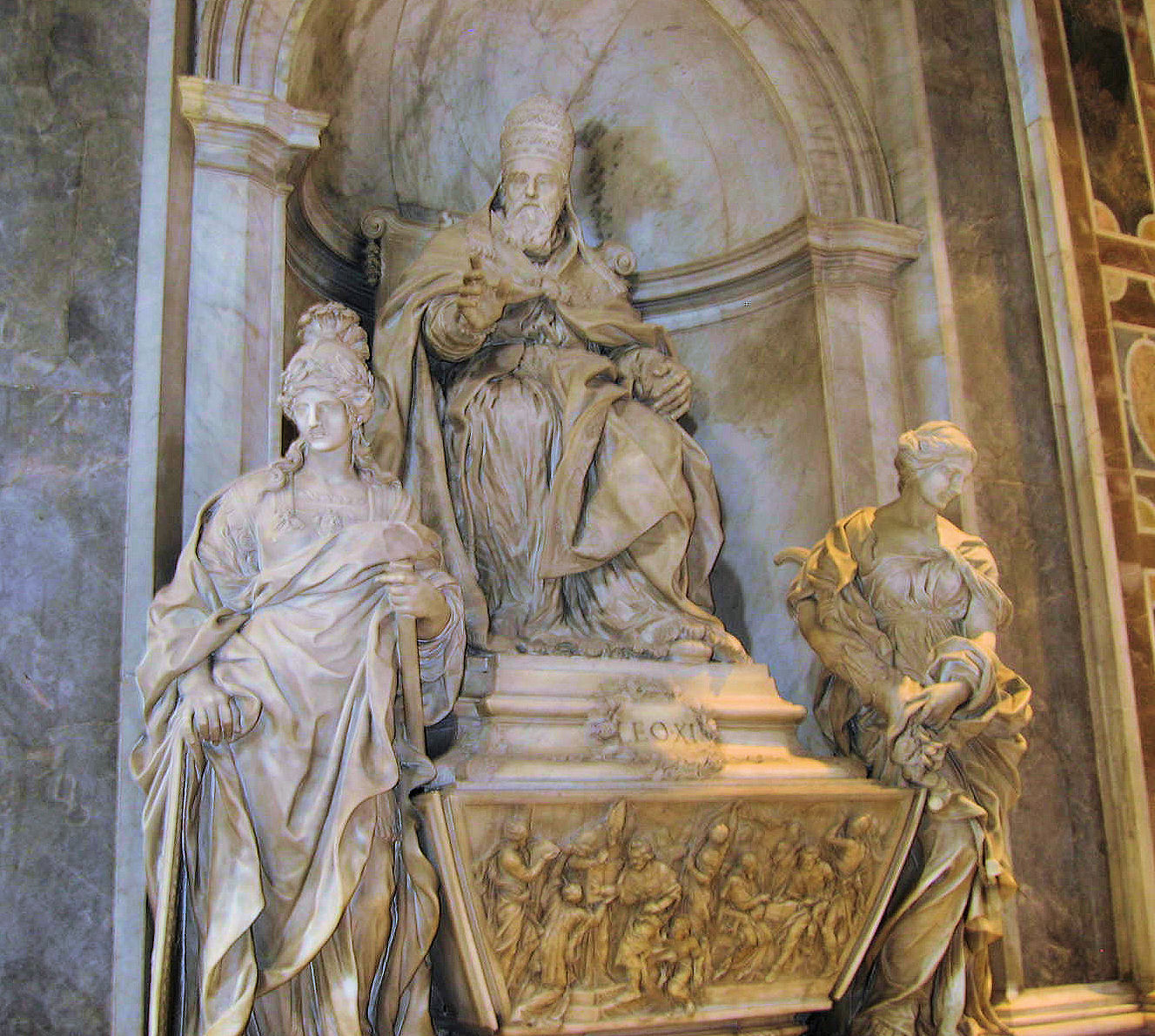
Tomb of Leo XI

Algardi's first major commission came about in 1634, when Cardinal Ubaldini (Medici) contracted for a funeral monument for his great-uncle, Pope Leo XI, the third of the Medici popes, who had reigned for less than a month in 1605. The monument was started in 1640, and mostly completed by 1644. The arrangement mirrors the one designed by Bernini for the Tomb of Urban VIII (1628–47), with a central hieratic sculpture of the pope seated in full regalia and offering a hand of blessing, while at his feet, two allegorical female figures flank his sarcophagus. However, in Bernini's tomb, the vigorous upraised arm and posture of the pope is counterbalanced by an active drama below, wherein the figures of Charity and Justice are either distracted by putti or lost in contemplation, while skeletal Death actively writes the epitaph. Algardi's tomb is much less dynamic. The allegorical figures of Magnanimity and Liberality have an impassive, ethereal dignity. Some have identified the helmeted figure of Magnanimity with that of Athena and iconic images of Wisdom. Liberality resembles Duquesnoy's famous Santa Susanna, but rendered with more elegance. The tomb is somberly monotone and lacks the polychromatic excitement that detracts from the elegiac mood of Urban VIII's tomb.

In 1635–38, Pietro Boncompagni commissioned from Algardi a colossal statue of Philip Neri with kneeling angels for Santa Maria in Vallicella, completed in 1640. Immediately after this, Algardi produced a sculptural group of the beheading of Saint Paul with two figures: a kneeling, resigned saint and the executioner poised to strike the sword-blow, for the church of San Paolo, Bologna. These works established his reputation, alongside two reliefs of The Martyrdom of St Paul and The Rest on the Flight into Egypt (a contemporary replica of the latter is now in the Victoria and Albert Museum). Like Bernini's characteristic works, they often express the Baroque aesthetic of depicting dramatic attitudes and emotional expressions, yet Algardi's sculpture has a restraining sobriety in contrast to those of his rival.

== Papal favour under Innocent X and Spanish commissions ==
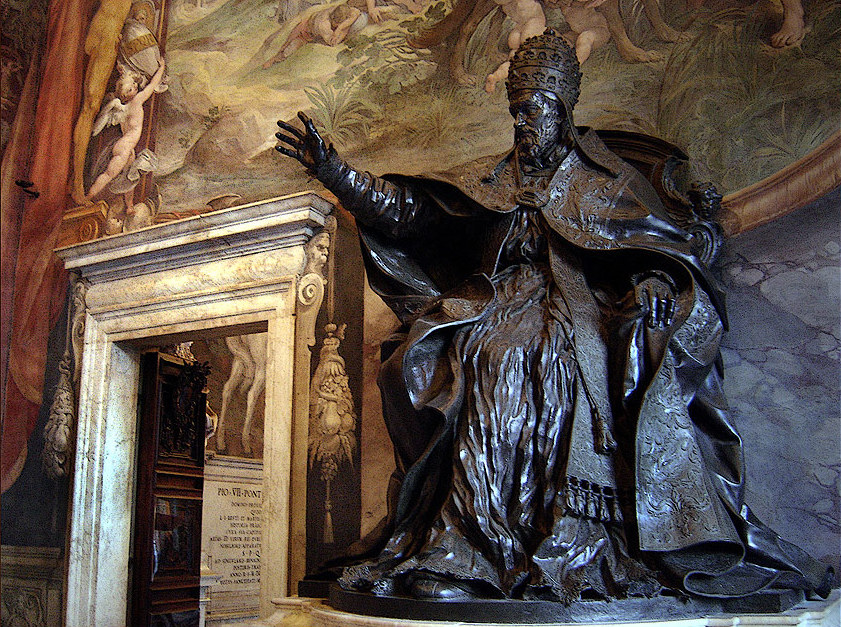
Pope Innocent X, Capitoline Museums.

With the death of the Barberini Pope Urban VIII in 1644 and the accession of the Pamphilj Pope Innocent X, the Barberini family and fell into disrepute, resulting in fewer commissions for Bernini. Algardi, on the other hand, was embraced by the new pope (Note: Algardi's official 1645 portrait statue of Innocent X is preserved in the Palazzo dei Conservatori on the Campidoglio.) and the pope's nephew, Camillo Pamphilj. (Note: His portrait bust of Camillo Pamphili, 1647, is at The Hermitage Museum, Saint Petersburg illustration.) Algardi's portraits were highly prized, and their formal severity contrasts with Bernini's more vivacious expression. (Note: Compare the prior images with Bernini's Urban VIII) A large hieratic bronze of Innocent X by Algardi is now to be found in the Capitoline Museums.

Algardi was not renowned for his architectural abilities. Although he was in charge of the project for the papal villa, the Villa Pamphili, now Villa Doria Pamphili, outside the Porta San Pancrazio in Rome, he may have had professional guidance on the design of the casino from the architect/engineer Girolamo Rainaldi and help with supervising its construction from his assistant Giovanni Francesco Grimaldi. The casino was a showcase for the Pamphili collection of sculpture, ancient and contemporary, on which Algardi was well able to advise. In the villa grounds, Algardi and his studio executed sculpture-encrusted fountains and other garden features, where some of his free-standing sculpture and bas-reliefs remain.

In 1650 Algardi met Diego Velázquez, who obtained commissions for his work from Spain. As a consequence there are four chimney-pieces by Algardi in the Royal Palace of Aranjuez, and in the gardens, the figures on the fountain of Neptune are also by him. The Augustinian monastery at Salamanca contains the tomb of the Count and Countess de Monterey, another work by Algardi.

== Fuga d'Attila relief ==
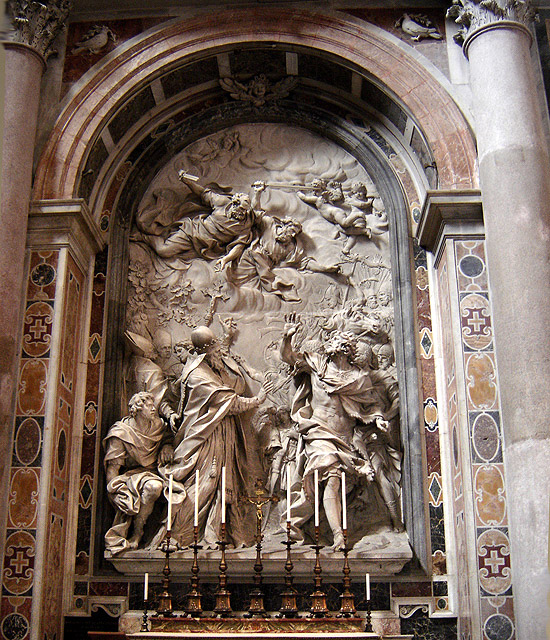
Fuga d'Attila, St. Peter's Basilica.

Algardi's large, dramatic, high-relief marble panel of Pope Leo and Attila, created from 1646 to 1653, is commonly referred to as Fuga d'Attila or Flight of Attila. It was created for St Peter's Basilica, and it reinvigorated the use of such marble reliefs. There had been large marble reliefs used previously in Roman churches, (Note: For example, Gian Lorenzo's father, Pietro Bernini's crowded Assumption of the Virgin for Santa Maria Maggiore (1606)) but for most patrons, sculpted marble altarpieces were far too costly. In this relief, the two principal figures, the stern and courageous pope and the dismayed and frightened Attila, surge forward from the center into three dimensions. Only they two see the descending angelic warriors rallying to the pope's defense, while all others in the background reliefs, persist in performing their respective earthly duties.

The subject was apt for a papal state seeking to increase its power, since it depicts the historical legend wherein Saint Leo the Great, the first pope to receive the epithet, with supernatural aid, deterred the Huns from looting Rome. From a baroque standpoint, the incident is common theme: a moment of divine intervention in the affairs of man. Algardi's patron's message through the relief would be that all viewers should be sternly reminded of the papal capacity to invoke divine retribution against enemies.

In his later years Algardi controlled a large studio and amassed a great fortune. Algardi's classicizing manner was carried on by pupils, including Ercole Ferrata and Domenico Guidi, and Antonio Raggi initially trained with him. The latter two completed his design for an altarpiece of the Vision of Saint Nicholas at San Nicola da Tolentino, Rome, using two separate marble pieces linked together in one event and place, yet successfully separating the divine and earthly spheres. Other lesser known assistants from his studio include Francesco Barrata, Girolamo Lucenti, and Giuseppe Peroni.

Algardi died in Rome within a year of completing his famous relief, which was admired by contemporaries.

== Critical assessment and legacy ==
Algardi was also known for his portraiture which shows an obsessive attention to details of psychologically revealing physiognomy in a sober but immediate naturalism, and minute attention to costume and draperies, such as in the busts of Laudivio Zacchia, Camillo Pamphilj, and of Muzio Frangipane and his two sons Lello and Roberto.

In temperament, his style was more akin to the classicized and restrained baroque of Duquesnoy than to the emotive works of other baroque artists. From an artistic point of view, he was most successful in portrait-statues and groups of children, where he was obliged to follow nature most closely. His terracotta models, some of them finished works of art, were prized by collectors. An outstanding series of terracotta models is at the Hermitage Museum, Saint Petersburg.

== Gallery ==
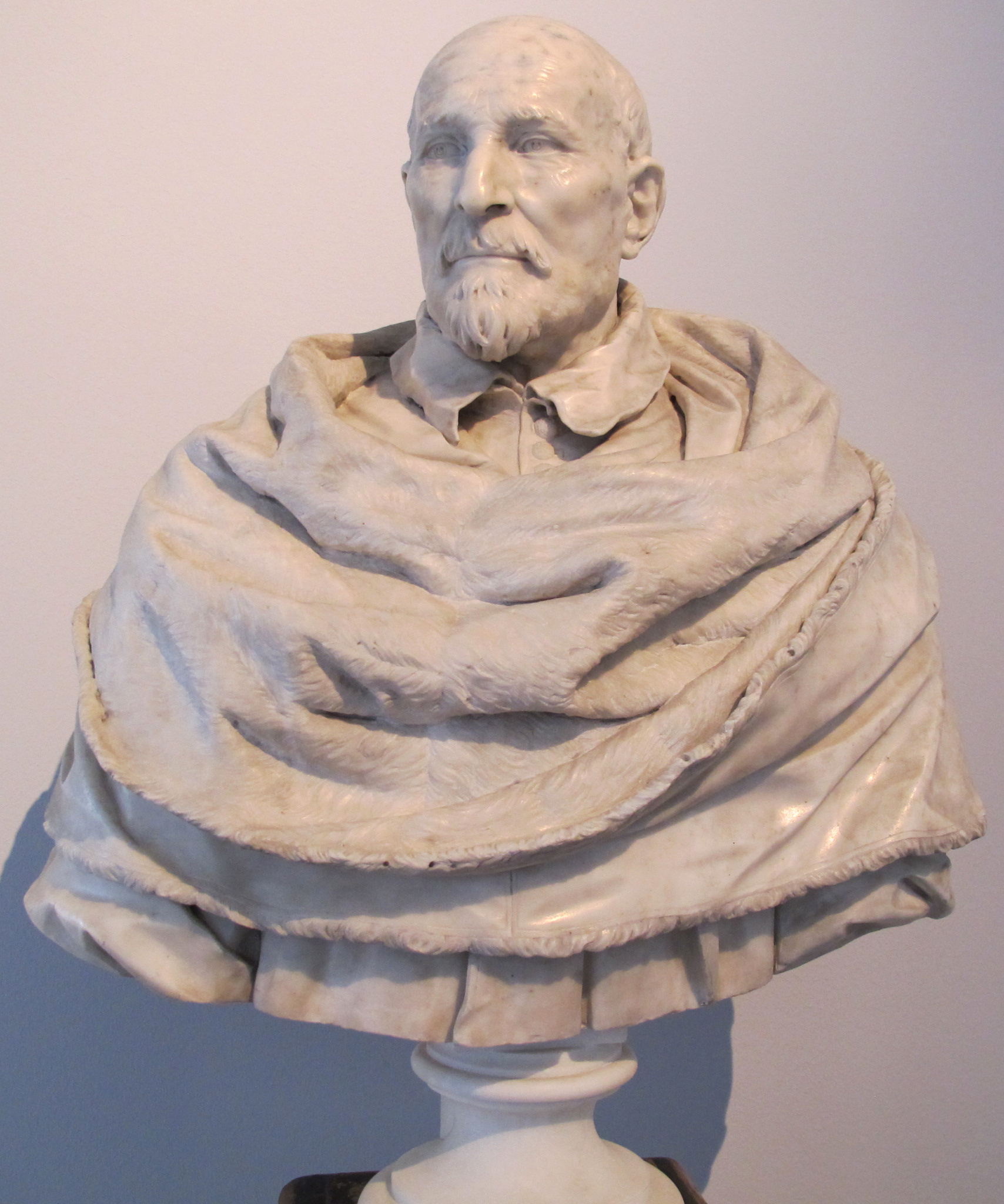
A Gentleman

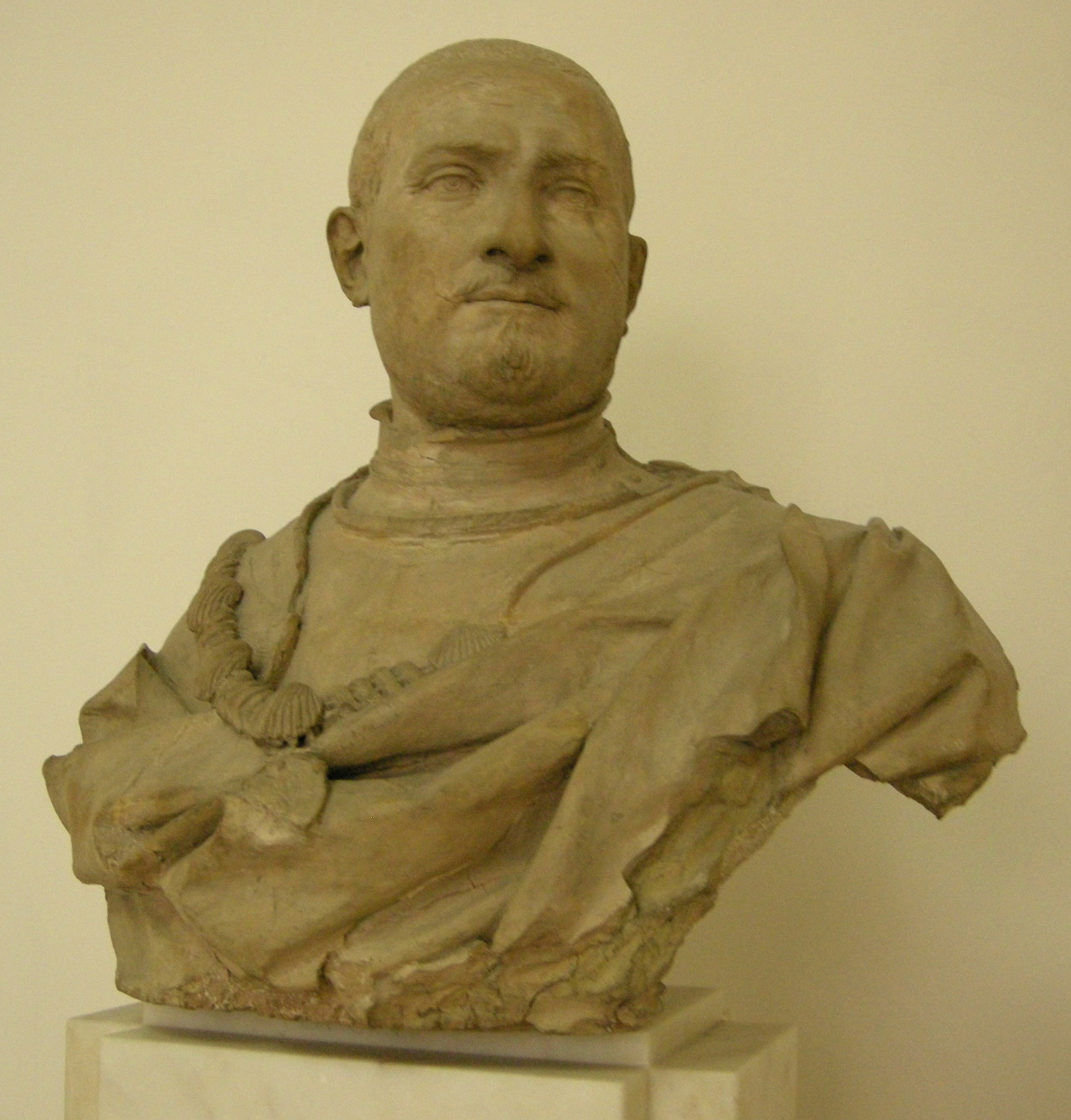
Maurizio Frangipane

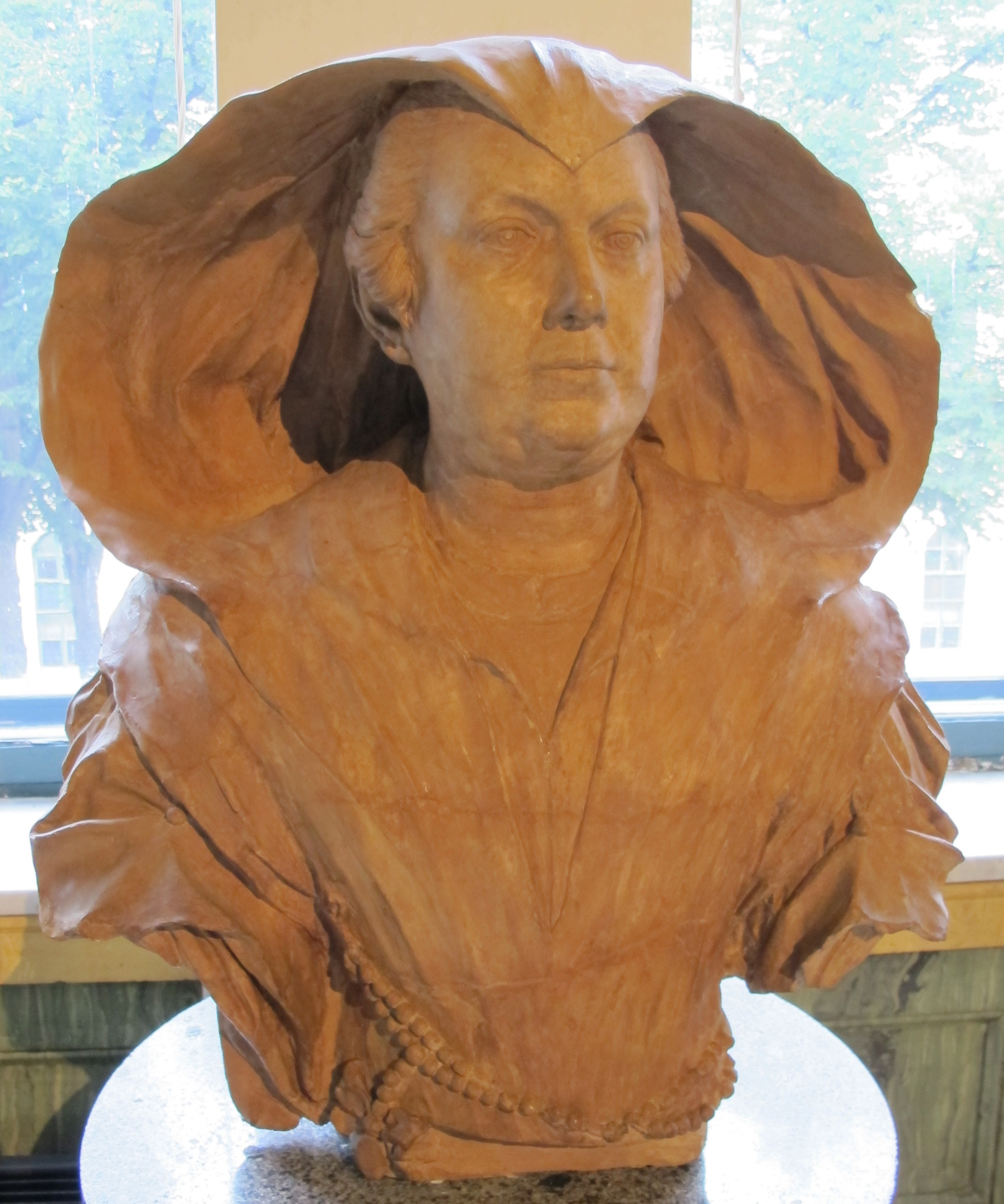
Olimpia Pamphili

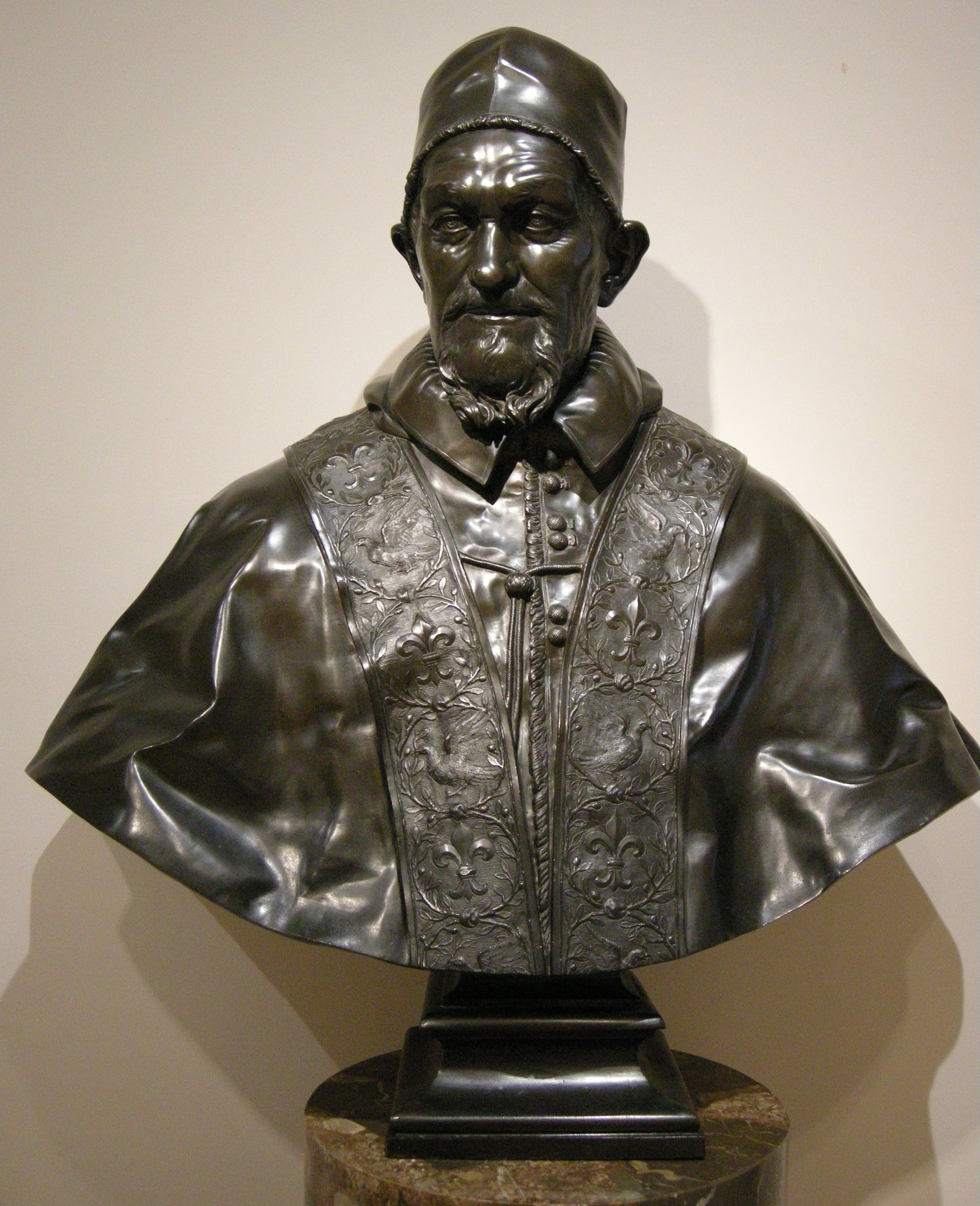
Pope Innocent X

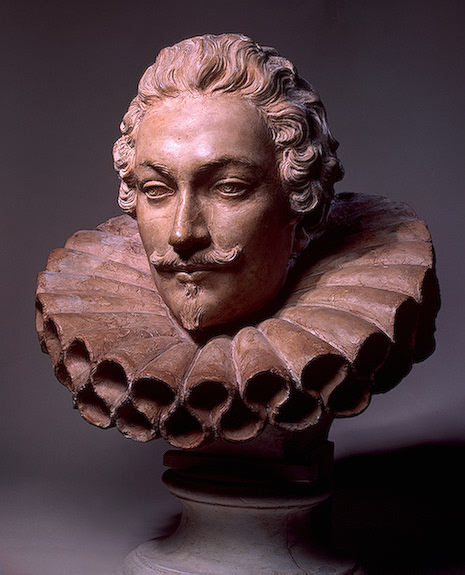
Camillo Pamphili

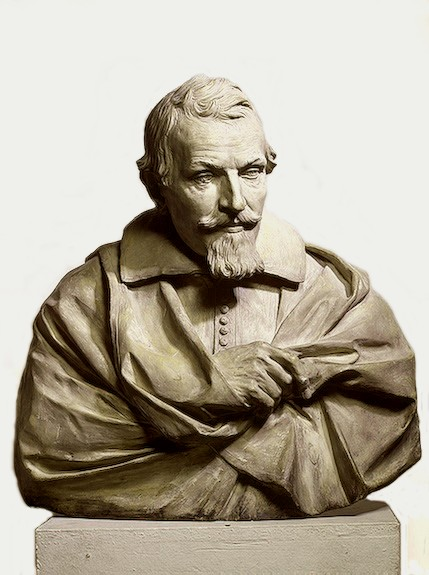
Gasparo Molo

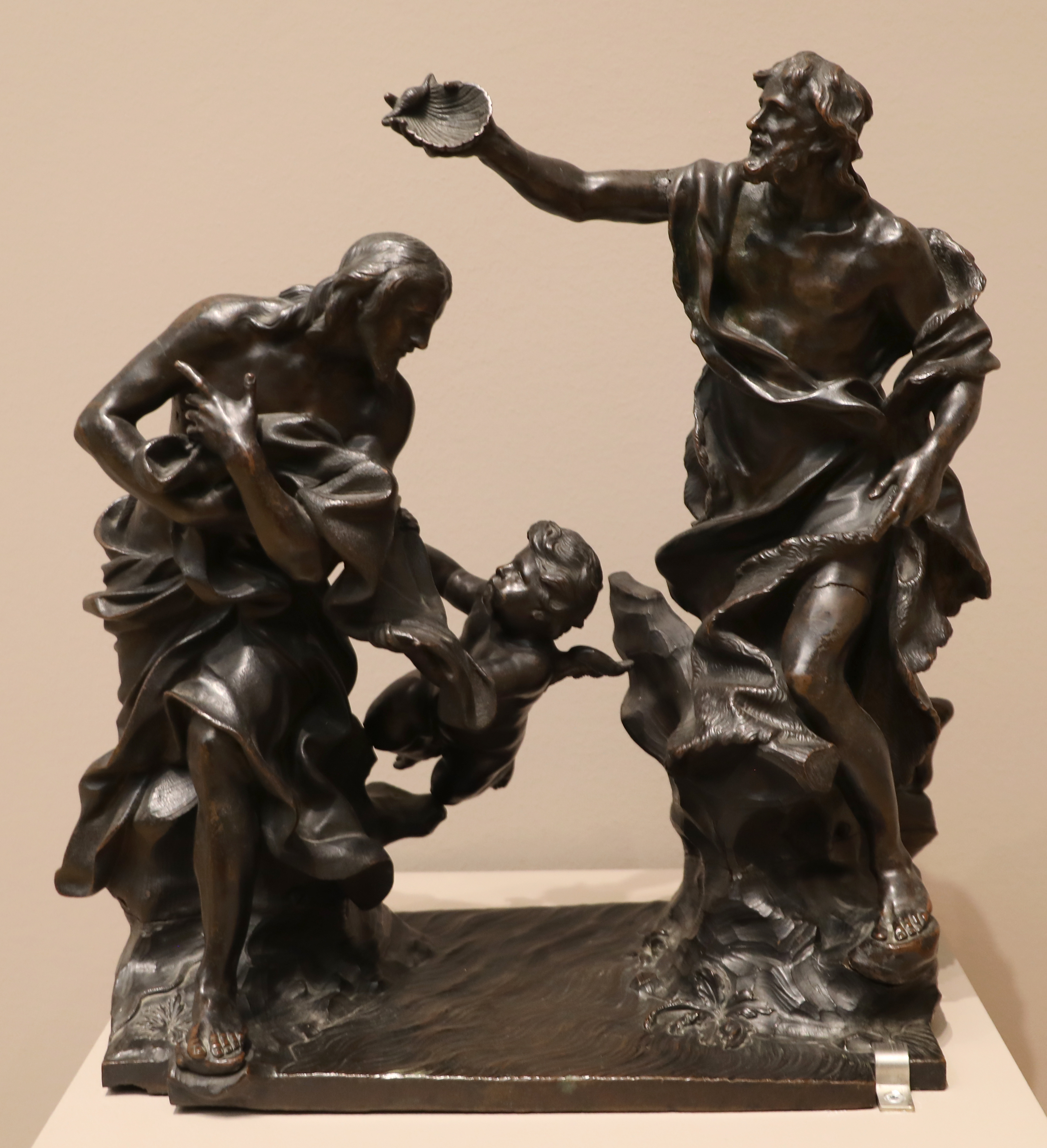
The Baptism of Christ

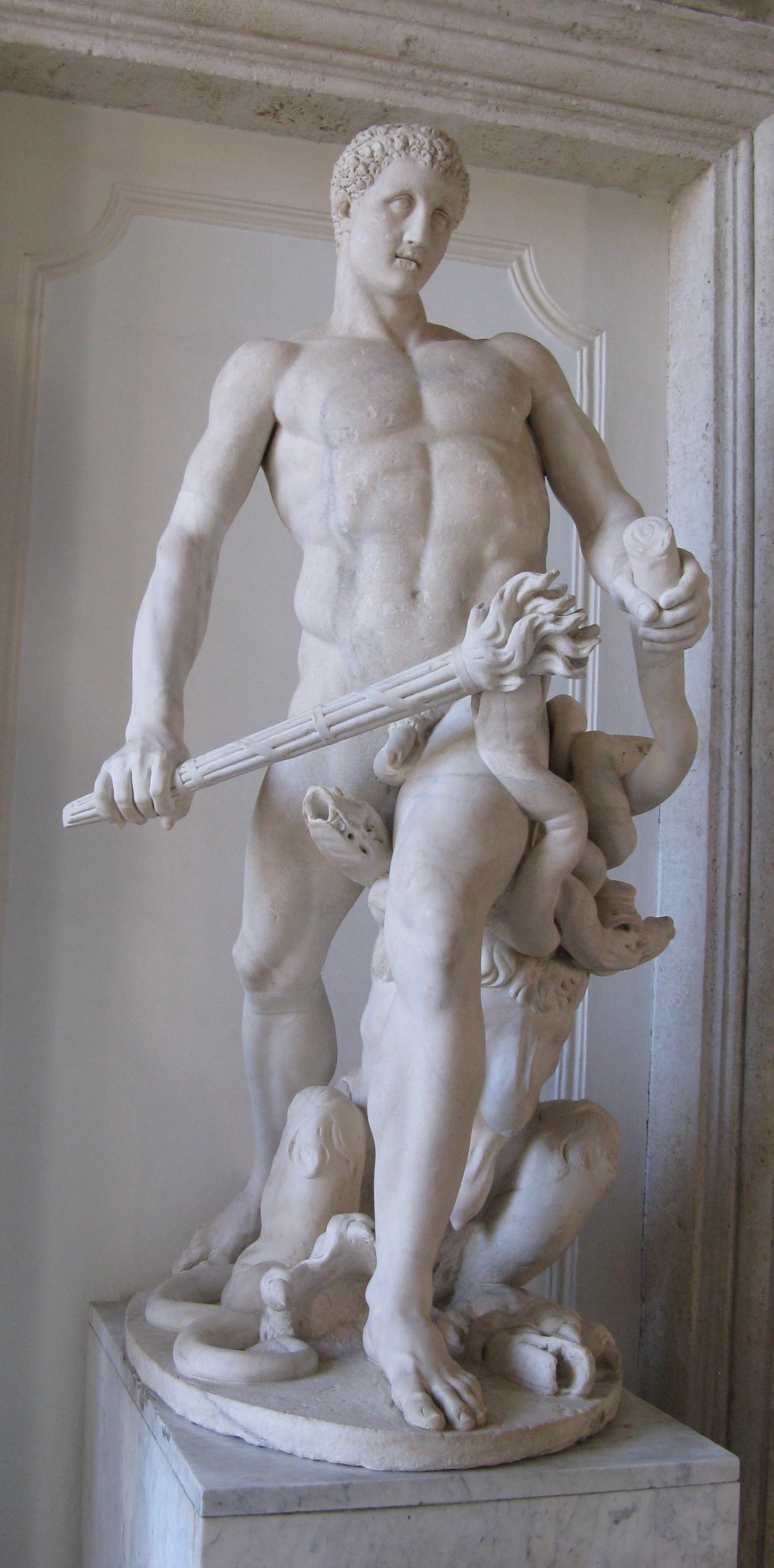
Herakles killing the Lernaean Hydra

== Sources ==
- Montagu, Jennifer (1985). Alessandro Algardi. 2 vols. New Haven and London: Yale University Press. ISBN 0-300-03173-4.
- Boucher, Bruce (1998). Italian Baroque Sculpture. Thames & Hudson, World of Art.
- Alessandro Algardi in the "History of Art"
- Artnet Resource Library: Alessandro Algardi
- Web Gallery of Art: Algardi, sculptures
- Roderick Conway-Morris, "Casting light on a Baroque sculptor", International Herald Tribune, 20 March 1999: Review of exhibition "Algardi: The Other Face of the Baroque", 1999
- "A landscape pen-and-ink drawing by Giovanni Francesco Grimaldi, c. 1650, to which Algardi has added figures of the Holy Family". Getty Museum. Archived from the original on 7 August 2005.
- Images of nearly all works
- Roberto Piperno, "Three busts by Alessandro Algardi" Busts of members of the Frangipane family in S. Marcello al Corso
- Works by Algardi in Europeana
