= Gerolamo Pesci =

Italian painter (1679–1759)

Gerolamo Pesci (1679–1759) was an Italian Baroque painter.

He was born in Rome. He painted an altarpiece depicting Saints Dominic, Francis of Paola and Leonardo worshipping the Holy Trinity for the Cathedral of St Peter the Apostle of Zagarolo. He painted a San Carlo and other Saints for the church of San Filippo in San Severino Marche. He also painted in 1721 a portrait of James Francis Edward Stuart, now at Stanford Hall, Leicestershire.
