= Francesco Aprile =

Italian sculptor

Francesco Aprile (1657 in Carona – 1710 in Turin), was an Italian sculptor and stucco artist, born in what is now Switzerland, and mainly active in Turin, the Duchy of Savoy, but also Rome.

Francesco and his brother Alessandro trained under the sculptor Carlo Alessandro. In 1690, he labored in the Sindone Chapel with Paolo Cortesi, in making the highly ornate marble pavement. Francesco's two sons: Francesco Junior (born 1688) and Giuseppe (born 1694) also became sculptors.

In 1691, he participated in the decoration of the chapel for the Blessed Amadeus IX, Duke of Savoy in the Vercelli Cathedral, based on designs by Michelangelo Garove of Bissone. Alongside Secondo Casella and Francesco Piazzoli he was called to redecorate the rooms of the future Queen Anne Marie d'Orléans. He built furniture of marble for the display of plates inherited by the future Queen. In 1694, he built the balustrade for the main altar of the church of the Santissima Trinità in via Dora Grossa. In Turin in 1709, he signed a contract to build the main altar for the church of the Holy Spirit in Carignano; the altar holds an altarpiece painted by Gerolamo Pesci.
