= Italian Baroque art =

Italian art movement

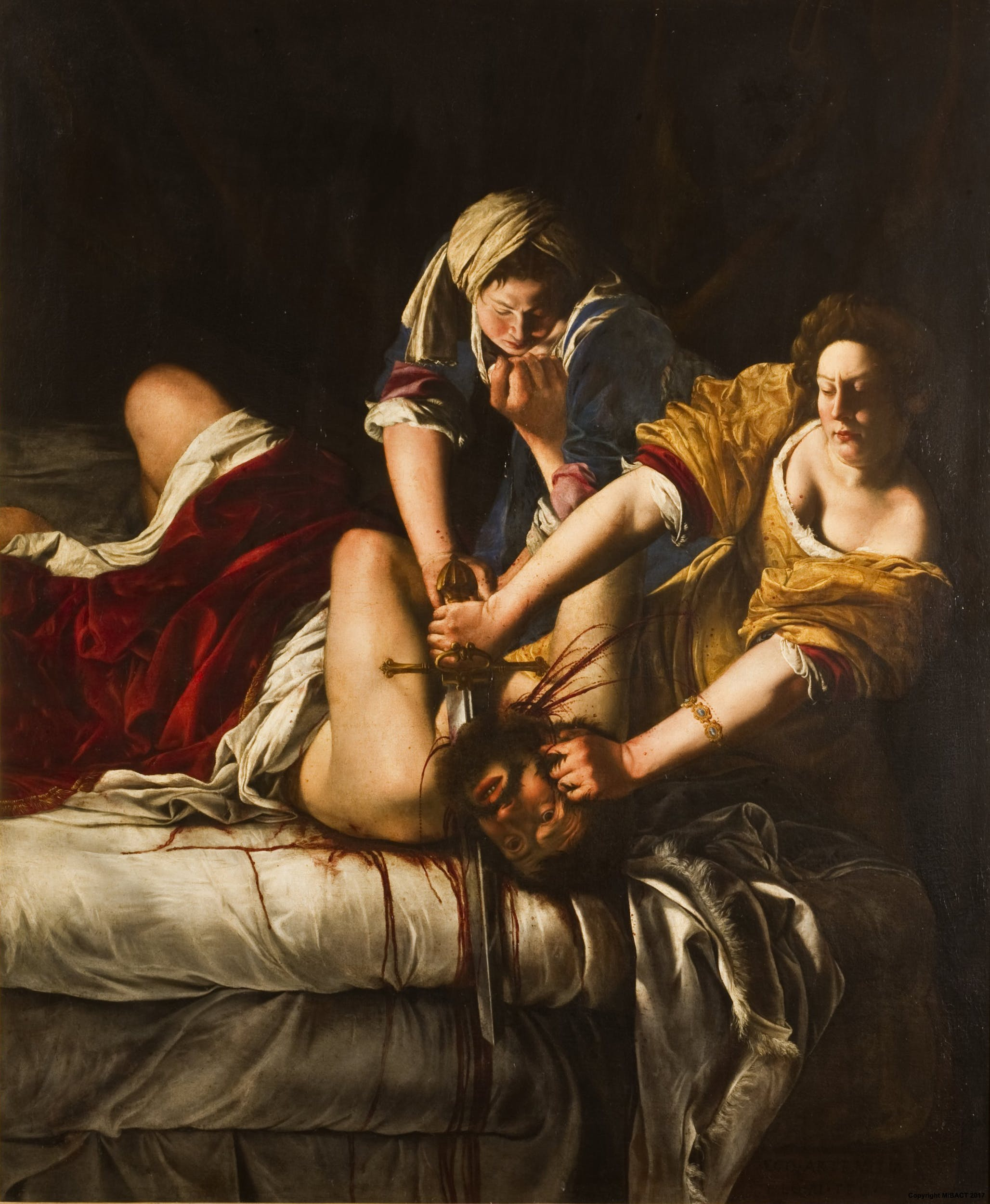
Artemisia Gentileschi, Judith Slaying Holofernes, 1614–20, Oil on canvas 199 x 162 cm, Uffizi, Florence

Italian Baroque art was a very prominent part of the Baroque art in painting, sculpture and other media, made in a period extending from the end of the sixteenth to the mid eighteenth centuries. The movement began in Italy, and despite later currents in the directions of classicism, the Rococo, Italy remained a stronghold throughout the period, with many Italian artists taking Baroque style to other parts of Europe. Italian Baroque architecture is not covered.

== Historical background ==
During the Counter Reformation, the Council of Trent (1545–63), in which the Roman Catholic Church answered many questions of internal reform raised by both Protestants and by those who had remained inside the Catholic Church, addressed the representational arts in a short and somewhat oblique passage in its decrees. This was subsequently interpreted and expounded by clerical authors such as Molanus, the Flemish theologian, who demanded that paintings and sculptures in church contexts should depict their subjects clearly and powerfully, and with decorum, without the stylistic airs of Mannerism.

== The emergence of Italian baroque painting ==
Two of the leading figures in the emergence of Baroque painting in Italy were Michelangelo Merisi da Caravaggio and Annibale Carracci.

Caravaggio (1571–1610), born and trained in Milan, stands as one of the most original and influential contributors to late sixteenth century and early seventeenth century European painting. Controversially, he not only painted figures, even those of classical or religious themes, in contemporary clothing, or as ordinary living men and women, but his inclusion of the seedier side of life (such as dirty feet) was in marked contrast to the usual trend of the time which was to idealise the religious or classical figure by treating it with the decorum considered appropriate to its status. He used tenebrism and stark contrasts between partially lit figures and dark backgrounds to dramatic effect. Some of his famous paintings are 'The Calling of St. Mathew', 'St. Thomas', 'The Conversion of St. Paul', 'The Entombment', and 'The Crowning of the Christ'. His use of light and shadow was emulated by the Caravaggisti, the followers of Caravaggio, such as Orazio Gentileschi (1563–1639), Artemisia Gentileschi (1592-1652/3), Mattia Preti, Carlo Saraceni and Bartolomeo Manfredi.

Annibale Carracci (1560–1609) came from Bologna where, with his brothers Agostino Carracci (1557–1602) and Ludovico Carracci (1555–1619), he set up an influential studio or academy to train painters. Amongst their various joint commissions, the Carracci carried out the fresco decorations in the Palazzo Fava. There followed a succession of important altarpieces in which the critical lessons of such artists as Correggio, Titian, and Veronese are progressively developed and integrated by Annibale within a unifying concept of naturalistic illusionism, based, in particular, upon an unmannered design that is given optical verisimilitude through the manipulation of pure, saturated colors and the atmospheric effects of light and shadow. Two of his famous paintings are ‘The Assumption of the Virgin Mary’ and ‘A Holy Woman at the Tomb of Christ’. In the 1590s he went to Rome to decorate the gallery in the Palazzo Farnese. This ceiling became highly influential on the development of painting during the seventeenth century. Its exuberance and colour was picked up on by later Baroque painters while the classicising aspects of its design (disegno) influenced painters who followed the more classical cannon.

Other influential painters during this early period who influenced the development of Baroque painting included Peter Paul Rubens, Giovanni Lanfranco, Artemesia Gentileschi and Guercino, whilst artists such as Guido Reni and Domenico Zampieri known as Domenichino, pursued a more classical approach.

== Italian High Baroque painting ==
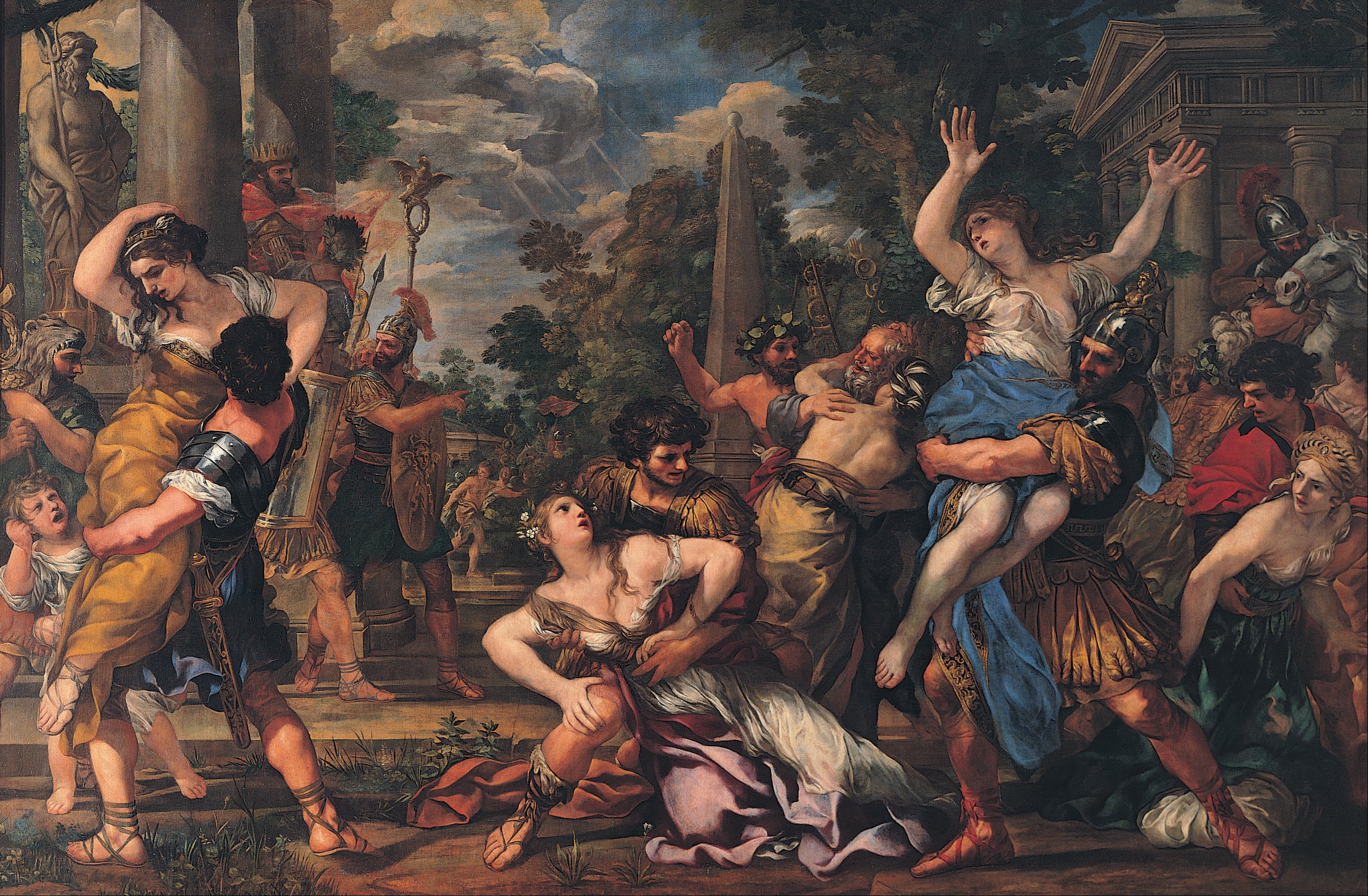
Pietro da Cortona, Rape of the Sabines, 1630-31

The principal painter of the Roman High Baroque, a period that spanned several papal reigns from 1623 to 1667, was Pietro da Cortona. His baroque manner is clearly evident in paintings that he executed for the Sacchetti family in the 1620s and the vault fresco in the Palazzo Barberini (finished 1639) in Rome. During the 1630s, Cortona had a debate at the Accademia di San Luca, the painting academy in Rome, with Andrea Sacchi, a painter with classicising trends, about the perceived differences between their painting styles. The argument essentially concerned the number of figures in a painting and was couched in literary terms, with Cortona arguing for an ‘epic’ approach with an abundance of figures and Sacchi making the case for ‘tragedy’ with fewer figures to convey the messages in a painting.

Baroque painters such as Cortona, Giovan Battista Gaulli and Ciro Ferri continued to flourish alongside the classical trend represented by painters such as Sacchi and Nicolas Poussin, but even a classicising painter like Sacchi's pupil Carlo Maratta was influenced in his use of colour by the Baroque. In the 1672, Gian Pietro Bellori's ‘Lives of the Artists’ was published. This promoted classical idealism in art so artists of this trend were included (so was Caravaggio) but some of the leading artists of the seventeenth century were omitted such as Cortona, the sculptor Gianlorenzo Bernini and the architect Francesco Borromini.

== Later Italian Baroque painting ==
Monumental ceiling frescoes mainly date to the latter part of the seventeenth century. Some were dramatically illusionistic such as Gaulli's nave fresco (1674-9) in the church of the Gesu and Andrea Pozzo's nave vault (1691-4) in Sant'Ignazio, both in Rome.

Luca Giordano 1634-1705 was born in Naples and was so prodigious in his output of paintings that he was known as ‘Luca fa presto’ (Luke fast work)

Important Venetian painters included Sebastiano Ricci (1659–1734) and Giovanni Battista Piazzetta (1683–1754) but the greatest baroque exponent was Gianbattista Tiepolo (1696–1770). He is renowned for his light palette of colours used with fluid brush strokes, and it is his frescoes rather than his canvases that exhibit these techniques most effectively. His works include frescoes at the Palazzo Labia and the Scuola Grande dei Carmini in Venice, Villa Valmarana at Vicenza, Villa Pisani at Stra, works at the Würzburg Residence and the throne room at the Royal Palace of Madrid.

An important centre of Italian Baroque painting was Genoa. Many, even from abroad, came to the city to gain Baroque artistic experience, and later went to Venice, Florence, Rome or other important Baroque centres. Prolonged visits to the town were made by artists from other parts of Italy and other countries, including Velázquez, Van Dyck, the French sculptor Pierre Puget, Bernardo Strozzi and Giovanni Benedetto Castiglione.

Another Italian city which had a vibrant Baroque movement was Milan. The city hosted numerous formidable artists, architects and painters of that period, such as Caravaggio.

== Baroque sculpture ==
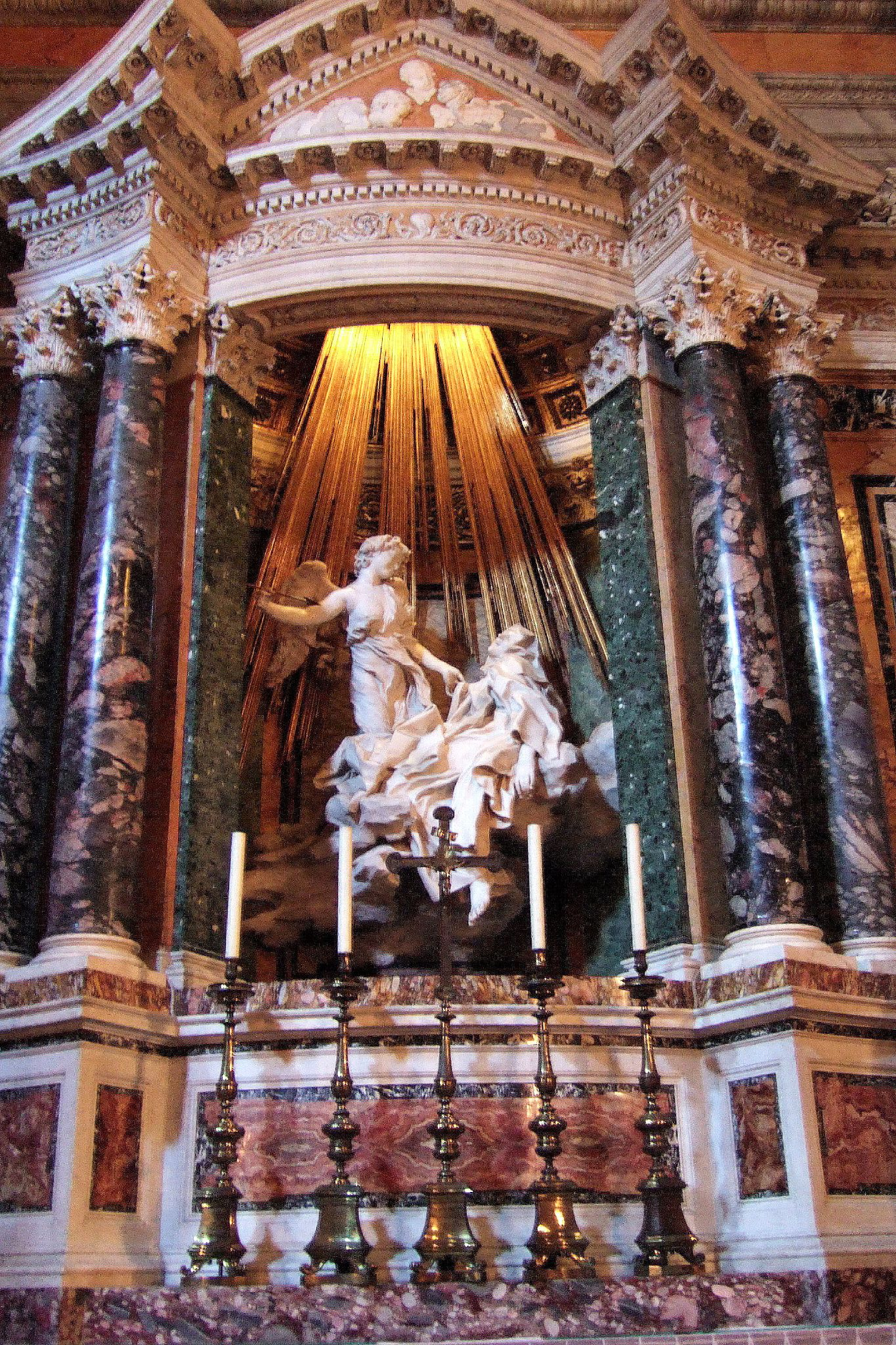
Bernini's Ecstasy of St. Teresa.

Gian Lorenzo Bernini (1598–1680) was the leading sculptor of his day and the favorite artist of several popes and their relatives, who gave him important commissions. His ‘Apollo and Daphne’ in the Villa Borghese in Rome illustrates how he could precisely capture in white marble the dramatic moment when Daphne, fleeing the pursuing sun god, realizes she is metamorphosing into a laurel tree. This ability to make expressive dramatic narratives in sculpture can also be seen in his Ecstasy of Saint Teresa (1645–52), created for the Cornaro Chapel in Santa Maria della Vittoria, the Blessed Ludovica Albertoni in San Francesco a Ripa in Rome, and St Longinus in St Peter's. He was also a fine sculptor of portrait busts. He had a workshop which trained sculptors such as Antonio Raggi and Ercole Ferrata. His main rival in sculpture was Alessandro Algardi.

Melchiorre Caffà (1635–1667) was the pupil of Ferrata and executed ‘The ecstasy of Saint Catherine’ in S Catherina da Siena a Monte Magnapoli in Rome, before his early death.

Filippo Parodi (1630–1702) was an important sculptor from Genoa. Francesco Queirolo executed several sculptures for the Cappella Sansevero in Naples including the technically demanding ‘Deception unmasked’ (after 1750). Giacomo Serpotta was the outstanding Sicilian Baroque sculptor and known particularly for his stucco figures and decorations in several oratories in Palermo.

== Gallery of Italian Baroque art and sculpture ==
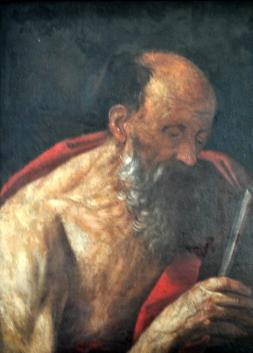
16th century un-signed painting of St. Jerome, in private collection

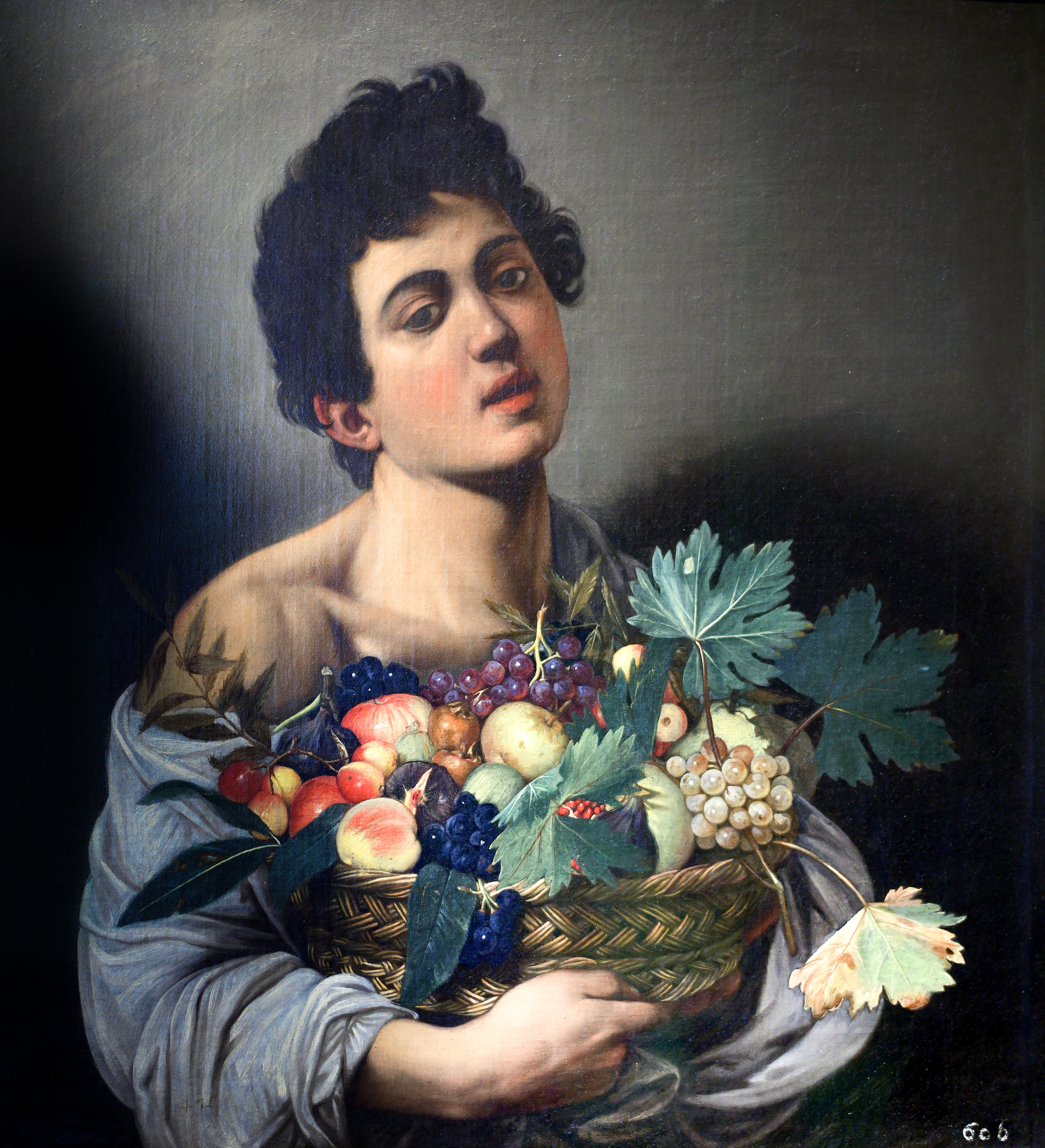
Caravaggio, Boy with a Basket of Fruit, 1593-1594.

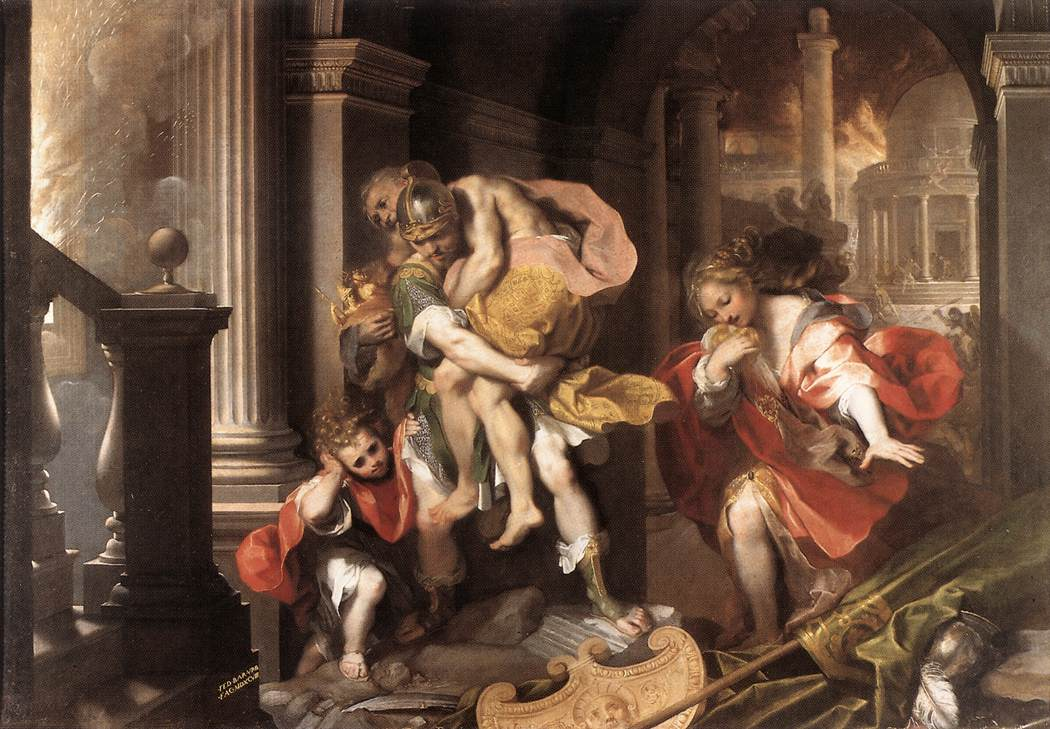
Federico Barocci, Aeneas flees burning Troy, 1598.

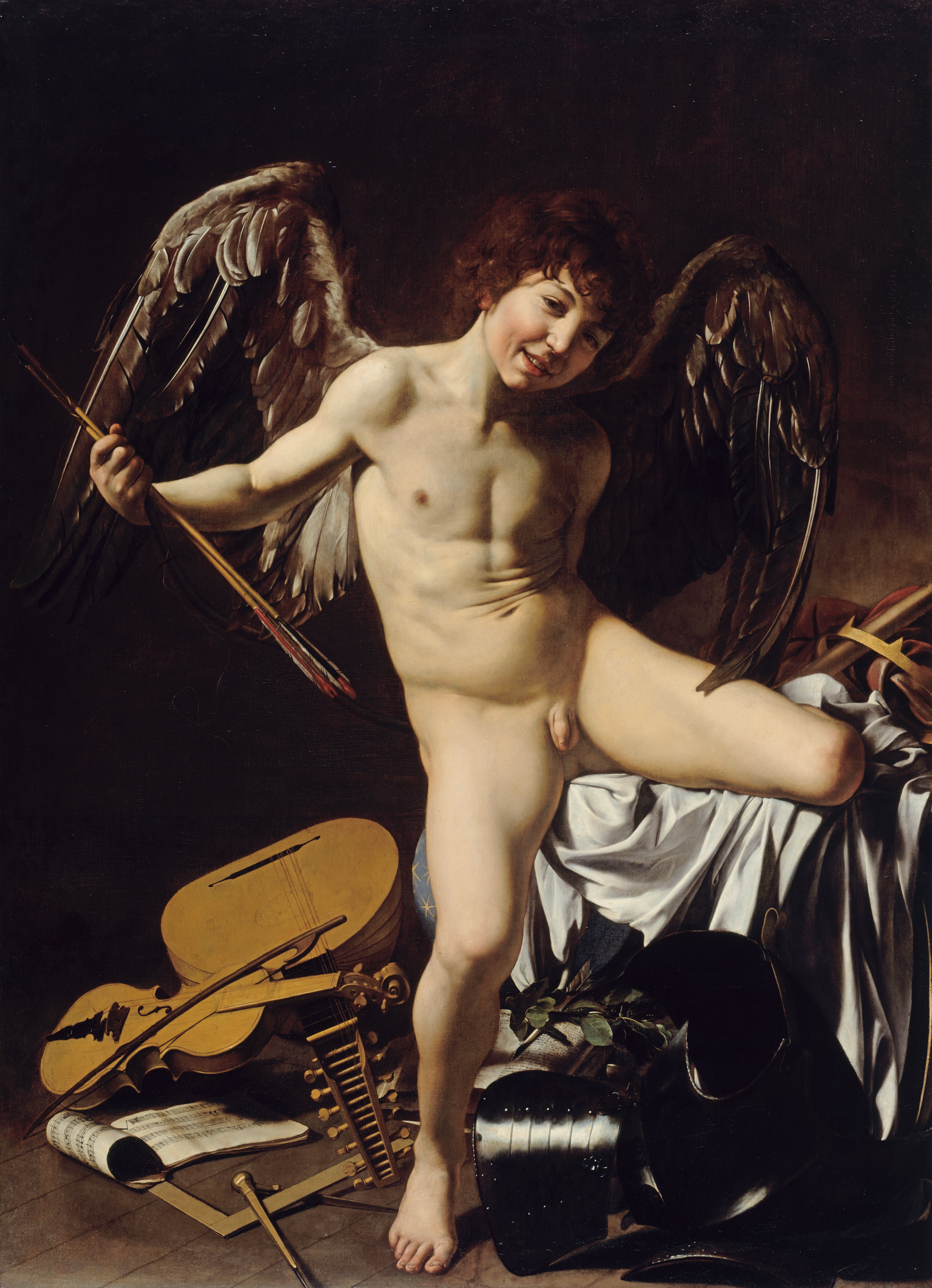
Caravaggio, Amor Vincit Omnia, 1601–1602.

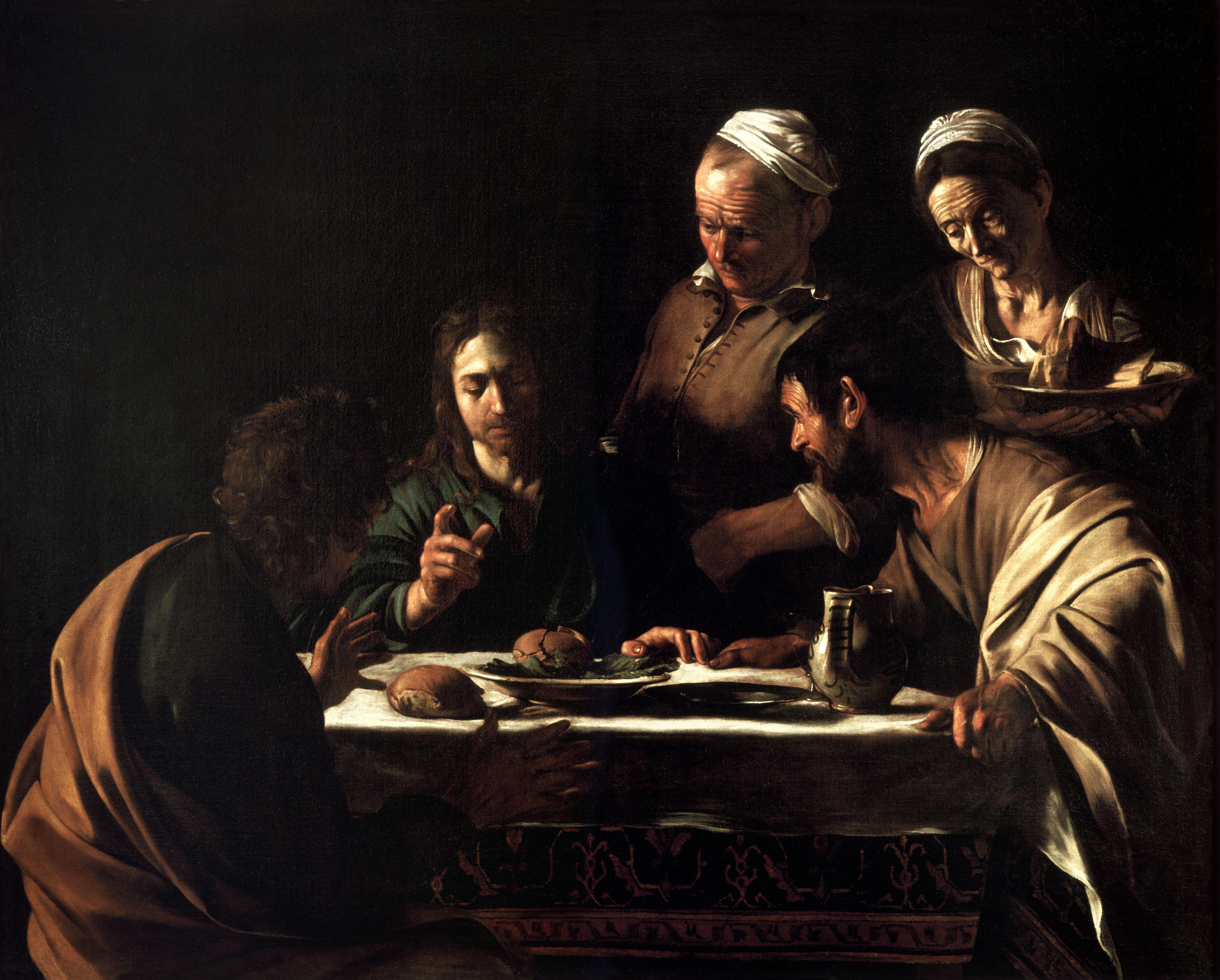
Caravaggio, Supper at Emmaus, 1606.

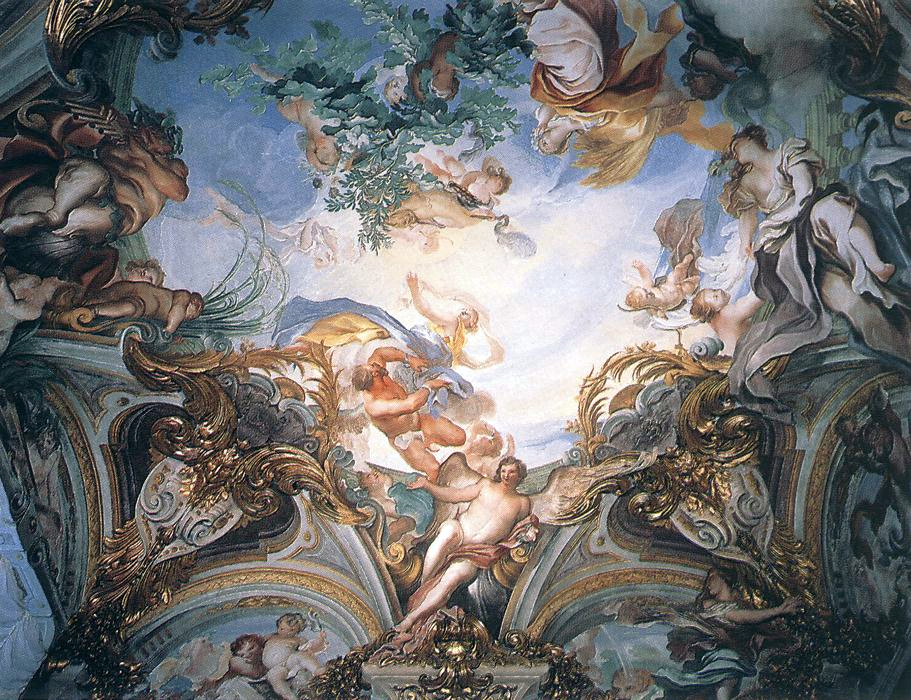
Gregorio de’ Ferrari, Allegoria dell'Estate, 1686–7, Palazzo Rosso, Genoa.

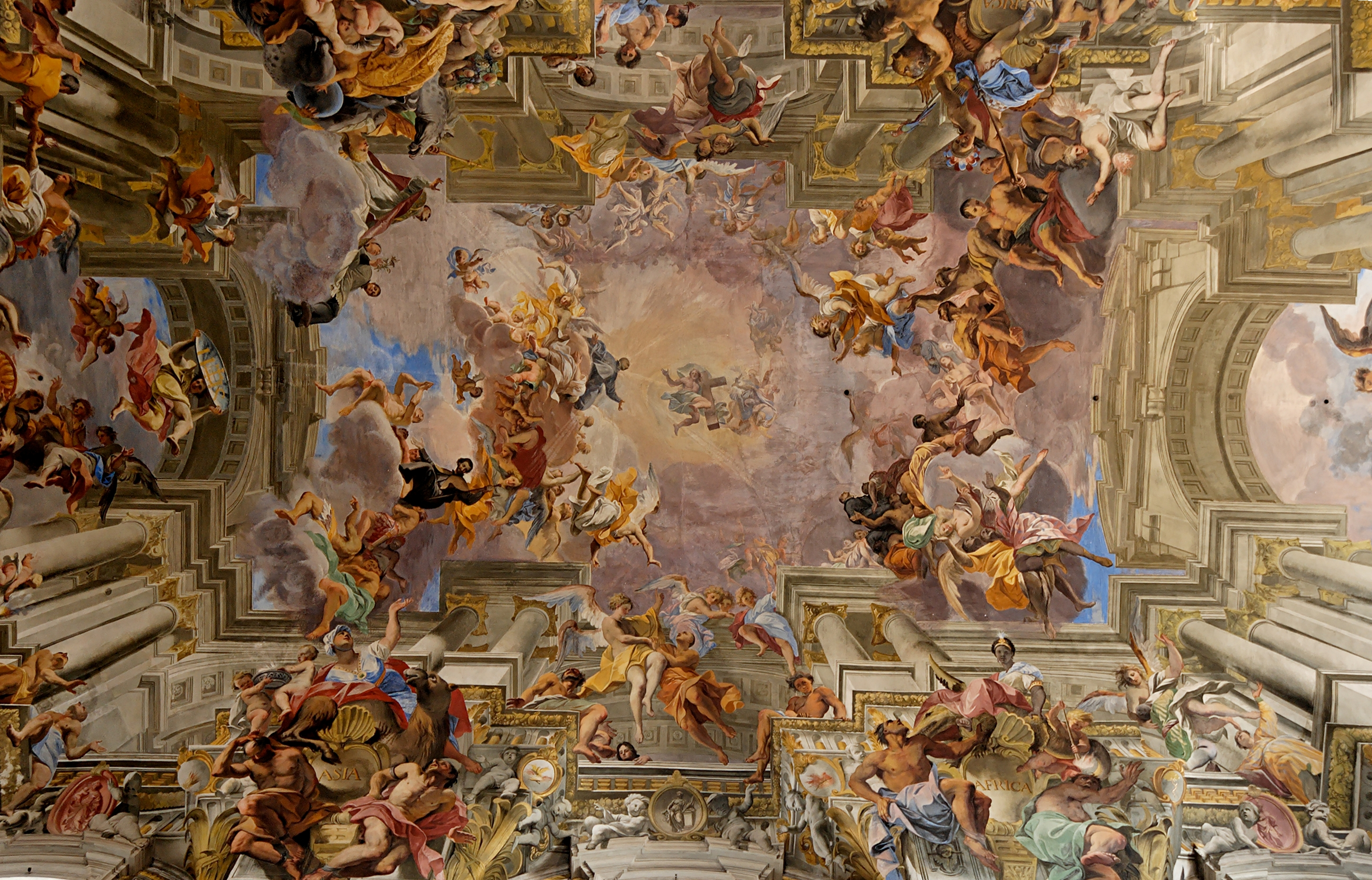
Andrea Pozzo, Glory of St. Ignatius, 1691–94. Ceiling of Sant'Ignazio, Rome.

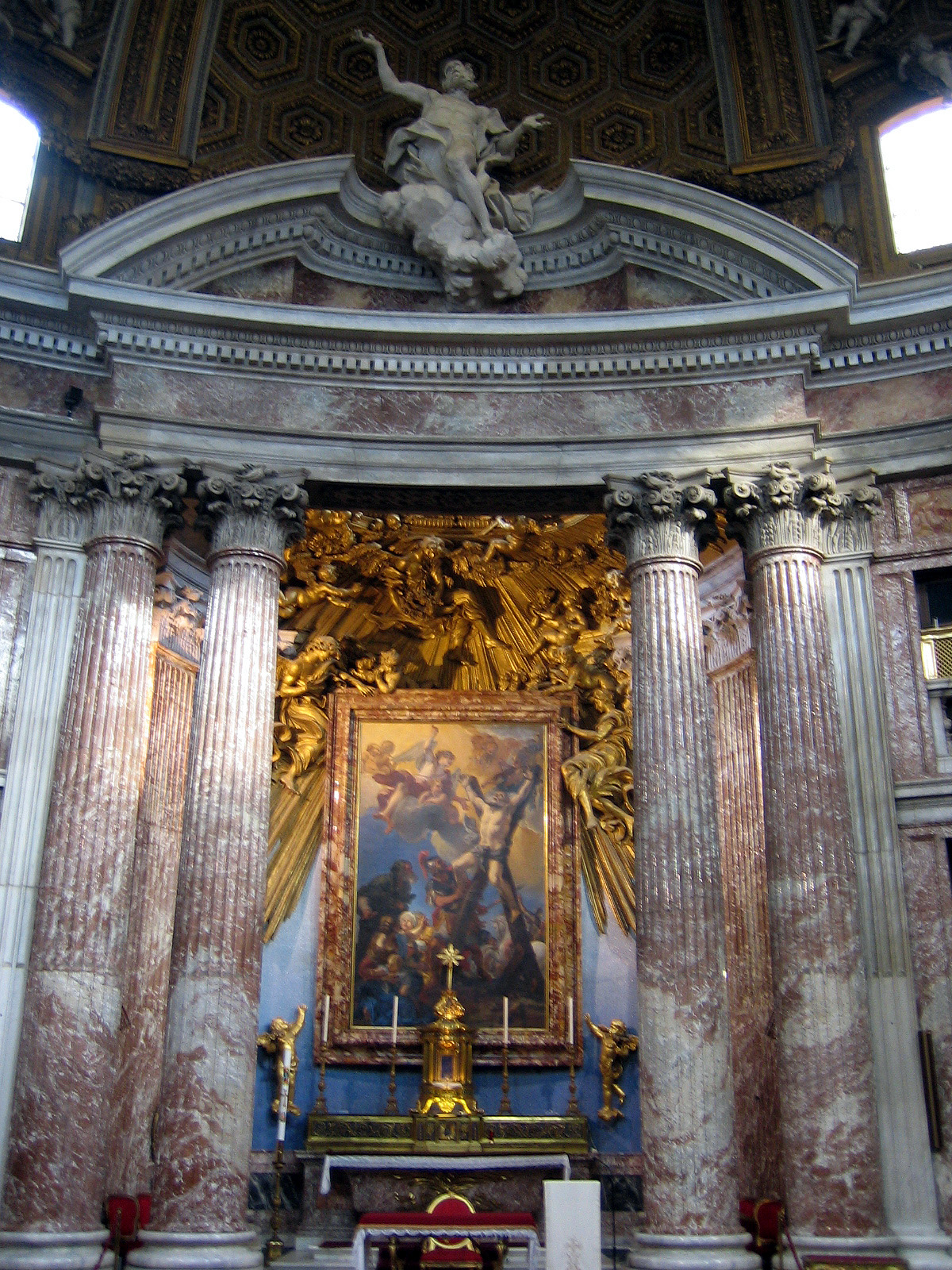
The high altar of the Church of Sant'Andrea al Quirinale, with a sculpture of Saint Andrew by Antonio Raggi to a design by Bernini, c. 1668.

== See also ==
- Italian Baroque
- Italian Baroque interior design
- Italian Baroque architecture
