= Domenico Maria Muratori =

Italian painter (1662–1744)

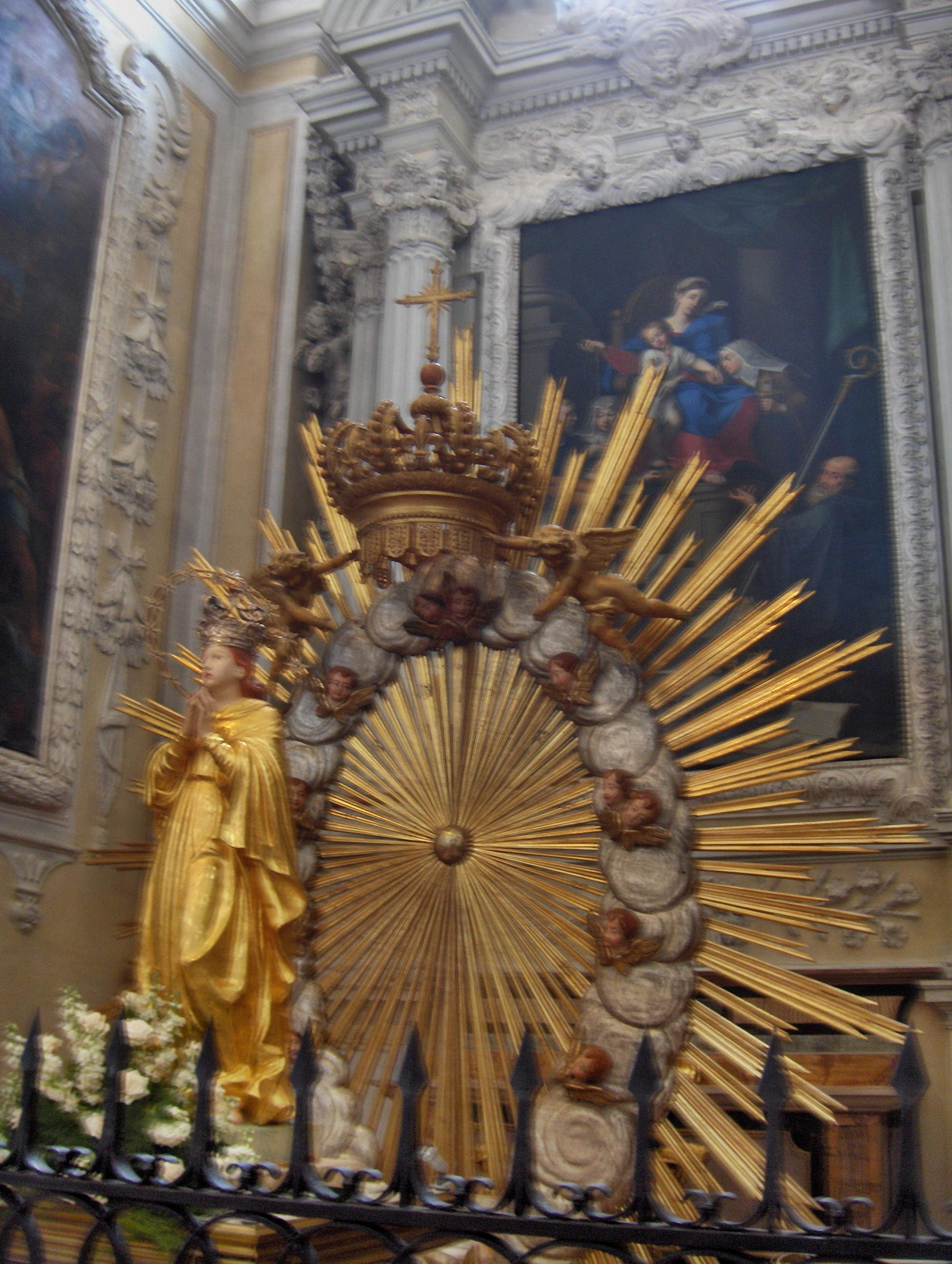
Domenico Maria Muratori, Our Lady of the Rosary and Saints, Basilica of Santa Maria degli Angeli (painting above the altar)

Domenico Maria Muratori (1662–1744) was an Italian painter of the late seventeenth and early eighteenth century, specializing in altarpieces.

Muratori was born in Vendrana in the Budrio commune. He was a Bolognese painter who studied under Lorenzo Pasinelli. They met in the studio of Giovanni Gioseffo dal Sole, where she was also a student. Muratori specialized in religious-themed works. He produced frescoes for the second chapel of San Francesco a Ripa. He died in Rome in 1744.
