= Antonino da Patti =

- Died: 1617; Rome, Papal States
- Occupation: priest

Antonino da Patti was a Sicilian priest. In 1596 he was made an apostolic visitor for the Order of Reformed Friars Minor in the Terra di Lavoro. In that role, he corresponded directly with Cardinal Berlinghiero Gessi in 1606.

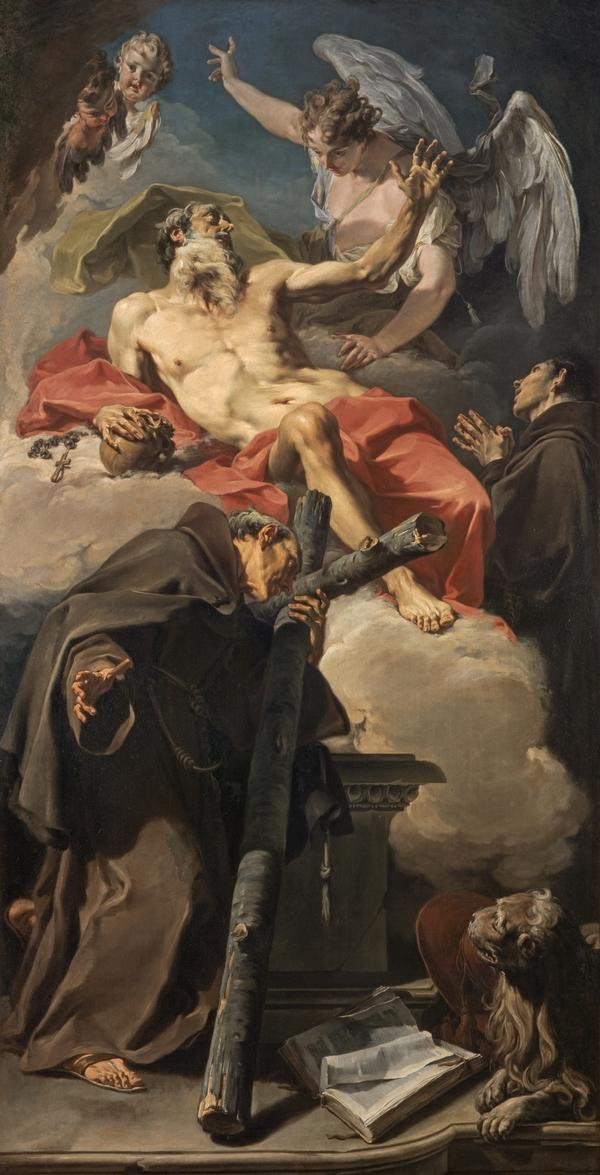
The Apotheosis of Saint Jerome with Saint Peter of Alcántara and Antonino da Patti, by Giambattista Pittoni (1687–1767)

He suffered many persecutions, and died in Rome in 1617. He was buried at the church of San Francesco a Ripa.

== Publications ==
- Considerationi et espositioni sopra tutti li precetti della regola de' frati, Venice: Giovanni Guerigli, 1615.
