= Blessed Ludovica Albertoni =

Artwork by Gianlorenzo Bernini

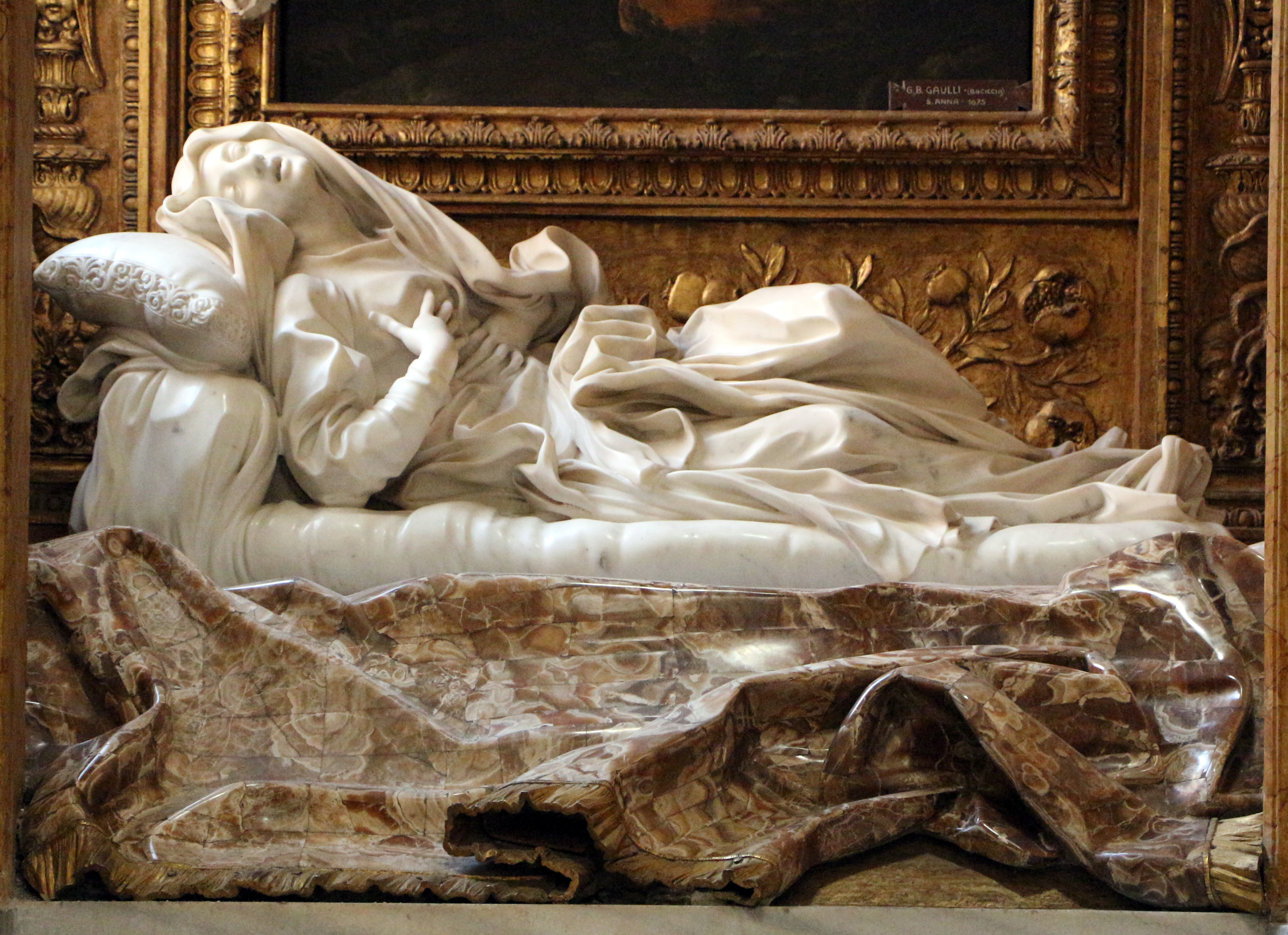
- Click on the map to see marker.
- Artist: Gian Lorenzo Bernini
- Year: 1671–1674
- Catalogue: 76
- Type: Sculpture
- Medium: Marble
- Subject: Ludovica Albertoni
- Dimensions: Over life-size
- Location: Church of San Francesco a Ripa; Rome; 41°53′05″N 12°28′22″E
- Preceded by: Bust of Gabriele Fonseca
- Followed by: Tomb of Pope Alexander VII

Blessed Ludovica Albertoni (Italian: Beata Ludovica Albertoni) is a funerary monument by the Italian Baroque artist Gian Lorenzo Bernini. The Trastevere sculpture is located in the specially designed Altieri Chapel in the Church of San Francesco a Ripa in Rome, Italy. Bernini started the project in 1671, but his work on two other major works—The Tomb of Pope Alexander VII and the Altar of the Blessed Sacrament in St. Peter's Basilica—delayed his work on the funerary monument. Bernini completed the sculpture in 1674; it was installed by 31 August 1674.

== Background ==
The subject of the sculpture, Ludovica Albertoni, was a Roman noblewoman who entered the Third Order of St. Francis following the death of her husband. She lived a pious life, working for the poor of the Trastevere neighborhood, under the guidance of the Franciscan friars of San Francesco Church, where she was buried in 1533. One of her descendants, Cardinal Paluzzo Paluzzi degli Albertoni, had a nephew who married the niece of Pope Clement X, who in turn formally adopted the cardinal as his own nephew and allowed him to take the pontiff's own surname, "Altieri". Pope Clement beatified Cardinal Albertoni's ancestor, granting her the title of "Blessed". The cardinal then commissioned major improvements to her chapel in the Church of San Francesco, which had become the site of her cult. After several artists competed to do the work, Bernini was awarded the commission, and took on the project without pay. He was 71 years old when he began the work, and it was one of his last sculptures.

Some scholars have questioned the 1671 start date, pointing to a document showing that Bernini purchased the white marble for the statue on 7 February 1674. This would have placed the start in late 1673, meaning the artist executed the work in six months. The sculpture was installed by 31 August 1674.

== Description ==
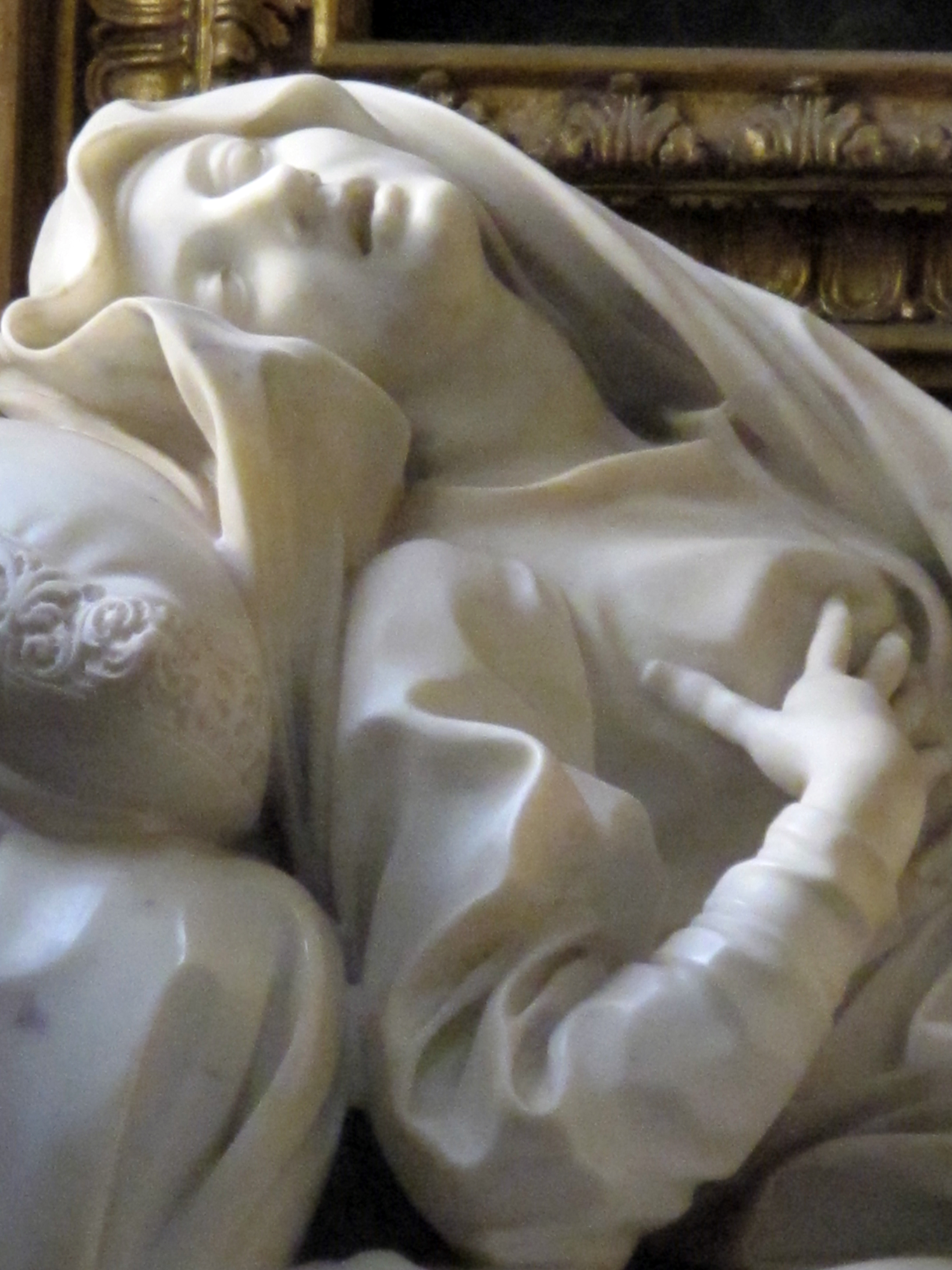
Blessed Ludovica Albertoni detail

The figure of Ludovica Albertoni is set above the altar of the Altieri Chapel on the left side of the church of San Francesco a Ripa. Bernini designed an architectural setting that focuses attention on the marble sculpture, framing it within an archway he cut into an existing wall where a painting had previously hung. The main figure is flanked by deep returns set at oblique angles decorated with earlier frescoes of Saint Clare of Assisi and Blessed Ludovica herself providing alms to a beggar. The central figure is lit on both sides by large windows concealed by the returns.

The figure of Ludovica Albertoni is presented on a mattress at the moment of mystical communion with God. The folds of her habit reflect her state of turmoil, and her head is thrown back onto an embroidered pillow supported by a headrest. Beneath her figure is a deeply crumpled sculpted cloth above a red-marble sarcophagus, where Ludovica is interred. The panel behind her is carved with stylized pomegranates; flaming hearts adorn the base of the windows. She is surrounded by putti, ready to guide her spirit to heaven.

The painting above the sculpture is by Bernini's protégé Baciccio.

== Similar works ==
- Bernini's Ecstasy of Saint Teresa (1647–52) in the Cornaro Chapel
- Antonio Giorgetti's Saint Sebastian (c. 1672) in San Sebastiano fuori le mura
- Ercole Ferrata's statue of the dying Saint Anastasia in the Basilica di Sant'Anastasia al Palatino
- Giovanni Battista Maini's sculpture of Saint Anne in Sant'Andrea delle Fratte

== See also ==
- List of works by Gian Lorenzo Bernini
