= Charity of St Thomas of Villanova =

17th-century etching by Melchiorre Cafà

Coordinates: 35.8983°N 14.5092°E

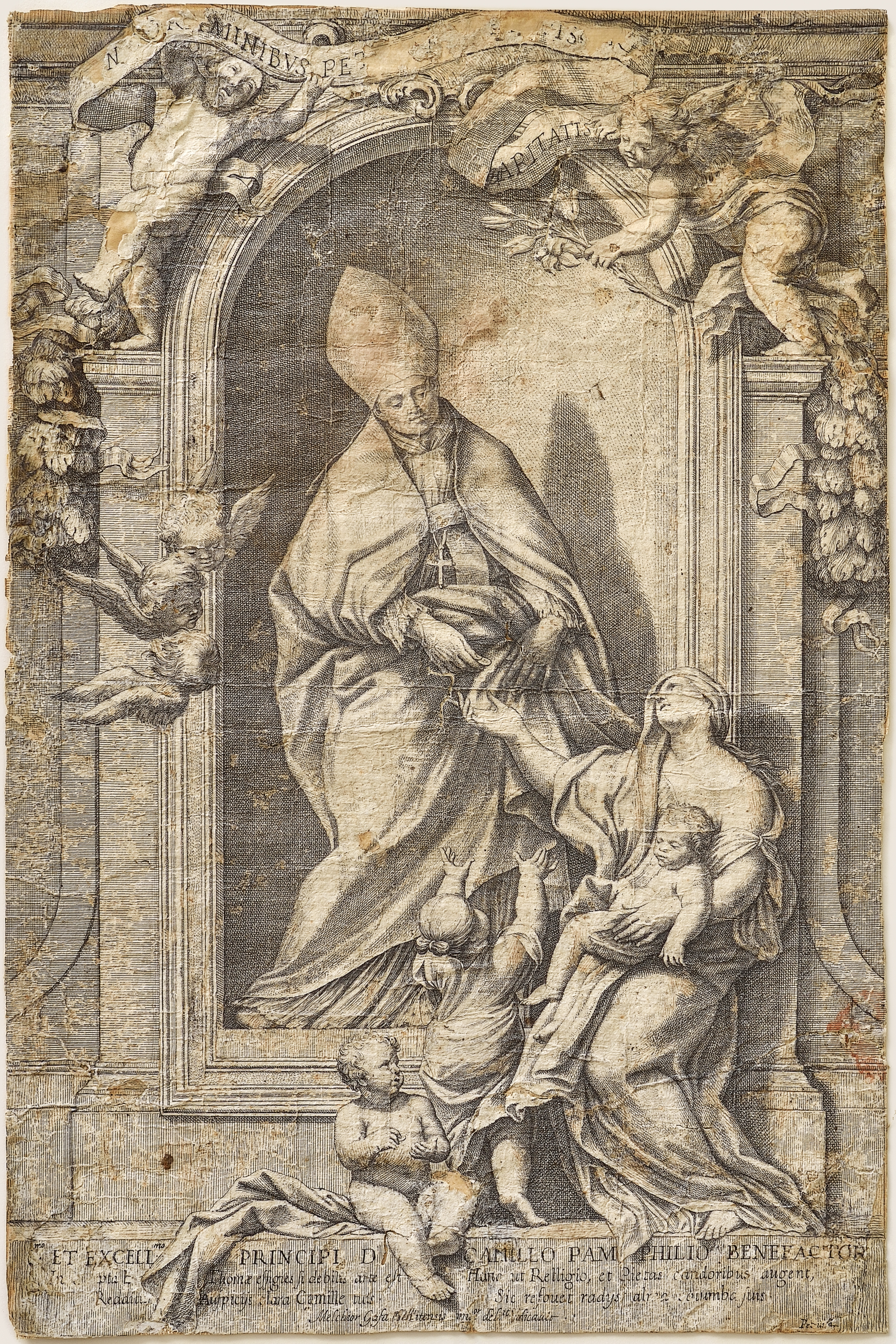
- Artist: Melchiorre Cafà
- Year: 1660s
- Medium: etching on paper
- Dimensions: 60 cm × 40 cm (24 in × 16 in)
- Location: MUŻA, Valletta, Malta

Charity of St Thomas of Villanova is an etching by Melchiorre Cafà from the 1660s.

== Description ==
The print's dimensions are 60 x 40 centimeters. It is in the collection of MUŻA in Valletta, Malta.

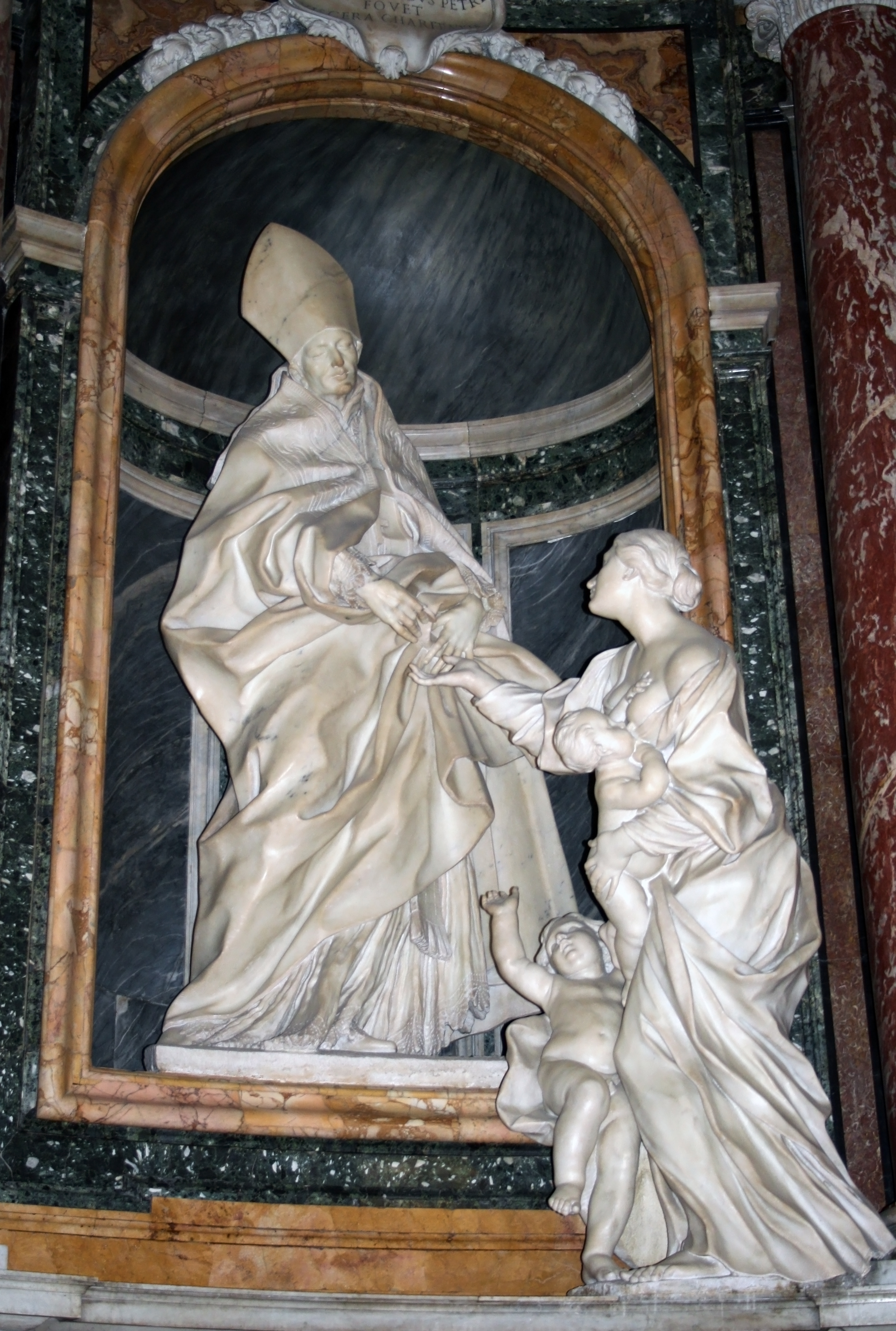
San Tommaso da Villanova

== Analysis ==
It is an illustration of the sculpture in the church of Sant'Agostino in Rome.
