= Melchiorre Cafà =

Maltese sculptor (1636–1667)

- Melchiorre Gafà
- Self-portrait, Nationalmuseum, Stockholm
- Born: 1636; Birgu, Hospitaller Malta
- Died: 4 September 1667 (aged 31); Rome, Papal States
- Cause of death: Work accident
- Resting place: San Biagio della Pagnotta, Rome
- Occupation: Sculptor
- Style: Baroque
- Parents: Marco Gafà (father); Veronica Gafà (mother)
- Relatives: Lorenzo Gafà (brother)

Melchiorre Cafà (born Melchiorre Gafà; (Note: After a long period of various spellings—including Caffà, Gafa, Gaffar, and Gafar—international scholars of Italian baroque sculpture finally agreed on the spelling Cafà, which he himself used when signing works; cf. the book by Sciberras cited below.) 1636–1667) was a Maltese Baroque sculptor. Cafà began a promising career in Rome but this was cut short by his premature death following a work accident. He was the older brother of the architect Lorenzo Gafà.

== Biography ==
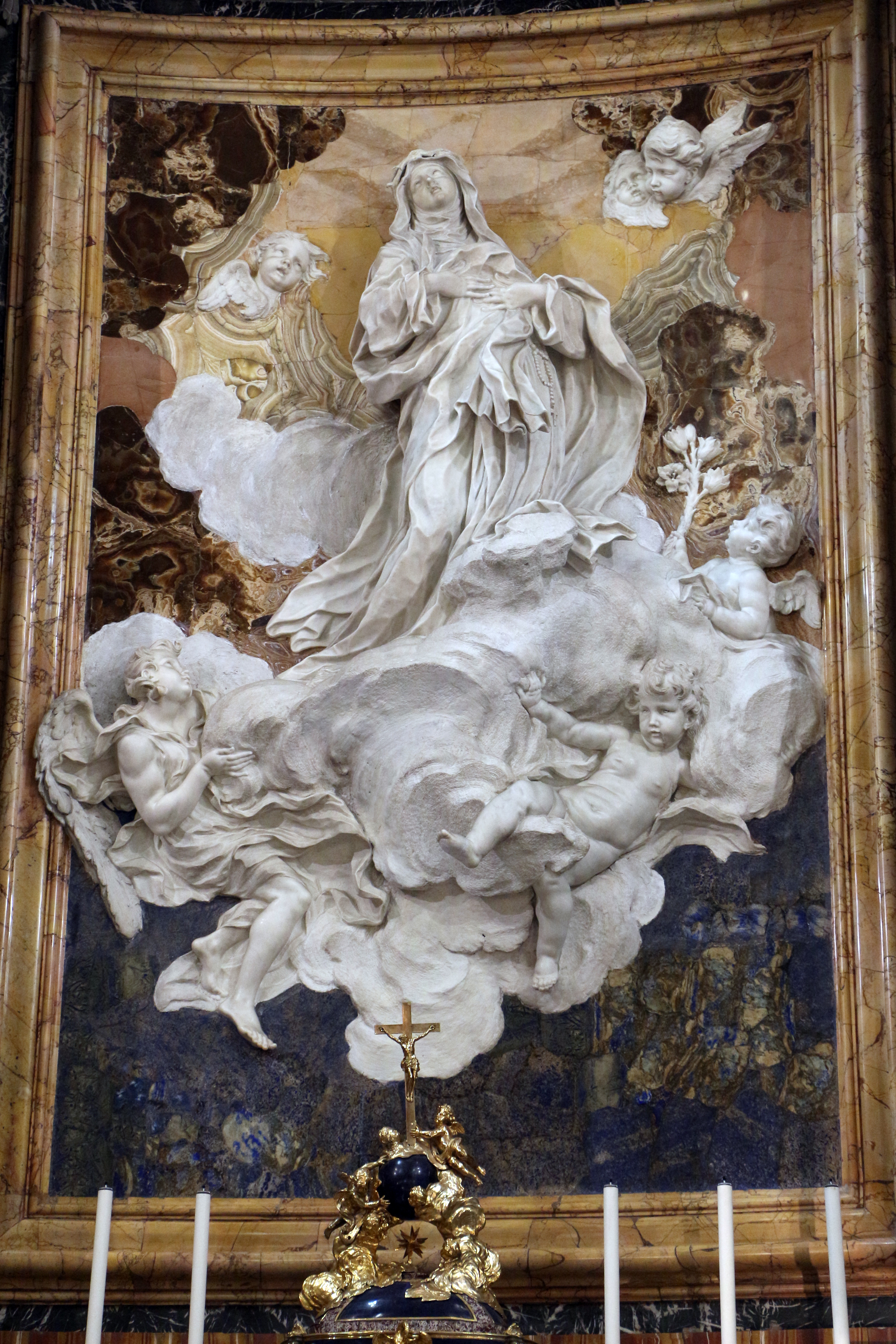
Ecstasy of Saint Catherine

Cafà was born in Vittoriosa, Malta, and given the name Marcello at his baptism on 21 January 1636. After his move to Rome in 1658 or shortly after, he was most frequently referred to as Melchior (or Melchiorre) Maltese. His brother Lorenzo Gafà was one of the leading architects in Malta.

Cafà was already an accomplished sculptor when he came to Rome and entered the workshop of Ercole Ferrata, who was not strictly speaking his teacher although he probably helped him refining his technique. Despite soon attracting his own commissions, he stayed in close contact with Ferrata and collaborated with him.

In 1660 Cafà signed his first independent contract with Prince Camillo Pamphilj for the relief of the Martyrdom of Saint Eustace in Sant'Agnese in Agone. In 1662 he became a member of the Accademia di San Luca and was even elected its principal in 1667, but declined the honor. Reportedly, he was a close friend of the painter Giovanni Battista Gaulli. Cafà died on the 4 September 1667 after some material collapsed on him in the foundry of Saint Peter's while he was working on the altar decoration for St John's Co-Cathedral in Valletta. (Note: This was eventually executed decades later and after a new design by Cafà's most distinguished (and according to contemporary sources his only) pupil Giuseppe Mazzuoli.)

There is no monument or plaque in his honour in his home city of Vittoriosa, Malta. However, the Maltese Post Office issued several stamps with Cafà's sculptures as motives.

== Works ==
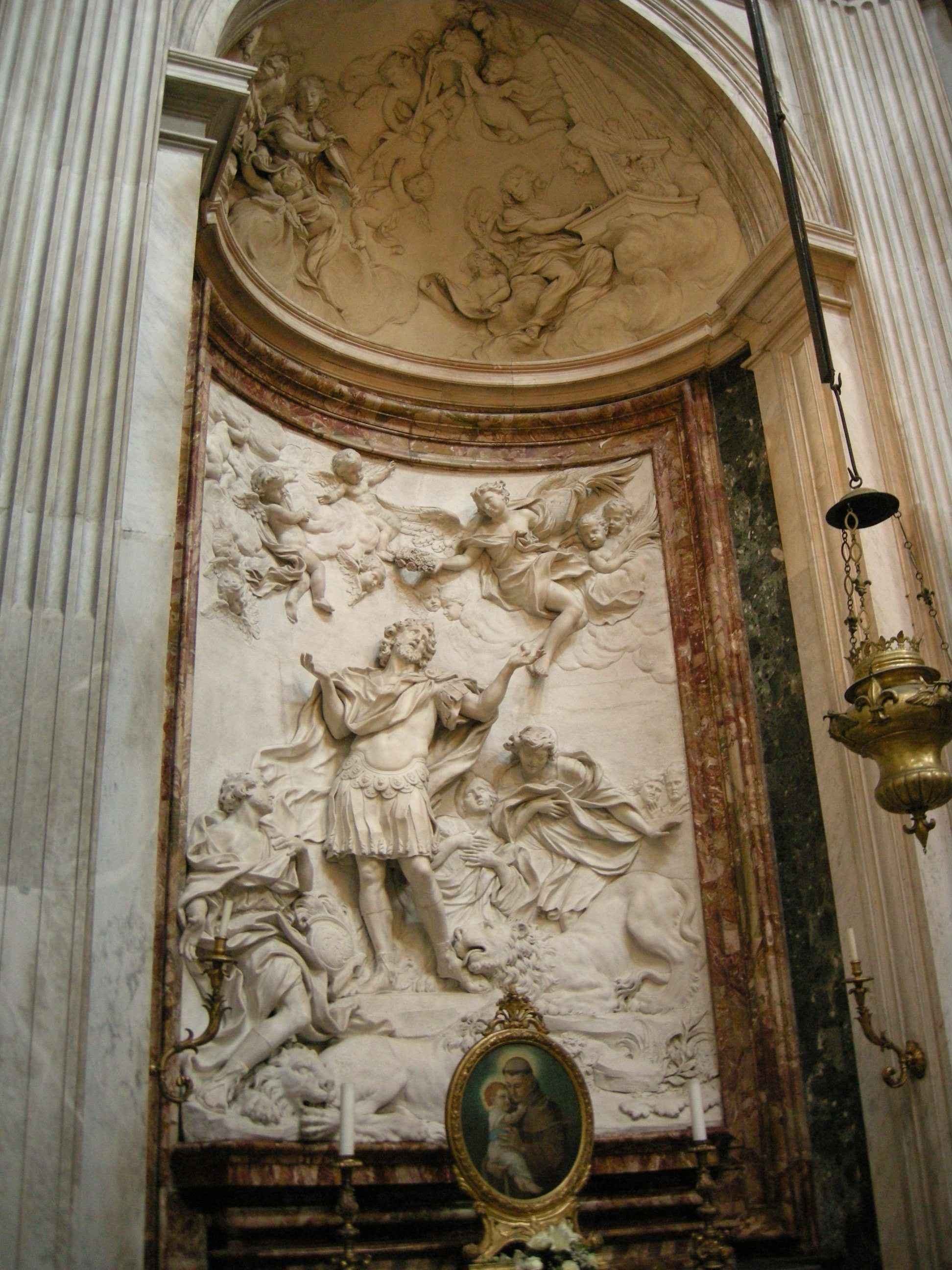
Martyrdom of Saint Eustace

Extremely busy throughout his short life, he only managed to finish a few major commissions himself:

- Wooden statue of Saint Paul in St. Paul's Shipwreck in Valletta (c. 1659).
- Wooden statue of the Virgin of the Rosary in the Dominican Church, Rabat, Malta (1660–61).
- The marble statue of the dying Saint Rose of Lima (signed and dated 1665; Lima, Santo Domingo) was in 1668 the centrepiece for the future saint's Beatification ceremony in Rome's Santa Maria sopra Minerva, and shipped to Peru straight after that event. While it has some formal analogies with Bernini's Ecstasy of St Theresa and possibly influenced in its turn the latter's Death of the Blessed Ludovica Albertoni, Cafà's statue depicts a peaceful death, free from the turmoil in the two works by Bernini.
- Saint Thomas of Villanova distributing alms in the church of Sant'Agostino in Rome (1663–69).
- The relief in white marble of the Ecstasy of Saint Catherine of Siena at Santa Caterina a Magnanapoli in Rome. The curved polychrome background is suggestive of cloud formations and of a halo, intensifying the idea that the saint is carried to heaven. There are no known dates for Cafà's intervention, but it is generally accepted that he finished it himself, i.e. 1667 or earlier. The wax bozzetto for this work was discovered by Edgar Vella in 1995 and is now in a private collection in Malta.
- A bust of Alexander VII exists in an extremely fine terracotta version in the Palazzo Chigi in Ariccia, a signed bronze (dated 1667) is in New York's Metropolitan Museum (photo here) and a further bronze in the Duomo in Siena.
- The Glory of the high altar of Santa Maria in Campitelli in Rome.

A number of Cafà terracottas are in the Hermitage Museum in St. Petersburg, MUŻA (previously the National Museum of Fine Arts) in Valletta, the Museo di Palazzo Venezia in Rome, the Fogg Museum at Harvard University, Massachusetts, and the Museo di Roma. There are various wax reliefs and sculptures by Cafà in Malta: the Valletta Museum has sketches of martyrs, and models for the statues in the colonnade in Saint Peter's Square in Rome. Notably, MUŻA houses the etching Charity of St Thomas of Villanova and a bronze statuette of Saint Rose of Lima, which is a smaller copy of the statue of the dying Saint Rose of Lima that Cafà himself had created in marble. Four reliefs were recently discovered in the Cathedral of Mdina representing the Nativity, the Adoration of the shepherds, the Annunciation and the Glory of St. Rose of Lima.

Most unfinished works were completed by Ercole Ferrata, e.g.:

- Martyrdom of Saint Eustace in Sant'Agnese in Agone, Rome (1660–69). Cafà's terracotta is in the Museo di Palazzo Venezia in Rome. In 2014, Vella published his discovery of a wax bozzetto by Cafà for this marble relief.
- Saint Thomas of Villanova distributing alms in the church of Sant'Agostino in Rome (1663–69). Cafà's terracotta is housed in MUŻA in Valletta.
- Marble statue of Pope Alexander III in the Duomo in Siena (from 1665/66).
- Marble statue of Saint Paul in St. Paul's Grotto, Rabat, Malta (1666–69).

== Sources ==
- Preimesberger, Rudolf (1973). "CAFÀ, Melchiorre". Dizionario Biografico degli Italiani (in Italian). Vol. 16: Caccianiga–Caluso. Rome: Institute of the Italian Encyclopaedia. pp. 230–235. ISBN 978-88-12-00032-6.
- Gerhard Bissell, in: Allgemeines Künstlerlexikon, vol. 15, 1997, pp. 493–495 (in German)
- Keith Sciberras (ed.), Melchiorre Cafà. Maltese Genius of the Roman Baroque, Valletta 2006 (individual entries in English or Italian)
- Guido, Sante; Mantella, Giuseppe (2010). Melchiorre Cafà insigne modellatore. La Natività, l'Adorazione dei pastori e altre opere in cera (in Italian). Soveria Mannelli: Rubbettino. ISBN 978-8849829105.
