= Ludovica Albertoni =

Italian Franciscan tertiary and blessed

Blessed Ludovica Albertoni, TOSF
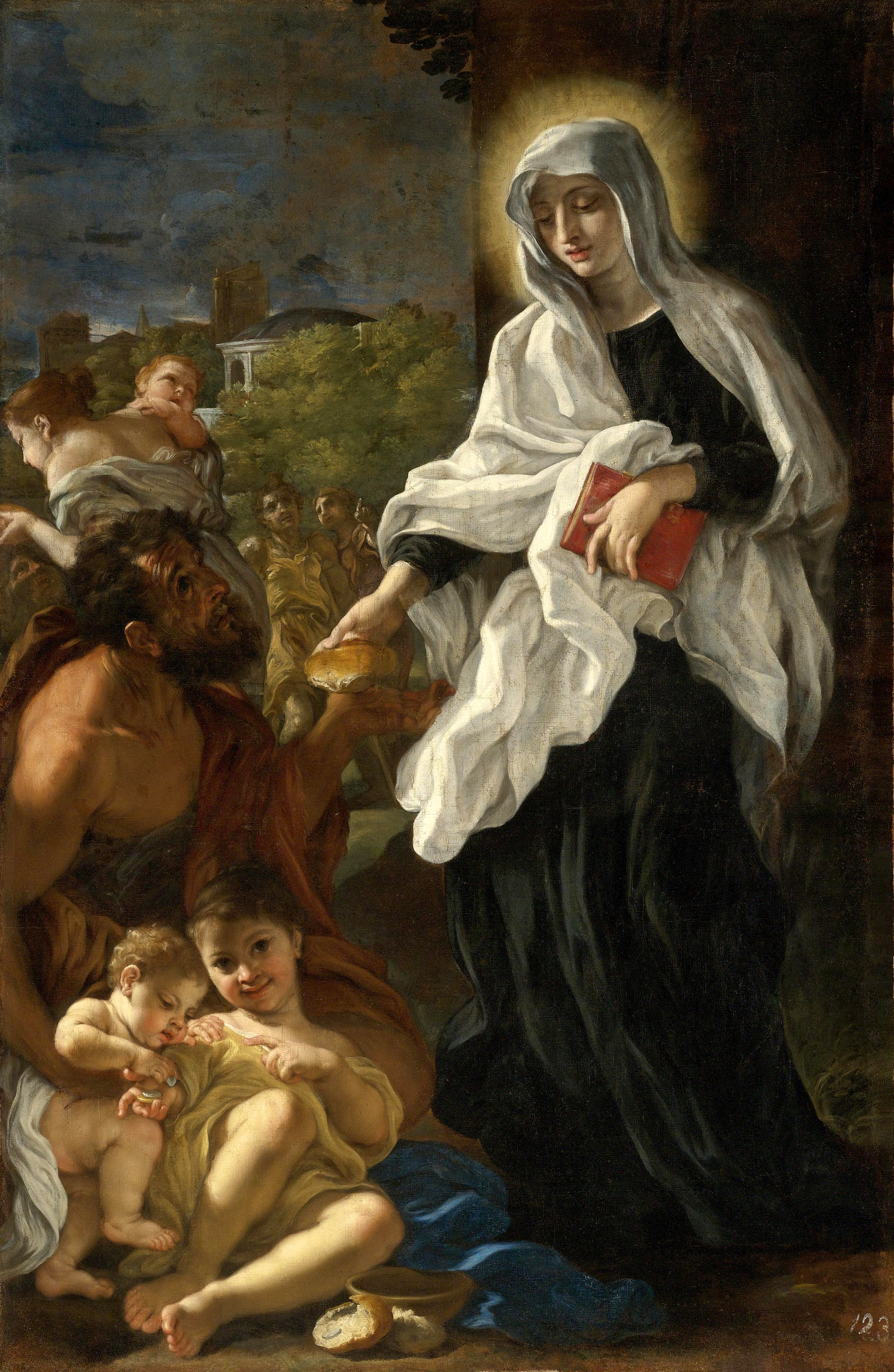
- The Blessed Ludovica Albertoni distributing Alms (Giovanni Battista Gaulli ca. 1670)
- Born: 1473; Rome
- Died: 31 January 1533 (aged 60); Rome
- Venerated in: Roman Catholic Church (Diocese of Rome, Secular Franciscan Order)
- Beatified: 28 January 1671, Basilica of Santa Maria Maggiore, Papal States by Pope Clement X
- Major shrine: San Francesco a Ripa, Rome, Italy
- Feast: 31 January
- Patronage: Rome

Ludovica Albertoni (1473 – 31 January 1533) was an Italian Roman Catholic noblewoman from the Renaissance period and a professed member of the Third Order of Saint Francis. The death of her husband prompted her to dedicate her life to the service of the poor in Rome and she was also known for her ecstatic experiences.

Her fame for holiness became widespread in Rome and devotion to her remained intense after her death which prompted Pope Clement X to approve her beatification in 1671.

== Life ==
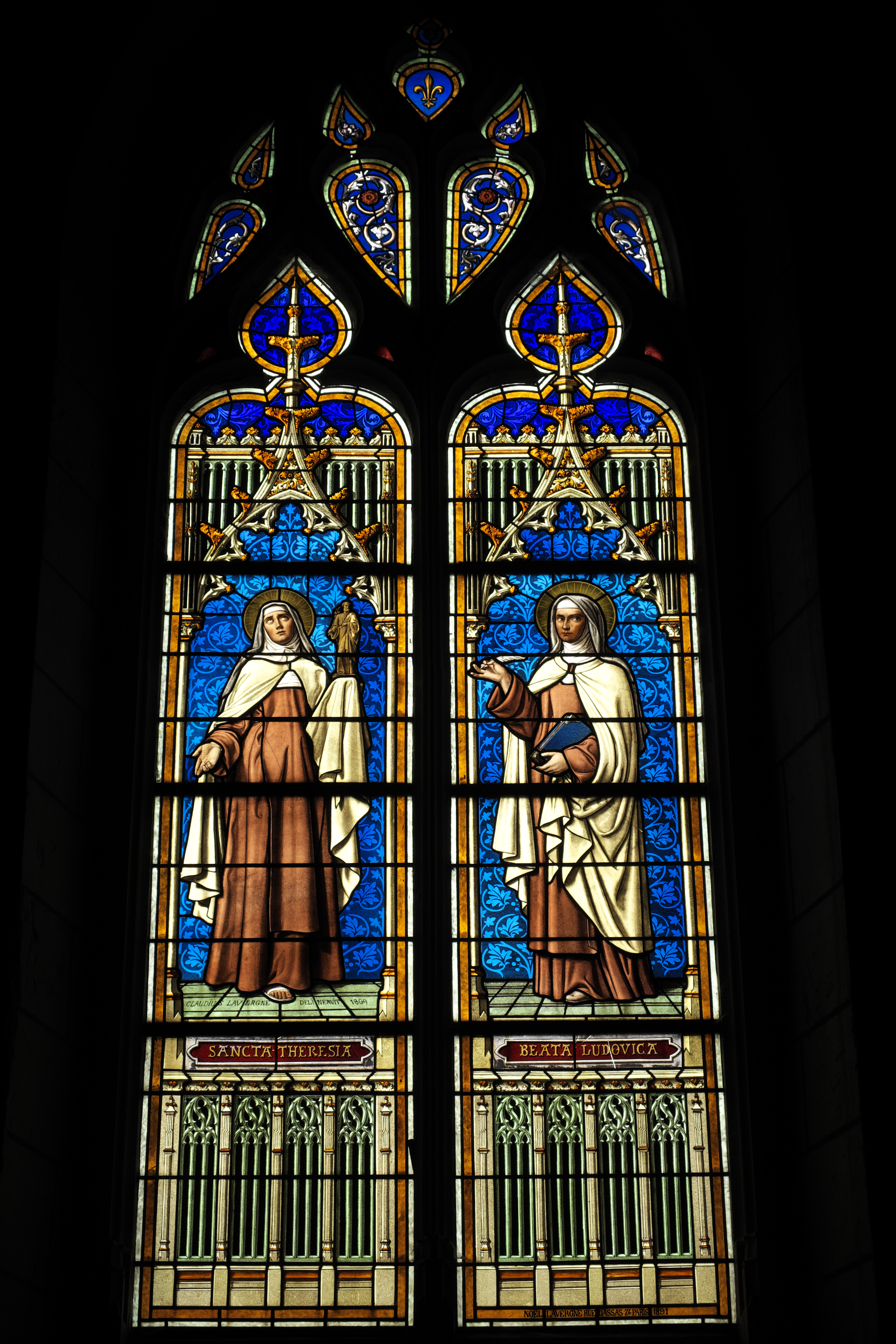
Stained glass windows depicting Saint Theresa of Avila (left) and Ludovica Albertoni (right)

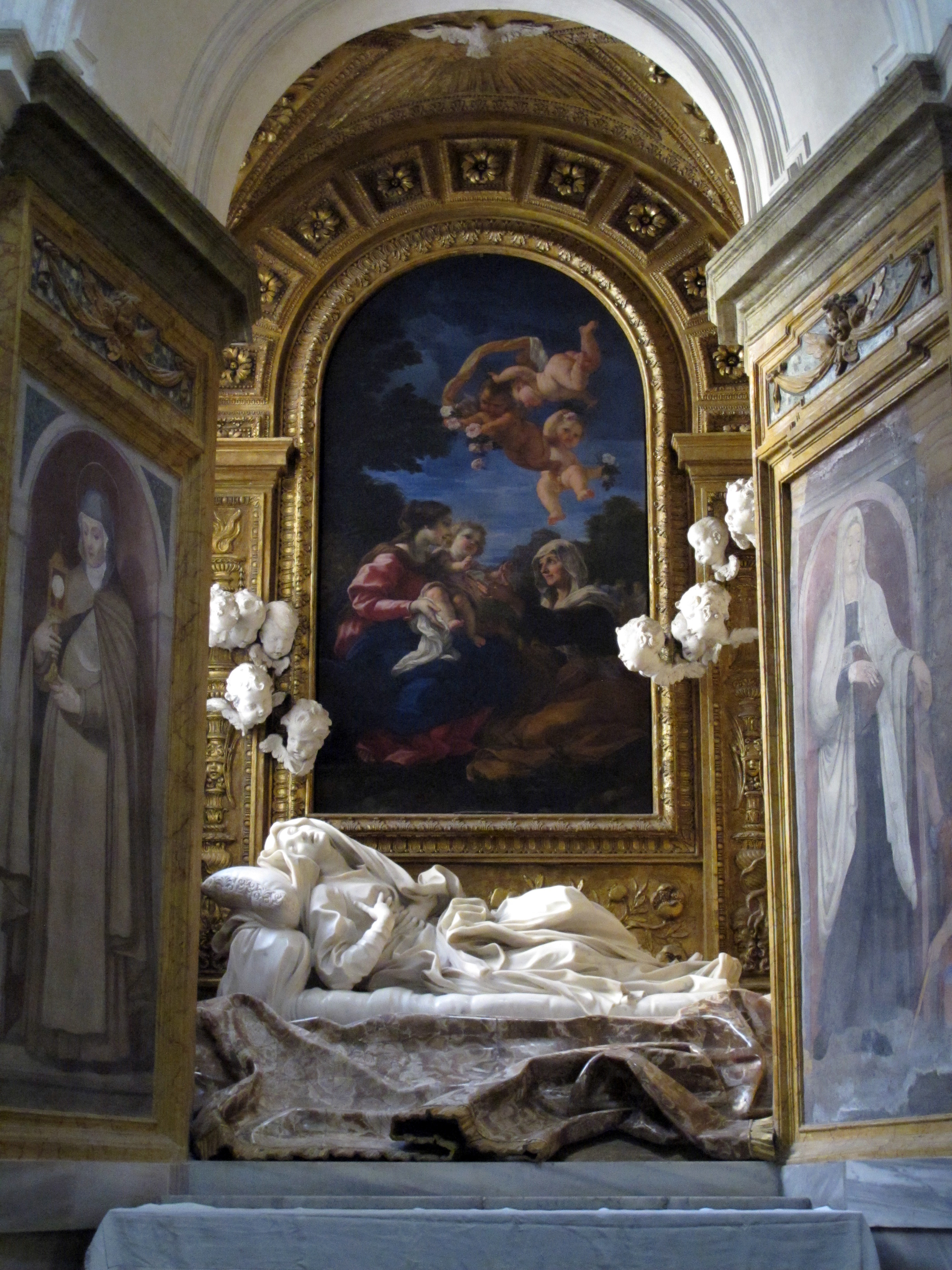
Bernini's sculpture of Albertoni in the Altieri chapel of San Francesco a Ripa.

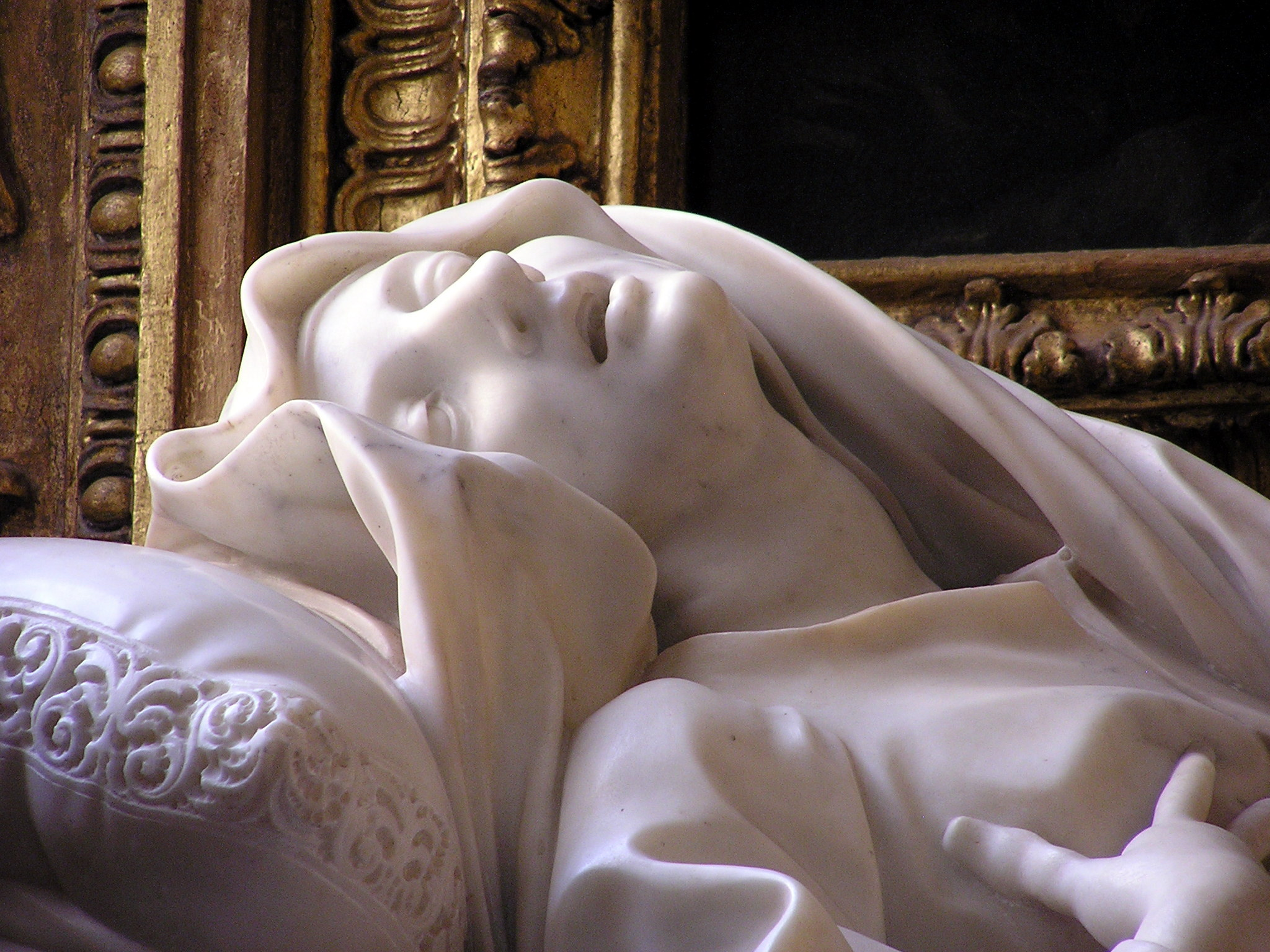
Close up of Bernini's sculpture

Ludovica Albertoni was born in 1473 in Rome to the prominent nobles Stefano Albertoni and Lucretia Tebaldi. Her father died around 1475 and she was entrusted to the care of her paternal aunts who saw to it that she had a Christian education.

Her parents had arranged her betrothal and in obedience she married the nobleman Giacomo della Cetera in 1494. The couple moved to Trastevere where they raised three daughters, but it was a turbulent marriage since her husband possessed a sharp and often unpleasant temperament. However, she remained docile in her faith and steadfast while believing in her husband's love for her despite his coldness. In May 1506 he died after a long illness leaving her widowed with her three children. Difficulties arose when her brother-in-law Domenico did not respect her rights regarding her inheritance. Albertoni fought him in court and won with her late spouse's assets for her and their daughters.

Not long after this loss she joined the Third Order of Saint Francis at the San Francesco a Ripa church in Trastevere. She spent her fortune and her health caring for the poor. Albertoni became renowned for her religious ecstasies (including levitation) and became known as a miracle worker. In 1527 she tended to the poor during the Sack of Rome and for her efforts at alleviating the suffering became known as the "mother of the poor".

In December 1532, news spread that her health was worsening and Albertoni died not long after from a fever on 31 January 1533; her final words were those of Christ's last words on the Cross. Her remains were interred in the Saint Anne chapel at San Francesco a Ripa as was her wish. On 17 January 1674 her remains were relocated to a grand altar in the same church that Gian Lorenzo Bernini had constructed.

=== Veneration ===
On 13 October 1606, the senate in Rome decreed the date of her death to be observed like a memorial and in 1625 the Roman authorities named her as a patroness for Rome while making her date of death akin to a liturgical feast.

Gian Lorenzo Bernini created a sculpture dedicated to her which is contained in San Francesco a Ripa where Albertoni's remains are placed.

== Beatification ==
On 28 January 1671 her beatification received approval from Pope Clement X, who voiced approval for her longstanding and popular "cultus" (otherwise known as an enduring public veneration). The pope signed the decree at the Basilica di Santa Maria Maggiore. Her liturgical feast is affixed to the date of her death, as is the norm.

== Bernini sculpture ==
Albertoni is best commemorated through Gian Lorenzo Bernini's sculpture entitled Beata Ludovica Albertoni, housed in the Altieri chapel in the San Francesco a Ripa church in Rome. The recumbent statue captures Albertoni in her death throes and depicts her as suffering, but also in the light of her religious ecstasies as she awaits her union with God.

== Other sources ==
- Hibbard, Howard (1990). Bernini. London: Penguin Books. ISBN 0-14-013598-7. (Original work published 1965)
- Perlove, Shelley Karen (1990). Bernini and the Idealization of Death: The Blessed Ludovica Albertoni and the Altieri Chapel. University Park: The Pennsylvania State University Press. ISBN 0-271-00684-6.
