= Ecstasy of Saint Teresa =

Sculpture by Gian Lorenzo Bernini

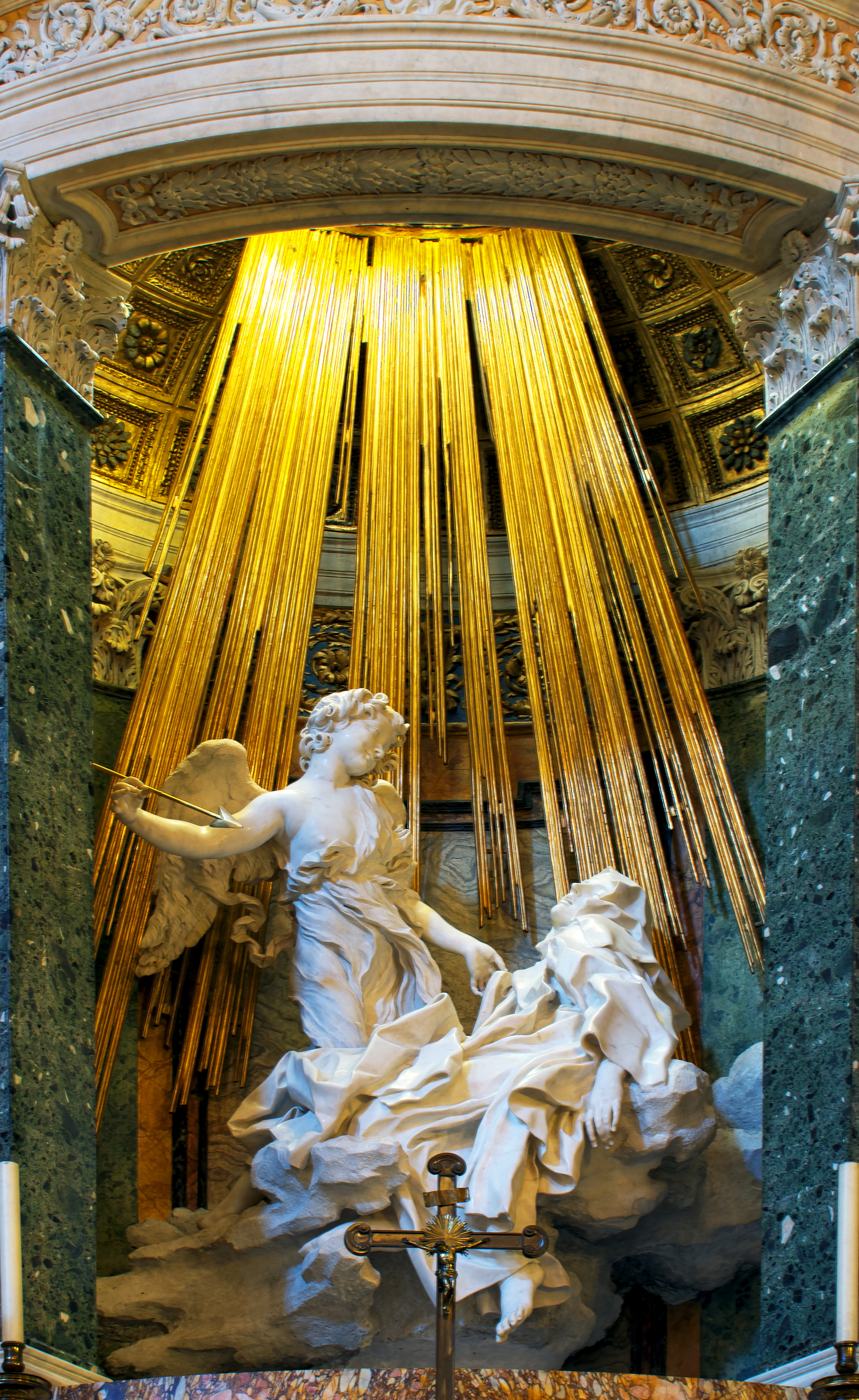
- Click on the map for a fullscreen view
- Artist: Gian Lorenzo Bernini
- Year: 1647–1652
- Catalogue: 48
- Type: Sculpture
- Medium: Marble
- Dimensions: Life-size
- Location: Santa Maria della Vittoria, Rome; 41°54′17″N 12°29′39″E
- Preceded by: Raimondi Chapel
- Followed by: Truth Unveiled by Time (Bernini)

The Ecstasy of Saint Teresa (also known as Saint Teresa in Ecstasy; Italian: L'Estasi di Santa Teresa or Santa Teresa in estasi) is a sculptural altarpiece group in white marble set in an elevated aedicula in the Cornaro Chapel of the church of Santa Maria della Vittoria in Rome. It was designed and carved by Gian Lorenzo Bernini, the leading sculptor of his day, who also designed the setting of the chapel in marble, stucco and paint. The commission was completed in 1652.

The ensemble includes at the sides two sets of donor portraits of members of the Cornaro family, who watch the main central group as though in boxes in a theatre. The group is generally considered to be one of the sculptural masterpieces of the High Roman Baroque. The sculpture over the altar shows Saint Teresa of Ávila, a Spanish Carmelite nun (1515–1582), swooning in a state of religious ecstasy, while an angel holding a spear stands over her, following her own account of a vision she had.

== Commission ==
The entire ensemble was overseen and completed by a mature Bernini during the Pamphili papacy of Innocent X. When Innocent acceded to the papal throne, he shunned Bernini's artistic services; the sculptor had been the favourite artist of the previous and profligate Barberini pope, Urban VIII. Without papal patronage, the services of Bernini's studio were therefore available to a patron such as the Venetian Cardinal Federico Cornaro (1579–1653).

Cornaro had chosen the hitherto unremarkable church of the Discalced Carmelites for his burial chapel. (Note: Cornaro had reason to avoid burial in Venice, since his appointment as a cardinal by Urban VIII while his father Giovanni was Doge had created a furor in his home-city, which banned families from holding such powerful positions simultaneously.) The selected site for the chapel was the left transept that had previously held an image of 'St. Paul in Ecstasy', which was replaced by Bernini's dramatization of a religious experience undergone and related by the first Discalced Carmelite saint, who had been canonised not long before, in 1622. It was completed in 1652 for the then princely sum of 12,000 scudi. (Note: Corresponding to c. $120,000)

A small format terracotta model of about 47 cm (19 in) was created between 1644 and 1647. The sculpture represents the first embodiment of the project, with traces of Bernini's fingerprints still visible. The model belongs to the Hermitage Museum's collection.

== Sculptural group and its setting ==
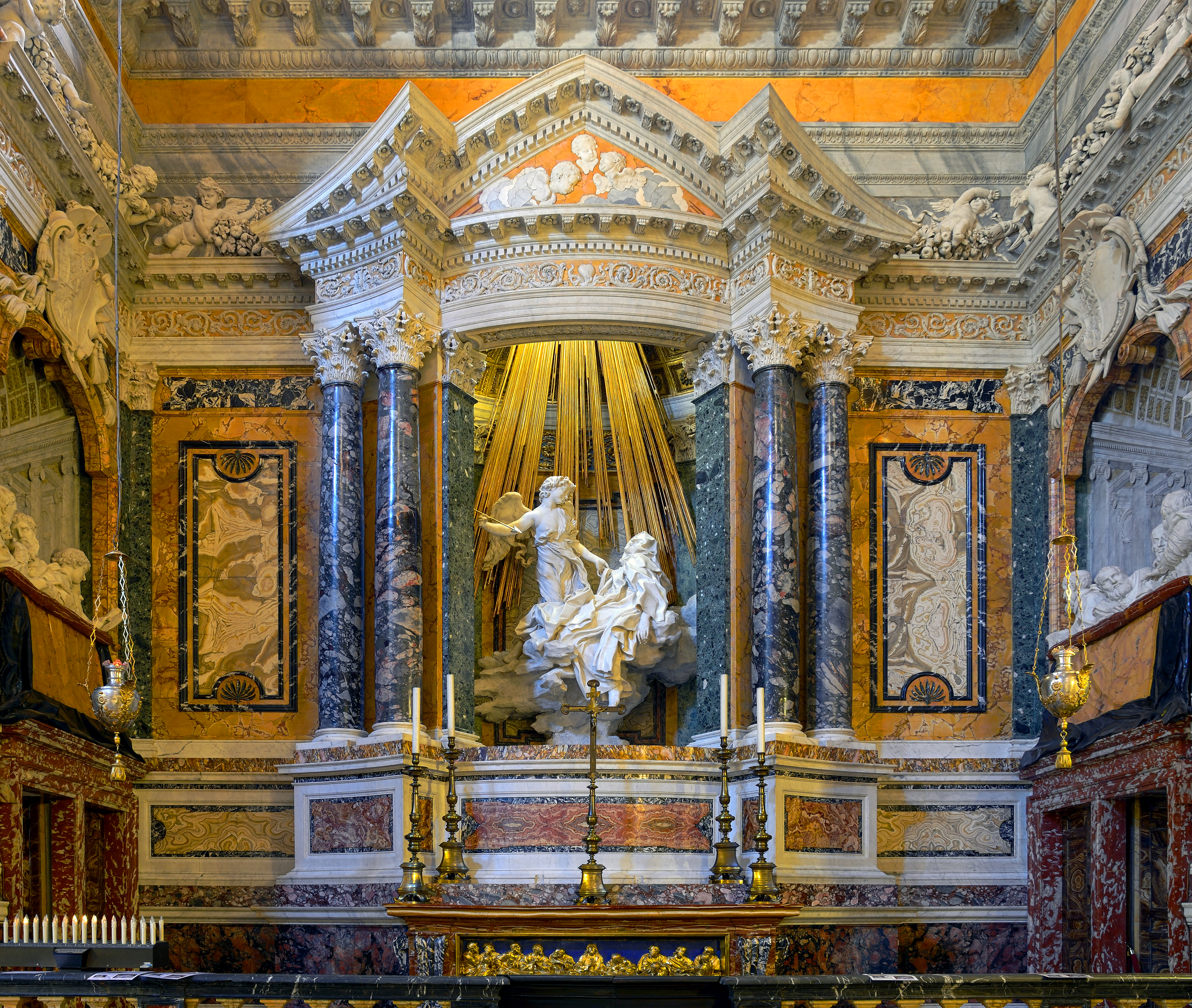
Wider view, including the Cornaro portraits, but omitting the lower parts of the chapel.

The two central sculptural figures of the swooning nun and the angel with the spear derive from an episode described by Teresa of Avila, a mystical cloistered Discalced Carmelite reformer and nun, in her autobiography, The Life of Teresa of Jesus. Her experience of religious ecstasy in her encounter with the angel is described as follows:

I saw in his hand a long spear of gold, and at the iron's point there seemed to be a little fire. He appeared to me to be thrusting it at times into my heart, and to pierce my very entrails; when he drew it out, he seemed to draw them out also, and to leave me all on fire with a great love of God. The pain was so great, that it made me moan; and yet so surpassing was the sweetness of this excessive pain, that I could not wish to be rid of it. The soul is satisfied now with nothing less than God. The pain is not bodily, but spiritual; though the body has its share in it. It is a caressing of love so sweet which now takes place between the soul and God, that I pray God of His goodness to make him experience it who may think that I am lying.

The group is illuminated by natural light which filters through a hidden window in the dome of the surrounding aedicule, and underscored by gilded stucco rays. Teresa is shown lying on a cloud indicating that this is intended to be a divine apparition we are witnessing. Other witnesses appear on the side walls; life-size high-relief donor portraits of male members of the Cornaro family, e.g. Cardinal Federico Cornaro and Doge Giovanni I Cornaro, are present and shown discussing the event in boxes as if at the theatre. Although the figures are executed in white marble, the aedicule, wall panels and theatre boxes are made from coloured marbles. Above, the vault of the chapel is frescoed with an illusionistic cherub-filled sky with the descending light of the Holy Ghost allegorized as a dove.

The art historian Rudolf Wittkower wrote:

In spite of the pictorial character of the design as a whole, Bernini differentiated between various degrees of reality, the members of the Cornaro Chapel seem to be alive like ourselves. They belong to our space and our world. The supernatural event of Teresa's vision is raised to a sphere of its own, removed from that of the beholder mainly by virtue of the isolating canopy and the heavenly light.

Gallery

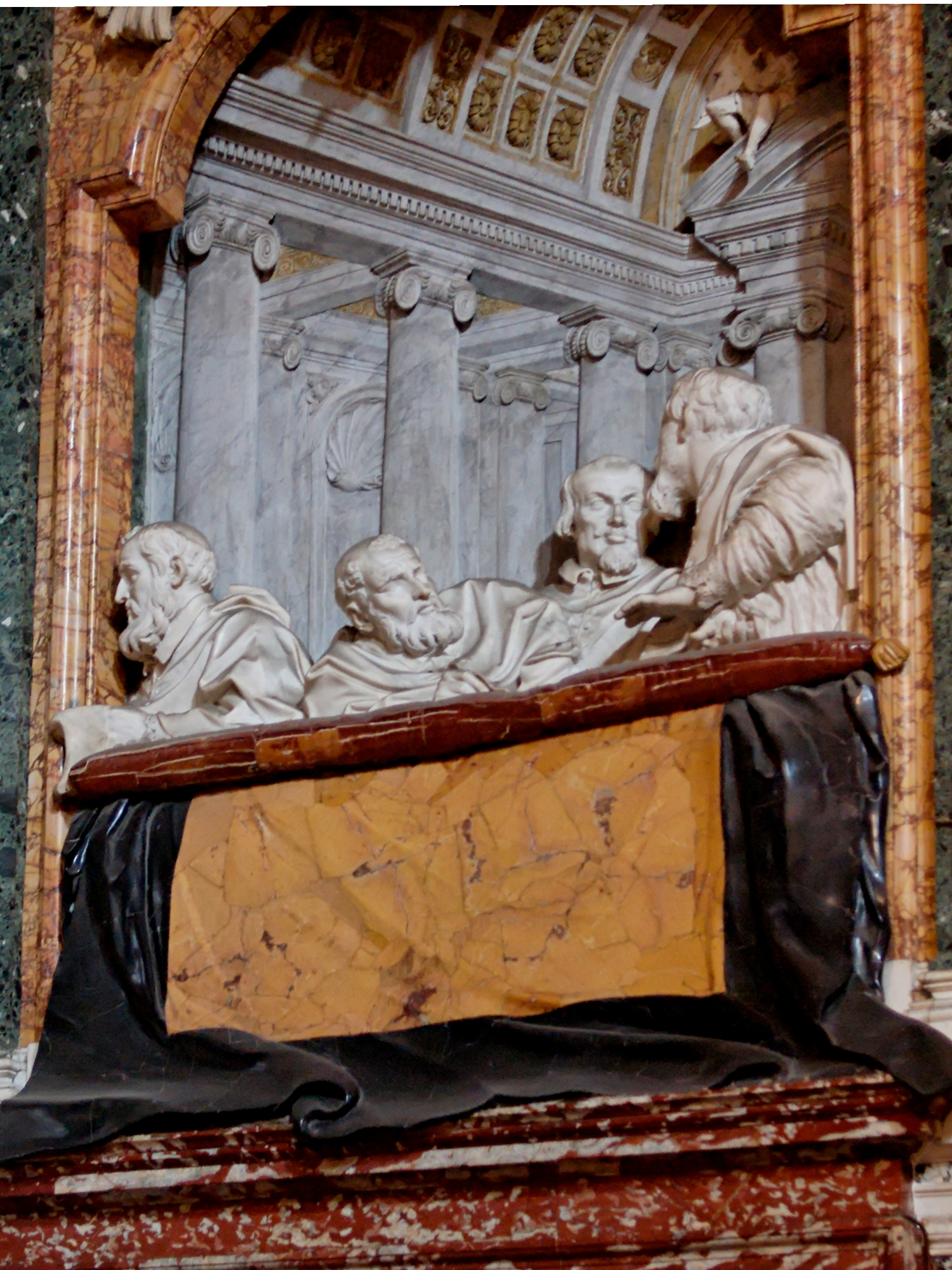

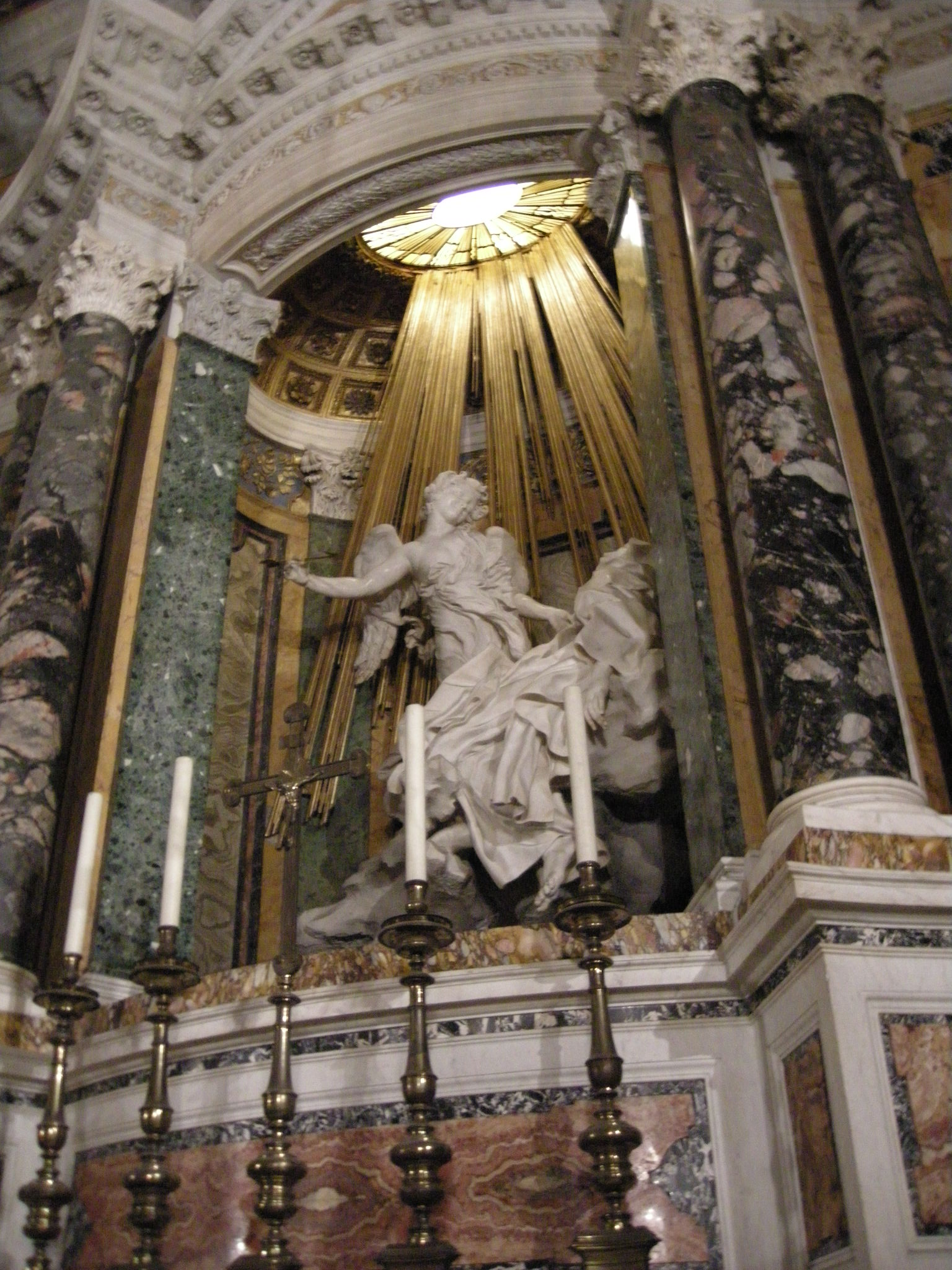

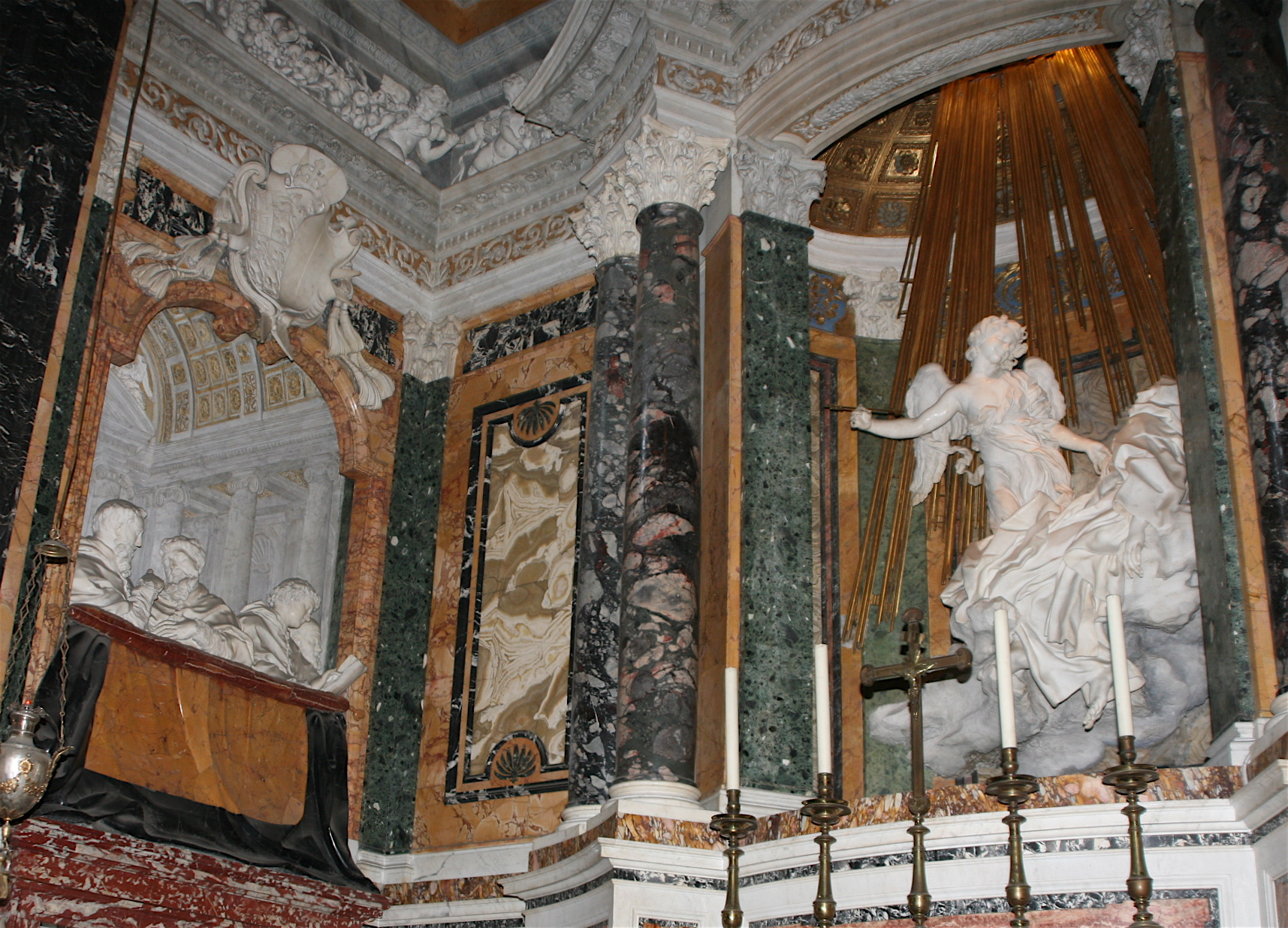

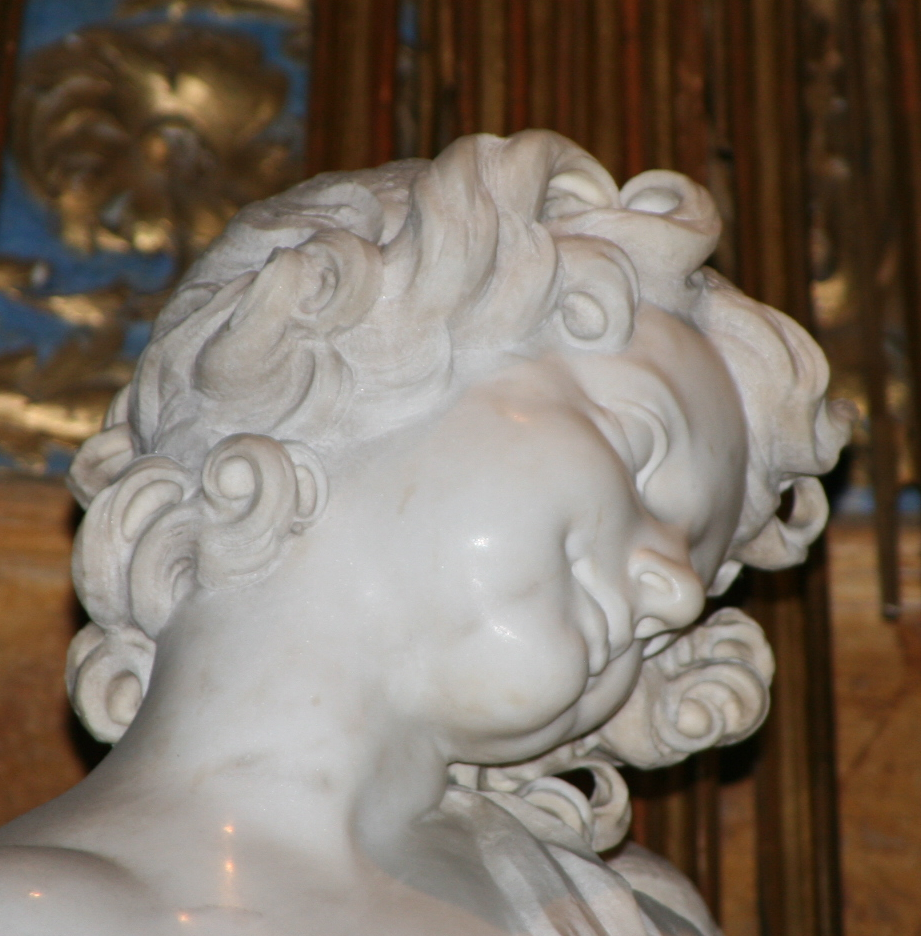

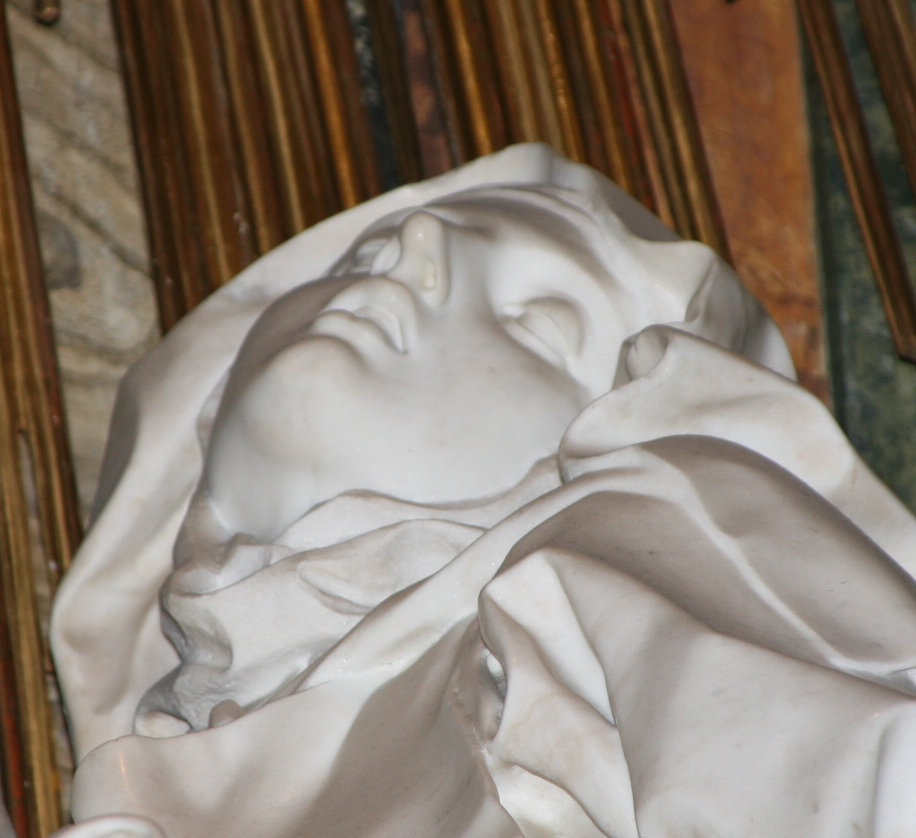

== Interpretations ==
The effects are theatrical, the Cornaro family seeming to observe the scene from their boxes, and the chapel illustrates a moment where divinity intrudes on an earthly body. Caroline Babcock speaks of Bernini's melding of sensual and spiritual pleasure as both intentional and influential on artists and writers of the day. Irving Lavin said "the transverberation becomes a point of contact between earth and heaven, between matter and spirit". As Bernini biographer Franco Mormando points out, although Bernini's point of departure for his depiction of Teresa's mystical experience was her own description, there were many details about the experience that she never specifies (e.g., the position of her body) and that Bernini simply supplied from his own artistic imagination, all with an aim of increasing the nearly transgressively sensual charge of the episode: "Certainly no other artist, in rendering the scene, before or after Bernini, dared as much in transforming the saint's appearance."

== Criticism ==
Some scholars argue that there are sexual implications of the work. It has been called "decidely (sic) risqué"; "the most astounding peep show in art"; and "the grossest and most offensive example of Baroque art." Some authors have argued that its popularity "has a lot to do with sex." And by placing the sculpture in a theatrical setting, Bernini is accused of turning "a private moment into a very public spectacle." Victorian art critic Anna Jameson wanted it destroyed: "even those least prudish in matters of art, would here willingly throw the first stone." Regarding arguments against sexual implications, Franco Mormando has said "none of these defenses are completely accurate." and Simon Schama, has argued: "Critics and scholars tie themselves in knots, trying to avoid stating the obvious."

Other scholars argue that there is no sexual content in the statue, saying:

1. Bernini faithfully followed Teresa's description of the experience.
2. The Church accepted that mystical union often involved erotic elements.
3. There is no nudity in the statue.

== Similar works by Bernini ==
- See also entry titled Bernini's Cornaro chapel found in the Baroque section.
- Death of the Blessed Ludovica Albertoni (1671–1674)—San Francesco a Ripa, Rome.
- Martyrdom of Saint Lawrence (1614–15)
- Truth Unveiled by Time (1646–1652) – Galleria Borghese, Rome.

== Influencing or influenced works ==
- Stefano Maderno's sculpture of St Cecilia in her eponymous church (1600).
- Melchiorre Caffà's Santa Rose of Lima (1665) and his Assumption of St Catherine.
- Francisco Aprile and Ercole Ferrata's Sant'Anastasia in her namesake church in Rome.
- Angels & Demons, the novel by Dan Brown which lists the sculpture as the third "Altar of Science" of the fictionalized Illuminati. Brown's book incorrectly states that the sculpture was moved from the Vatican to its current location, and that Pope Urban VIII (who was already deceased when Bernini worked on the sculpture) found the statue too sexually explicit.
- The sculpture is the subject of the song "The Lie" from Peter Hammill's album The Silent Corner and the Empty Stage.
- A notable Czech rock group, The Ecstasy of Saint Theresa, named themselves after the sculpture.
- In Infinite Jest by David Foster Wallace, the sculpture plays a role in the filmography of James O. Incandenza Jr. Wallace also alludes to it in three additional scenes involving Joelle.
- Street artist Banksy used the image of Saint Teresa in one of his works, though he removed the angelic figure and added a fast food meal.
- The sculpture and its image are frequently referred to in the novel Cutting for Stone by Abraham Verghese.
- In the psychoanalytic theories of Jacques Lacan, the statue plays an important role due to a central reference in his book Seminar XX: Encore. Lacan believes the statue helps convey his theory of the possibility of a female enjoyment that is infinite and unknowable, while masculine enjoyment is defined by finitude and failure. Some book covers of Seminar XX have a picture of the statue on the front.

== See also ==
- List of works by Gian Lorenzo Bernini

Preceded by Ludovisi Battle sarcophagus	Landmarks of Rome; Ecstasy of Saint Teresa	Succeeded by Raphael Rooms
