= San Francesco a Ripa =

San Francesco di Assisi a Ripa Grande
- Church of Saint Francis of Assisi by the River (English); Sancti Francisci Assisiensis ad Ripam Maiorem (Latin)
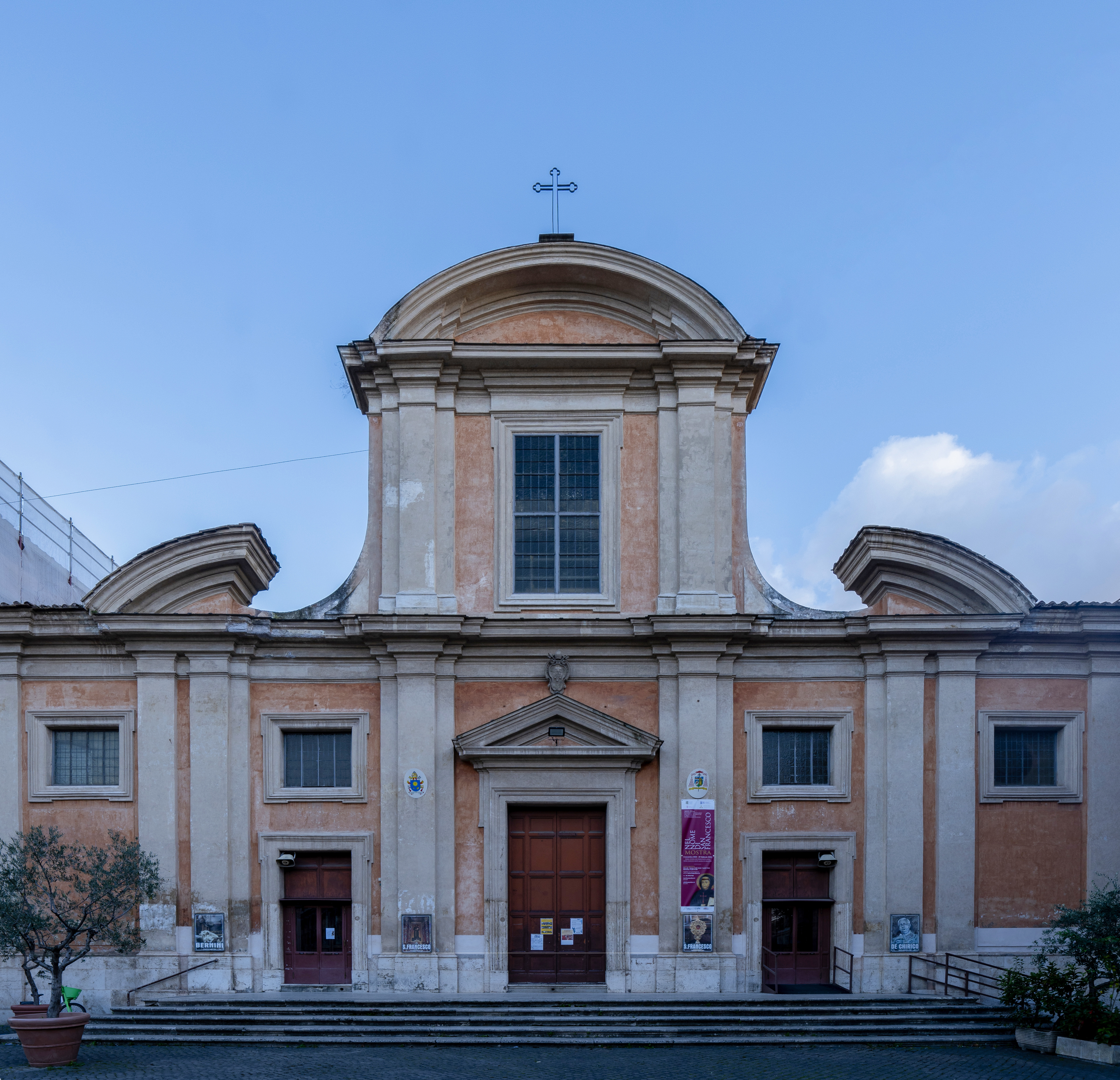
- Click on the map to see marker.
- 41°53′07″N 12°28′23″E
- Location: Piazza di S. Francesco d'Assisi 88; Rome
- Country: Italy
- Denomination: Catholic
- Religious order: Franciscan Friars Minor
- Website: sanfrancescoaripa.it

History
- Status: titular church
- Dedication: Francis of Assisi

Architecture
- Architect: Onorio Longhi
- Style: Baroque
- Groundbreaking: 12th century
- Completed: 1681–1701

Administration
- District: Trastevere

San Francesco a Ripa is a church in Rome, Italy. It is dedicated to Francis of Assisi who once stayed at the adjacent convent. The term Ripa refers to the nearby riverbank of the Tiber.

== History ==
The origins of this church are related to a Franciscan convent in the Trastevere quarter of Rome, which in 1231 annexed a church dedicated to Saint Blaise (San Biagio). This church was decorated with the St Francis cycle by Pietro Cavallini, now lost. This cycle probably served as the prototype for the famous Legend of St. Francis frescoes ascribed to Giotto di Bondone in the Upper Basilica of St Francis in Assisi. The construction of the present church was begun in 1603 by Onorio Longhi, starting with the apse. The facade was finished in 1681–1701 with designs by Mattia de Rossi. From 1873 to 1943 the church was used as barracks by the Bersaglieri.

== Interior ==
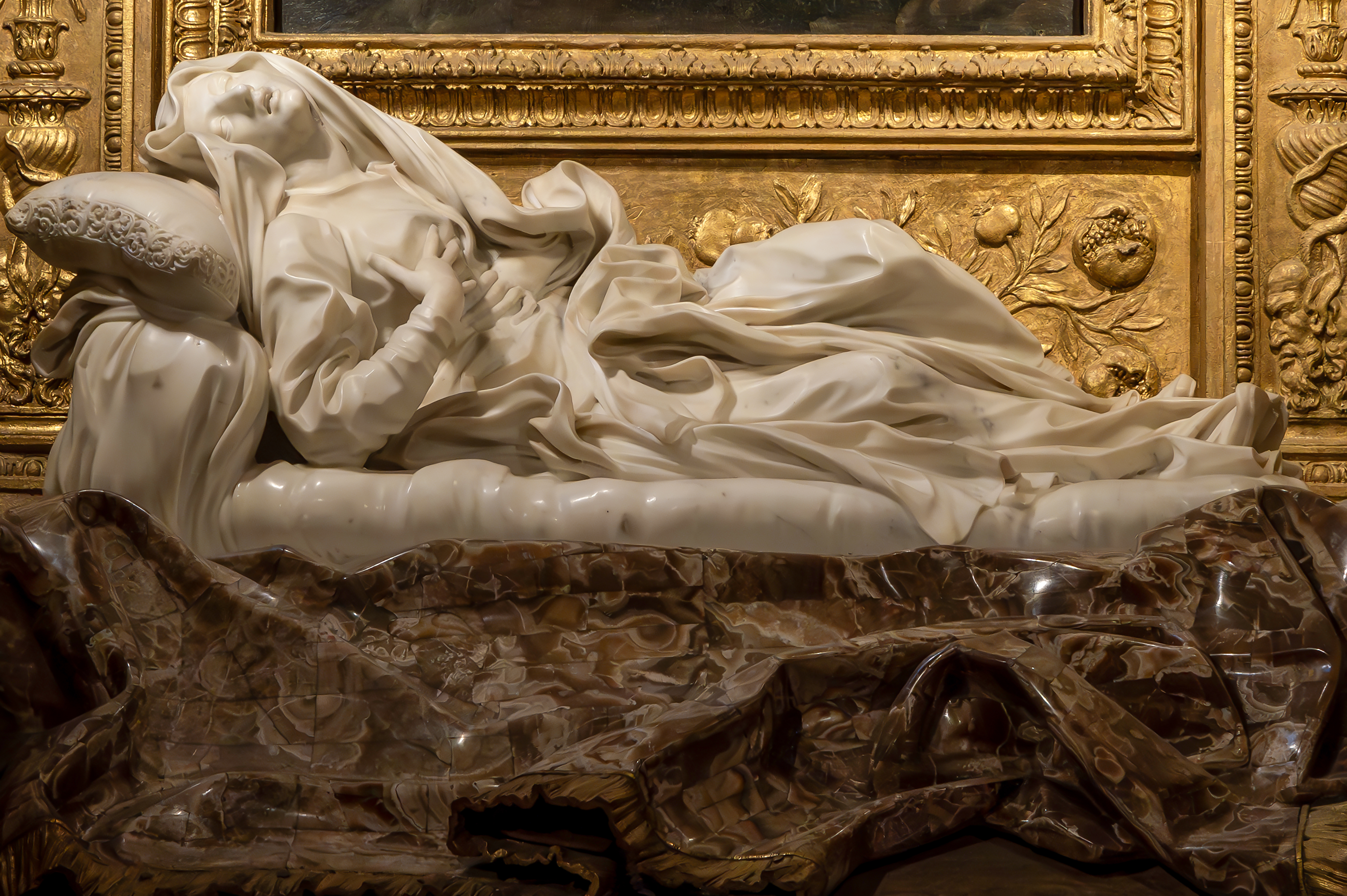
Gian Lorenzo Bernini's statue Blessed Ludovica Albertoni in the Paluzzi-Albertoni chapel

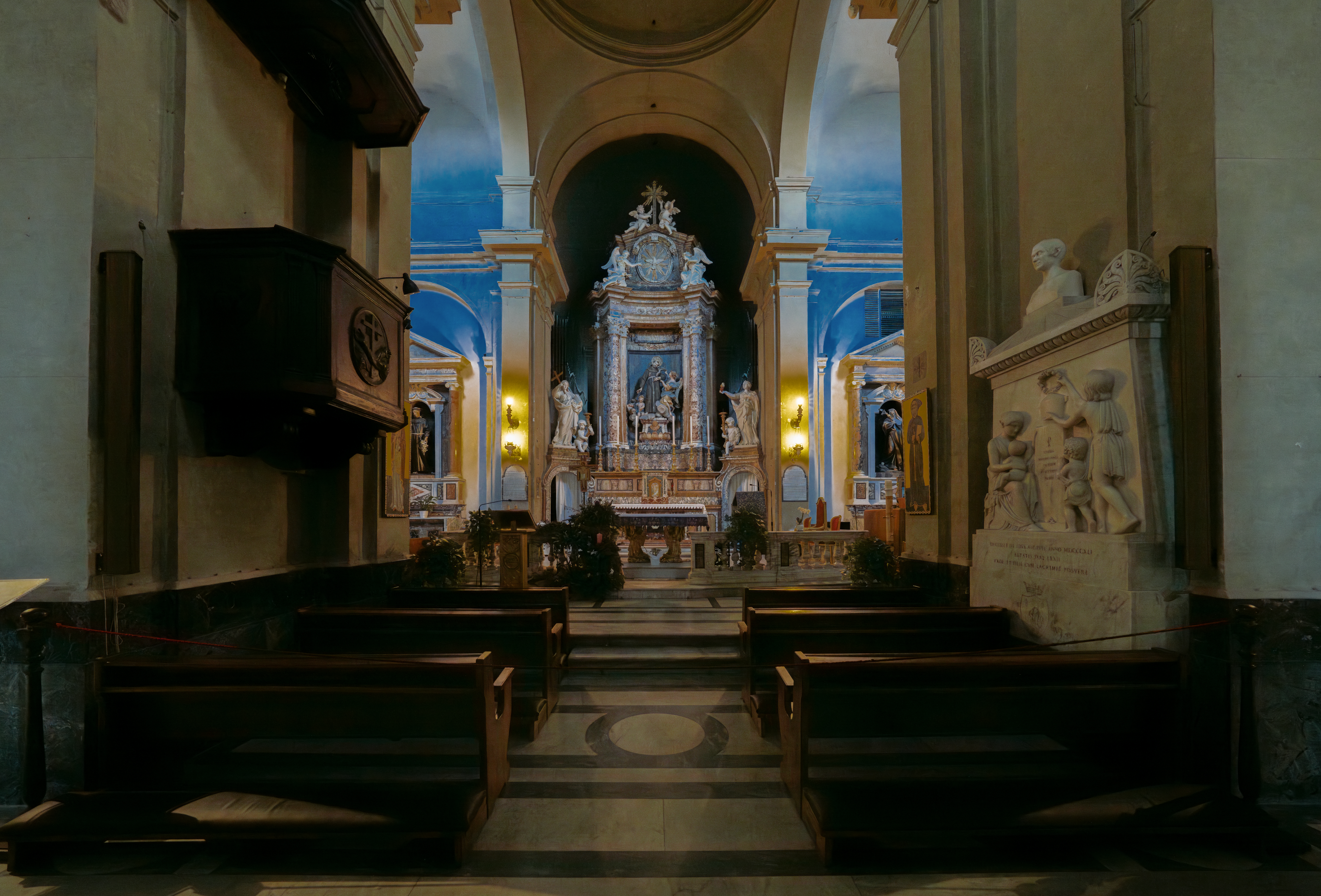
Interior of the church

In the first chapel of the right, there are frescoes by Fra Emanuele da Como and monument to Cardinal Michelangelo Ricci by Domenico Guidi. In second, Domenico Maria Muratori frescoed events from the life of San Giovanni from Capestrano (1725). In the third chapel, is an altarpiece (1685) by Stefano Maria Legnani. In the transept is the chapel of the Rospigliosi-Pallavicini, started by Nicolas Michetti and completed by Ludovico Rusconi in 1725. Inside the altarpiece depicts San Pietro d' Alcantara and San Pasquale Baylon painted by Tommaso Chiaro and the funeral monuments of Stefano and Lazzaro Pallavicini, Maria Camilla, and Giambattista Rospigliosi based on designs of Michetti. The main altar was completed in 1746. The Saint Francis is attributed to Fra Diego da Careri, the Trinity canvas by Paris Nogari.

In the left transept, the chapel Paluzzi-Albertoni designed by Giacomo Mola (1622–1625). Inside this chapel is one of Bernini's masterpieces, his Beata Ludovica Albertoni (1671–1675). This sculpture readily recalls the recumbent Ecstasy of Saint Teresa in Santa Maria della Vittoria. Behind the statue is a painting of Saint Anna and the Virgin by Giovanni Battista Gaulli. In third chapel on the left is a bust of Laura Frangipani sculpted by Andrea Bolgi (1637), on the forehead wall bust by the Orazio Mattei attributed to Lorenzo Ottoni. In the second chapel, frescoes by Giovanni Battista Ricci. To the center an Annunciation (1535) by Francesco Salviati. The tomb of Giuseppe Paravicini, an ancestor of the Emperor Napoleon I of France, was sculpted by Camillo Rusconi. In the first chapel is a painting by Marten de Vos (1555), to the right is an Assumption by Antonio della Corna, on the left, a Birth of the Virgin (1620) by Simon Vouet. On the same left transept the chapel of San Carlo hosts the remains of Saint Charles of Sezze, that died in the hospital of the church in 1670.

Notable also is a copy of an alleged portrait of St. Francis by the friar Margaritone d'Arezzo: if confirmed, it would be the first true portrait in the history of Italian arts (the original is in the Pinacoteca Vaticana). The church houses also, in the cell where the saint lived, a black stone he had used as a cushion. In the garden of the friary is an orange tree, which according to the tradition was planted by St Francis.

The square in front of the church has one Ionian column erected by Pope Pius IX, taken from the ruins of Veii.

== List of Cardinal Protectors ==
This is the seat of cardinalatial title of Sancti Francisci Assisiensis ad Ripam Maiorem.

- Laurean Rugambwa 31 March 1960 – 8 December 1997
- Norberto Rivera Carrera 21 February 1998 – present

== Burial ==
- Antonino da Patti, 16th century
- Giorgio de Chirico

== Bibliography ==
- Federico Gizzi, Le chiese barocche di Roma
