= Santi Luca e Martina =

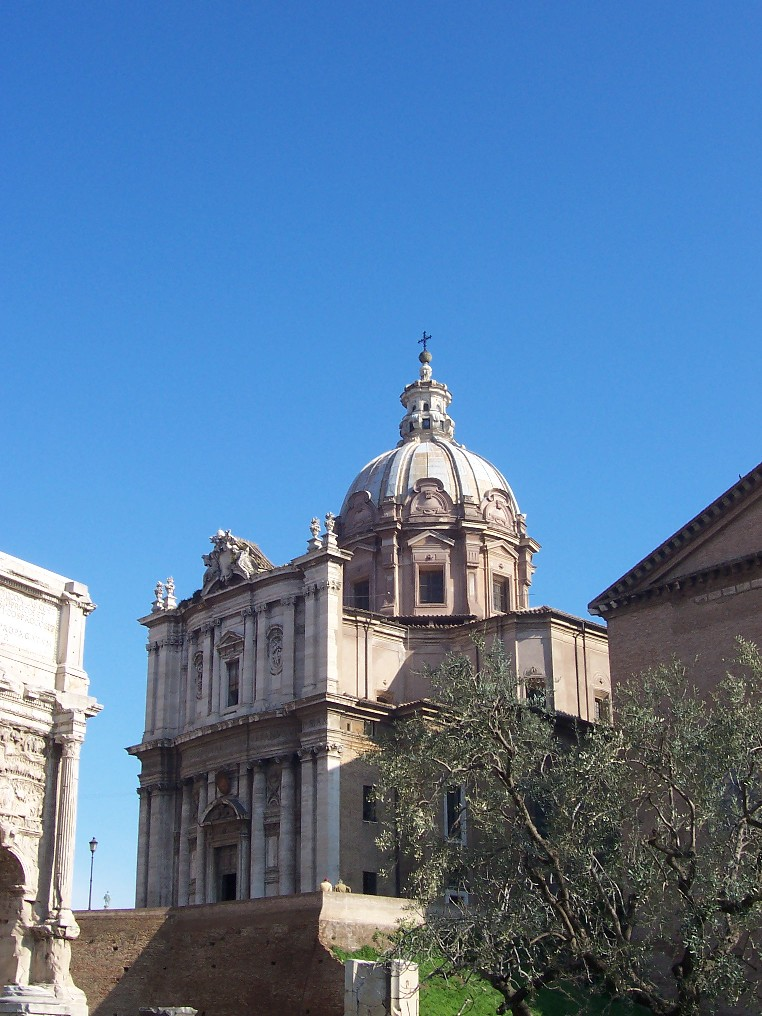
- The church of Santi Luca e Martina with the remains of the Roman Forum.
- Click on the map for a fullscreen view
- 41°53′36″N 12°29′06″E
- Location: Roman Forum, Rome
- Country: Italy
- Denomination: Catholic

Architecture
- Architectural type: Church

Santi Luca e Martina is a church in Rome, Italy, situated between the Roman Forum and the Forum of Caesar and close to the Arch of Septimus Severus.

== History ==
The church was initially dedicated to Saint Martina, martyred in 228 AD during the reign of Emperor Alexander Severus. In 625 Pope Honorius I commissioned construction of the church. Restored first in 1256 during the reign of Pope Alexander IV, it was a simple rectangular structure surrounded on three sides by other constructions until it was rebuilt by the painter and architect, Pietro da Cortona, in the seventeenth century.

In 1577 the Accademia di San Luca, the academy of painters, sculptors and architects in Rome, was founded and in 1588 it was given the church which was rededicated as S. Luca in S. Martina. The academy undertook minor refurbishments of the church and also there were projects for a new church prepared in drawings attributed to Ottaviano Mascherino (1536–1606). Gradually the academy began to acquire properties adjacent to the church.

In 1634, Pietro da Cortona was elected president of the academy. Almost at once he began restoration of the crypt and, as was common at this time in Rome, buried remains were found and were attributed to the martyred Saint Martina. No doubt it was hoped that this would precipitate an influx of funds to shelter the relics in a new church. In November 1634, Pope Urban VIII visited the church, and the papal nephew, Cardinal Francesco Barberini, who had been protector of the church since 1626, dedicated 6,000 scudi although their full support for a new building seems to be in some doubt. Construction of the new edifice began in 1635 but was subject to interruptions such as Cortona's extended visit to Florence from 1639–47 and Francesco Barberini's flight from Pope Innocent X to Paris from 1645-48. At the time of Cortona's death in 1669, some parts, such as the interior dome decoration, were still incomplete.

== Overview ==
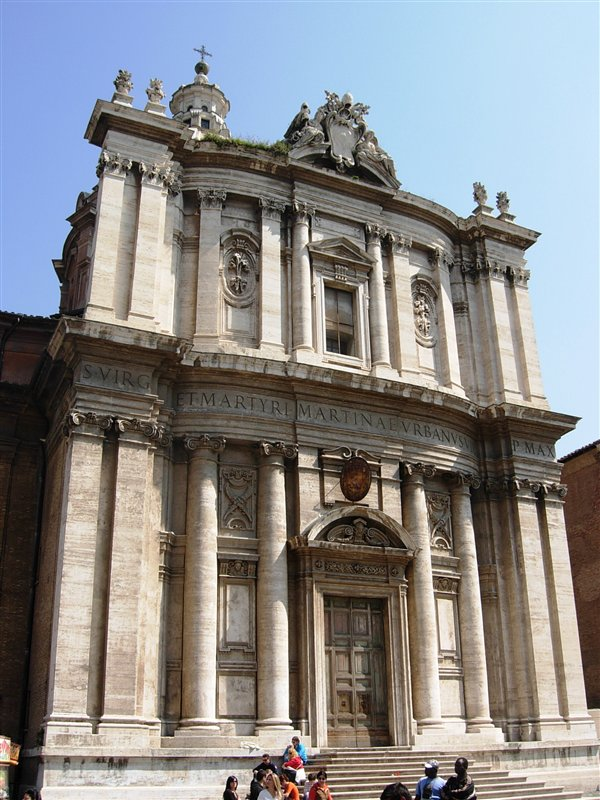
Façade

The plan of the upper church is almost a Greek cross with nearly equal arms and the centre is crowned by the dome. Large Ionic columns, supporting a large entablature, cluster around the crossing and populate the wall spaces of the apsidal transepts, choir and nave. The windows in the apsidal vaults are each surmounted by a split pediment with a head in a scallop shell with octagonal coffering above, motifs which Cortona used in his fresco painting. However, apart from the altarpieces, the interior is white stucco; a surprising design decision for a church dedicated to the patron saint of painters (St. Luke), built for the painting academy in Rome, and by a painter who had decorated some of the most opulent church vaults in Rome, such as Santa Maria in Vallicella. The interior dome decoration has been attributed to Cortona's pupil and collaborator, Ciro Ferri; ribs and coffering are combined as they are at Santa Maria della Pace but here the forms of the coffering are far more fluid and almost shimmer with movement.

Two stairways from the upper church lead down to the lower church that has a corridor connecting to an octagonal chapel directly below the dome of the upper church and the chapel of Santa Martina below the high altar. A circular opening in the vault of the octagonal chapel allows a view through up to the dome of the upper church. In contrast to the white spatial expansiveness of the upper church, the lower church, and particularly the chapel of Santa Martina, is richly decorated with colour, marbles, gilt bronze and has relatively low vaults. In the Chapel of Santa Martina, the Ionic columns in the corners have been placed on the diagonal, reminiscent of Michelangelo's design of the Sforza Chapel in Santa Maria Maggiore, and so setting up oblique as well as orthogonal tensions in this chapel centred on the altar to S. Martina.

The gentle curvature of the facade is contained by a double storey of paired pilasters The columns of the ground storey are pressed into the wall rather than projecting as a spatial entity like the entrance portico at Santa Maria della Pace. Other elements such as pediments and mouldings are allowed to project between the columns to create spatial tensions which are reminiscent of Florentine Mannerism.

In the upper church, the main altarpiece Saint Luke painting the Madonna was painted by Antiveduto Grammatica, and is a copy of the original attributed to Raphael found now in art collection of the Accademia. Below this is a white marble statue of the martyred S. Martina by Nicolo Menghini. In the left transept is an Assumption and Saint Sebastian by Sebastiano Conca, and in the right transept is the Martyrdom of San Lazzaro by Lazzaro Baldi who is buried here. Inside the main entrance door to the upper church, a stone slab marks Cortona's burial place (died 1669) and there is a wall memorial with a bust of Cortona by Bernardo Fioiti in the lower church.

The sculptures of the Evangelists in the pendentives of the dome are 18th-century additions sculpted by Filippo della Valle, Camillo Rusconi, and Giovanni Battista Maini. To the right of the entrance is the monument to Carlo Pio Balestra (1776) by Tommaso Righi and a Monument to Giovanna Garzoni by Mattia De Rossi.

In the sacristy is a relief of the Ecstasy of St Mary Magdalene by Alessandro Algardi.

== See also ==
- 17th-century Western domes
