= Filippo della Valle =

Italian sculptor

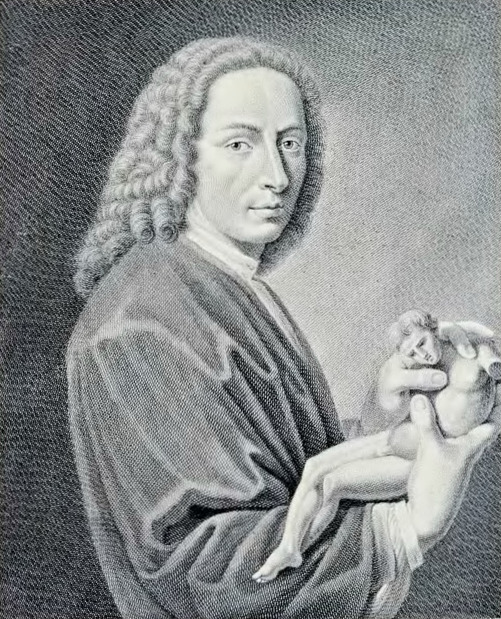
- Born: 26 December 1698; Florence
- Died: 29 April 1768 (aged 69); Rome
- Occupation: Sculptor, engraver

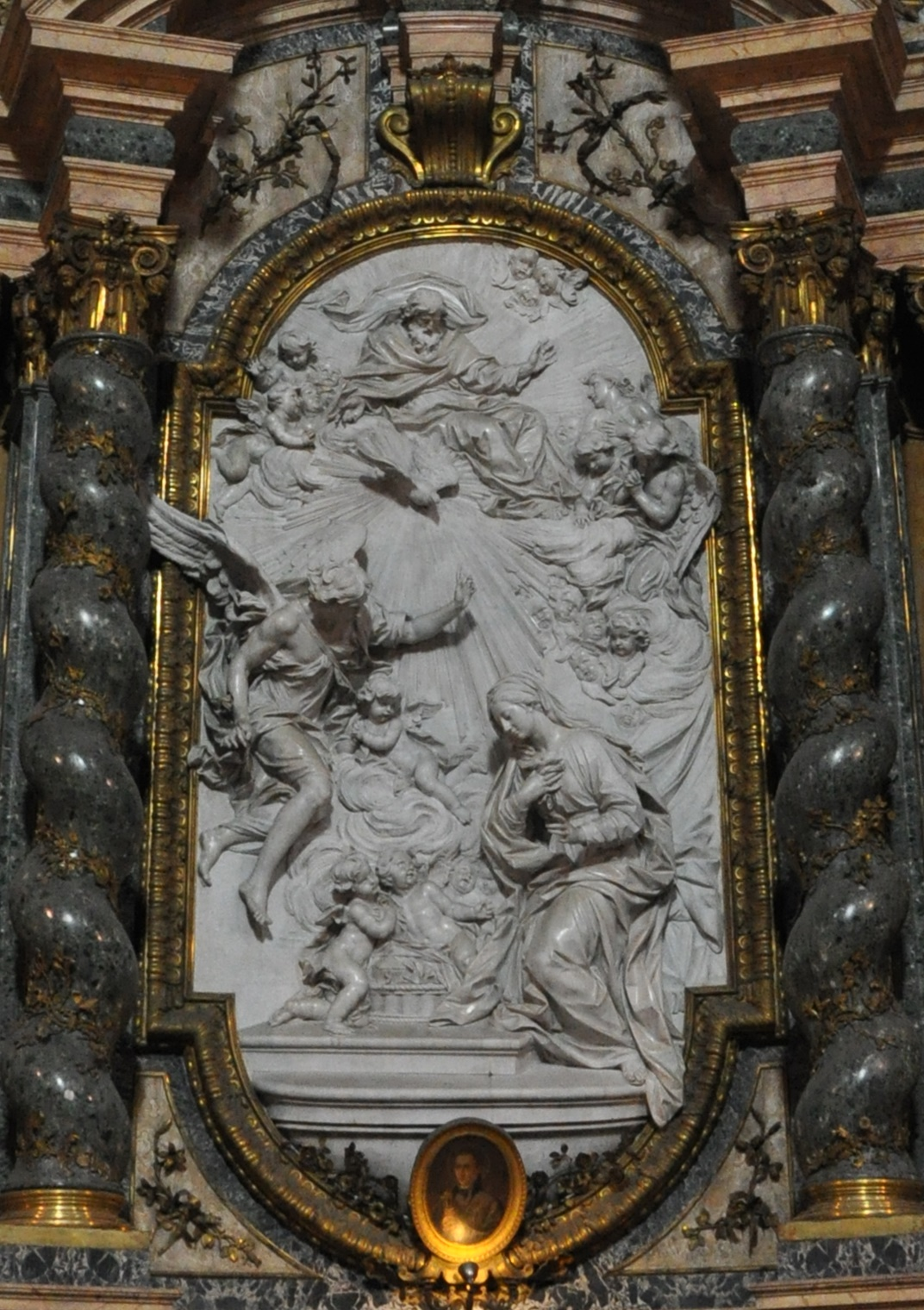
Bas-Relief of the Annunciation at the church of Sant'Ignazio in Rome.

Filippo della Valle (26 December 1698 – 29 April 1768) was an Italian late-Baroque or early Neoclassic sculptor, active mostly in Rome.

== Biography ==
Della Valle was born in Florence.

Initially apprenticed with Giovanni Battista Foggini in Florence alongside Giovanni Battista Maini, he, and later Maini, moved to Rome to work with Camillo Rusconi. In 1725, della Valle won a contest of the Academy of St Luke together with Pietro Bracci, and was later to become the director or Principe of that group. In Rome, he worked with Bracci on Nicola Salvi's Trevi Fountain, where he completed the allegorical statues of Health and Abundance.

Della Valle masterpiece is his Annunciation relief (1750) for the church of Sant'Ignazio in Rome, a much more restrained and flatter relief than that of Bernardino Cametti's elaborate 1729 treatment of the same theme now at the Basilica of Superga. This reflected a Neoclassical influence beginning to affect Late Baroque Roman sculpture, moving away from the theatrical to a more sober elocution of the subject. Another contrast can be found in Pierre Legros the Younger's handling of the relief depicting St Aloysious Gonzaga in Glory (1698), which stands across from Della Valle's Annunciation in Sant'Ignazio.

In 1750, he completed a funerary monument to Manuel Pereira de Sampaio, Portuguese ambassador to the Holy See, in the Church of Sant'Antonio dei Portoghesi.

He also completed the statue of Temperance (1734) in the Corsini Chapel at San Giovanni in Laterano. The statue recalls Francois Duquesnoy's pioneering early baroque, yet soberly classic, Santa Susanna. In this chapel, della Valle, working with Maini, shows the influence of the Florentine Massimiliano Soldani Benzi. In style, della Valle was allied to the rising group of French sculptors in Rome including Michelangelo Slodtz.

He also completed the monument for Innocent XII (1746) and a Santa Teresa of Avila (1754) for St Peter's Basilica.

He died in Rome and was buried at Santa Susanna.

== Works ==
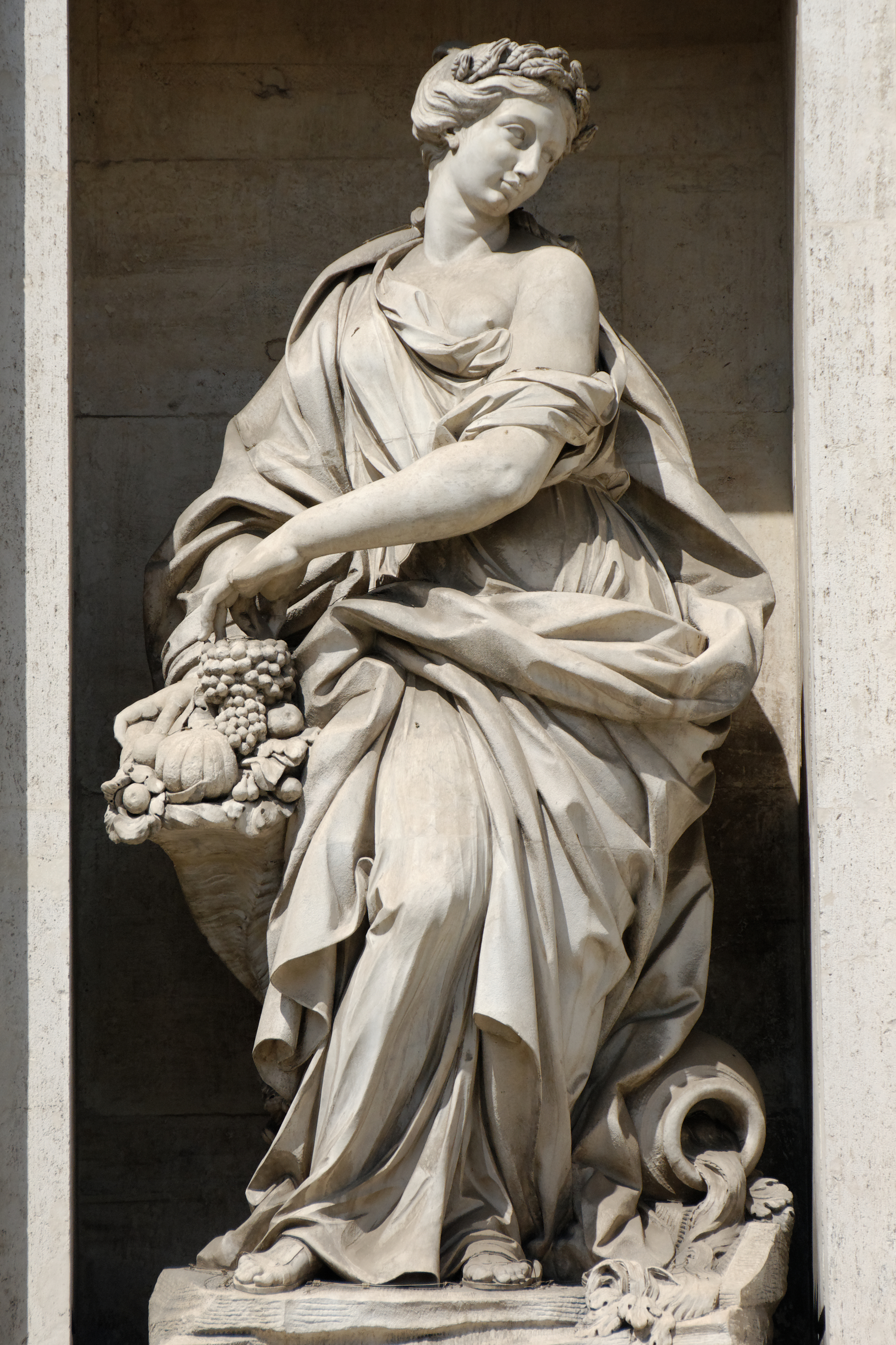
Abundance, Trevi Fountain, Italy

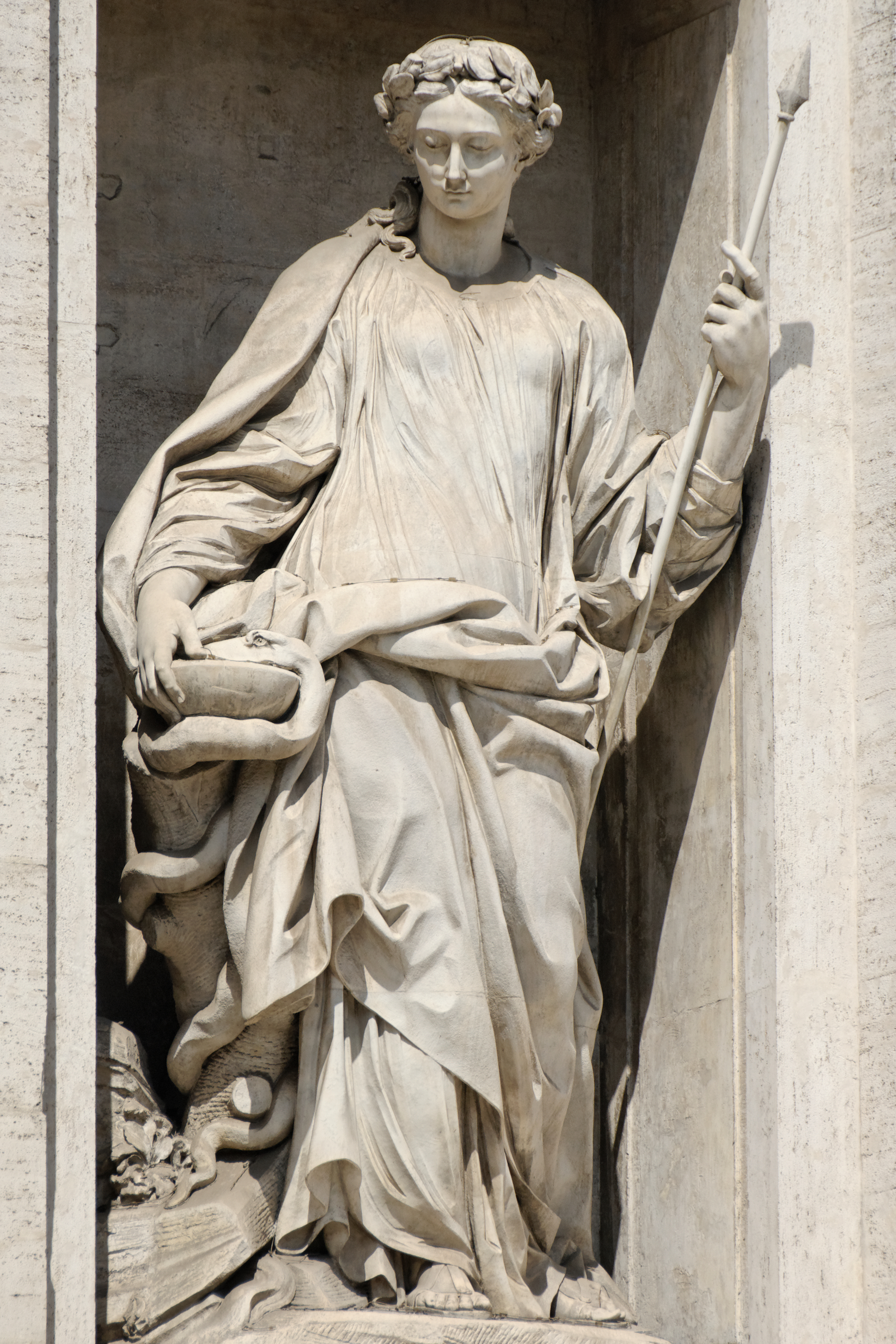
Health, Trevi Fountain, Italy

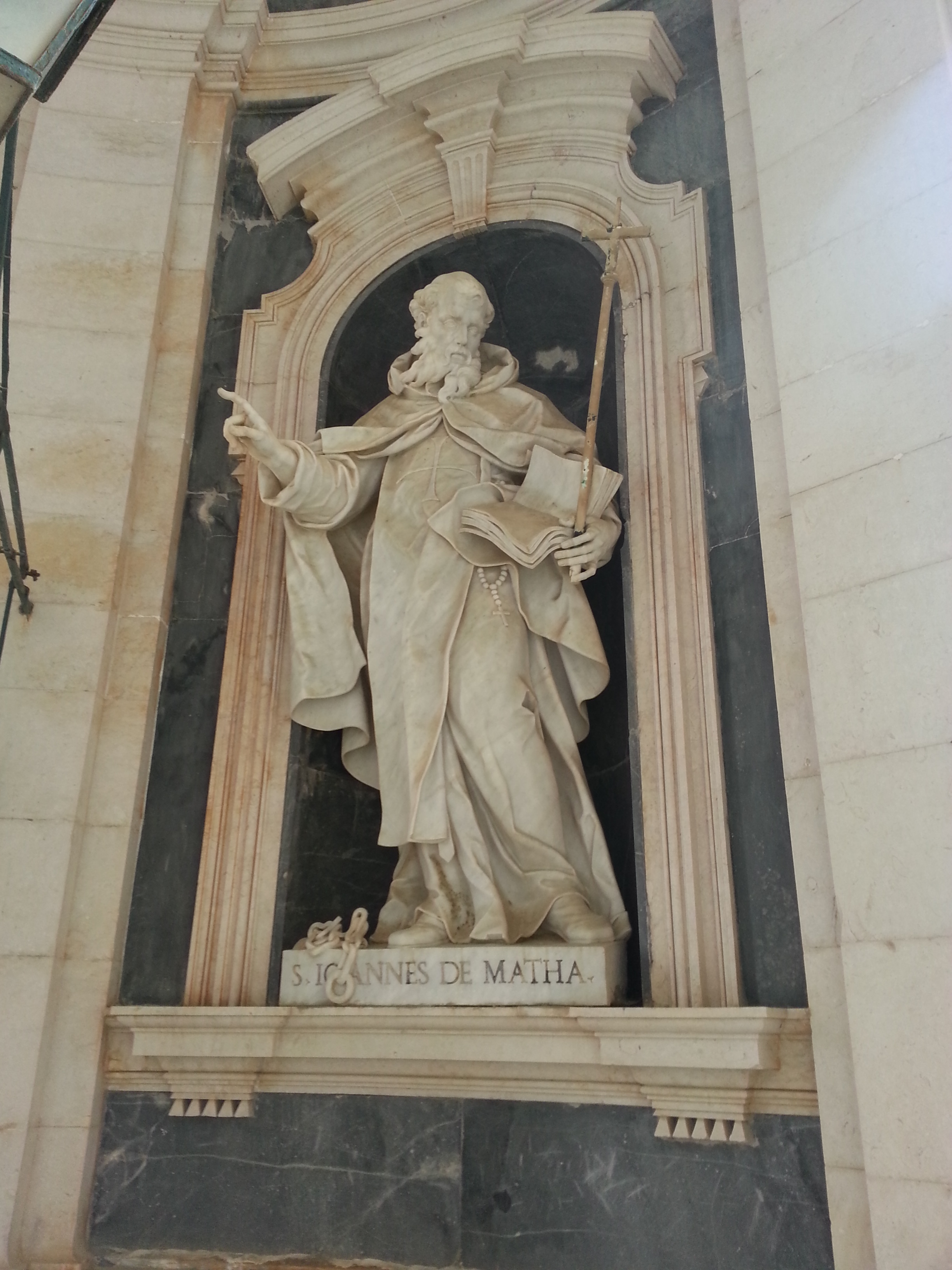
Saint John of Matha, Basilica of Mafra National Palace, Portugal

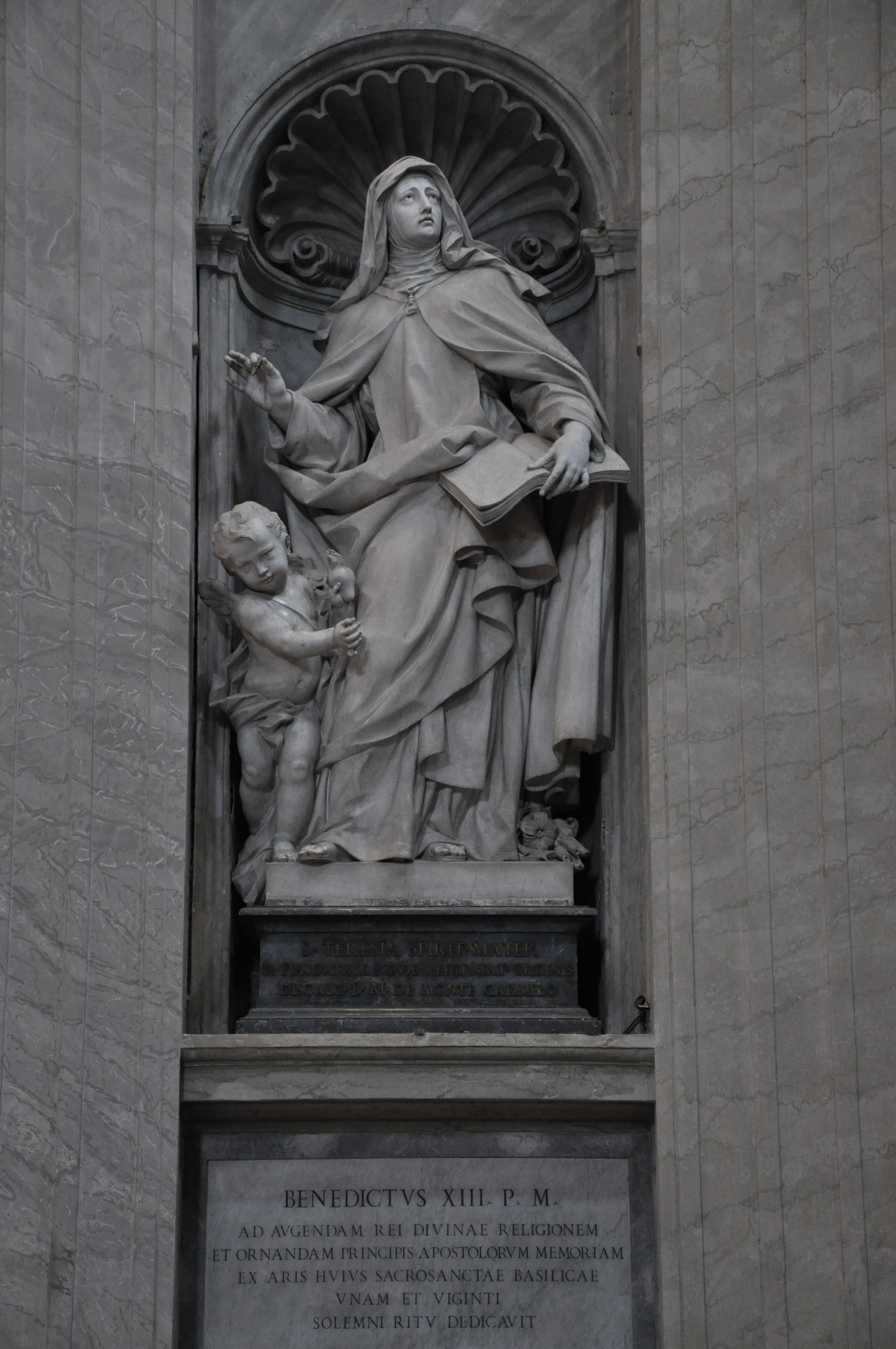
Saint Teresa of Ávila, Saint Peter's Basilica, Vatican

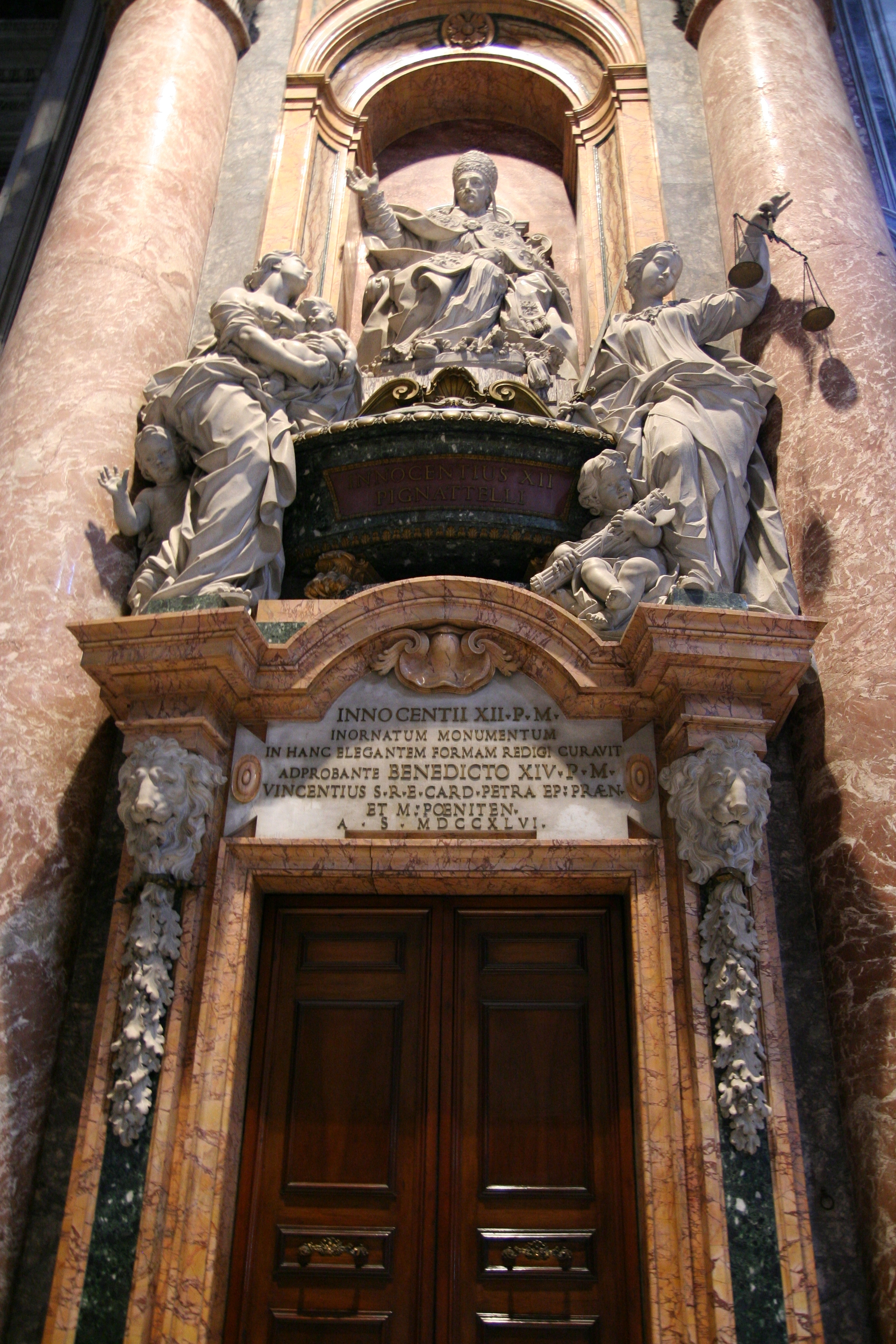
Innocent XII's monument, St Peter's Basilica

== Sources ==
- Bruce Boucher (1998). Thames & Hudson, World of Art (ed.). Italian Baroque Sculpture. pp. 169, 208–209.
- Web Gallery of Art
