= Bernardino Cametti =

Italian sculptor

Bernardino Cametti (1669–1736) was an Italian sculptor of the late Baroque period.

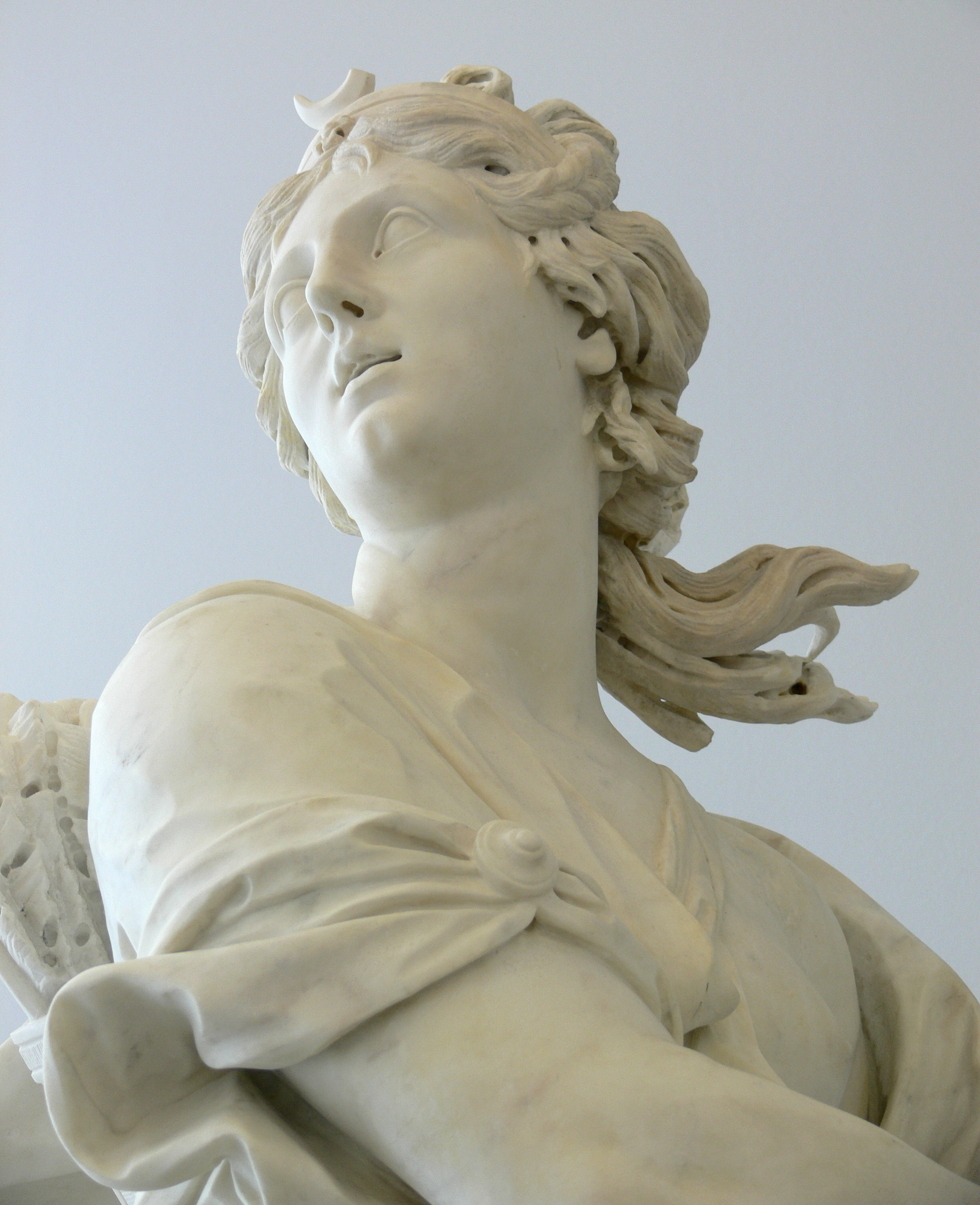
Cametti: Hunting Diana, Rome 1717/1720 (Bode-Museum, Berlin)

== Biography ==
Cametti was born in Rome. Among his earliest works was a marble relief of the Canonization of St Ignatius (1695–1698) for the Church of the Gesù, based on a design by Andrea Pozzo, and a Monument to Count Vladislav Constantine Wasa (Stimmate di San Francesco, 1698–1700), commissioned by Cardinal Giovanni Francesco Albani (later pope Clement XI). In 1704, he helped complete the marble decoration on the facade of the cathedral of Frascati. Around 1706, he completed the Monument to Gabriele Filipucci for the archbasilica of St John the Lateran, Rome. That year he gained the title of nobility of cavaliere and became a member of the Congregation of the Virtuous of the Pantheon.

In around 1717, he participated in a team led by Camillo Rusconi, creating the memorial monument in St. Peter's basilica for Gregory XIII. Cametti mainly worked on the relief of the sarcophagus representing the Institution of the Gregorian Calendar. The relief was completed by Carlo Mellone.

In 1716, he completes the statues of St Luke and St. Mark, for the Church of the Madonna di San Luca in Bologna. He sculpted an Allegory of Charity for a chapel in the church of Monte di Pietà in Rome (1721–24), He completed the busts of Maria Vincentina and Giovanni Muti, for their family chapel at San Marcello al Corso.

Cametti's family originally came from Gattinara in the Piedmont, hence it was not surprising that after initially working in the studio of Lorenzo Ottoni in Rome, he was contracted to work in Turin to complete sculptural altar relief of the Annunciation(1729) for the Basilica di Superga, built by Juvarra, who also influenced the commission. For the main altar, he made a relief commemorating the victory by the divine intervention of the House of Savoy over the forces of Louis XIV in the siege of Turin in 1706. Agostino Cornacchini (1686–1754) also contributed reliefs to the church. Cametti's relief influenced Filippo della Valle's relief of the Annunciation for the church of Sant'Ignazio in Rome.

In 1714, he travelled to Orvieto to sculpt cornice decoration for the chapel of Signorelli in the dome. He also received commissions for two large marble statues of St. Simon and St. Jacob the minor.

Cametti also completed statues of angels crowning the St. Francis Regis altar of the church of the Descalzas Reales in Madrid, which features a large relief by Rusconi. A Hunting Diana (1720) in the Bode-Museum of Berlin is by Cametti. His Monument to prince Taddeo Barberini in the church of Santa Rosalia in Palestrina in 1704 reflects a change in tomb sculptural designs, moving away from the emotive memento mori of high baroque towards more serene attention to eternal fame and glory. He also completed the monument to Cardinal Antonio Barberini in the same church.
