= Sanni (disambiguation) =

The Sanni (Georgian: სანები) were an ancient western Georgian tribe.

Sanni is also a Finnish common given name and family name. It may refer to:

== Persons ==
Given name

- Sanni Ahola (born 2000), Finnish ice hockey goaltender
- Sanni Kurkisuo (born 1993), Finnish singer, songwriter, and actress, better known by the mononym Sanni
- Sanni Leinonen (born 1989), Finnish alpine skier
- Sanni Utriainen (born 1991), Finnish javelin thrower

Last name

- Domingo Maria Sanni (18th century), Italian painter and architect of the late Baroque period, active in Spain
- Olayinka Sanni (born 1986), American professional basketball player

== Various ==
- "Sanni", song by Finnish rock band Ripsipiirakka from their 2003 album Punkstars
- Sanni Yakuma, sometimes known as Daha ata sanniya, traditional Sinhalese exorcism ritual
