= Giovanni Battista Maini =

Italian sculptor (1690–1752)

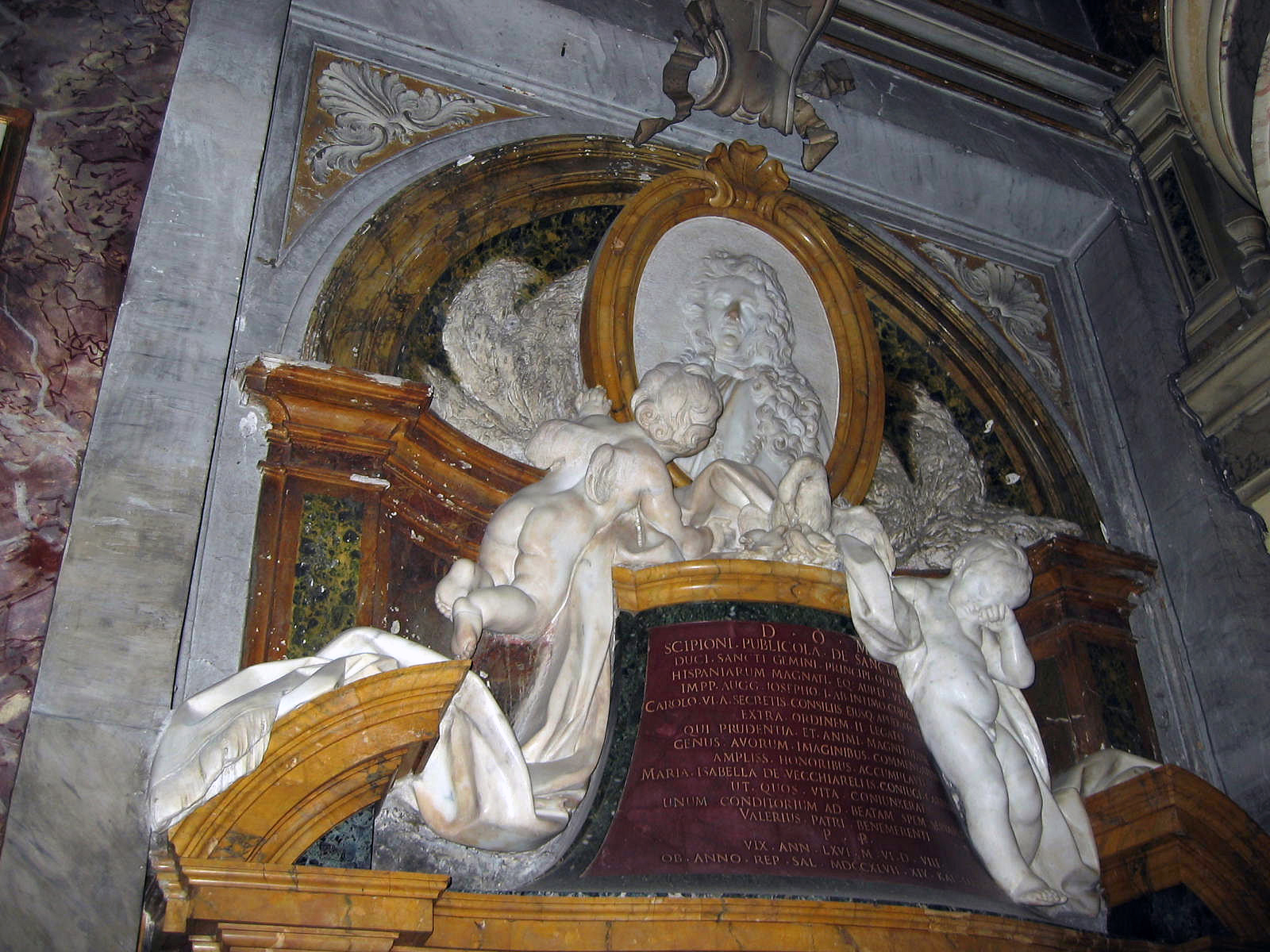
Monument to Scipione Publicola Santacroce (1749) by Maini located in Santa Maria in Publicolis, Rome.

Giovanni Battista Maini (6 February 1690 – 29 July 1752) was an Italian sculptor of the Late-Baroque period, active mainly in Rome.

== Biography ==
He was born in Cassano Magnago in Lombardy, and died in Rome. He may have had contacts with Foggini in Florence. By 1708, he had moved to Rome where he joined the large studio of Camillo Rusconi, where he worked for over twenty years. Among his first commission was the execution in bassorilievo (relief) of the Glory of San Francesco for a Jesuit church of Madrid; however, the bassorilievo in stucco, likely originally a design by Rusconi, was never sculpted in marble. Like Rusconi, Maini always modelled his projects in stucco first.

Maini collaborated in the decoration of the spandrels of the cupola of the Santi Luca e Martina. He worked in Sant'Agnese in Agone, where he executed the papal funerary monument to Innocent X (1729), likely based on Rusconi’s designs. For St. Peter’s Basilica, Maini carved large marble statues of St Francis of Paola (1732; designed by Pietro Bianchi) and St Philip Neri (c. 1735). This was part of a series of sculptures on the founders of orders and included Michelangelo Slodtz's St Bruno. He completed the Archangels Michael and Gabriel statues (c. 1737) for the basilica of Mafra, commissioned by king of Portugal.

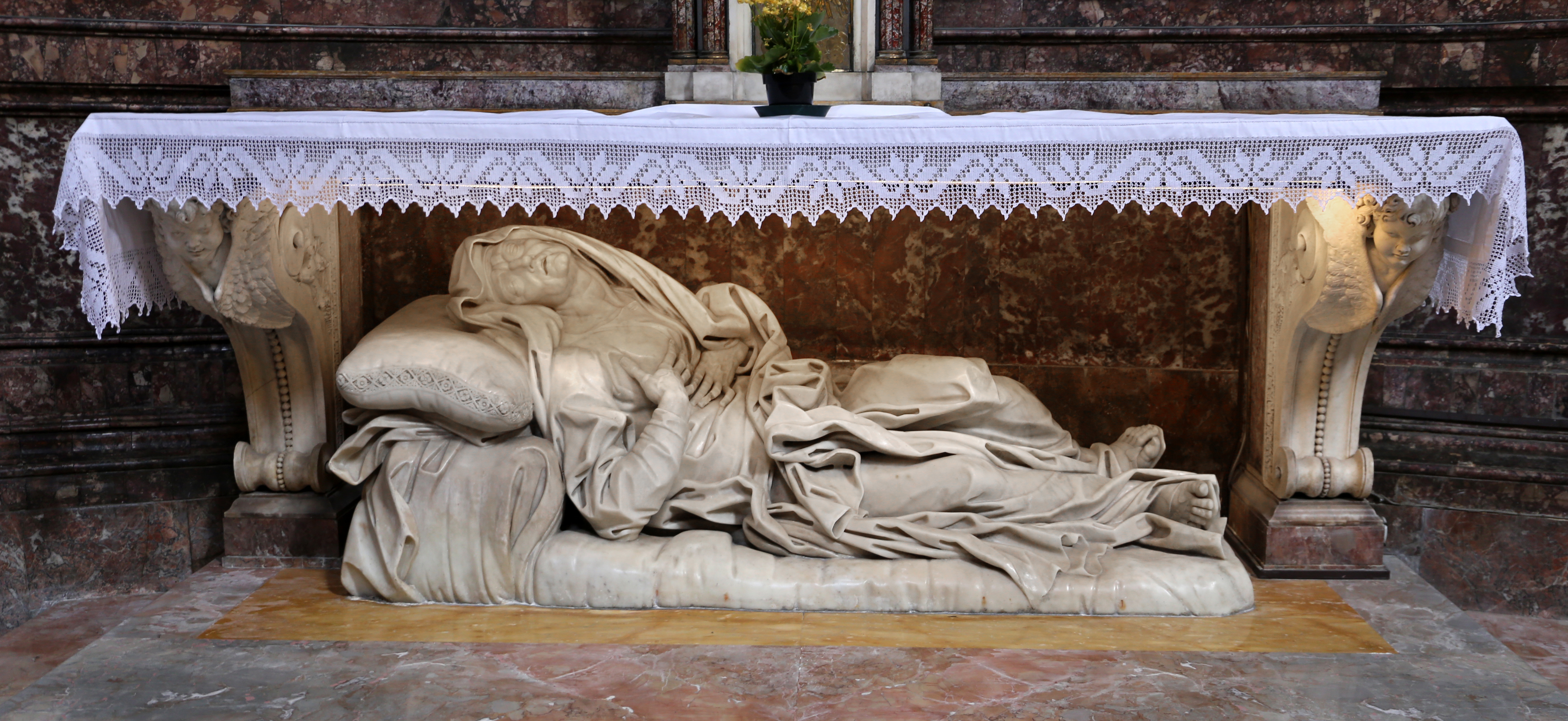
Maini's Saint Anne.

Between 1732 and 1735, Maini was involved in the prominent commissions by Clement XII for his family chapel, the Corsini chapel in San Giovanni in Laterano. The benedictory bronze statue of Clemente XII, by Maini, is inspired by Bernini’s Urban VIII in St. Peter’s, and replaced an earlier statue by Carlo Monaldi. He also sculpted figures for his monument to cardinal Neri Corsini" (1733–34), who was the pope’s nephew. In 1741–43, he worked on the portico relief of Madonna of St Luke for Santa Maria Maggiore. Another contemporary relief of St John Preaching was placed in San Giovanni in Laterano. Starting in 1734 Maini was involved in the design work of Fontana di Trevi, but failed to obtain the choice commission from the main architect Nicola Salvi for the final sculpting of the statue of Neptune and Oceanus group, which instead was given to Pietro Bracci (1743–59). He also sent some reliefs to Siena, for the Chigi chapel in the Cathedral of Siena.

In 1744 he was again working for the John V of Portugal, one of the greatest patrons of arts in the 18th century. He designed for the king a magnificent statue of the Immaculate Conception cast by Giuseppe Gagliardi. This huge silver-gilt image was nine palmi high. It was Blessed by Pope Benedict XIV himself in 1749 before being dispatched to Lisbon where it was destined to the Patriarchal Royal Chapel of the Ribeira Palace. It was for a few days the talk of Rome and was to be destroyed just a few years later by the 1755 Lisbon earthquake.

== Bibliography ==
- Montagu, Jennifer (2025). Giovanni Battista Maini (1690-1752) and Roman Sculpture of His Time. The Burlington Press. ISBN 978-1916237858.

== Sources ==
- Ormond, Flavia (2003). "Maini, Giovanni Battista". Grove Art Online. Oxford University Press. doi:10.1093/gao/9781884446054.article.T053248.
