= Manuel Pereira de Sampaio =

His Excellency Manuel Pereira de Sampaio CvC
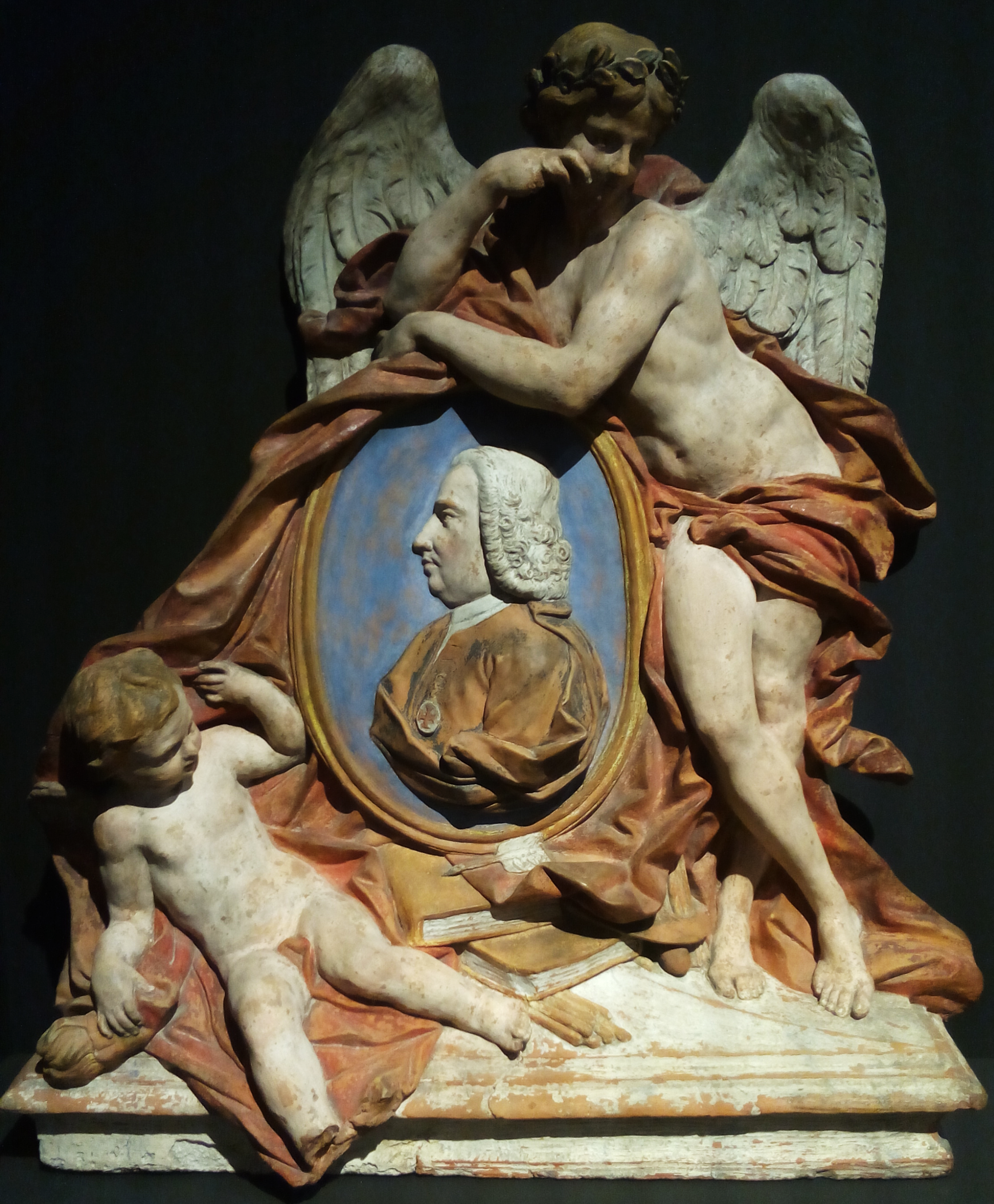
- Funerary monument to Manuel Pereira de Sampaio, designed by Filippo della Valle for Sant'Antonio dei Portoghesi (located in the Museu Nacional de Arte Antiga).

Portuguese Ambassador to the Holy See
- In office 1740–1750
- Monarch: John V of Portugal
- Preceded by: José Maria da Fonseca e Évora
- Succeeded by: António Cabral

Personal details
- Born: 1692 Lagos, Kingdom of the Algarve
- Died: February 1750 (aged 57–58) Civitavecchia, Papal States

Manuel Pereira de Sampaio (Lagos; 1692 - Rome; February 1750) was a Portuguese nobleman and diplomat, who served as King John V of Portugal's ambassador to the Holy See.

He is remembered notably for having secured the styling of Most Faithful Majesty for the Portuguese monarchy, in 1748, and for compiling what is now known as the Weale Album (Portuguese: Álbum Weale), an extensive catalog of artistic commissions by John V for Lisbon from Rome.

== Life ==
The exact details of his origins are unclear, it is known that Pereira de Sampaio was born in Lagos, in the Algarve, as a bastard of a minor Fidalgo of Portuguese nobility, Jacinto de Sampaio Vieira Lobos. He was Knight of the Order of Christ.

He was governor of the Church of Sant'Antonio dei Portoghesi, the Portuguese national church in Rome, and a prominent member of the artistic scene in Rome at the time. His position as governor, his personal reports on Pope Benedict XIV to King John V, and his close relationship with João Baptista Carbone, personal secretary of the Portuguese king, were all deciding factors in his nomination as ambassador to the papal court.

While ambassador, Pereira de Sampaio cataloged the numerous artistic commissions made by King John V in Rome, including artwork destined for Ribeira Palace and the famed Chapel of St. John the Baptist, destined for the Igreja de São Roque, in what is now known as the Weale Album.

On 15 September 1742, by consideration of services made at the court of Rome, Manuel Pereira de Sampaio, asked for a letter of confirmation of the commandery of Santo António, of the Order of Christ and of the presentation of the House of Bragança, by abandonment of Manuel Caetano Lopes.

On 9 March 1744 he received the mercy of Fidalgo of the Royal House with 16$000 réis per month of Fidalgo Cavaleiro and a alqueire of barley per day.

In 1748, Pereira de Sampaio achieved what is considered as the high point of his career, the granting of the style Most Faithful Majesty, by Pope Benedict XIV to King John V.

Pereira de Sampaio died in February 1750, in Civitavecchia, of an asthma attack, while preparing for an expedition back to Lisbon with works of art destined for the Patriarchal Basilica in Lisbon. He is buried in Sant'Antonio dei Portoghesi with a funerary monument dedicated to him designed by Filippo Della Valle.
