= Trevi Fountain =

Fountain in Rome, Italy

- Fountain
- Fontana di Trevi
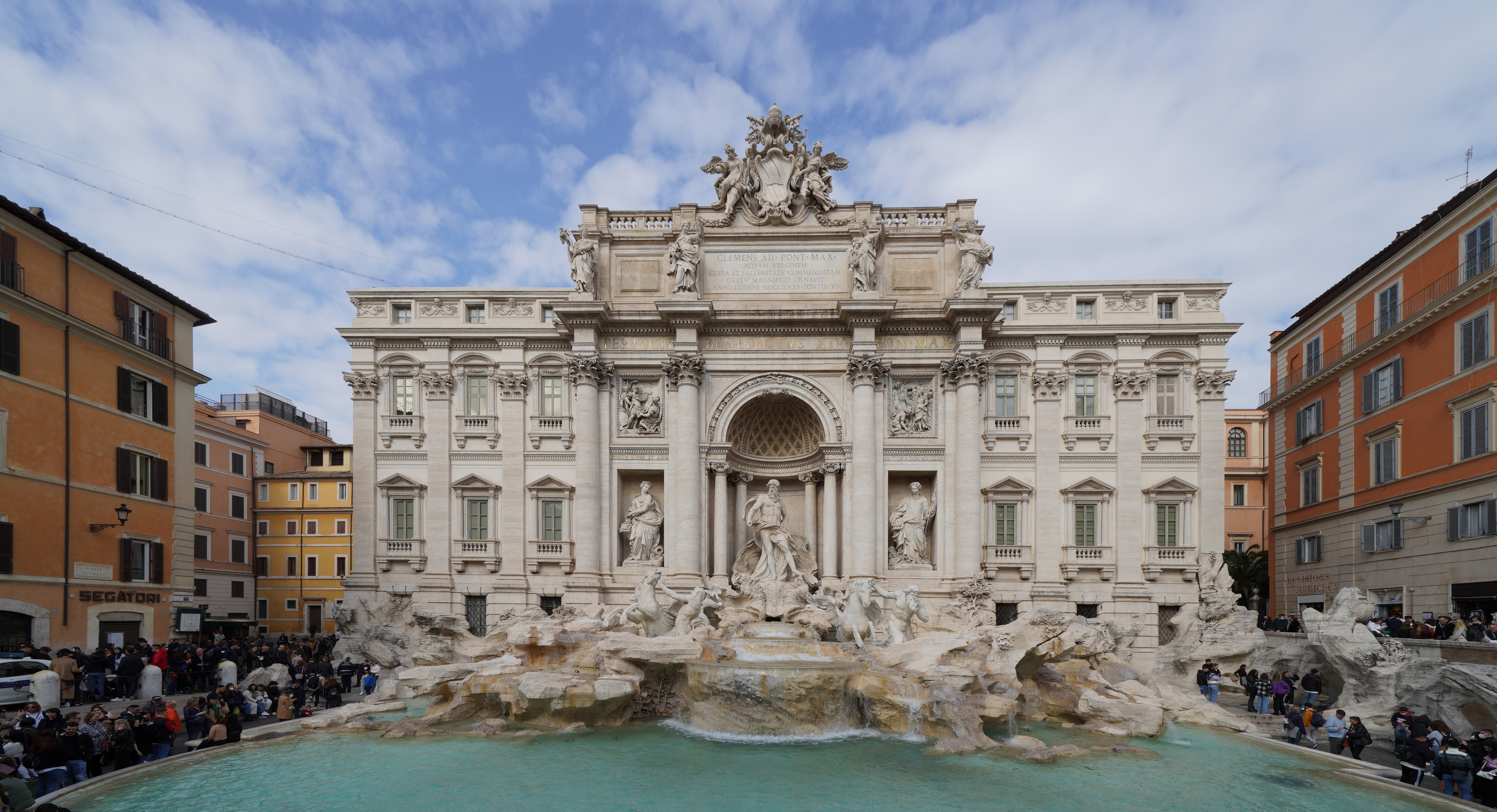
- Design: Nicola Salvi
- Constructed: 1732–1762; 264 years ago
- Height: 26.3 metres (86 ft)
- Length: 49 metres (161 ft)
- Surface: Travertine stone
- Location: Rome, Italy
- Interactive map of Trevi Fountain
- Coordinates: 41°54′3″N 12°28′59″E

The Trevi Fountain (Italian: Fontana di Trevi) is an 18th-century fountain in the Trevi district in Rome, Italy, designed by Italian architect Nicola Salvi and completed by Giuseppe Pannini in 1762. Standing 26.3 metres (86 ft) high and 49.15 metres (161.3 ft) wide, it is the largest Baroque fountain in the world and one of the most famous fountains in the world.

== History ==
=== Origins before 1629 ===
The fountain, at the junction of three roads (tre vie), marks the terminal point of the "modern" Acqua Vergine—the revived Aqua Virgo, one of the aqueducts that supplied water to ancient Rome. In 19 BC, supposedly with the help of a virgin, Roman technicians located a source of pure water some 13 km (8.1 mi) from the city. (This scene is presented on the present fountain's façade.) However, the eventual indirect route of the aqueduct made its length some 22 km (14 mi). This Aqua Virgo led the water into the Baths of Agrippa. It served Rome for more than 400 years.

During the 6th century AD, the aqueducts were not well maintained and the 14 functioning ones were damaged during the invasion of the Ostrogoths. Although compromised and greatly reduced in scope after the damage caused by the siege of the Goths of Vitiges in 537, the Acqua Vergine remained in use throughout the Middle Ages, with restorations attested as early as the 8th century, then again by the Municipality in the 12th century, on the occasion of which the conduit was also connected to other sources closer to the city, located in a place then called "Trebium".

The Acqua Vergine water aqueduct carries the water to the Trevi Fountain, after having collected it 10 km (6.2 mi) from the Italian capital. The aqueduct is still in use today, despite some interventions during which the fountain remained empty. Calcium-free water is thought to be one of the causes.

=== Commission, construction, and design ===
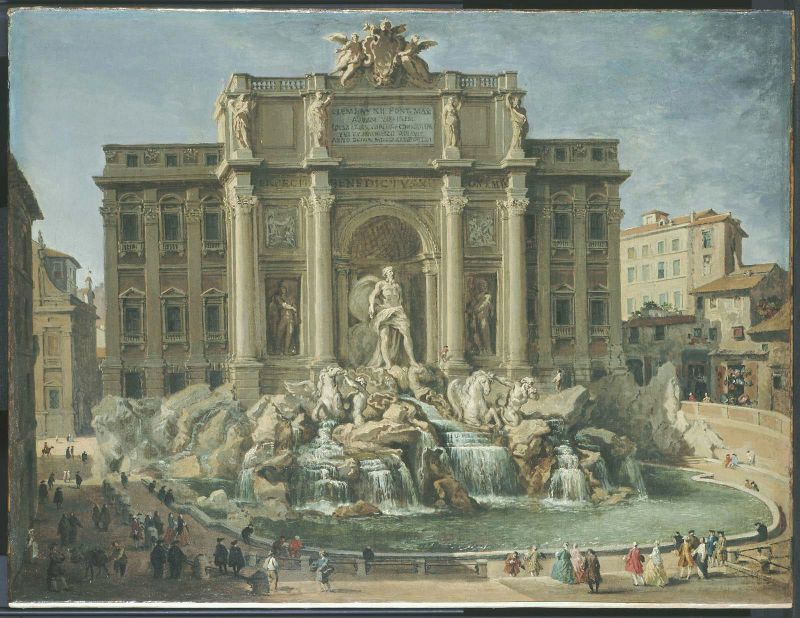
Trevi Fountain in the 18th century, painted by G. P. Panini

In 1629, Pope Urban VIII, finding the earlier fountain insufficiently dramatic, asked Gian Lorenzo Bernini to sketch possible renovations, but the project was abandoned when the Pope died. Though Bernini's project was never constructed, there are many Bernini touches in the fountain as it exists today. An early influential model by Pietro da Cortona, preserved in the Albertina, Vienna, also exists, as do various early 18th century sketches, most unsigned, as well as a project attributed to Nicola Michetti one attributed to Ferdinando Fuga and a French design by Edmé Bouchardon.

Competitions had become popular during the Baroque era to design buildings, fountains, as well as the Spanish Steps. In 1730, Pope Clement XII organized a contest in which Nicola Salvi initially lost to Alessandro Galilei – but due to the outcry in Rome over a Florentine having won, Salvi was awarded the commission anyway. Work began in 1732.

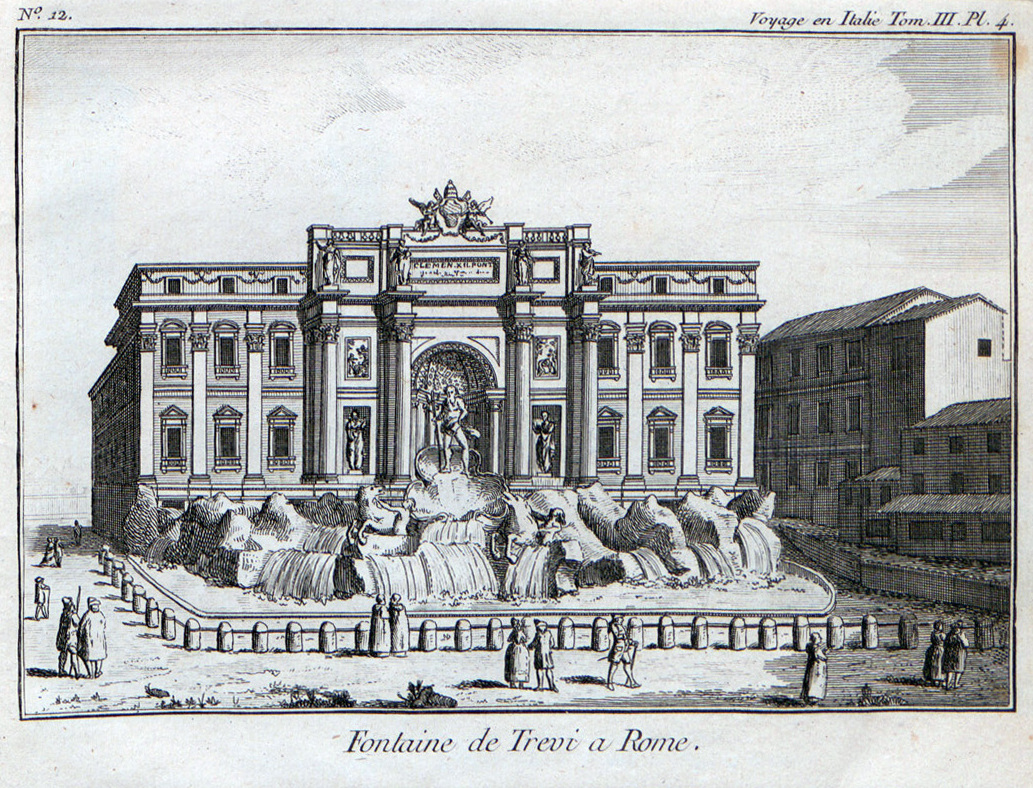
The fountain in Journey of a Frenchman in Italy (1769) by J. Lalande

When Salvi designed the fountain, a palace (now the Palazzo Poli) was on the site so he incorporated the fountain into the rear of the building.

Salvi died in 1751 with his work half finished, but he had made sure a barber's unsightly sign would not spoil the ensemble, hiding it behind a sculpted vase, called by Romans the asso di coppe, the "Ace of Cups", because of its resemblance to a Tarot card. Four different sculptors were hired to complete the fountain's decorations: Pietro Bracci (whose statue of Oceanus sits in the central niche), Filippo della Valle, Giovanni Grossi, and Andrea Bergondi. Giuseppe Pannini (1718-1805), son of Giovanni Paolo Panini, was hired as architect.

The Trevi Fountain was finished in 1762 by Pannini, who substituted the present allegories for planned sculptures of Agrippa and Trivia, the Roman virgin. It was officially opened and inaugurated on 22 May by Pope Clement XIII. The majority of the piece is made from Travertine stone, quarried near Tivoli, about 35 kilometres (22 miles) east of Rome.

The name of the fountain derives from the Latin word trivium, meaning "intersection of three streets". The statue is located right in the center of Via De' Crocicchi, Via Poli and Via Delle Muratte.

=== Restorations ===
The fountain was refurbished once in 1988 to remove discoloration caused by smog, and again in 1998; the stonework was scrubbed and all cracks and other areas of deterioration were repaired by skilled artisans, and the fountain was equipped with recirculating pumps. In January 2013, it was announced that the Italian fashion company Fendi would sponsor a 20-month, 2.2-million-euro restoration of the fountain, the most thorough in the fountain's history. Restoration work began in June 2014 and was completed in November 2015. The fountain was reopened with an official ceremony on the evening of 3 November 2015. The restoration included the installation of more than 100 LED lights to improve the nighttime illumination of the fountain.

=== 2023 protest ===
On 21 May 2023, activists of the climate group Ultima Generazione (Last Generation) climate protest group vandalized the fountain by dyeing the water with charcoal. Rome Mayor Roberto Gualtieri criticized the attacks on heritage sites. As the fountain recirculates the water, cleaning of the fountain would need the 300,000 litres of polluted water to be emptied and replaced resulting in significant costs. Ryan Maue, the former chief scientist for the National Oceanic and Atmospheric Administration, stated the attack was done by "climate eco-anarchists".

=== Ticketing System ===
On 2 February 2026, the City Council of Rome introduced a ticketing system where non-residents will need to buy a 2-euro ticket to approach the fountain and throw coins into its waters. This is part of its latest effort to manage crowds at one of the capital’s most overwhelmed landmarks. Tickets are required from 11 a.m. to 10 p.m. on Mondays and Fridays, and from 9 a.m. to 10 p.m. the rest of the week. After 10 p.m., the barriers are opened and access is free for all.

As stated by Rome's city councillor responsible for tourism Alessandro Onorato, the city hall estimates that the ticketing system in place has the potential to earn over six million euros in revenue a year. These funds would, apart from fund restoration, also pay for around 25 stewards hired within the ticketing office and also to usher people through the restricted area reserved for ticket holders. The funds raised would also permit free access for locals to a series of museums across the Italian capital, Onorato also said.

== Iconography ==
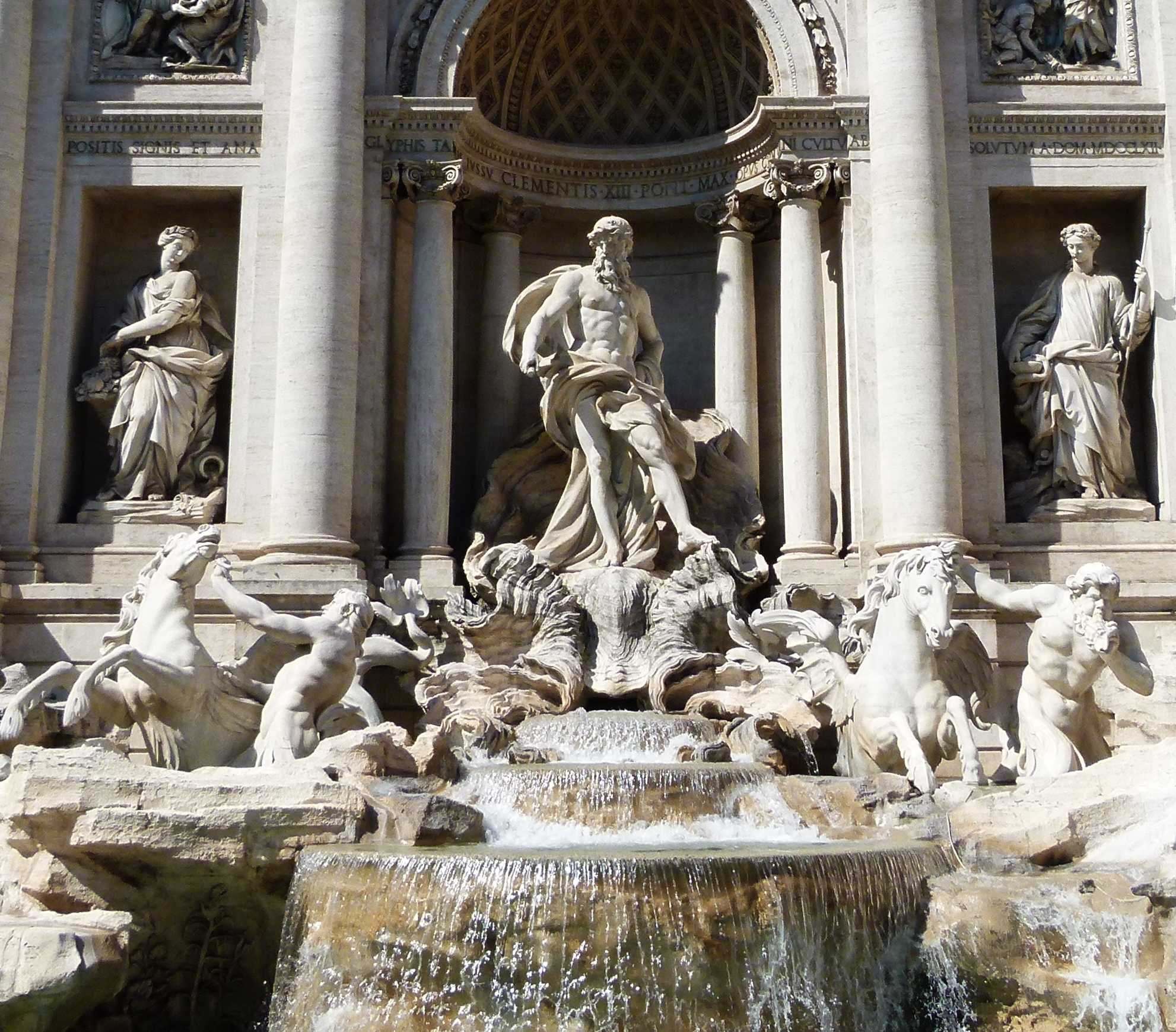
The titan Oceanus springs from the central niche on a shell chariot pulled by two hippocamps and two cascading tritons.

The backdrop for the fountain is the Palazzo Poli, given a new façade with a giant order of Corinthian pilasters that link the two main storeys. Taming of the waters is the theme of the gigantic scheme that tumbles forward, mixing water and rockwork, and filling the small square. Tritons guide Oceanus's shell chariot, taming hippocamps.

In the centre, a robustly-modelled triumphal arch is superimposed on the palazzo façade. The centre niche or exedra framing Oceanus has free-standing columns for maximal light and shade. In the niches flanking Oceanus, Abundance spills water from her urn and Salubrity holds a cup from which a snake drinks. Above, bas reliefs illustrate the Roman origin of the aqueducts.

The Tritons and horses provide symmetrical balance, with the maximum contrast in their mood and poses (by 1730, Rococo was already in full bloom in France and Germany).

== Coin throwing ==
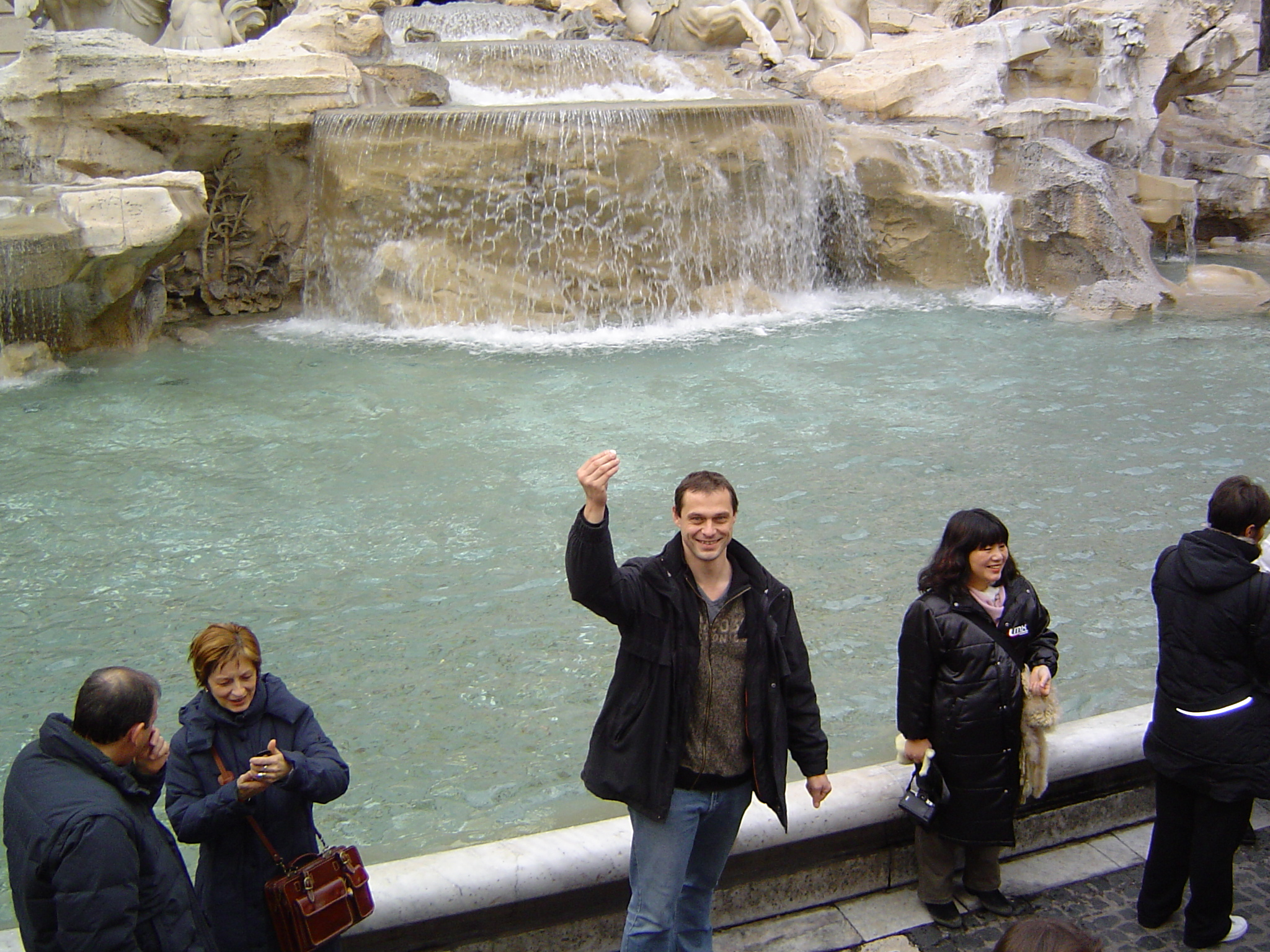
Man about to throw a coin into the fountain

The best known and most persistent tradition consists of throwing a coin into the fountain before leaving "the eternal city", a superstition associated with the fountain being that whoever makes this gesture would favor a future return to the city. Coins are purportedly meant to be thrown while turning one's back to the fountain, using the right hand over the left shoulder. This was the theme of 1954's Three Coins in the Fountain and the Academy Award-winning song by that name which introduced the picture.

An estimated 3,000 euros are thrown into the fountain each day. In 2016, an estimated €1.4 million (US$1.5 million) was thrown into the fountain. The money thrown into the fountain is donated to the Caritas association, which uses it for charity work; however, there are regular attempts to steal coins from the fountain, although it is illegal to do so.

Due to the popularity of the fountain drawing in large crowds, Rome officials are considering options for limiting access to the fountain for tourists, such as accepting reservations. A platform will be built around the fountain's lower basin, accessible to a limited number of visitors. A queuing system was finally implemented following the fountain's reopening in December 2024, which came after a three-month restoration period. A maximum cap of 400 visitors was imposed.

== In popular culture ==
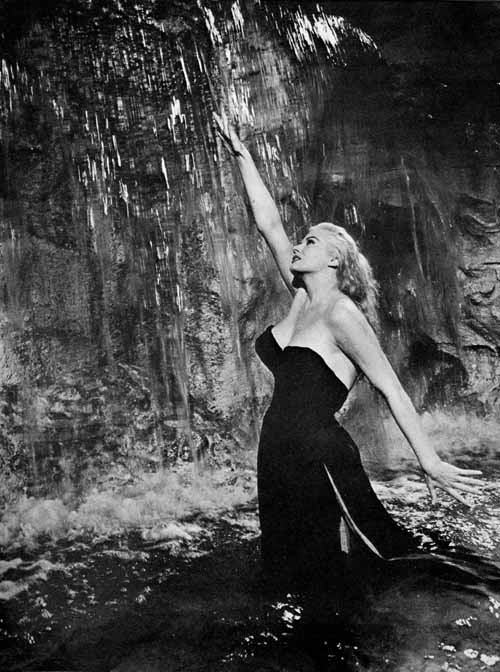
Anita Ekberg wading in the fountain in the film La Dolce Vita (1960)

The Trevi Fountain is depicted in the third movement, "The Trevi Fountain at Noon", of Ottorino Respighi's 1916 symphonic poem Fountains of Rome.

The fountain has appeared in several films, including Roman Holiday (1953); Three Coins in the Fountain (1954); Federico Fellini's classic, La Dolce Vita (1960); Sabrina Goes to Rome (1998); and The Lizzie McGuire Movie (2003). In Federico Fellini's 1960 film La Dolce Vita, Anita Ekberg wades into the fountain with Marcello Mastroianni.

In 1973, the Italian national postal service dedicated a postage stamp to the Trevi Fountain.

Lego has released two sets based on the Trevi Fountain: one on 1 June 2014, and another on 1 March 2025.

== Replicas ==
An 11-metre-high (36 ft) and 20.6-metre-wide (68 ft) similar façade construction as monument was built in 2023 at Serra Negra, Brazil. Another copy is located near Caesars Palace in Las Vegas.

== Gallery ==
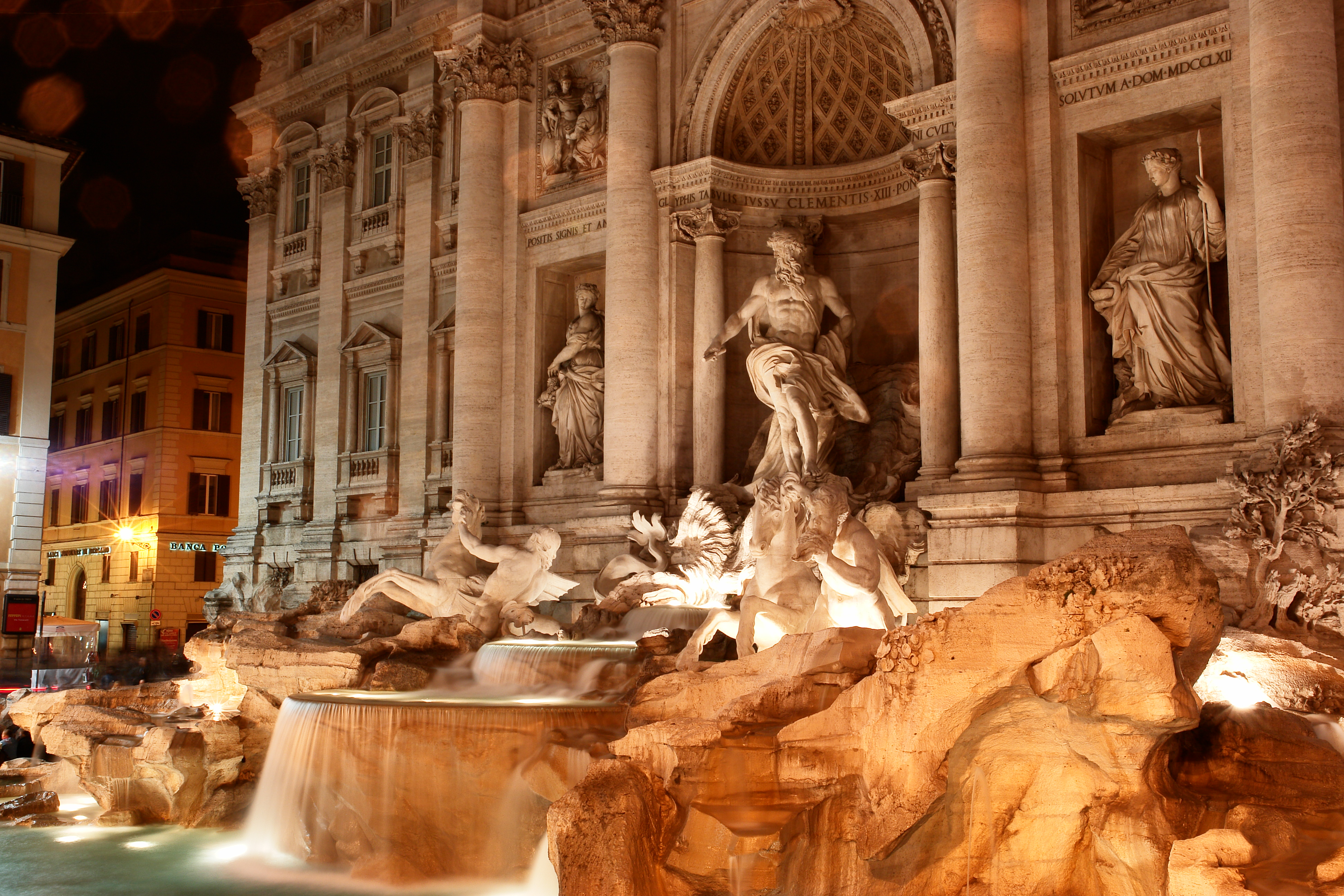
Sculptures at night

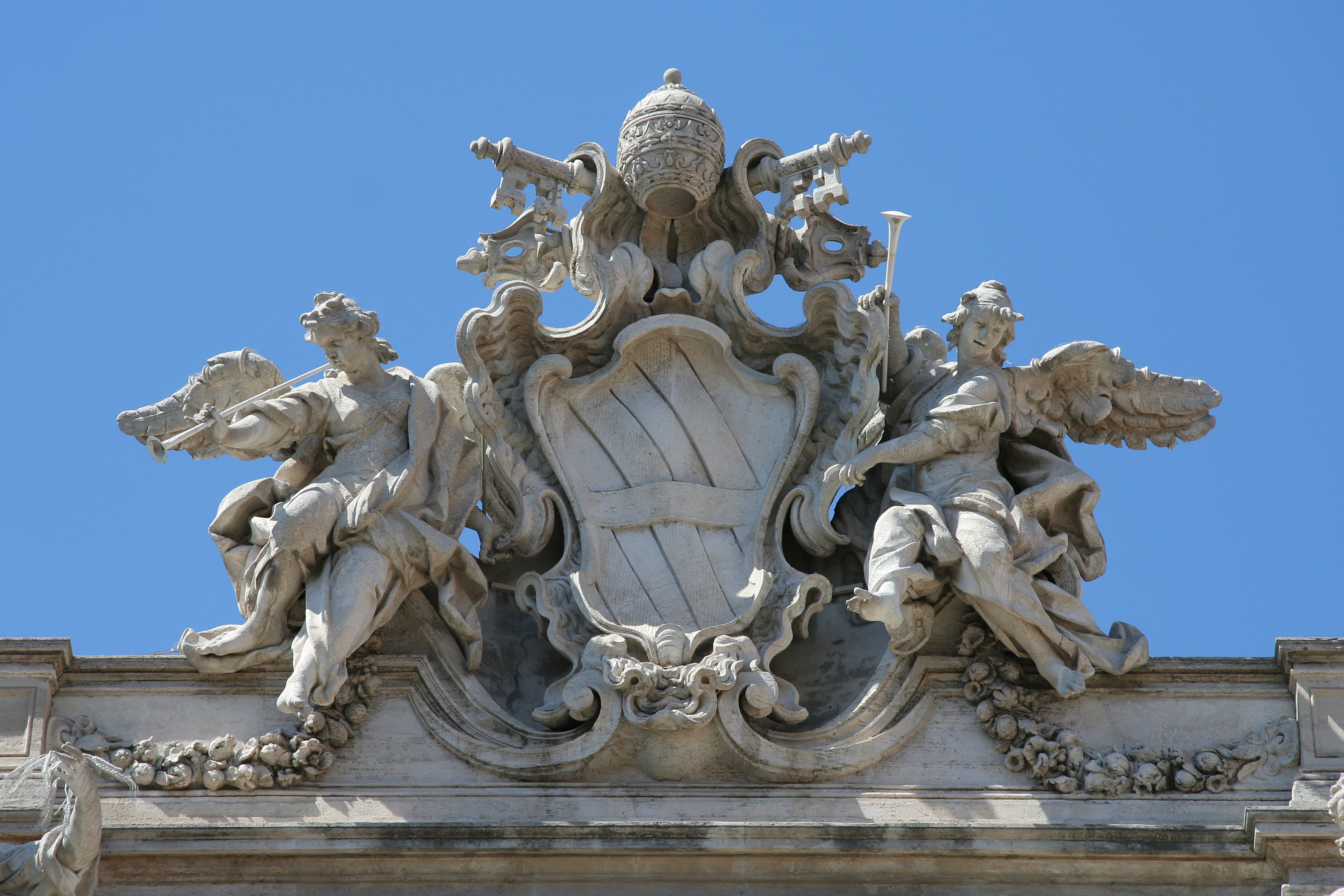
Papal coat of arms

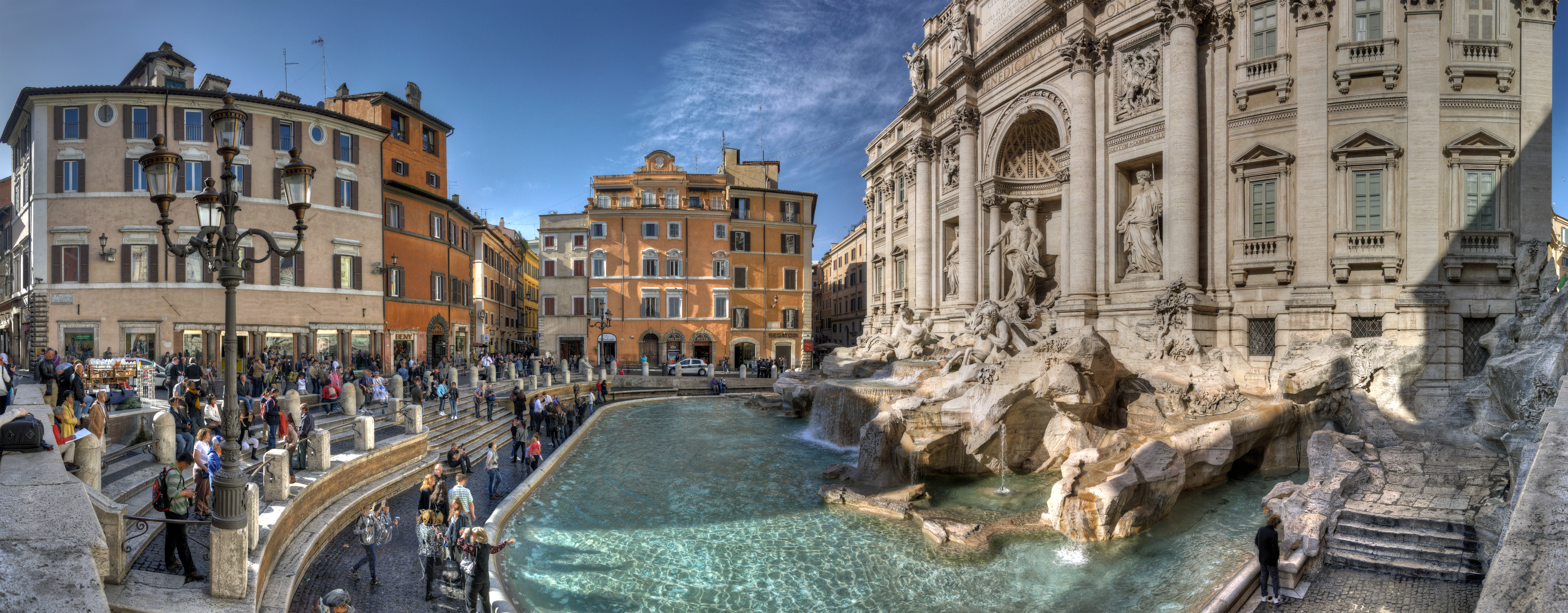
Trevi Fountain as viewed from the right side

== See also ==
- List of fountains in Rome
- List of tourist attractions in Rome

Preceded by Fontana delle Tartarughe	Landmarks of Rome; Trevi Fountain	Succeeded by Fountain of the Tritons
