= Pietro Bracci =

Italian sculptor (1700–1773)

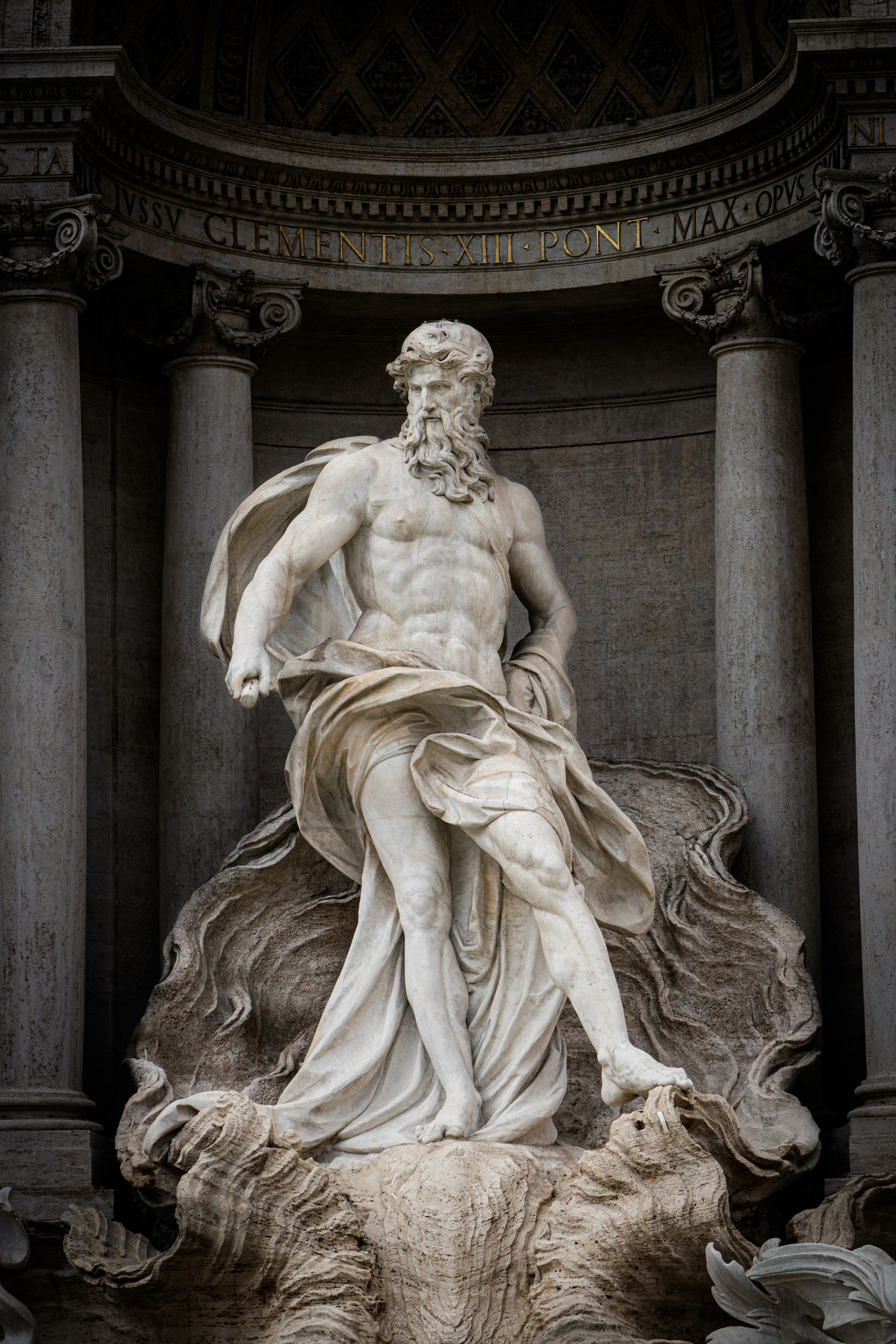
Oceanus (or Neptune) of the Trevi Fountain

Pietro Bracci (June 16, 1700–1773) was an Italian sculptor working in the Late Baroque manner. He is best known for carving the marble sculpture of Oceanus at the center of Rome's Trevi Fountain, based on a plaster modello by Giovanni Battista Maini.

== Biography ==
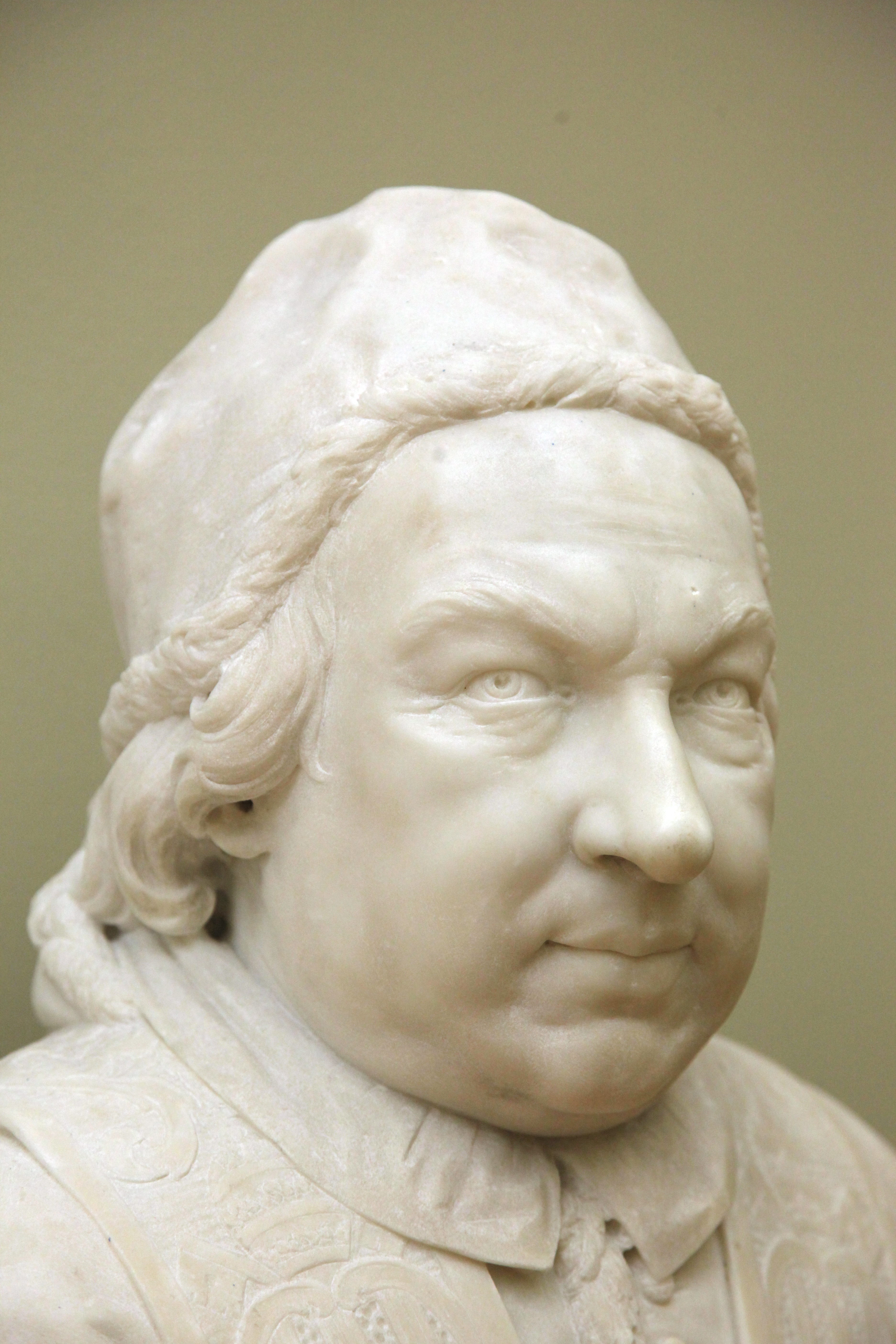
Pope Benedict XIV Museum of Grenoble.

He was born in Rome and became a student of Giuseppe Bartolomeo Chiari and Camillo Rusconi. His most familiar works are the colossal Oceanus or Neptune of the Trevi Fountain, Rome, after a modello by Giovanni Battista Maini, and four prominent tomb monuments in Rome.

He sculpted the figures for the tomb of Benedict XIII (1734) in Santa Maria sopra Minerva, Rome, which was designed by the architect Carlo Marchionni, and for the tomb of Benedict XIV (1763–1770) in the Basilica of Saint Peter, completed with the help of his pupil Gaspare Sibilia. The third tomb at St Peter's on which he worked commemorates Maria Clementina Sobieski (1742), wife of the "Old Pretender", James Stuart, one of the Catholic Stuart claimants to the thrones of England, Scotland and Ireland. It is one of three monuments in St. Peter's dedicated to the deposed royal line of Stuart. The sculpture is in polychrome with an image of Maria Clementina in mosaic held aloft by Charity. The monument was conceived by the architect Filippo Barigioni, who provided preliminary sketches. Bracci also designed and sculpted the polychromatic tomb of Cardinal Giuseppe Renato Imperiali (1741) in Sant'Agostino in Rome.

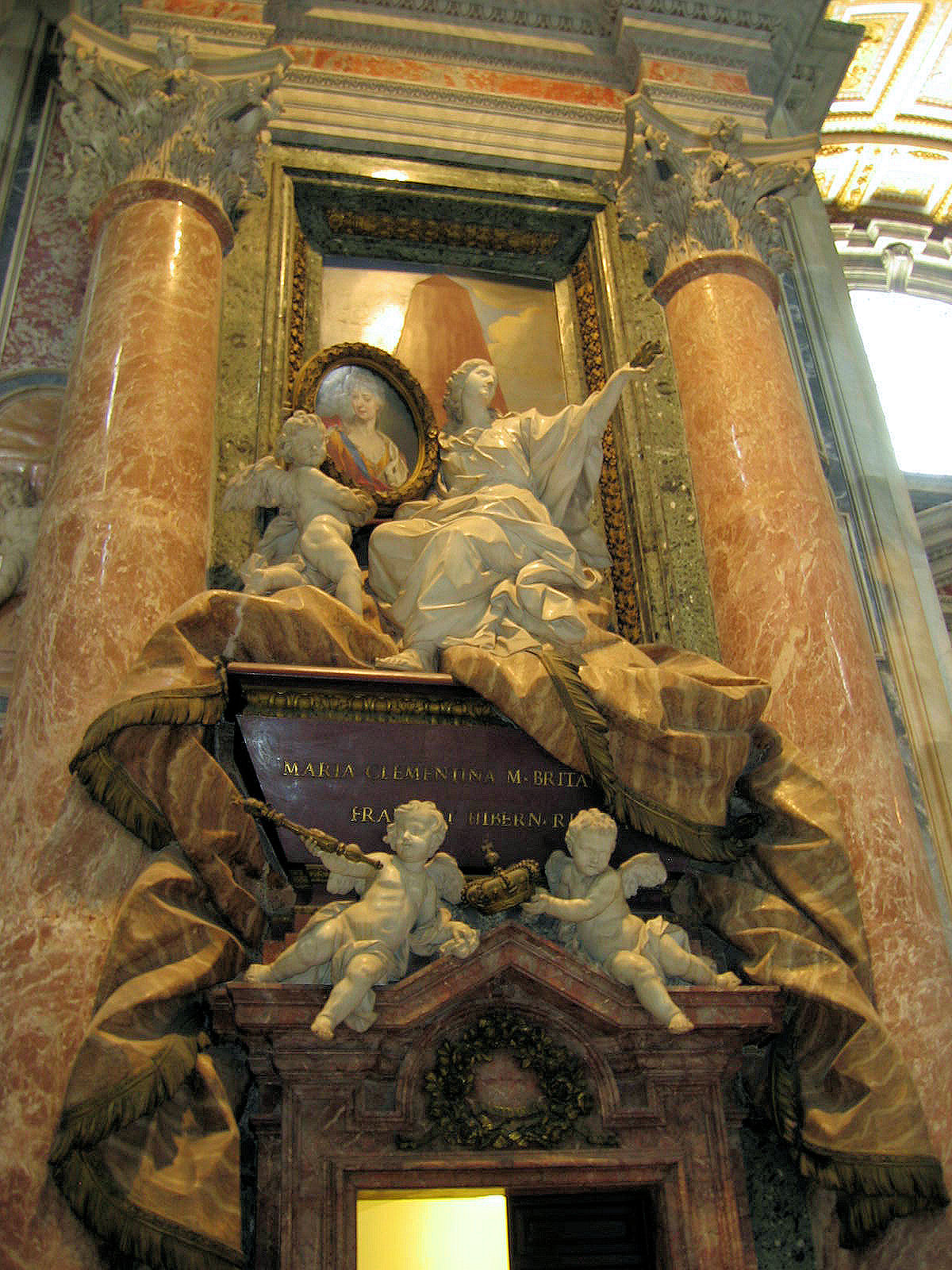
The Sobieski tomb

His best known work is the colossal Oceanus— also known as Neptune — (after 1759) of the Trevi Fountain, Rome, where he was constrained to follow a plaster modello by Giovanni Battista Maini, who died before he could execute the marble. Bracci executed the Oceanus and the tritons when he took over work on the fountain. After the death of Nicola Salvi (1751) work was halted with only the foundations built. A few years later the works were assigned to Panini who was stopped when he started to make changes to the project. Bracci took over in 1761 and finished the fountain in 1763. Nicola Salvi and Pietro Bracci were longtime friends, both being members of Arcadia and members of the confraternity of the virtuosi at the Pantheon.

There are several official busts of Benedict XIII by Bracci, and a terracotta (1724), conserved in Palazzo Venezia, Rome. The aged glare of the pope in the marble portrait was an image difficult to beautify.

Like all sculptors in Rome since the 16th century, Bracci was often called upon to restore or complete Roman sculptures, such as the Capitoline Antinous, to render them suitable for display.

Bracci had a wide range of interests as known from his manuscripts, most of them are today lost. These interests included architecture, military engineering, sundials but also Ancient Egyptian hieroglyphs.

Bracci died in Rome in 1773. His son was the architect Virginio Bracci, whose daughter was the pastellist Faustina Bracci Armellini.

== Literature and further reading ==
- Web Gallery of Art: Pietro Bracci
- Bruce Boucher (1998). Italian Baroque Sculpture. Thames & Hudson, World of Art. p. 126.
- Elisabeth Kieven and John Pinto (2001). Pietro Bracci and Eighteenth-Century Rome: Drawings for Architecture and Sculpture in the Canadian Centre for Architecture and Other Collections. p. 126.
- Kieven, Elisabeth and John Pinto., Architecture and Sculpture in Eighteenth-Century Rome: Drawings by Pietro and Virginio Bracci in the CCA and Other Collections, Penn State Press, 2001 ISBN 0-271-02008-3
- Drawings by Pietro Bracci, Canadian Centre for Architecture.
