= Camillo Rusconi =

Italian sculptor (1658–1728)

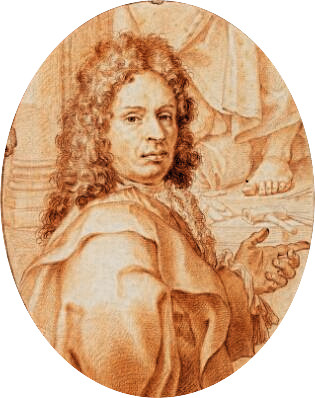
- Portrait of Camillo Rusconi by Domenico Maria Sani
- Born: 14 July 1658; Milan, Duchy of Milan
- Died: 8 December 1728 (aged 70); Rome, Papal States
- Known for: Sculpture
- Movement: Late-Baroque; Neoclassicism

Camillo Rusconi (14 July 1658 – 8 December 1728) was an Italian sculptor of the late Baroque in Rome. His style displays both features of Baroque and Neoclassicism. He has been described as a Carlo Maratta in marble.

== Biography ==
=== Early life and education ===
Rusconi's career began in the late Baroque period and continued into the early Rococo or Barocchetto (as it came to be known for Italian art). There are elements of both periods in his style, yet he favoured the earlier, more dynamic and universalizing way of expressing artistic ideas. Rusconi’s career followed a traditional and successful pattern.

He was schooled in Milan by the Jesuits, and at the age of 15 he went to study with Giuseppe Rusnati, a Milanese sculptor who had been part of Ercole Ferrata’s workshop in Rome. Rusconi had therefore felt the influence of Roman High Baroque sculpture before he went to Rome to work with his master’s master at the age of 28. Ferrata unfortunately died shortly afterwards, in 1686.

Rusconi inherited from his masters the styles of Algardi and Bernini, the two most influential Roman sculptors of the previous generation. In particular he was influenced by Bernini’s copious forms and expansive gestures: although he did not tap the expressive energies of the Baroque in the same way as Bernini, the grand manner, revealing powerful human passions and depicting virtuous actions, remained prominent in his work. The most important influence on Rusconi was, however, that of the painter Carlo Maratta, who dismissed many of the more extreme conventions of Baroque composition in favour of ordered grouping and clear presentation of individual figures and narrative; his manner became the court style that dominated late Baroque art in Europe.

=== Early career ===
Rusconi's talent attracted commission. Among his first independent works are four plaster allegorical statues depicting four virtues (prudence, justice, temperance, and strength) for the Ludovisi Chapel in Sant'Ignazio, Rome. He was also active in modelling and sculpting angels and putti for various other churches in Rome: there are putti at Santi Vito e Modesto (stucco, c. 1686–7) and San Salvatore in Lauro (stucco, c. 1687–8); more putti, and four angels holding a wreath, at San Silvestro in Capite (stucco, 1690); angels and putti at Santa Maria dell'Orto and two beautiful marble angels in the chapel of Sant'Ignazio in the Church of the Gesù (1696–9).

Rusconi is known to have made small-scale works for private collectors, including a silver Crucifix and a silver statuette of St. Sebastian for the Marchese Niccolò Pallavicini.

=== Mature work ===
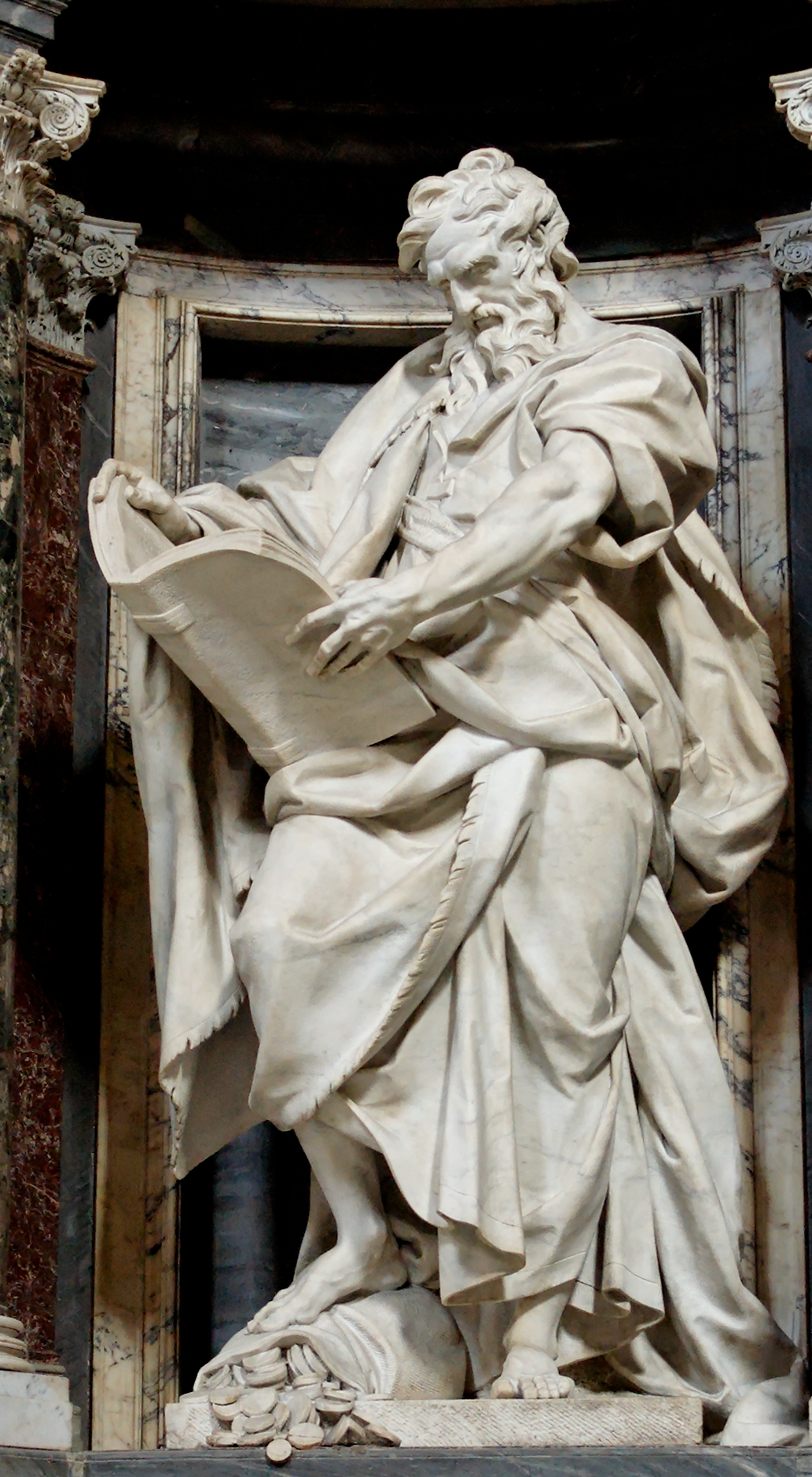
St. Matthew by Camillo Rusconi. Nave of the Basilica of St. John Lateran

Rusconi’s masterpieces are the four over life-size marble statues that he contributed to the series of twelve Apostles designed by Maratti to fill Francesco Borromini’s niches in the nave of the Archbasilica of Saint John Lateran, Rome. Following Maratta’s drawings, but making the necessary translation of a painter’s ideas into sculptural terms, he sculpted St. Andrew (1708–9), St. John (1709–12), St. Matthew (1715) and St. James the Greater (1715–18). The St. Matthew, in particular, demonstrates the power, authority and presence associated with the Renaissance and Baroque tradition; reading his Gospel, Matthew has a Michelangelesque sense of heroic presence. The emphatic contrapposto of the figure, who has one foot on his money-bag (from his tax collecting days), is taken up in the open patterning to be found throughout the rest of the work. The deep-set eyes and mouth, broadly combed hair and flamelike beard give the head the appearance of divinity, and the dignity of bearing is emphasized by the chiaroscuro patterns. The classical restraint of the figures was to set a trend toward neoclassicism.

Memorials to famous men, a typical 18th-century art form, also occupied Rusconi’s energies. His marble monuments to Giuseppe Paravicini (after 1695; Rome, S Francesco a Ripa) and to Raffaello Fabretti (c. 1700; Rome, Santa Maria sopra Minerva) both consist of portrait busts of the deceased set into oval wall niches and accompanied by putti bearing coats of arms or draperies with inscriptions. The much simpler memorial to Giuseppe Eusanio (marble; Rome, Sant'Agostino) has a circular, three-quarter profile portrait medallion. That to Prince Alexander Sobieski (marble, 1727–8; Rome, Santa Maria della Concezione) is a high relief wall tomb with two mourning putti on a sarcophagus, above which is an oval profile medallion of Sobieski.

Rusconi’s most famous funerary work is the monument to Gregory XIII (marble, 1715–23; Rome, St Peter’s), which consists of a seated statue of the Pope, hand extended in blessing, raised on a sarcophagus flanked by female allegorical statues of Fortitude and Religion. Gregory's calendar reform is referred to in the relief on the sarcophagus. Unlike the other papal tombs in the basilica the placement of the group, partly within a niche hollowed from an aisle pier and partly in front of it, makes it relatively accessible to the viewer. The pyramidal arrangement of figures and tomb, open gestures and broad drapery patterns express Baroque principles of composition; but the oblique line of sight from which the whole must be approached and the closeness of the figures to the spectator create a relative sense of intimacy more typical of the Barocchetto. Also, Fortitude pushes back some drapery in a gesture of curiosity; she wants to see the story of Gregory’s reform. This break with her normal allegorical function reflects the more casual, less heroic and more personal art of the 18th century.

=== Later life ===
In 1707, relatively late in life, Rusconi was admitted to the Accademia di San Luca, Rome. His reception piece, a group of the Rape of Persephone, seems to have been based on Bernini’s interpretation of the same subject (Rome, Galleria Borghese). In 1718 Pope Clement XI awarded him the cross of a Knight of the Order of Christ of the King of Portugal, and the following year he was given the benefices of Pio and Lauretano. He was elected Principe of the Accademia in 1727 and the following year, probably against his wishes, confirmed in the post for life.

Among Rusconi’s many pupils were Pietro Bracci, Giovanni Battista Maini, and Filippo della Valle, who continued his tradition in a more relaxed and less ambitious style. Rusconi was buried at Santa Maria della Concezione, Rome, after a magnificent funeral.

== Gallery ==
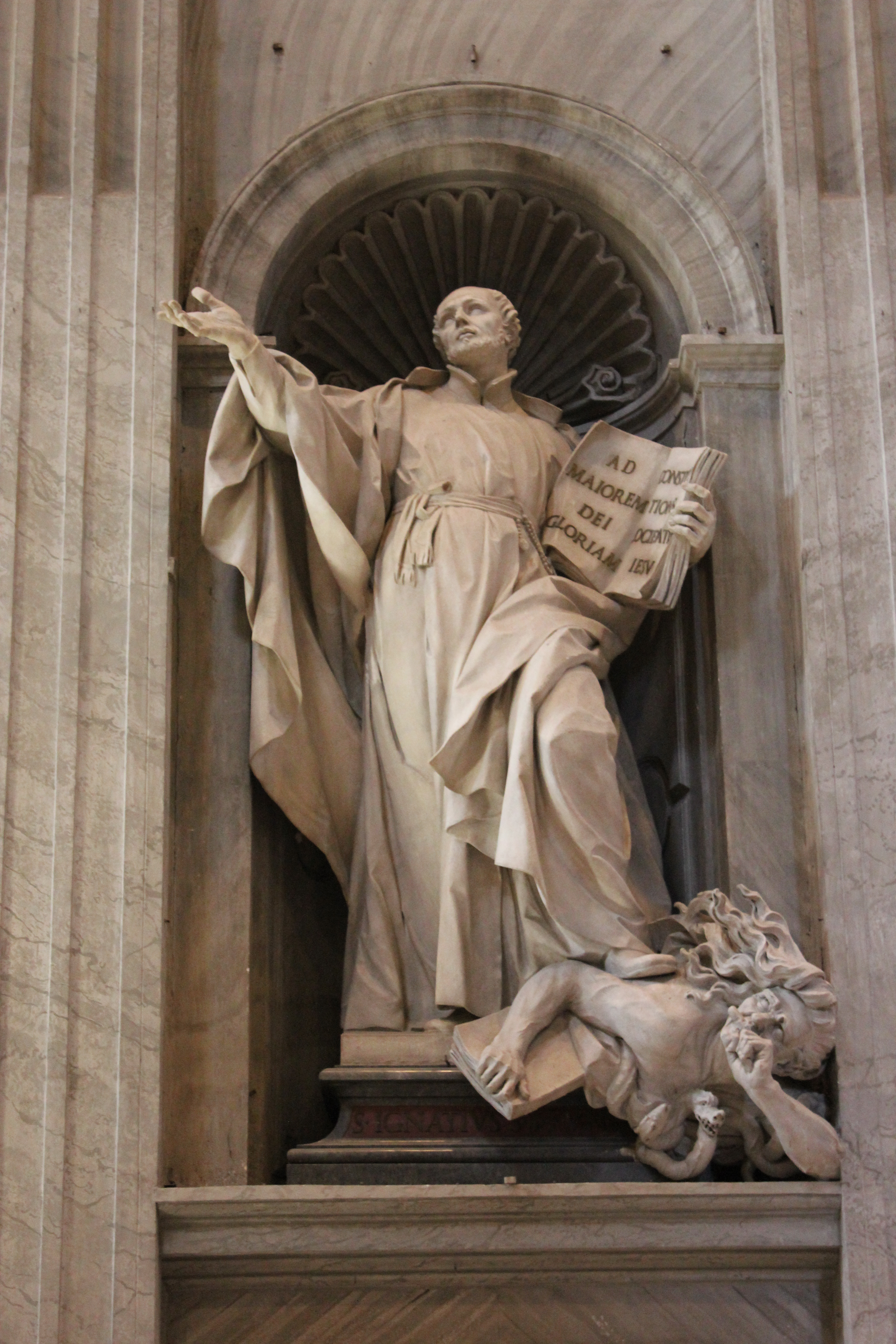
Ignatius of Loyola in St. Peters Basilica

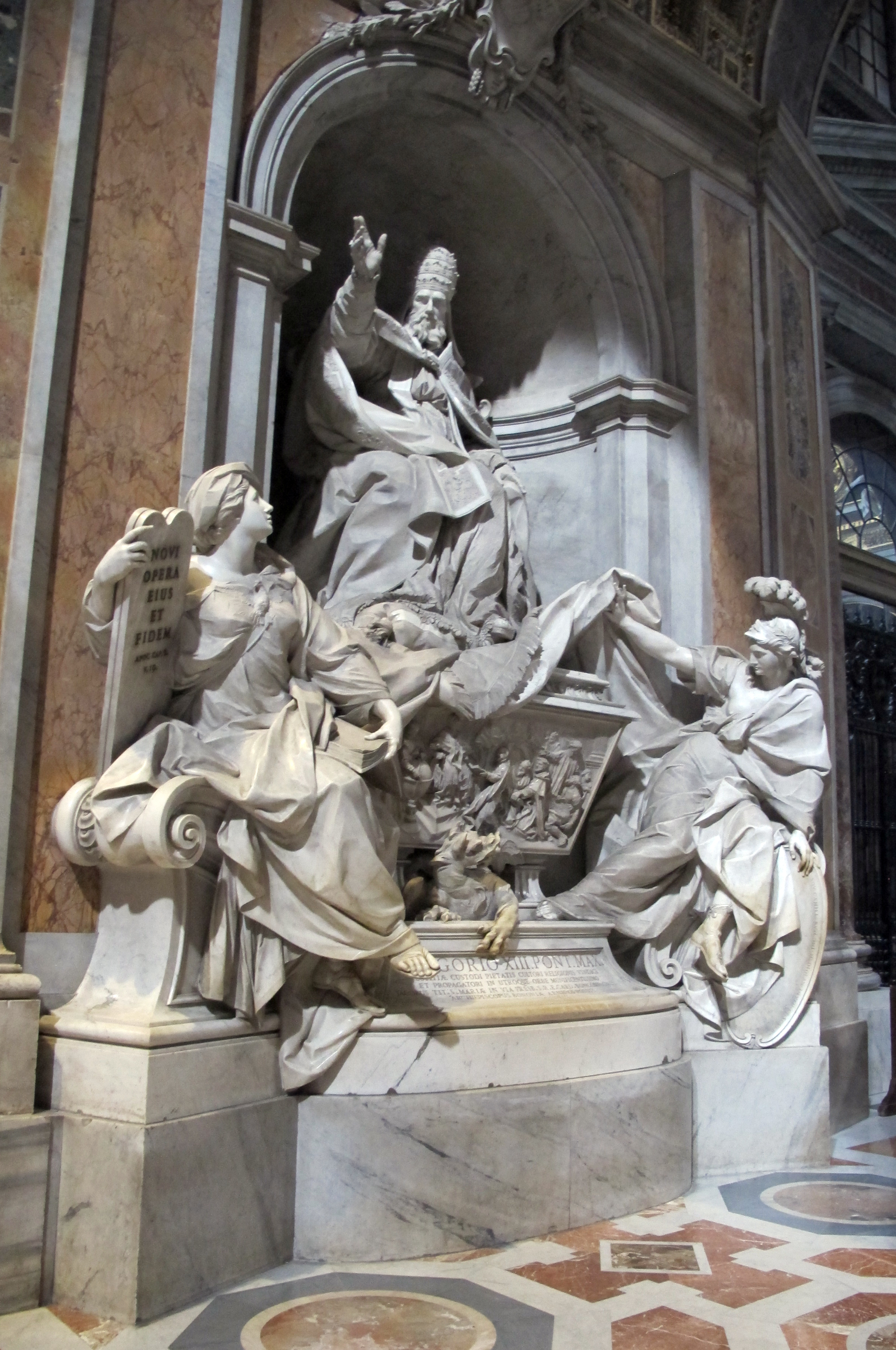
Tomb of Pope Gregory XIII, Rome, St. Peter's

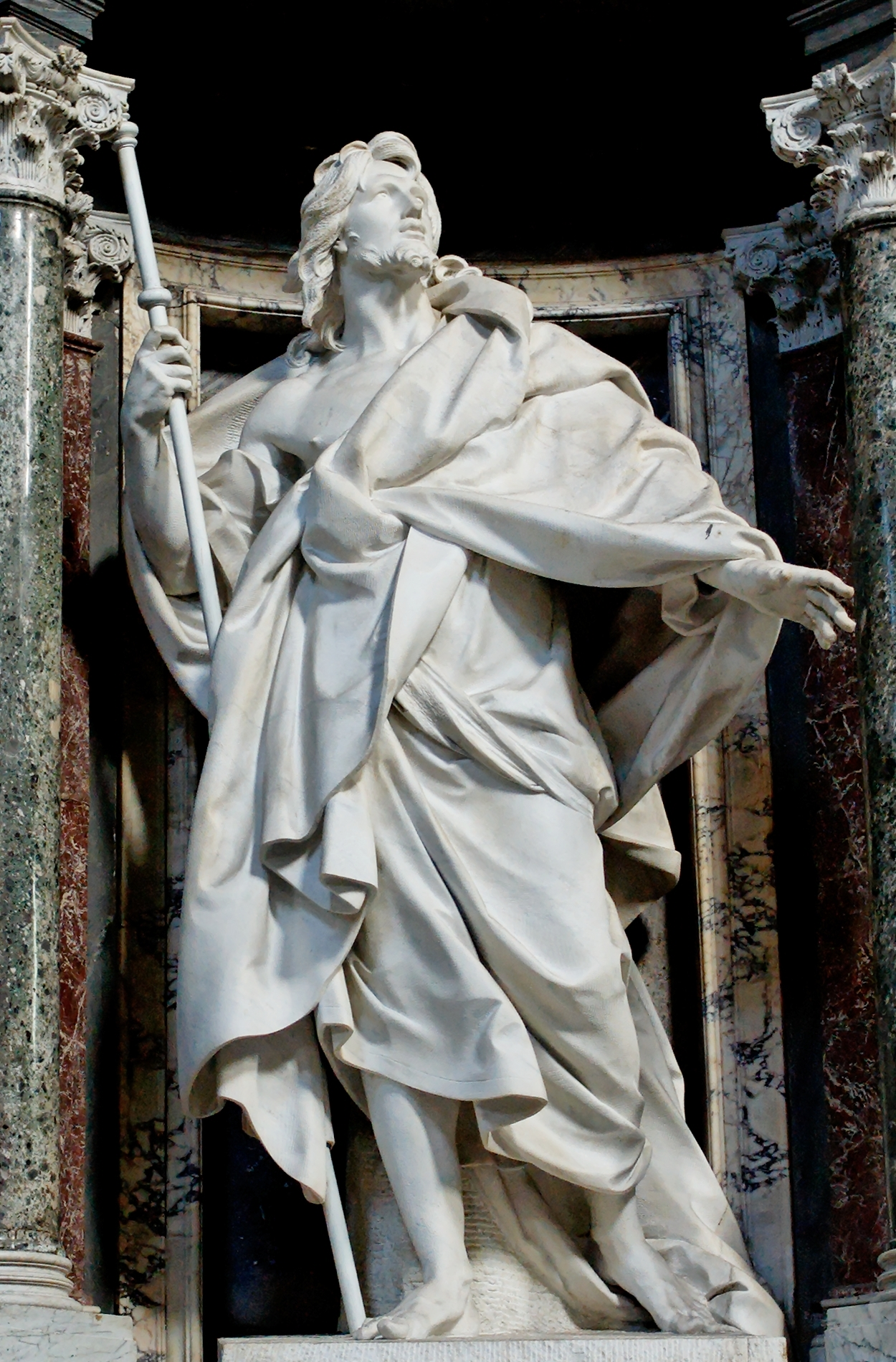
St. James the Greater, St. John Lateran

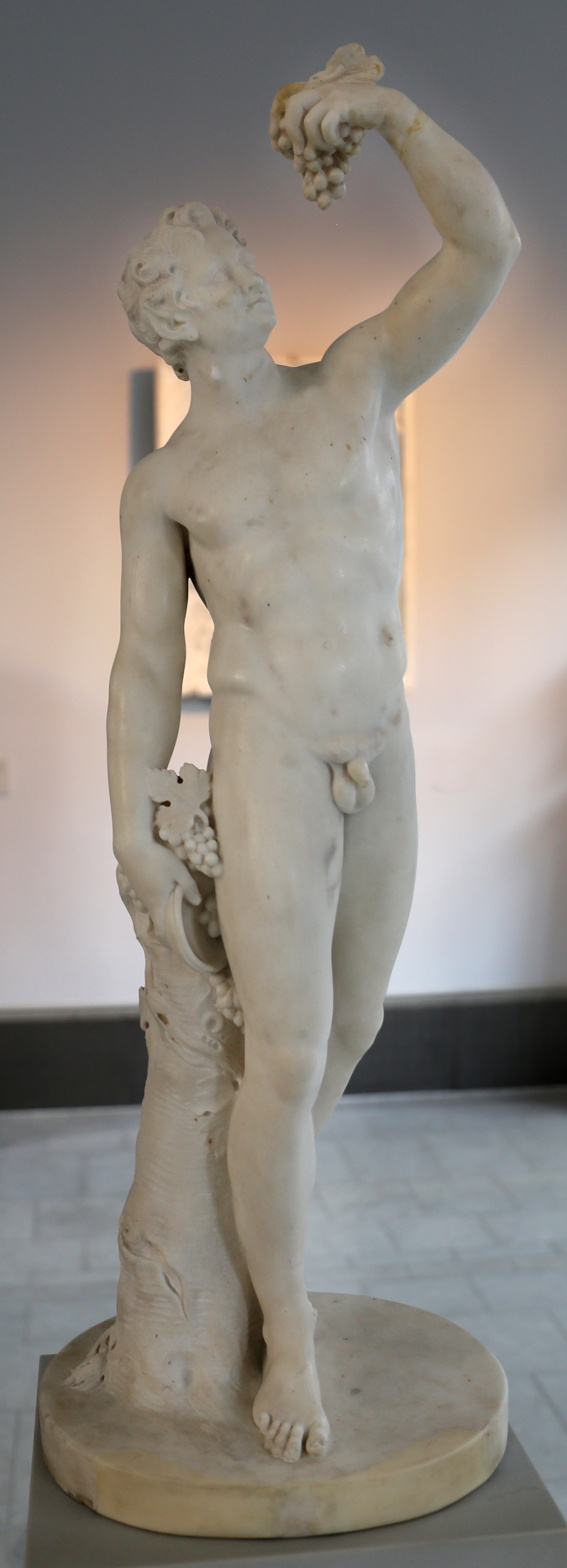
Faun from the Cortege of Bacchus, Bode Museum

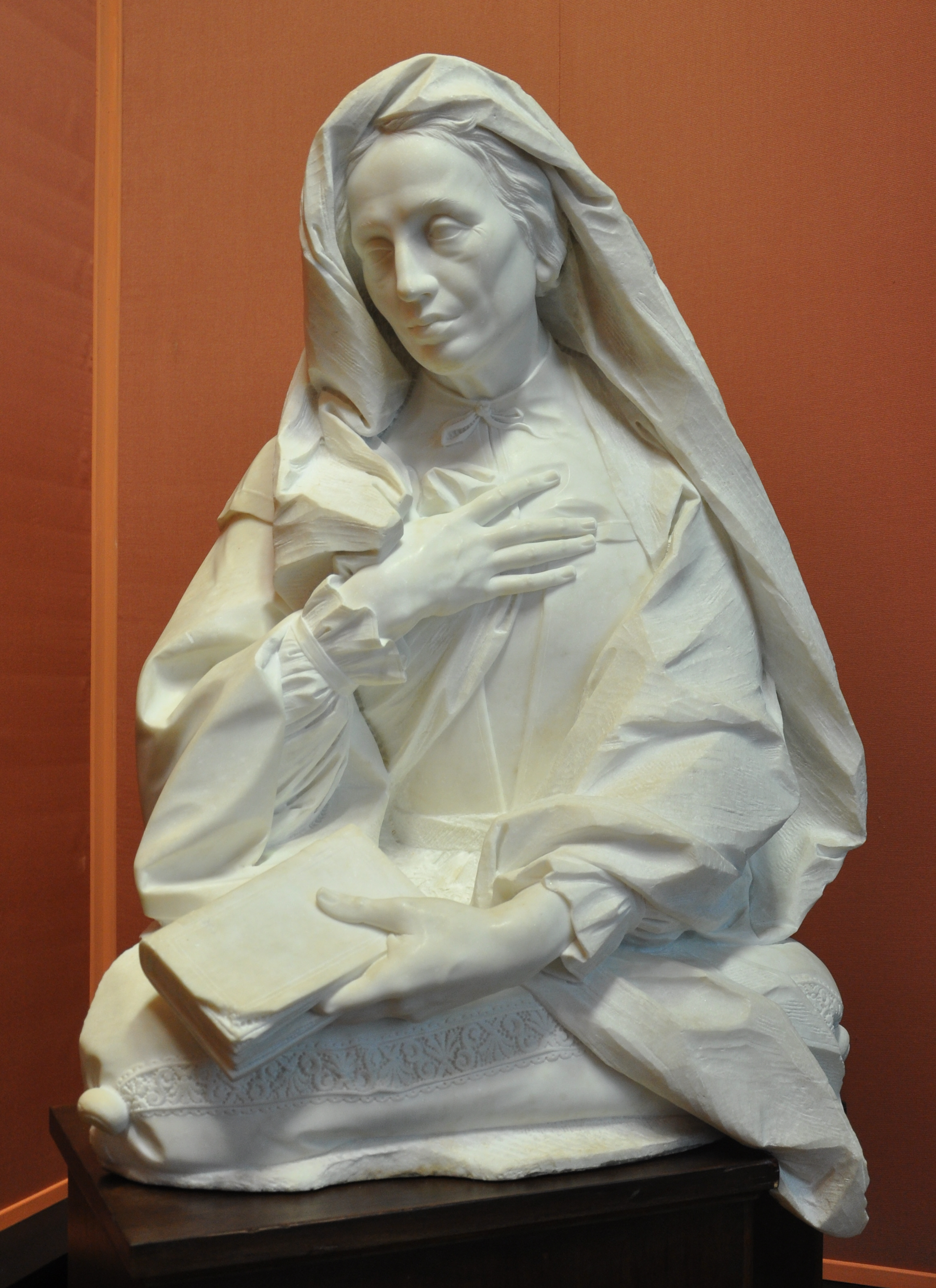
Bust of Giulia Albani degli Abati Olivieri, Kunsthistorisches Museum
