= Nicola Salvi =

Italian architect

Nicola Salvi or Niccolò Salvi (6 August 1697 in Rome – 8 February 1751 in Rome) was an Italian architect; among his few projects completed is the famous Trevi Fountain in Rome, Italy.

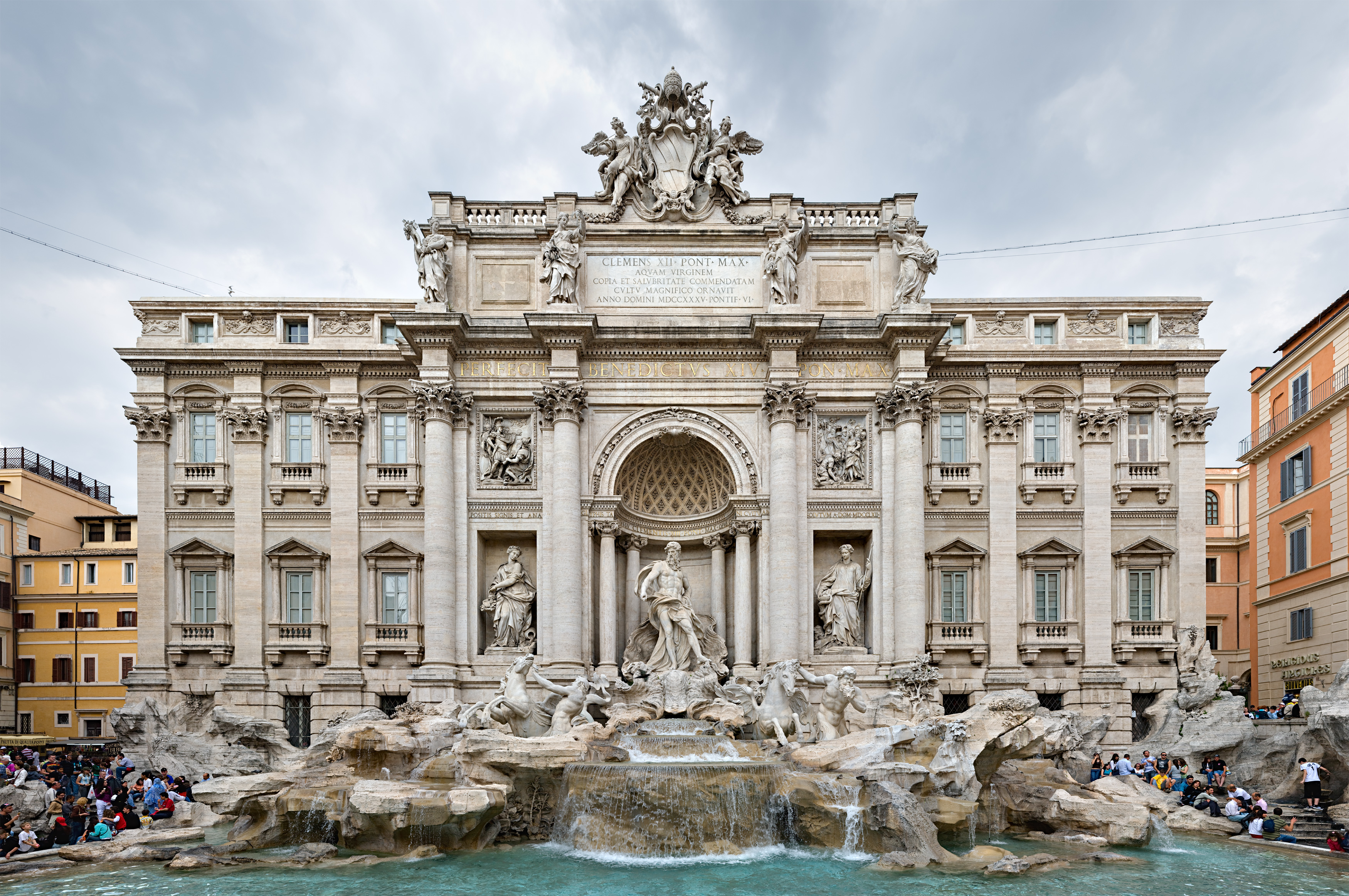
The Trevi Fountain (N. Salvi)

== Biography ==
Admitted to the Roman Academy of Arcadia in 1717, Salvi became an architect only after studies in mathematics and philosophy. His mentor in architecture was Antonio Canevari, who served also as consulting architect for the king of Portugal. In 1728, Canevari left for Lisbon, and Salvi continued his commissions in Rome. Among these were ephemeral decorations and small decorative projects. In Rome, the patronage for the building of large structures had declined relative to the previous century.

In 1732, competitions were held by Pope Clement XII for two large projects. One was to create a new façade for the church of Saint John Lateran, and another was for a public fountain at Trevi. The former competition was won by Alessandro Galilei, though Salvi's design had much praise. Salvi's design for the fountain however was chosen instead of plans by Ferdinando Fuga and his friend Luigi Vanvitelli. Salvi did not live to see the fountain completed in 1762 by his friend Pietro Bracci.

Salvi's other remaining works are few: he rebuilt the church of Santa Maria in Gradi (1738) in Viterbo, but it was destroyed by bombs in World War II and is still being restored. He also created a chapel, believed to be the most expensive ever created, for Igreja de São Roque Jesuit church in Lisbon, Portugal, along with Luigi Vanvitelli, and a tabernacle for the abbey of Monte Cassino.
