= Domingo Maria Sanni =

18th-century Italian painter

Domingo Maria Sanni (18th century) was an Italian painter and architect of the late Baroque period, active in Spain.

Confused by some with the Tuscan painter Sani di Pietro, he was. He was a chamber painter to King Carlos III of Spain, hence likely resided in Madrid. He lived for many years in the Palacio Real de San Ildelfonso, where he served the Queen mother, Isabel Farnese. He is described as participating in the construction of a gallery of sculpture at the Palacio La Granja. His paintings in the Prado Museum reflect Bamboccianti topics.
