= Madonna di Loreto =

Madonna di Loreto may refer to:

- Our Lady of Loreto, the title of the Virgin Mary with respect to the Holy House of Loreto and the image displayed there
- Madonna di Loreto (Caravaggio), a c. 1604–1606 painting
- Madonna of Loreto, a c. 1511 painting by Raphael
- Madonna of Loreto (Perugino), a c 1507 painting
