= The Prophet Isaiah (Raphael) =

Fresco by Raphael

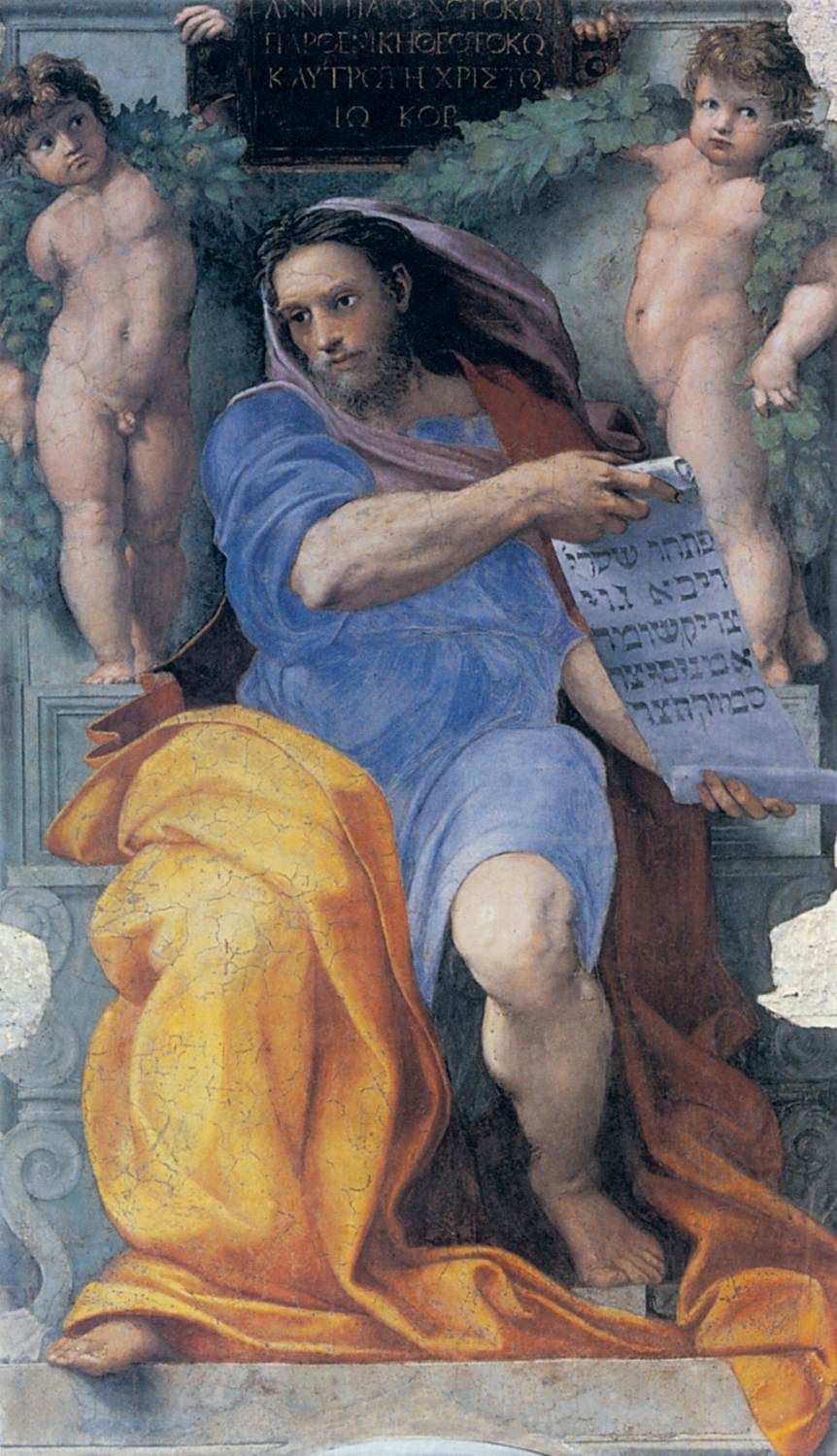
- Artist: Raphael
- Year: 1511-1512
- Type: Fresco
- Dimensions: 250 cm × 155 cm (98 in × 61 in)
- Location: Basilica di Sant'Agostino, Rome

The Prophet Isaiah is a fresco located in Basilica di Sant'Agostino, an early Renaissance church in Rome. It is an Italian Renaissance painting, influenced by Michelangelo's work on the Sistine Chapel ceiling.

Isaiah, a powerful figure, gives the illusion of a three-dimensional character, flanked by putti figures. He carries a scroll inscribed with a supplication in Hebrew for entry into Heaven (Isaiah XXVI:2–3). Above him is a dedication in Greek to Saint Anne. Due to wear, Raphael's work has been retouched by other painters over time. In 1960, the fresco was restored to Raphael's vision.

== St. Anne Altar ==
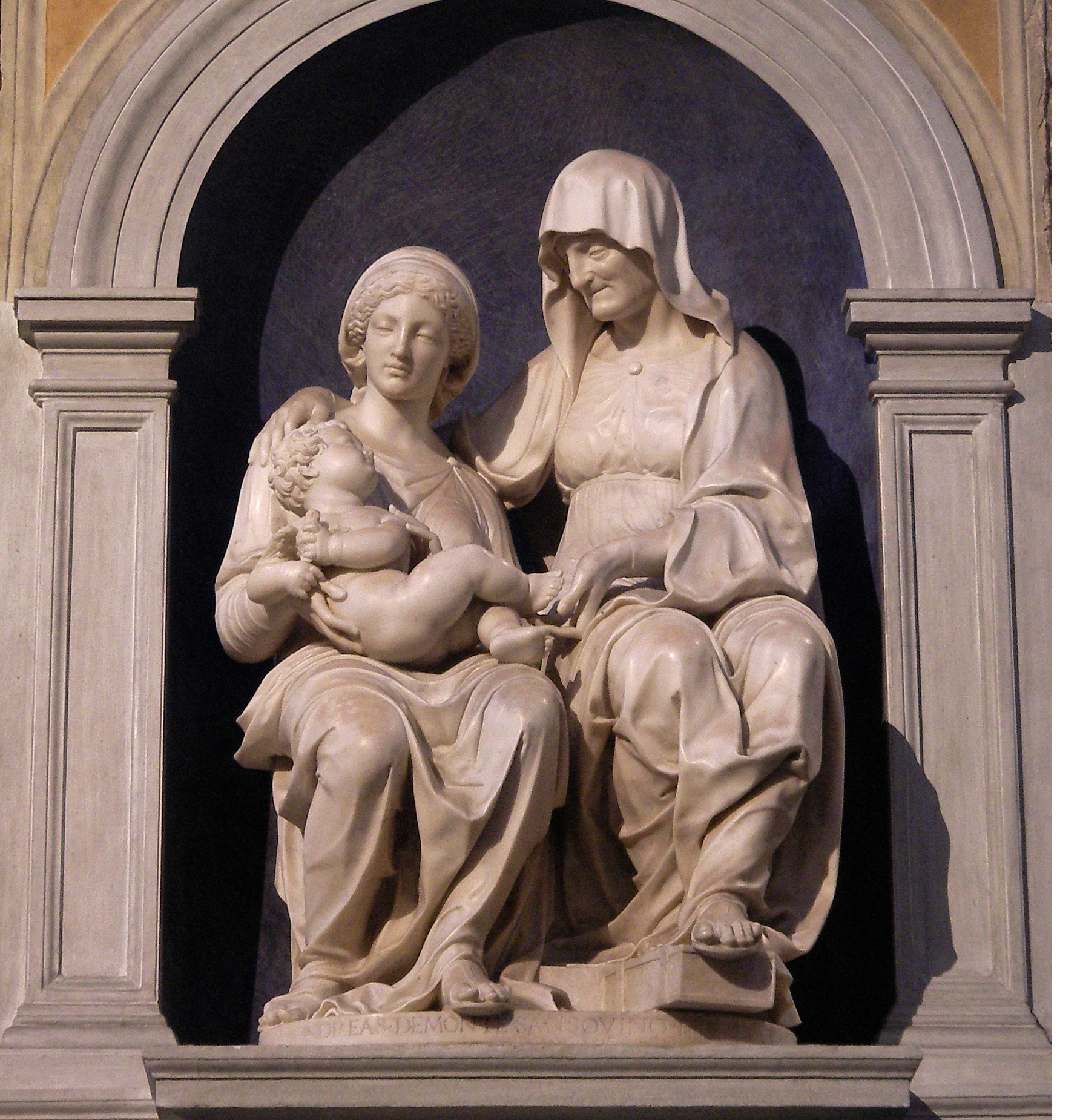
Madonna with Child and Anna by Andrea Sansovino

Johann of Goritz (also Gorizius), from Luxembourg, commissioned Raphael to paint the prophet Isaiah in fresco on a pillar in the Basilica di Sant'Agostino. Soon after his arrival in Rome, his name was Latinised to Janus Corycius. He held the office of receiver of requests.

Janus was a patron of the arts. Wishing to leave a mark in Rome, he had a chapel built in the Sant'Agostino basilica, with an altar commissioned in 1512 honoring his patron saint Saint Anne. The altar included this fresco of Isaiah and a marble grouping of Virgin with St. Anne by Andrea Sansovino. The Saint Anne altar was intended as his tomb.

At the dedication of the church, a steady stream of literary friends honored Corycius with verses that were later published in the 1524 book Coryciana by Blosius Palladius, later Bishop of Foligno. The book named 120 poets who contributed verses.

During a renovation of the church in the 18th century, the sculpture by Sansovino was separated from Raphael's fresco. In the late 20th century the fresco was conserved and the sculpture was restored to its original position below.

== Michelangelo influence ==
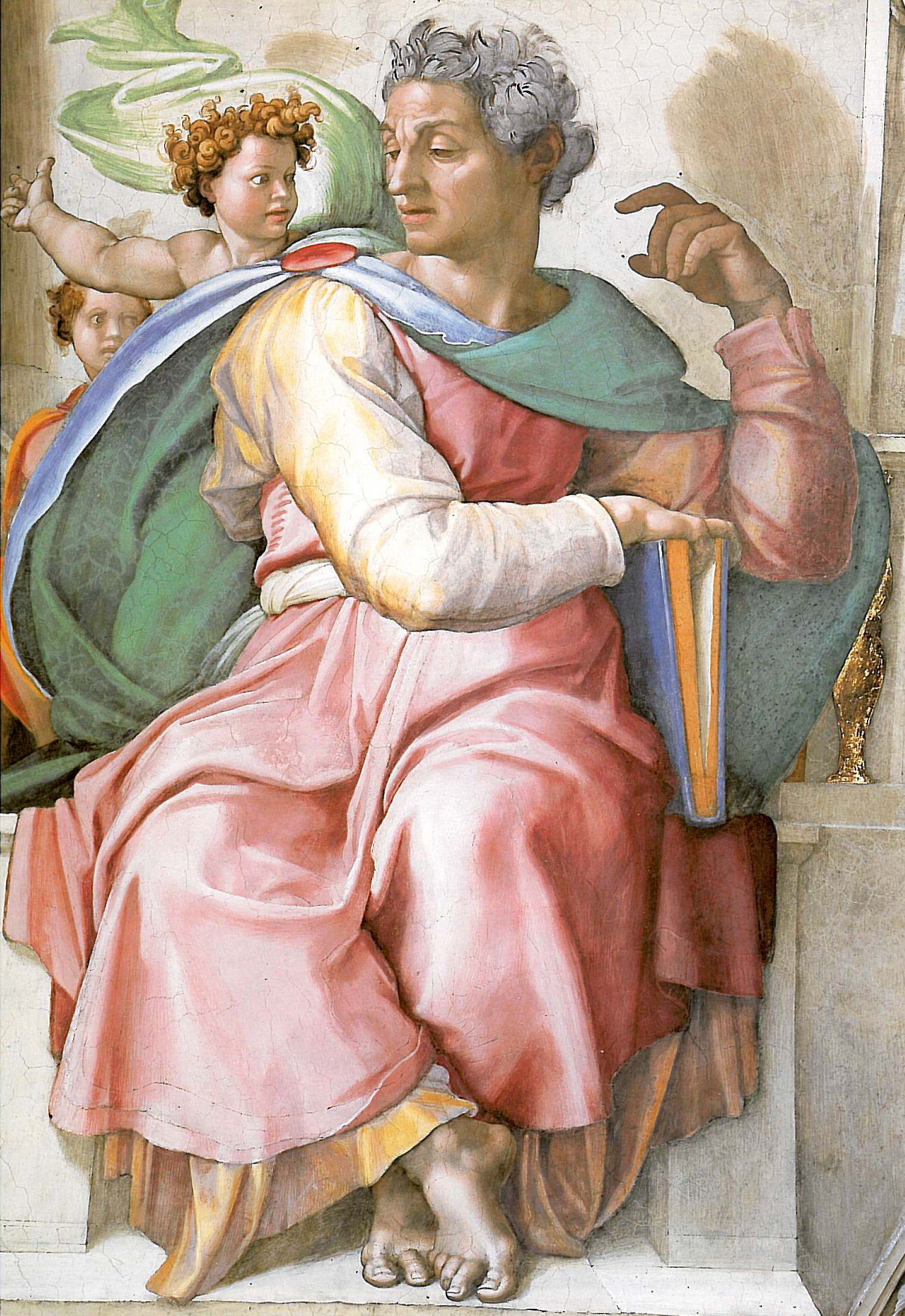
Prophet Isaiah by Michelangelo

Much comparison is made of the Raphael fresco Prophet Isaiah to the work of Michelangelo, Ernst Gombrich going as far to suggest that Michelangelo may have hired Raphael to work on Ezekiel for the Sistine Chapel, which he believes is much more reflective of Raphael than of Michelangelo. This would have allowed Raphael to both gain influence by Michelangelo and also contribute to the decoration of the Sistine Chapel.

Within the Prophet of Isaiah, noted influences by Michelangelo include:

- similarity of figural composition
- self-enclosed situation of Isaiah
- the manner in which the scroll is held, in a spiral formula as evolved by Michelangelo

Legend has it that Corycius complained to Michelangelo that he had been overcharged for the fresco, to which Michelangelo responded, "the knee alone is worth the price demanded."

== See also ==
- List of paintings by Raphael
