= Sant'Agostino, Rome =

Roman Catholic basilica, a landmark of Rome, Italy

The Basilica of Saint Augustine of Hippo in Camp Martius
- Latin: Basilica Sancti Augustini in Campo Martio; Italian: Basilica di Sant'Agostino in Campo Marzio
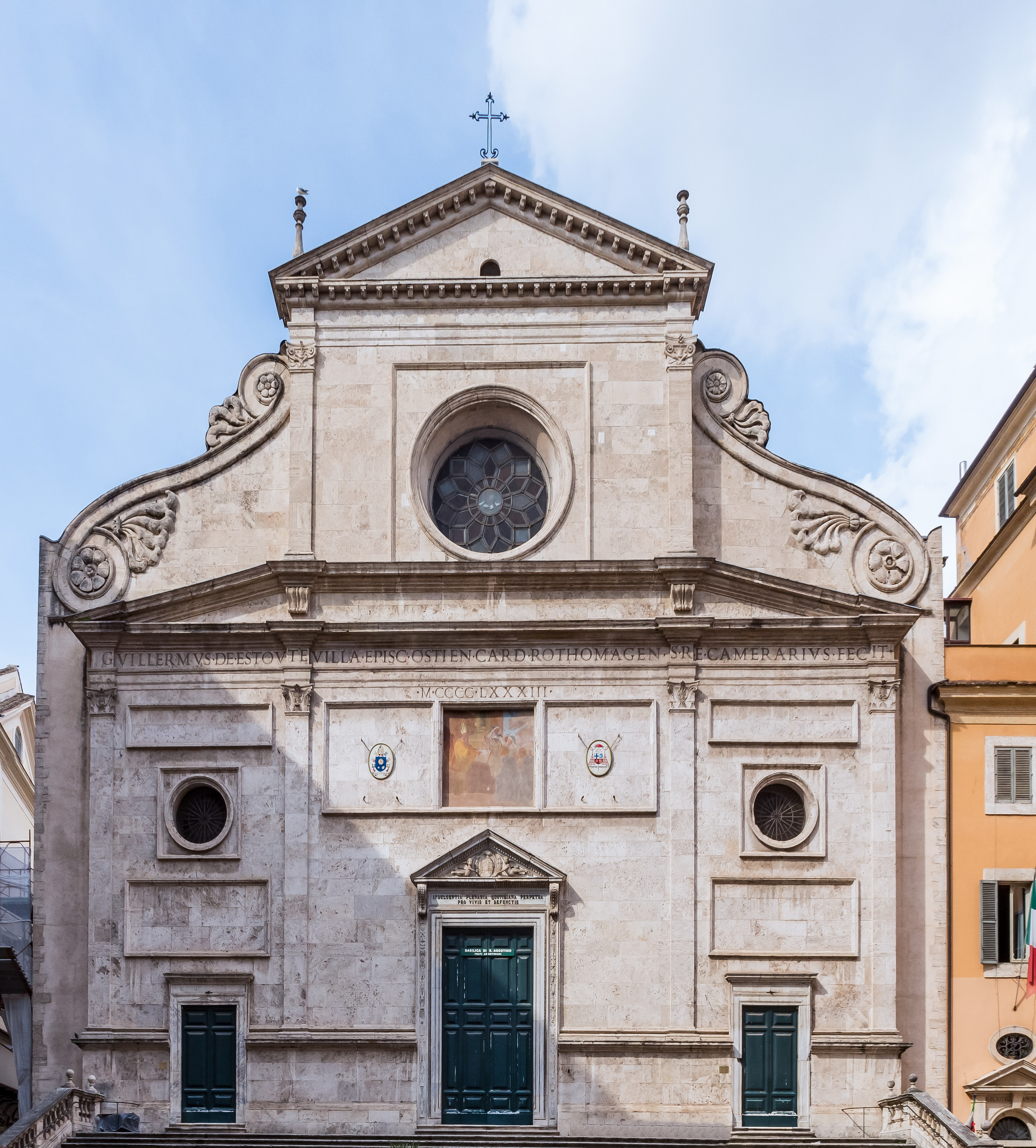
- Façade as seen from Piazza di Sant’Agostino
- Click on the map for a fullscreen view
- 41°54′3″N 12°28′27″E
- Location: 80 Via della Scrofa (parish office), Rome
- Country: Italy
- Denomination: Catholic
- Religious order: Order of Saint Augustine
- Website: www.agostiniani.it

History
- Status: Minor basilica
- Founder(s): Pope Boniface VIII; Guillaume d'Estouteville
- Dedication: Augustine of Hippo; Tryphon: Saint Tryphon

Architecture
- Functional status: Active
- Architect(s): Giacomo di Pietrasanta; Francesco Borromini; Baccio Pontelli; Luigi Vanvitelli; Carlo Murena
- Style: Roman renaissance

Administration
- Diocese: Diocese of Rome

The Basilica of Saint Augustine of Hippo in the Campus Martius (Italian: Basilica di Sant'Agostino in Campo Marzio; Latin: Basilica Sancti Augustini in Campo Martio), more commonly known as Sant'Agostino, is a titular church in Rome, Italy. Dedicated to Saint Augustine of Hippo, it now serves as the motherhouse of the Order of Saint Augustine. The current basilica was completed in 1483 and is notable for its Renaissance architecture and artworks by Caravaggio, Raphael, and Guercino. Saint Monica, the mother of Saint Augustine, is buried here. On 29 October 1999, Pope John Paul II elevated the church to the rank of minor basilica.

== History ==
The former parish of Saint Tryphon in Posterula Church was built at this site in 700 A.D. and was originally dedicated to the martyr Saint Tryphon of Campsada. The Order of Saint Augustine was founded at the Basilica of Santa Maria del Popolo in Rome in 1244. The Augustinian friars soon desired to have their main monastery and church closer to Vatican City. The Roman nobleman Egidio Lufredi donated land near here in Campo Marzio to the Augustinian friars in 1286. On 20 February 1287 Pope Honorius IV granted the St. Tryphon in Posterula Church to the Augustinian friars.

The first building structure was commissioned by Pope Boniface VIII, was built here by the Augustinian friars in 1296-1446 right next to the St. Tryphon in Posterula Church. The construction of the second (current) basilica began in 1479. It was commissioned by Pope Sixtus IV; designed by architect Baccio Pontelli (who also designed the Sistine Chapel); and funded by Cardinal Guillaume d'Estouteville. Its construction was completed in 1483. Giacomo di Pietrasanta (?-1495) built its façade by using travertine salvaged from the ruins of the Colosseum. Its façade reads the following:

Guillermus de Estoutevilla, Episcopus Ostiensis, Cardinalis Rothomagensis, Sanctæ Romanæ Ecclesiæ, Camerarius, Fecit MCCCCLXXXIII

English: Guillaume d'Estouteville, the Bishop of Ostia, Cardinal of Rouen of the Holy Roman Church, Camerlengo, built this in the Year 1483.

Its first restoration was completed in 1763 by Luigi Vanvitelli; its second restoration was completed in 1870; and its most recent restoration occurred in 1998–2000.

The title of Sant'Agostino has been held by Cardinal Jean-Pierre Ricard since 2006. It is the station church of the first Saturday in Lent.

== Artwork ==
The 1606 painting Madonna of Loreto (also known as the Madonna of the Pilgrims) by Caravaggio is located in the first chapel on the left. The heirs of Ermete Cavalletti (?-1602) bought the Pieta Chapel on 4 September 1603 and soon commissioned Caravaggio to paint the Madonna for their family's chapel. It was hung in 1606 at the altar in the Cavalletti Chapel (former Pieta Chapel) in place of a Pieta that was sold to Pope Paul V (formerly Cardinal Camillo Borghese).

The 1512 fresco Prophet Isaiah by Raphael is located on the third pilaster of the left nave. It was part of the funerary monument of Johannes Goritz (1455–1527; also known as Janus Corycius). Isaiah holds a Hebrew scroll stating: "Open the doors, so that the people who believe may enter." (Isaiah 26:2–3) The statue Saint Anne and Virgin with Child (1512) by Andrea Sansovino is located below Raphael's Isaiah.

The 1521 sculpture Madonna del Parto (Our Lady of Childbirth) by Jacopo Sansovino is based, according to a legend, on an ancient statue of Agrippina holding Nero in her arms, is reputed by tradition to work miracles in childbirth. It is located in a niche to the right of the entrance and is surrounded by thank-offerings of flowers and candles.

The 1588 frescoes of St. John the Baptist and St. John the Evangelist by Avanzino Nucci are also here.

The 1616 ceiling fresco Assumption of Mary and three paintings by Giovanni Lanfranco are located in the Buongiovanni Chapel (in the left transept).

The 1600s painting Saints Augustine, John the Evangelist and Jerome by Guercino is also here.

The sculpture St. Thomas of Villanova Distributing Alms by Melchiorre Cafà and completed by his mentor Ercole Ferrata is located in the St. Thomas of Villanova Chapel (left end of transept). The etching Charity of St Thomas of Villanova by Cafà himself illustrates this same sculpture.

The 1628 High Altar was designed by Orazio Turriani. It was previously (but erroneously) thought that Gian Lorenzo Bernini had designed it.

Its nave ceiling fresco was completed in 1868 by Pietro Gagliardi; who also made the 5 prophet pillar frescoes (including Ezekiel), 6 Old Testament women & 12 scenes from the life of the Virgin Mary.

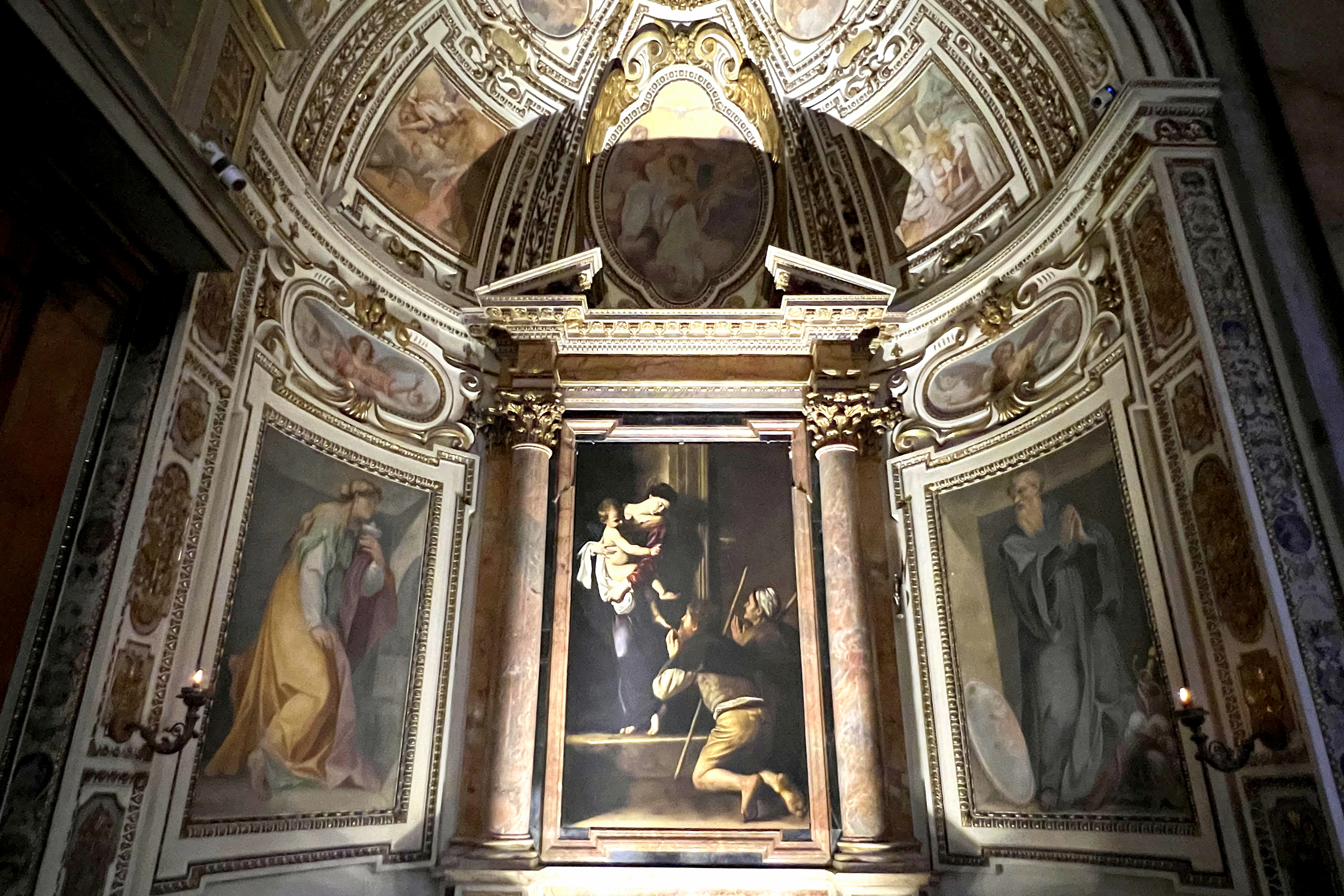
Cavalletti Chapel

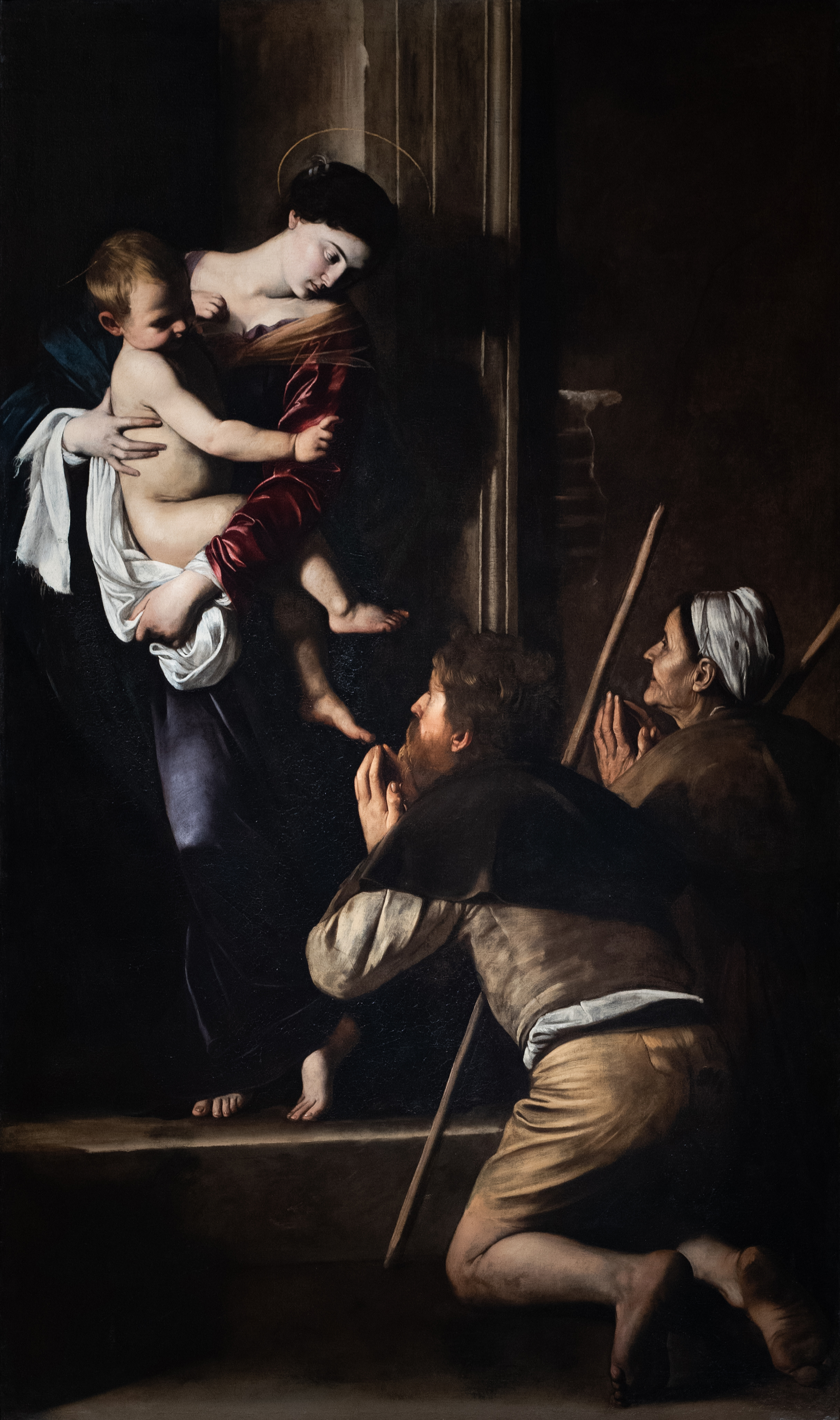
Caravaggio, Madonna of Loreto (1606)

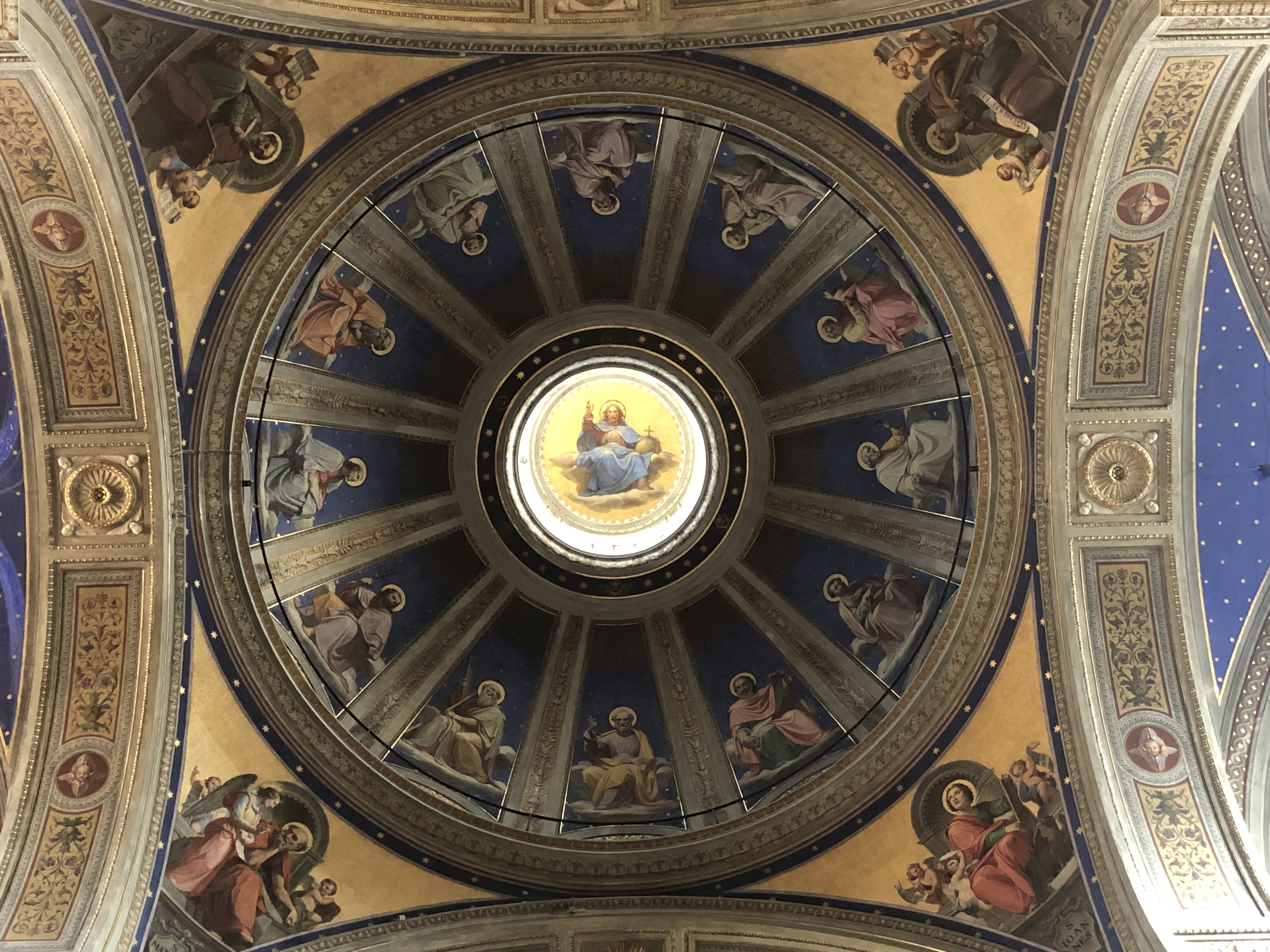
Dome ceiling painting depicting Jesus and the Twelve Apostles

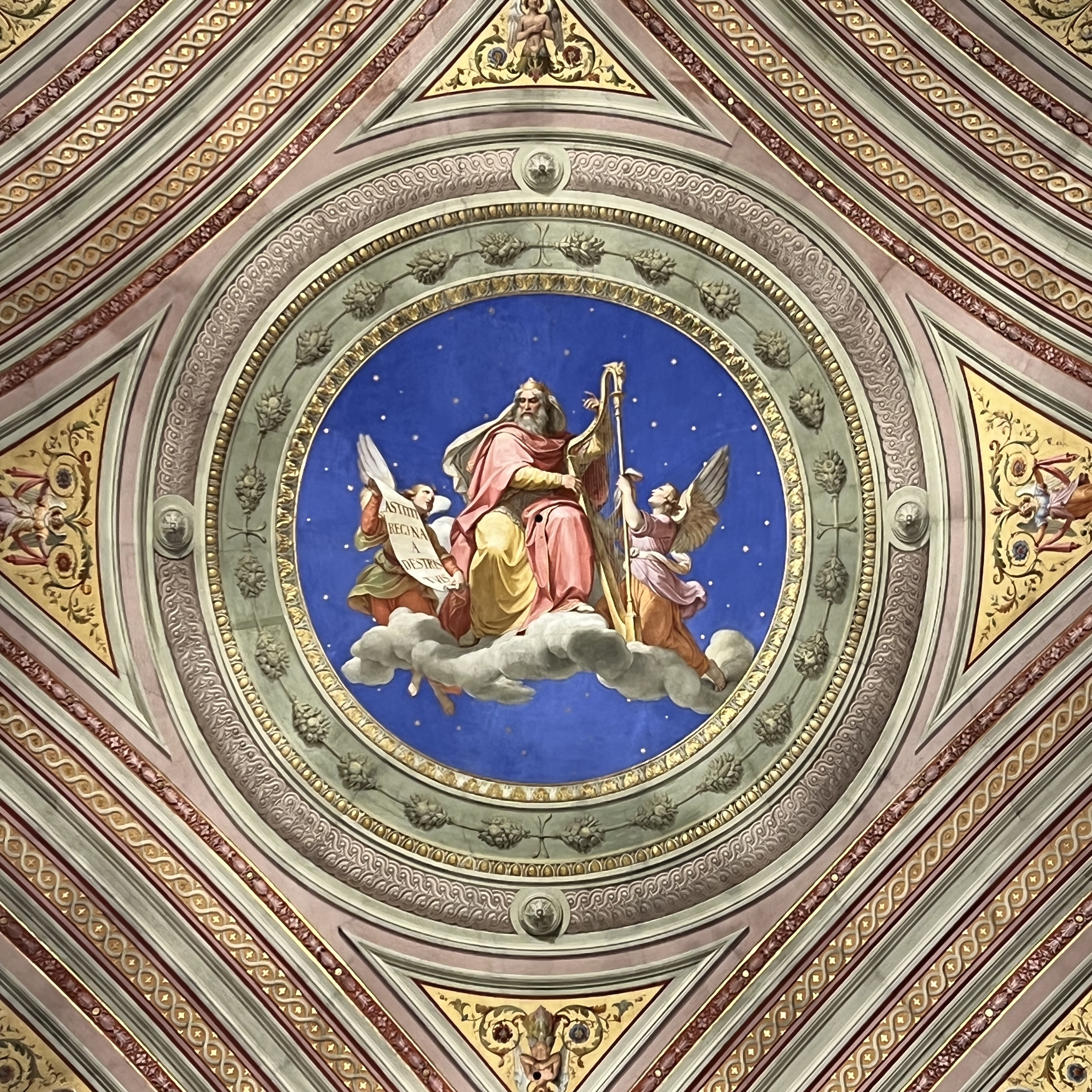
Pietro Gagliardi, nave ceiling fresco (1868)

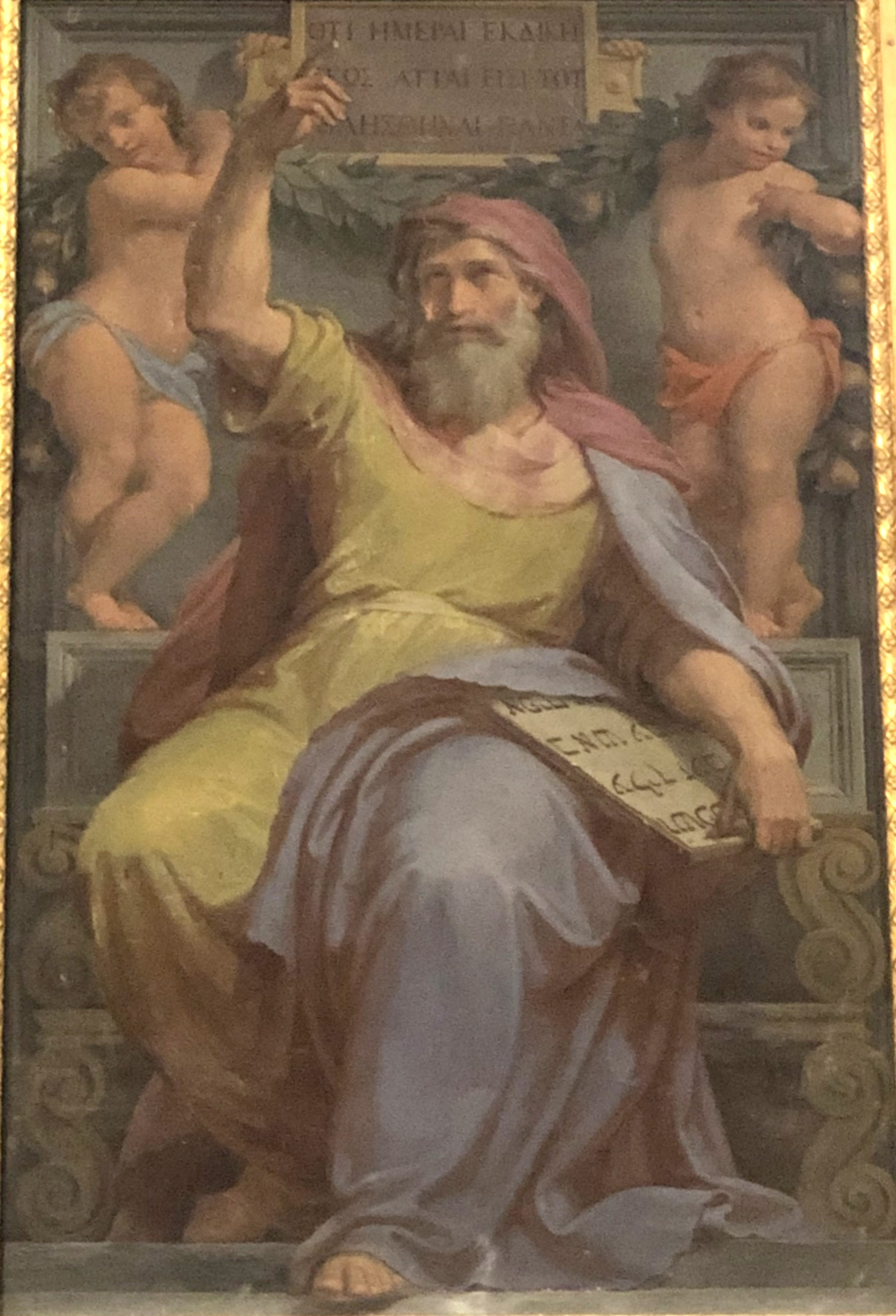
Pietro Gagliardi, Ezekiel (1860s)

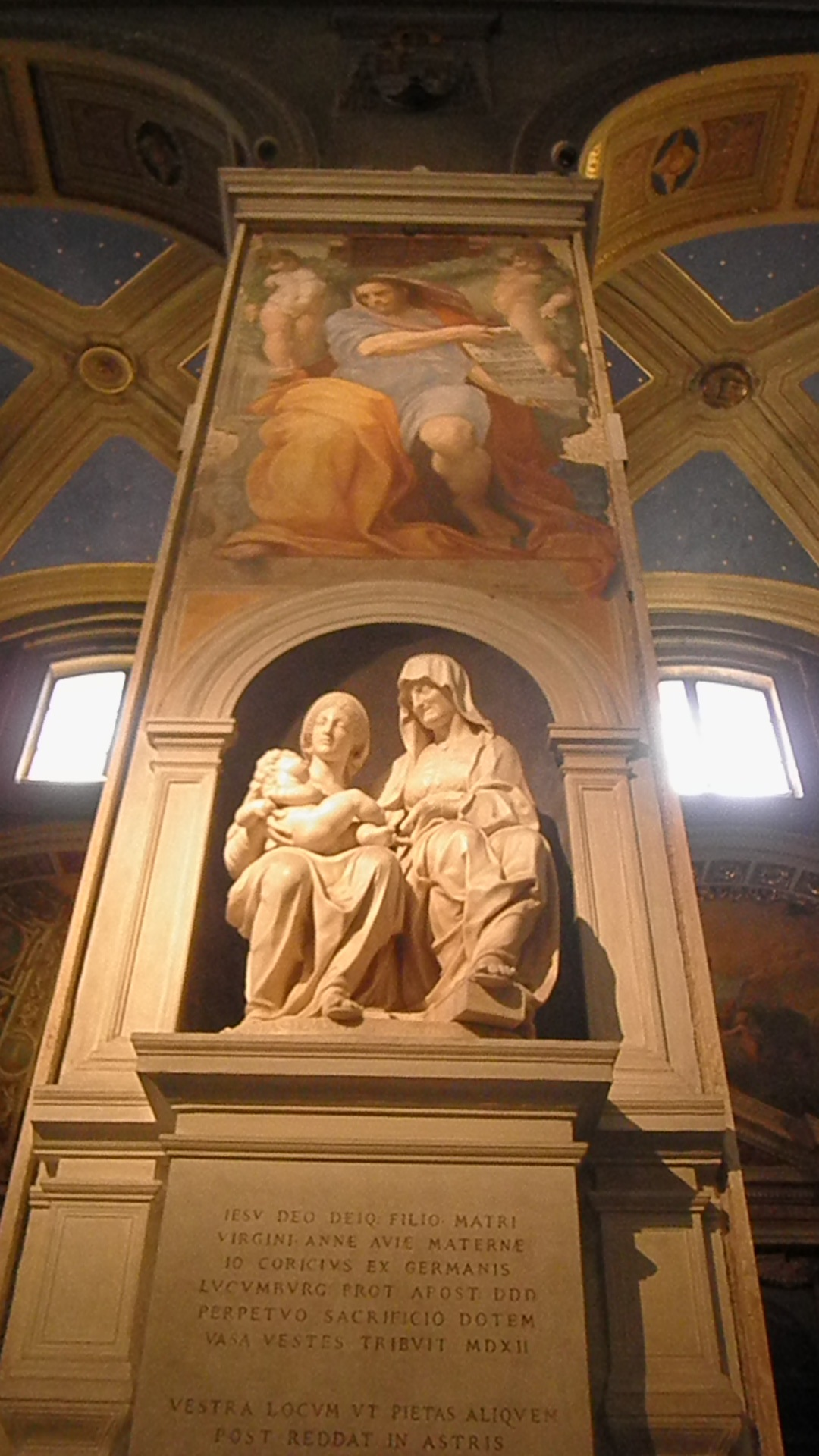
Raphael, Prophet Isaiah (1512) and Andrea Sansovino, Saint Anne and Virgin with Child (1512)

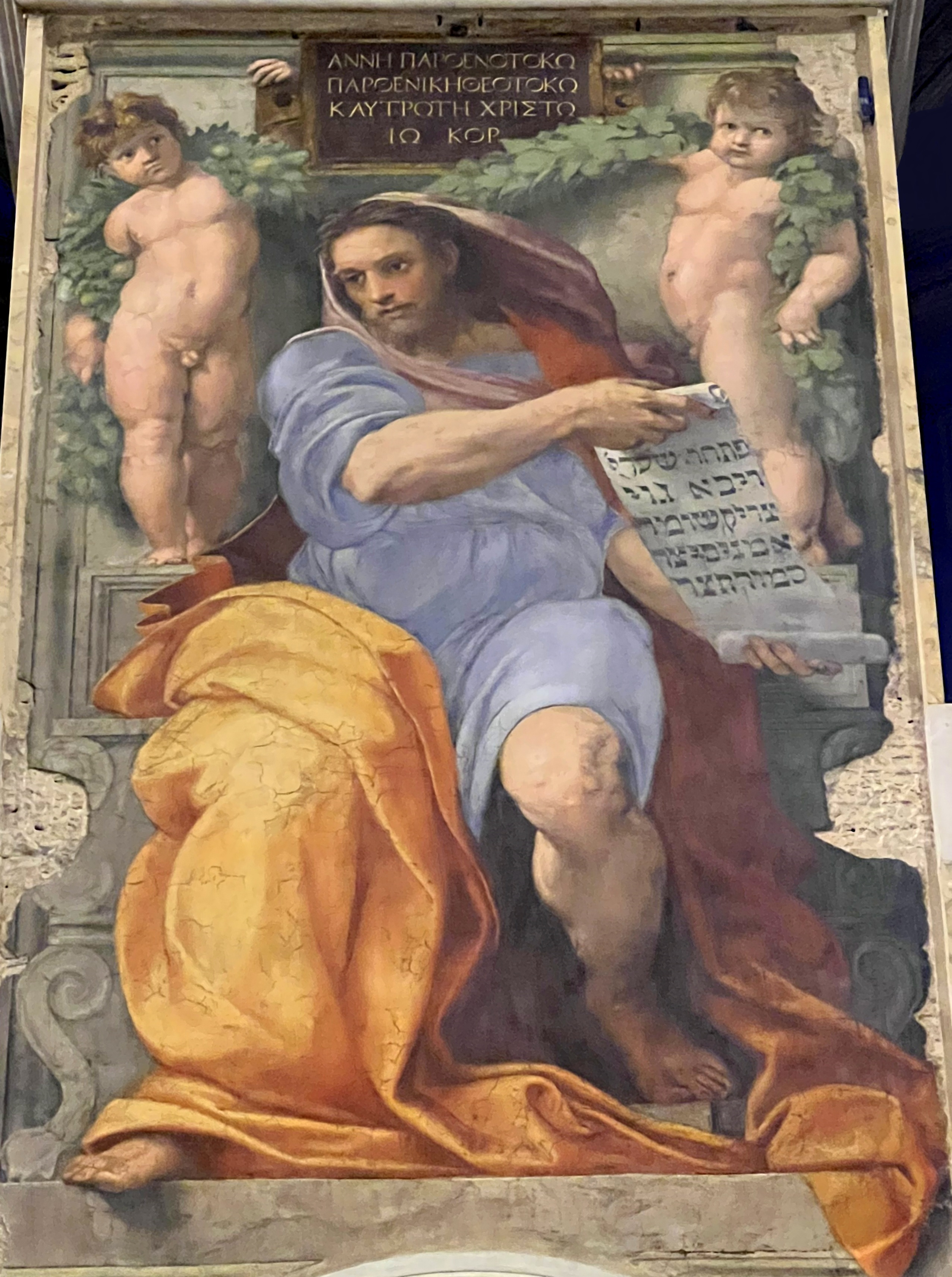
Raphael, Prophet Isaiah (1512)

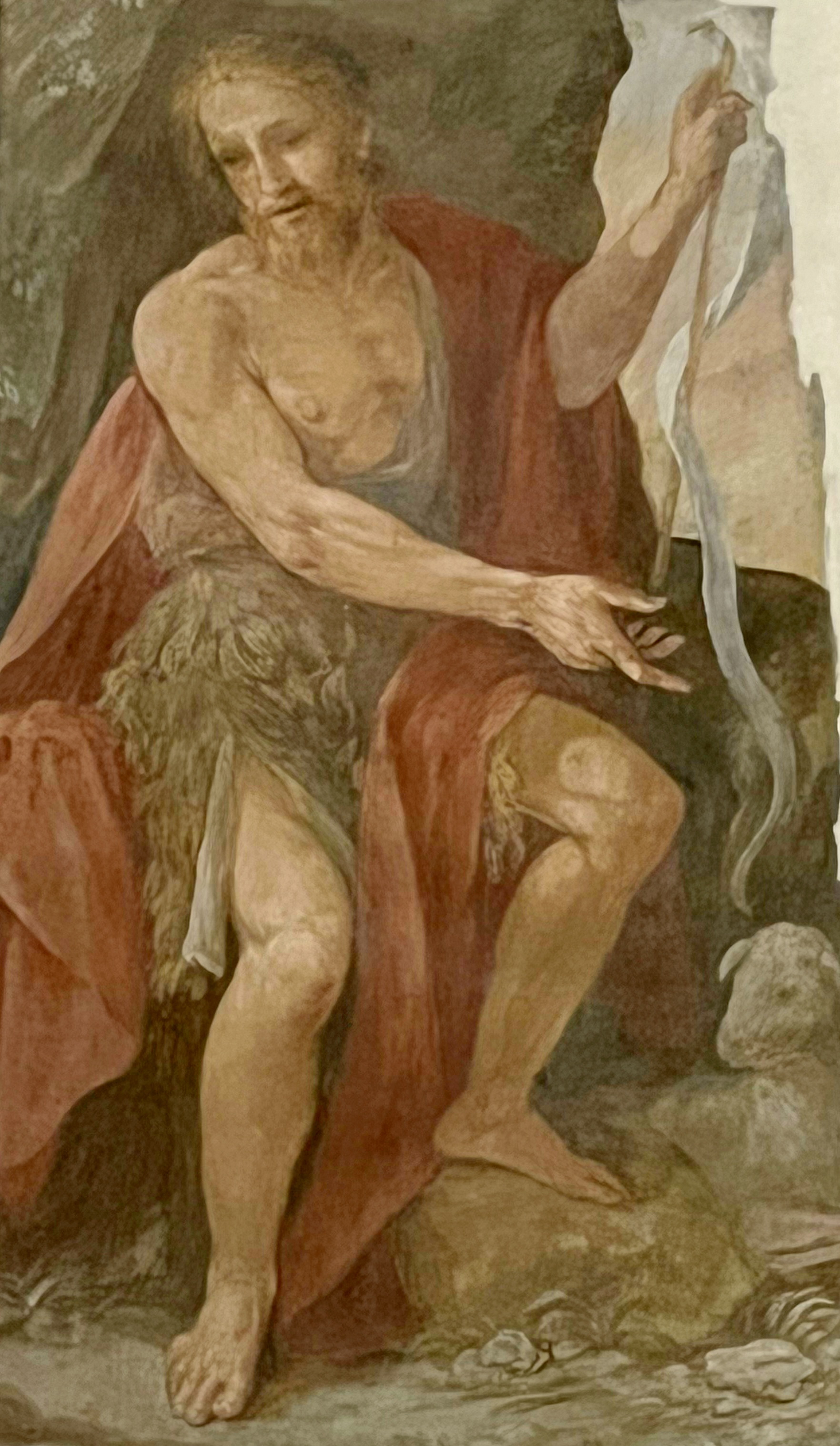
Avanzino Nucci, John the Baptist (1588)

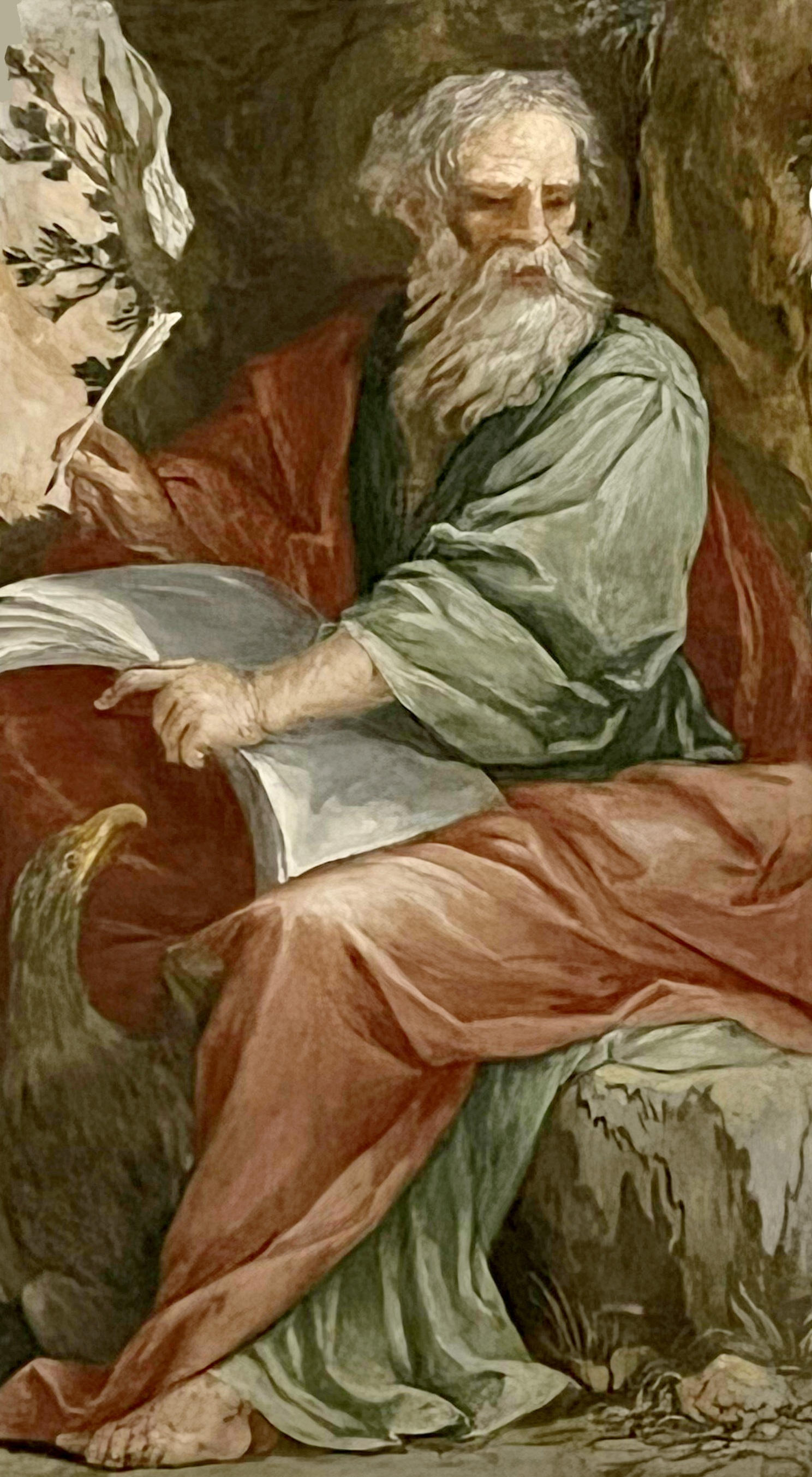
Avanzino Nucci, John the Evangelist (1588)

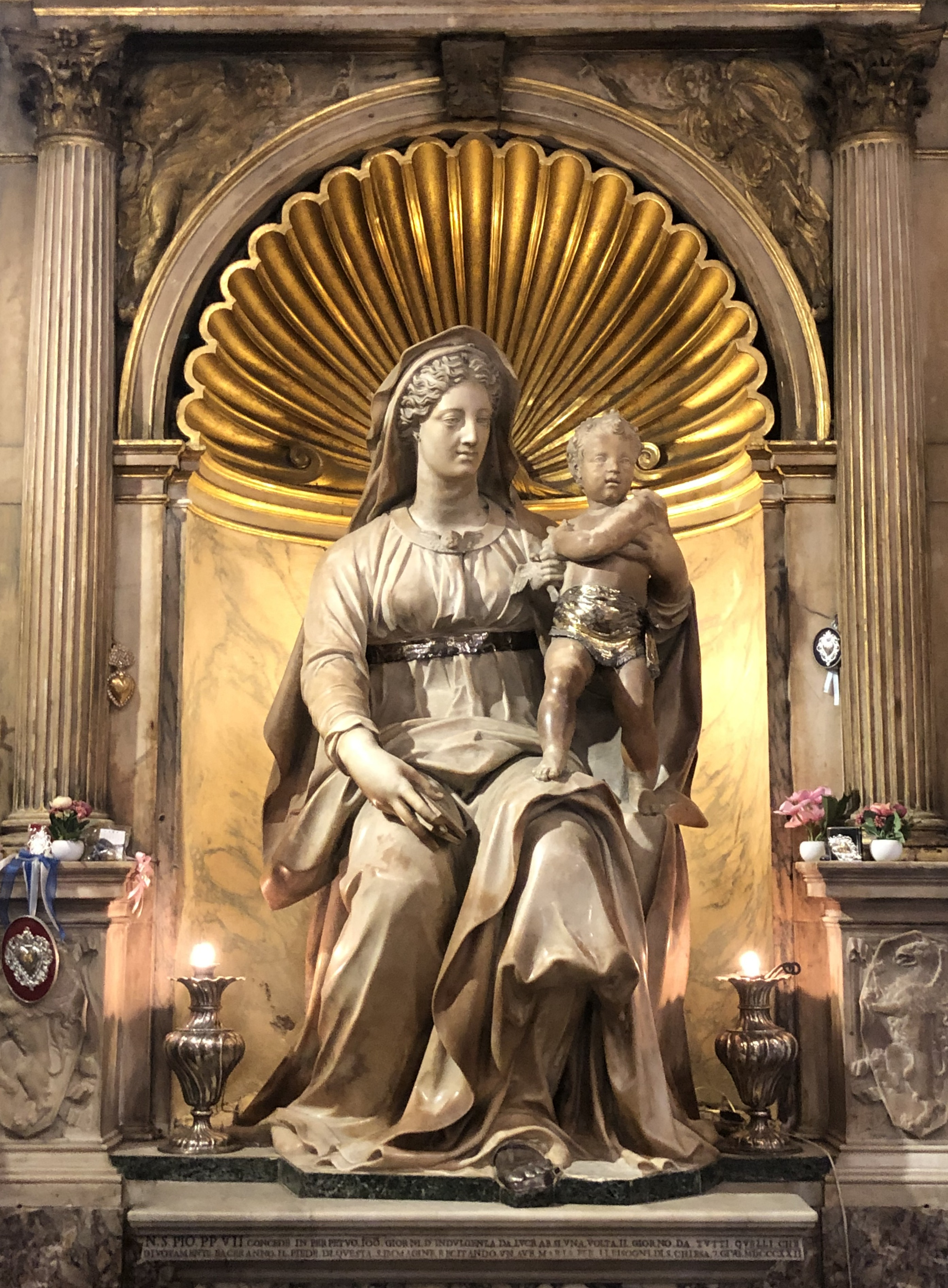
Jacopo Sansovino, Madonna del Parto (1521)

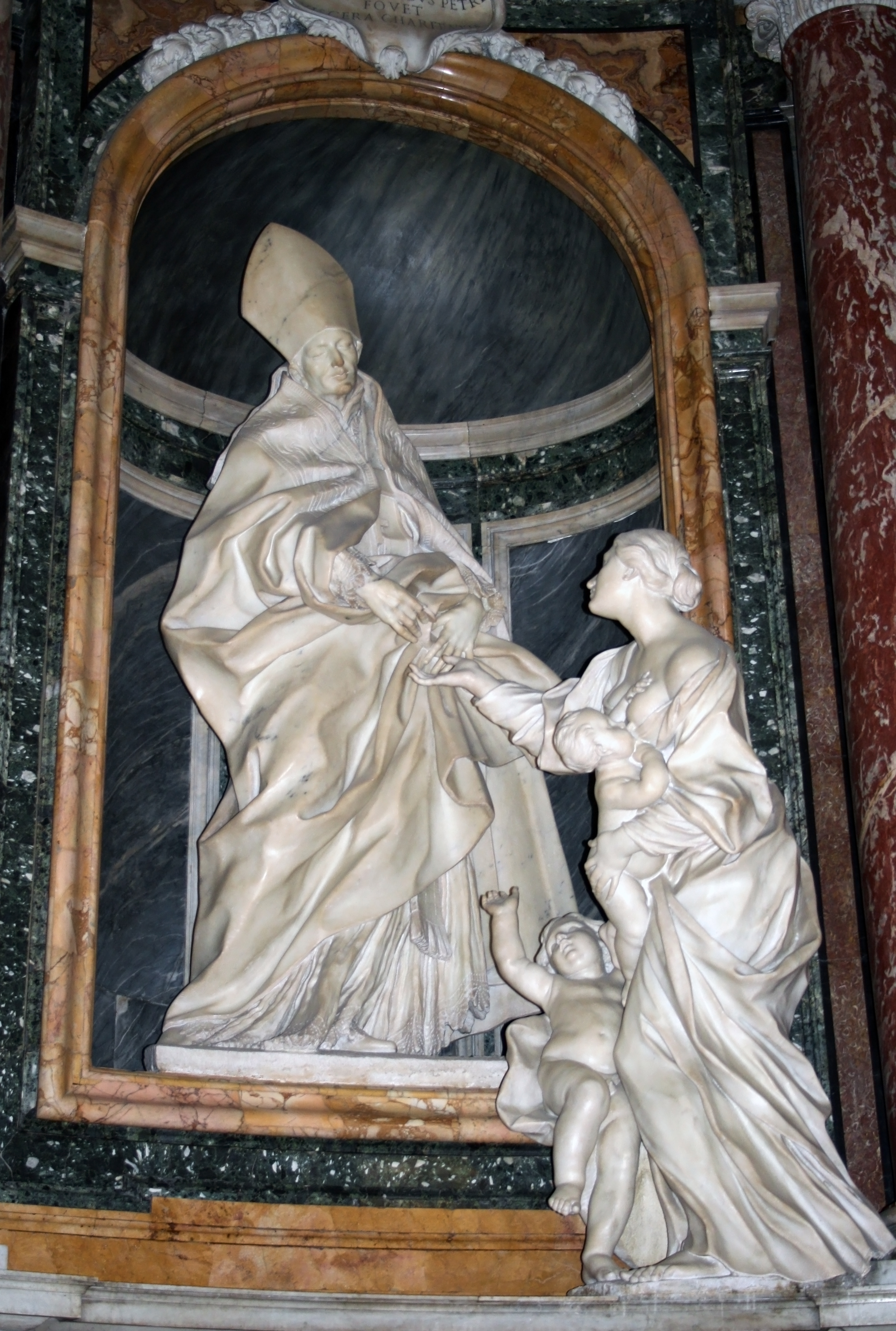
Melchiorre Cafà, St. Thomas of Villanova Distributing Alms (1600s)

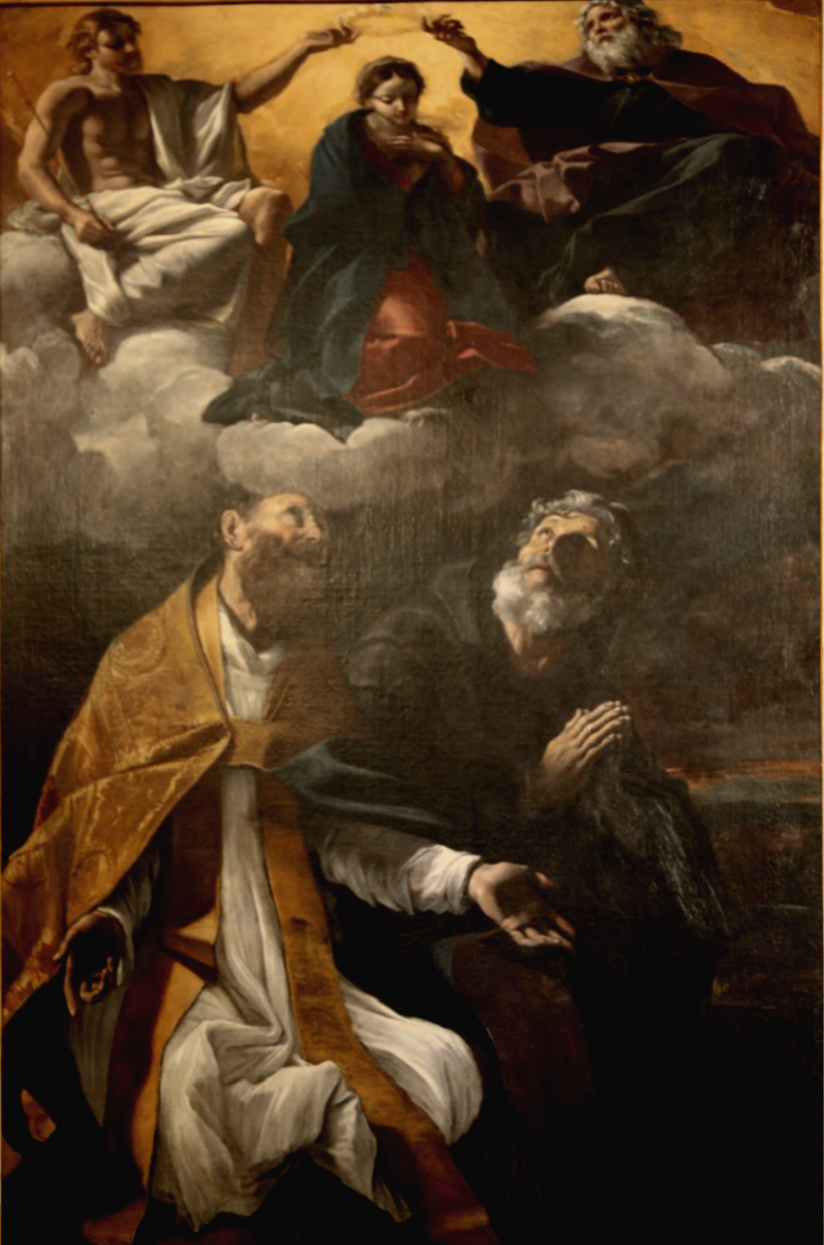
Giovanni Lanfranco, Coronation of the Virgin with Saints Augustine and William (1619)

== Tombs ==
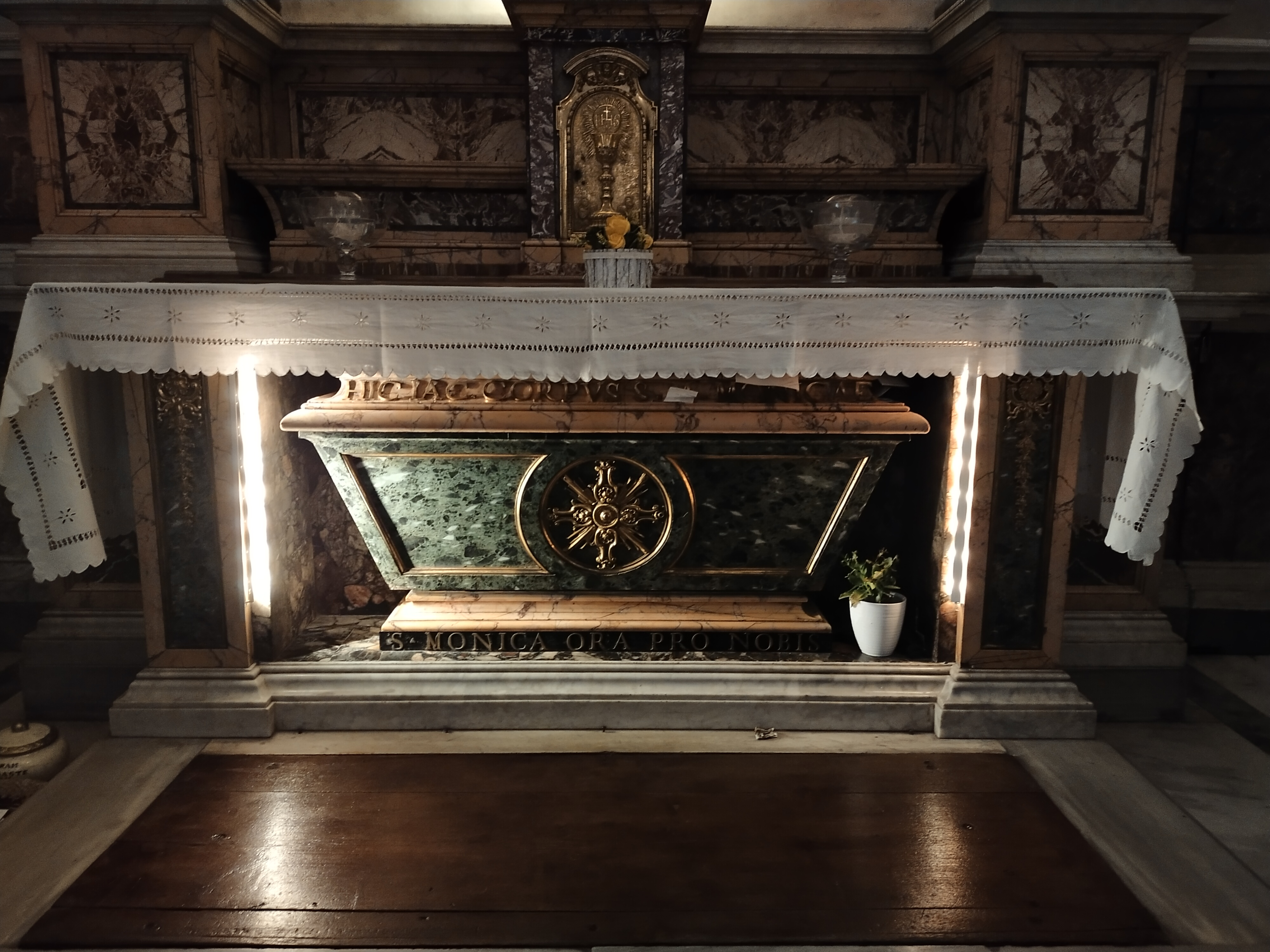
Tomb of Saint Monica

St. Tryphon of Campsada died in AD 250 and is located under the High Altar.

Saint Monica died in 387. Her tomb was transferred here from the Santa Aurea Church in Ostia Antica, Italy on 11 April 1424. Her sarcophagus was designed by Isaia da Pisa (1410–1464) in 1455, and is now located in the Chapel of Saint Monica (left of the apse).

Norways's Archbishop Olav Trondsson died on 25 November 1474. His tombstone reads: "CVI DEDERAT SACRAM MERITO NORVEGIA SEDEM HIC TEGIT OLAVI FRIGIDVS OSSA LAPIS" (Here a cold stone covers the bones of Olav, to whom Norway rightly gave the holy chair).

Cardinal Guillaume d'Estouteville died on 22 January 1483.

Cardinal Giuseppe Renato Imperiali died on 18 February 1737. Pietro Bracci designed and sculpted his polychrome tomb in 1741.

The inscriptions found in the basilica have been collected and published by Vincenzo Forcella.

== List of Cardinal-Priests ==
Pope Sixtus V (1585–1590) established the titular church of a cardinal priest in April 1587. The following is a list of cardinal-priests at Sant'Agostino since 1590:

Image	Name	Dates	Notes
	Gregorio Petrocchini	23 Mar 1590 – 28 May 1608	Transferred to Santa Maria in Trastevere
	Fabrizio Verallo	10 Dec 1608 – 17 Nov 1624	Died
	Berlinghiero Gessi	19 Jul 1627 – 6 Apr 1639	Died
	Ottaviano Raggi	10 Feb 1642 – 31 Dec 1643	Died
	Niccolò Albergati-Ludovisi	24 Apr 1645 – 25 Jun 1646	Transferred to Santa Maria degli Angeli e dei Martiri
	Fabrizio Savelli	16 Dec 1647 – 26 Feb 1659	Died
	Antonio Bichi	1 Dec 1659 – 14 Nov 1667	Transferred to Santa Maria degli Angeli e dei Martiri
	Federico Borromeo	23 Feb 1671 – 8 Aug 1672	Transferred to Sant'Agnese fuori le mura
	Francesco Lorenzo Brancati di Lauria	22 Sept 1681 – 1 Dec 1681	Transferred to Santi Apostoli
	Carlo Ciceri	7 Jul 1687 – 24 Jun 1694	Died
	Henry Noris	2 Jan 1696 – 23 Feb 1704	Died
	Carlo Agostino Fabroni	25 Jun 1706 – 19 Sep 1727	Died
	Angelo Maria Querini	22 Dec 1727 – 8 Mar 1728	Transferred to San Marco
	Gregorio Selleri	10 May 1728 – 31 May 1729	Died
	Marco Antonio Ansidei	6 Jul 1729 – 14 Feb 1730	Died
	Bartolomeo Massei	8 Jan 1731 – 20 Nov 1745	Died
	Giorgio Doria	15 Dec 1745 – 31 Jan 1759	Died
	Gaetano Fantuzzi	19 Nov 1759 – 6 Apr 1767	Transferred to San Pietro in Vincoli
	Mario Marefoschi	12 Dec 1770 – 23 Dec 1780	Died
	Paolo Massei	11 Apr 1785 – 9 Jun 1785	Died
	Diego Innico Caracciolo	20 Oct 1800 – 24 Jan 1820	Died
	Cesare Brancadoro	29 May 1820 – 12 Sept 1837	Died
	Friedrich, Prince of Schwarzenberg	27 Jan 1842 – 27 Mar 1885	Died
	Antolín Monescillo y Viso	10 Jun 1886 – 11 Aug 1897	Died
	Antonio María Cascajares y Azara	24 Mar 1898 – 27 Jul 1901	Died
	Sebastiano Martinelli	9 Jun 1902 – 4 Jul 1918	Died
	Aleksander Kakowski	18 Dec 1919 – 30 Dec 1938	Died
	Agustín Parrado y García	18 Feb 1946 – 8 Oct 1946	Died
	Fernando Quiroga Palacios	29 Oct 1953 – 7 Dec 1971	Died
	Marcelo González Martín	5 Mar 1973 – 25 Aug 2004	Died
	Jean-Pierre Ricard	24 Mar 2006 – present	Current cardinal-priest

== See also ==
- Category:Burials at Sant'Agostino, Rome
- Late medieval domes
- Italian Renaissance domes

Preceded by Sant'Agnese fuori le mura	Landmarks of Rome; Sant'Agostino	Succeeded by Sant'Anastasia al Palatino
