= Johannes Goritz =

Luxembourger Catholic official (1457–1527)

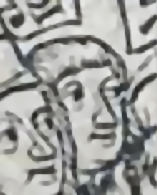
Johannes Goritz, from a woodcut by Jakob Wimpfeling, 1502.

Johannes Goritz (1457–1527), Latinised as Janus Corycius, was a Luxembourger Catholic Church official and patron of the arts.

Goritz was born in Koerich in the Duchy of Luxembourg. He graduated from Heidelberg University in 1481, and came to Rome in 1484. He obtained the position within the Roman Curia, becoming a receiver of requests and then protonotary apostolic.

Goritz commissioned a chapel in Sant'Agostino, Rome, dedicated to his patron saint Anne. This included a sculpture of Madonna with Child and Anna by Andrea Sansovino as well as a fresco of The Prophet Isaiah by Raphael. At the dedication of the chapel, a steady stream of literary friends honoured Goritz with verses that were later published in the 1524 book Coryciana. Every year on the feast of Saint Anne (July 26) Goritz would hold a banquet in the chapel.

Following the Sack of Rome in 1527 he returned home but died in Verona on the way there.
