= Pietro Gagliardi =

19th-century Italian painter

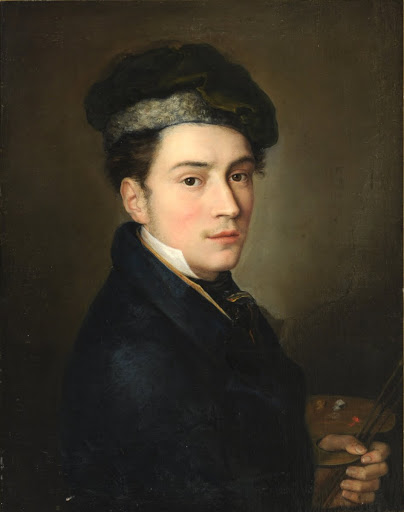
- Self-portrait painted between 1830 and 1840
- Born: 9 August 1809; Rome
- Died: 19 September 1890 (aged 81); Frascati, Lazio
- Known for: Painting

Pietro Gagliardi (9 August 1809 – 19 September 1890) was an Italian painter and architect, who decorated many churches and palaces in Rome and throughout Italy.

== Biography ==
Gagliardi was born in Rome on 9 August 1809 to Francesco (of Campania) and Angela Zucchi (of Rome). He studied architecture under Professor Francesco Lanci, but after the death of his brother Giovanni, a painter, he directed his attentions to painting. He studied in the Accademia di San Luca, including under such masters as Tommaso Minardi. He partook in school competitions, winning second place in 1827 and the medal of encouragement in 1828.

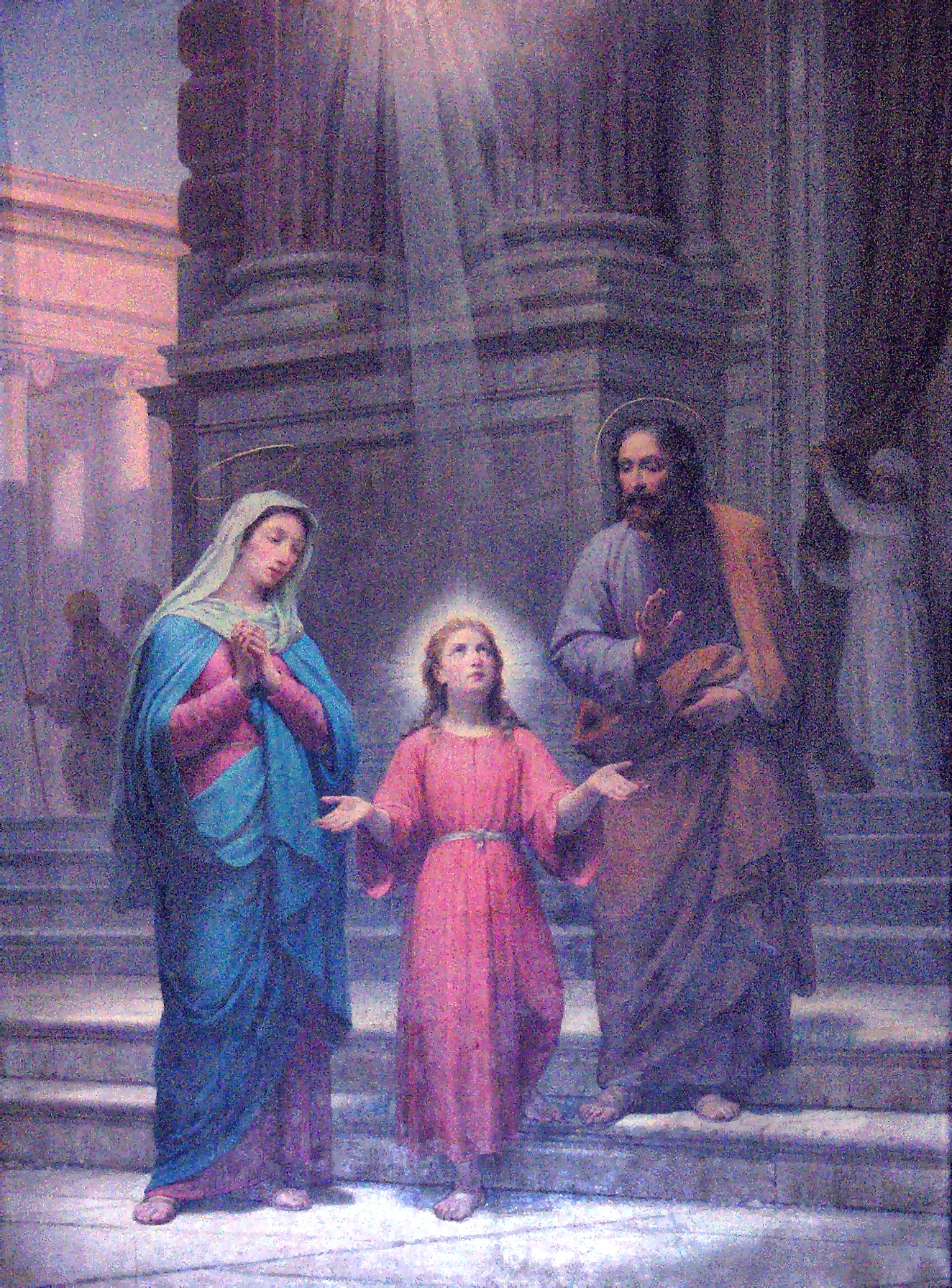
Holy Family at the Temple of Jerusalem in the Church of Sant'Eustachio in Rome

He worked primarily in Rome, and his studio was located in Palazzo Giustiniani in Piazza San Luigi dei Francesi. His first major commission dates to 1834, when he decorated the chapel of San Sebastiano in Villa Aldobrandini in Frascati for Prince Francesco Borghese Aldobrandini. By the 1840s, he had established himself as a preeminent painter of sacred art and was active in and around Rome, especially in Tarquinia, where he worked with his nephews Francesco and Giovanni. In 1847, he worked on the completion of the fresco decorations in the Church of San Girolamo dei Croati in Rome.

He continued his painting, often depicting mythological and historical themes, in other elegant residences, such as Villa Torlonia in Castel Gandolfo (in 1841); Palazzo Torlonia in Piazza Venezia (in 1842); the new section of the Casino dell'Aurora in the Palazzo Pallavicini-Rospigliosi, which was commissioned by the Prince of Piombino Antonio Boncompagni Ludovisi (from 1855 to 1858); and Palazzo Sangermano-Rappini in Arpino (in 1871). Between 1854 and 1868, he worked on the frescoed decoration of the Church of Sant'Agostino, together with his nephew Giovanni.

In 1857, he became a member of the Pontifical Academy of Fine Arts and Letters of the Virtuosi al Pantheon, and served as president and regent several times beginning in 1888. He was also a professor at the Accademia di San Luca, and in 1870 he was a member of the commission for painting at the Roman Exhibition of Catholic Art.

Gagliardi died in Frascati on 19 September 1890 and was buried alongside his family and wife, Vittoria Roscioli, in the Chapel of San Giuseppe in the Church of Sant'Agostino in Rome, which he restored and painted.

== Bibliography ==
- Carta, M. (1989). "L'attività artistica di P. G. nella chiesa di S. Girolamo" [The Artistic Activity of P. G. in the Church of San Girolamo]. In Perić, Ratko (ed.). Chiesa Sistina (1589–1989) [Sistine Chapel (1589–1989)] (in Italian). Rome. OCLC 888599344.
- Servanzi Collio, Severino (1867). Pitture a fresco del Cavaliere Pietro Gagliardi romano nella chiesa di S. Girolamo degli Schiavoni [Fresco Paintings by the Roman Knight Pietro Gagliardi in the Church of San Girolamo degli Schiavoni] (in Italian). Rome: Tip. Delle Belle Arti. OCLC 41524791.
- Ovidi, Ernesto (1902). Minardi e la sua scuola [Minardi and His School] (in Italian). Rome: Tipografia Pietro Rebecca. OCLC 964260220.
- Visconti, Carlo Ludovico (1891). Cenni biografici del prof. cav. Pietro Gagliardi nell'adunanza della insigne Congregazione artistica dei Virtuosi al Pantheon [Biographical Notes of Prof. Cav. Pietro Gagliardi at the Assembly of the Distinguished Artistic Congregation of Virtuosi al Pantheon] (in Italian). Rome: Setth. OCLC 886617726.

== See also ==
Santi Quirico e Giulitta
