= Madonna of Loreto (Perugino) =

Painting by Pietro Perugino

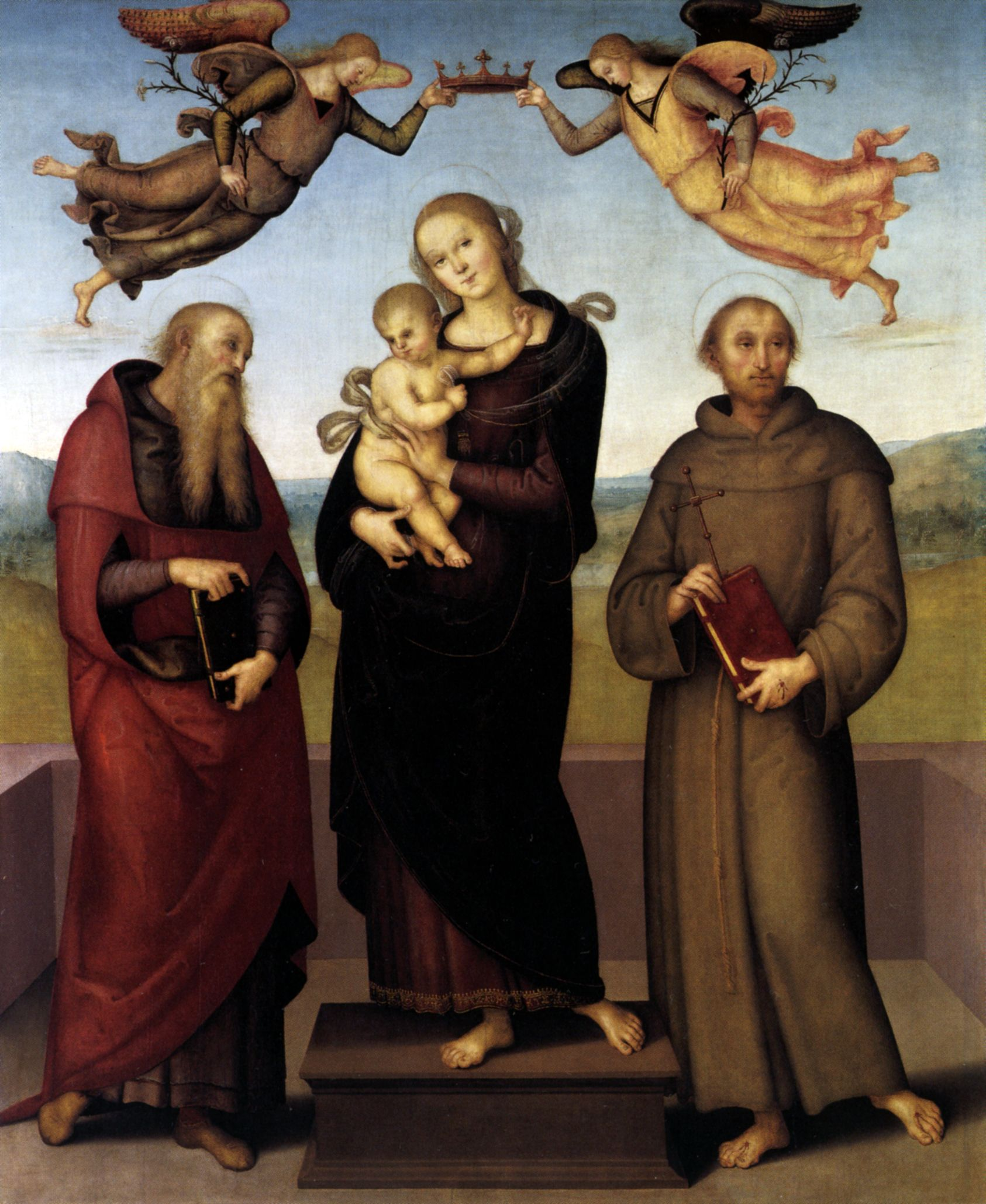
- Artist: Perugino
- Year: c.1507
- Medium: oil on panel
- Dimensions: 185,5 cm × 125,5 cm (730 in × 494 in)
- Location: National Gallery, London

The Madonna of Loreto is a c.1507 oil on panel painting by Perugino, now in the National Gallery, London, which bought it in 1879. It shows the Madonna and Child flanked by Jerome (left) and Francis of Assisi (right). Two angels hover over Mary's head holding a crown. It reuses the low parapet from Madonna and Child with St Rose and St Catherine (1492) and probably also involved the master's studio assistants.

The painting was commissioned by Giovanni di Matteo Schiavone (died 7 June 1507) for a planned chapel at Santa Maria dei Servi church in Perugia. It was delivered in September 1507. It probably originally had a predella of three small panels (Annunciation, Adoration of the Shepherds and Baptism of Christ), now in the Galleria Nazionale dell'Umbria.

== Predella ==
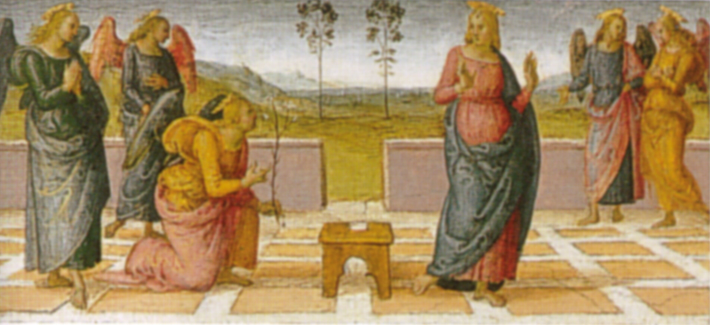
Annunciation

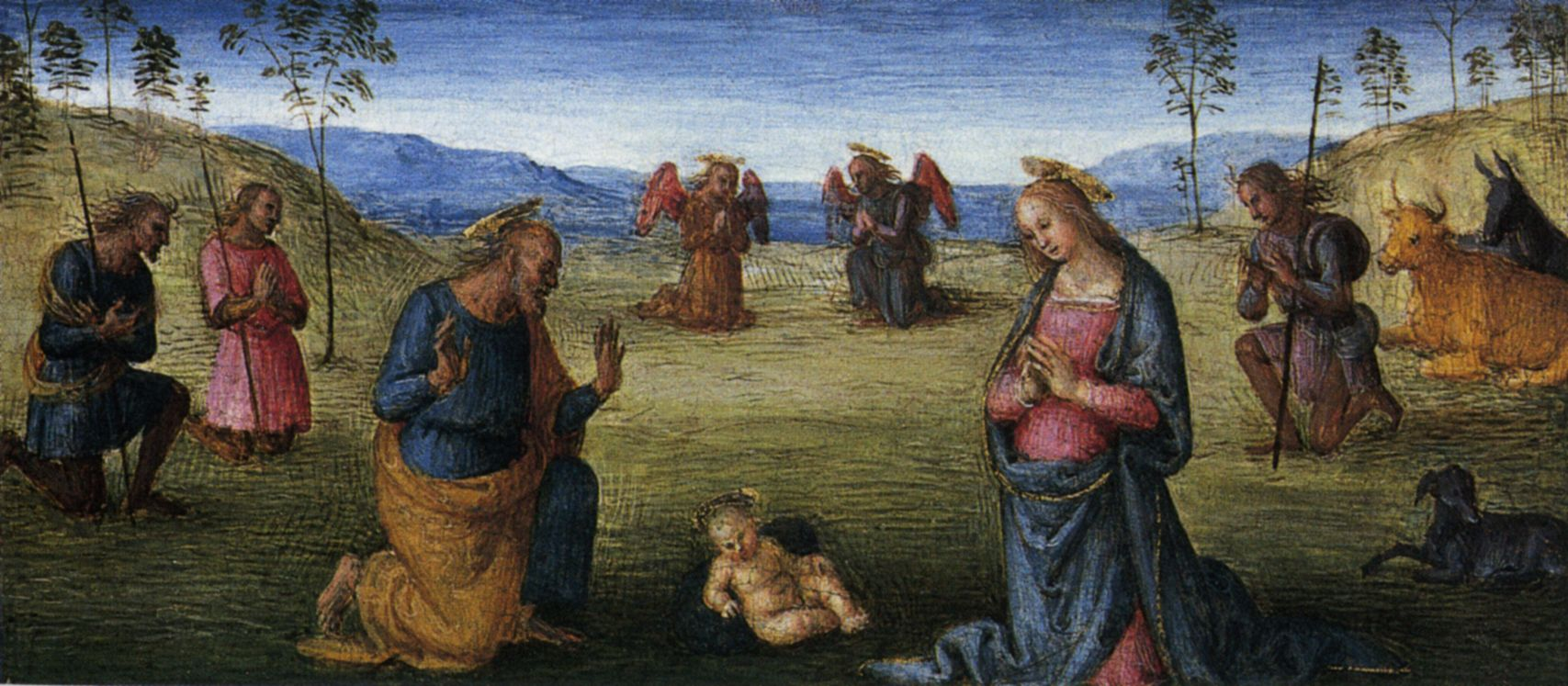
Adoration

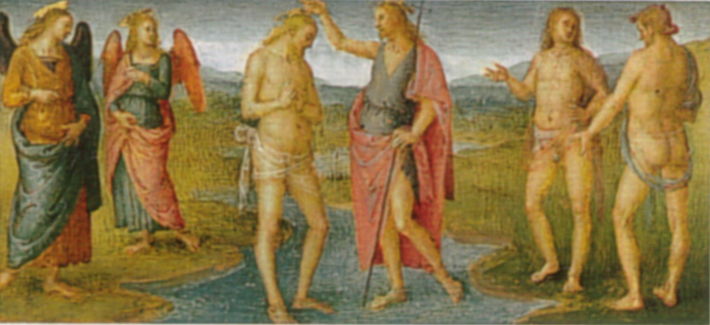
Baptism

== Bibliography ==
- https://www.nationalgallery.org.uk/research/technical-bulletin/the-madonna-di-loreto-an-altarpiece-by-perugino-for-santa-maria-dei-servi-perugia
- https://www.nationalgallery.org.uk/paintings/pietro-perugino-the-virgin-and-child-with-saints-jerome-and-francis
- (in Italian) Vittoria Garibaldi, Perugino, in Pittori del Rinascimento, Scala, Florence, 2004 ISBN 88-8117-099-X
- (in Italian) Pierluigi De Vecchi, Elda Cerchiari, I tempi dell'arte, volume 2, Bompiani, Milan, 1999 ISBN 88-451-7212-0
- (in Italian) Stefano Zuffi, Il Quattrocento, Electa, Milan, 2004 ISBN 88-370-2315-4
