= Avanzino Nucci =

Italian painter

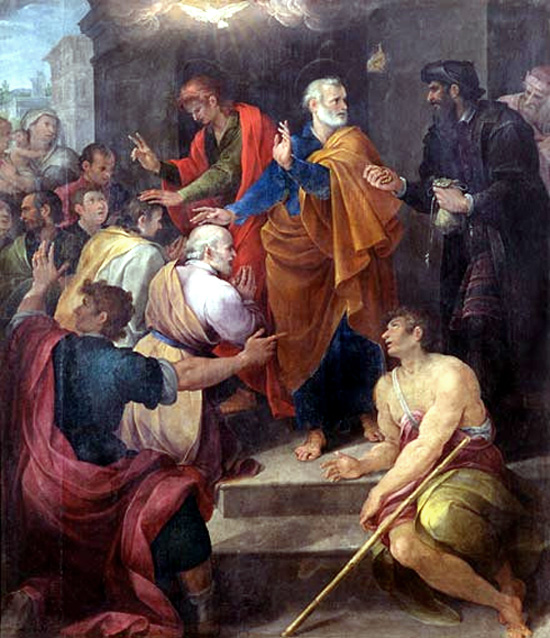
Avanzino Nucci, Peter's confrontation with Simon Magus, Oil on canvas, 1620

Avanzino Nucci (c. 1552–1629) was an Italian painter of the late-Renaissance period.

== Biography ==
He was born in Gubbio and died in Rome. He trained with Niccolò Circignani (il Pomarancio). Bernardino Gagliardi was one of his pupils. His paintings can be found in the Roman churches of San Rocco all'Augusteo, San Silvestro al Quirinale, and San Paolo fuora le Mura. Some more paintings dated 1596 are in the portico of the former Carthusian Monastery and now museum of San Martino in Naples. They depict the Foundation of the Carthusian order by St Bruno of Cologne, the Approval of the order by the Pope Urban II and the Meeting of the Saint with the Norman king Roger I of Sicily.

He is said to have painted in the church of the Annunziata (1627) and in the church of San Benedetto (1620) in Gualdo Tadino.
