= Madonna di Loreto (Caravaggio) =

Painting by Caravaggio

Madonna of Loreto
- Madonna dei pellegrini (Italian)
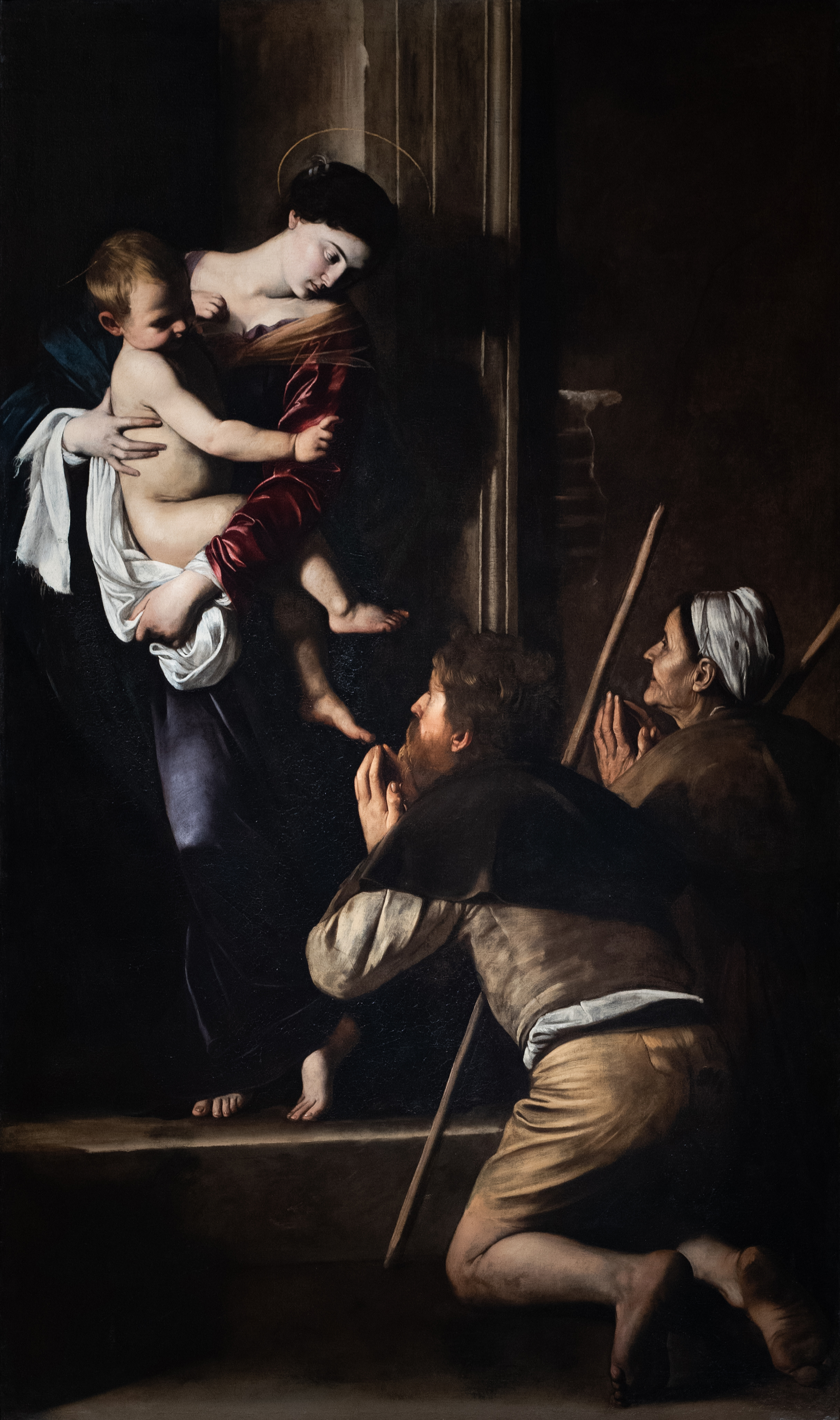
- Artist: Caravaggio
- Year: c. 1604–1606
- Medium: Oil on canvas
- Dimensions: 260 cm × 150 cm (100 in × 59 in)
- Location: Sant'Agostino, Rome

The Madonna di Loreto or Pilgrims' Madonna is a painting created c.1604–1606 by the Italian Baroque master Caravaggio, located in the Cavalletti Chapel of the church of Sant'Agostino, just northeast of the Piazza Navona in Rome. It depicts the barefoot Virgin holding her naked child in a doorway before two kneeling peasants on a pilgrimage.

In 1603 the heirs of marquis Ermete Cavalletti, who had died on 21 July 1602, commissioned a painting on the theme of the Madonna of Loreto to decorate a family chapel. As instructed by the marquis's will, the Cavaletti's purchased a chapel in the church of Sant'Agostino in Rome on 4 September 1603.

The painter Giovanni Baglione, a competitor who had successfully ensured Caravaggio was jailed during a libel trial, said that the unveiling of this painting "caused the common people to make a great cackle (schiamazzo) over it". The uproar was not surprising. The Virgin Mary, like her admiring pilgrims, is barefoot. The doorway or niche is not an exalted cumulus or bevy of putti, but a partly decrepit wall of flaking brick. Only a slim halo indicates her saintly status. While beautiful, the Virgin Mary could be any woman emerging from the shadows. Like many of Caravaggio's Roman paintings, such as the Conversion on the Way to Damascus or the Calling of St Matthew, the scene is a moment where an ordinary person encounters the divine, whose appearance is equally ordinary. The woman modelling Mary appears to be the same as that in Caravaggio's canvas in the Galleria Borghese: The Madonna and Child with St. Anne (Dei Palafrenieri) (1605).

Critic Robert Hughes has stated:

…his [Caravaggio’s] project was to give traditional motifs the immediacy of real life, rather than dignify the actual with fragments of the Classical. And once there was a perfect standoff between the two: this Madonna [di Loreto], leaning very elegantly against a pilaster with those two wrinkled and almost incongruously and devout plebians adoring her. Compared to the pilgrims, the Madonna looks wooden; but perhaps she was meant to since the cult of the shrine of the Madonna at Loreto centered around a miraculous statue of the Virgin Mary which, like a benevolent female version of Mozart’s Commendatore, was said to come alive when venerated.

It has been suggested that Caravaggio's composition is at least in part derived from a detail of a 1574 engraving, Adoration of the Magi, after Rosso Fiorentino, by Caravaggio's friend Cherubino Alberti (1553–1615).

== See also ==
- List of paintings by Caravaggio
