= Andrea Sansovino =

Italian sculptor

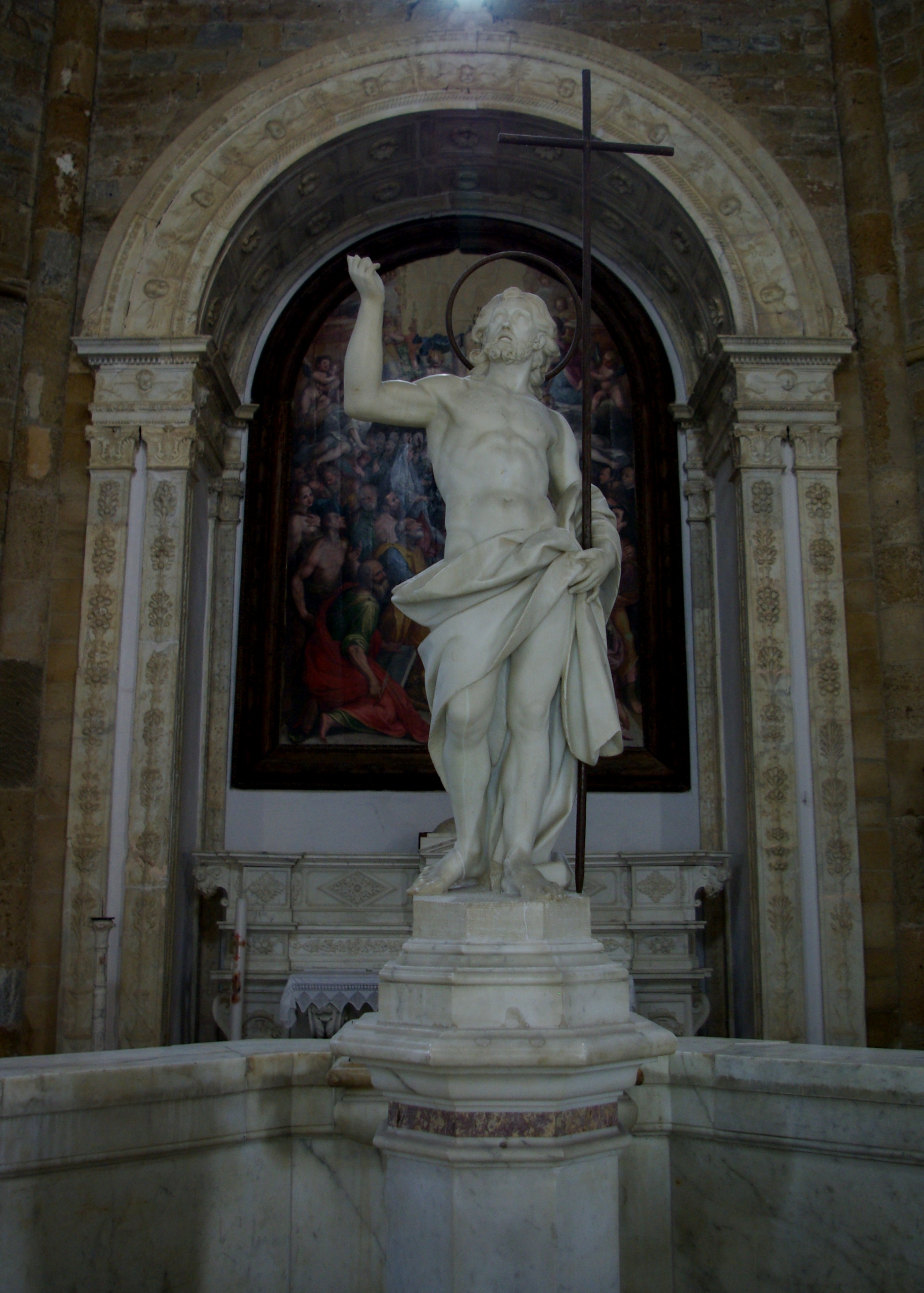
John the Baptist, Baptistery of San Giovanni in Volterra

Andrea dal Monte Sansovino or Andrea Contucci del Monte San Savino (c. 1467 – 1529) was an Italian sculptor active during the High Renaissance. His pupils include Jacopo Sansovino (no relation).

== Biography ==
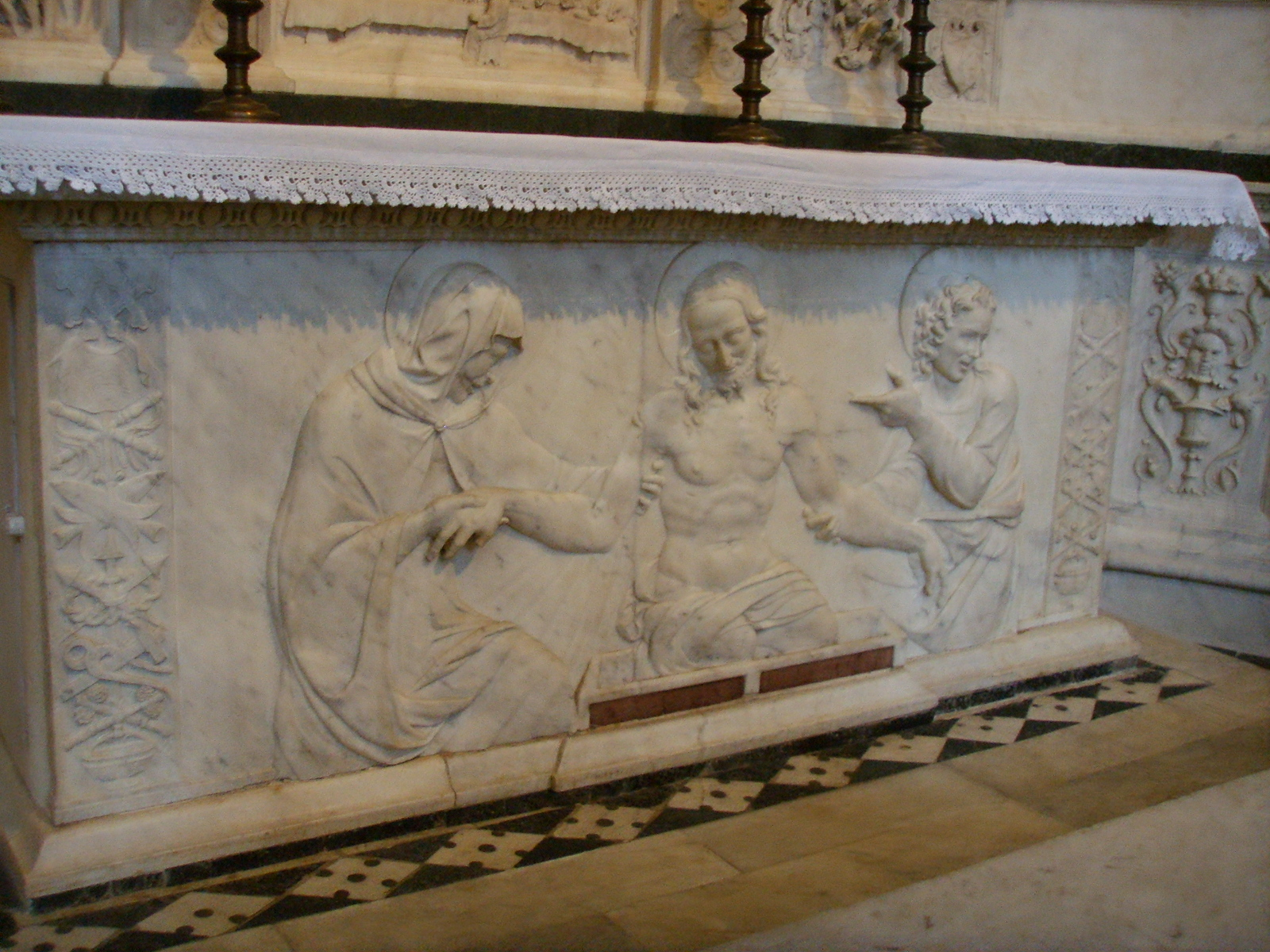
Altar front, Santo Spirito

He was the son of Domenico Contucci of Monte Sansovino and was born at Monte San Savino near Arezzo, hence his name, which is usually softened to Sansovino.

He was a pupil of Antonio del Pollaiuolo, and at first, worked in the style of 15th-century Florence. His early works are the terra cotta altarpiece in Santa Chiara at Monte San Savino, the marble reliefs of the Annunciation, the Coronation of the Virgin, a Pietà, the Last Supper, and various statuettes in the Corbinelli Chapel of Santo Spirito at Florence, all executed between the years 1488 and 1491.

From 1493 to 1500 Andrea worked in Portugal for the king, and some pieces of sculpture by him still exist in the monastic church of Coimbra. These early reliefs strongly show the influence of Donatello. His first known works after his return to Rome are a Madonna and a Baptist in Genoa Cathedral. The beginning of a more pagan style is shown in the St. John Baptizing Christ statues over the east door of the Battistero di San Giovanni in Florence (1505). This group was, however, finished by the weaker hand of Vincenzo Danti. In this period he executed the marble font at Volterra, with good reliefs of the Four Virtues and the Baptism of Christ.

In 1504 Sansovino was invited to Rome by Pope Julius II to make the monument of Cardinal Manzi in Santa Maria in Aracoeli (influenced by the Lombard style of Andrea Bregno) and those of the Cardinals Ascanio Maria Sforza and Girolamo Basso della Rovere for the retro-choir of Santa Maria del Popolo. The architectural parts of these monuments and their sculptured foliage are extremely graceful and executed with the most minute delicacy, but the recumbent effigies show the beginning of a serious decline in taste. These tombs became models which for many years were copied by most later sculptors with increasing exaggerations of their defects.

In 1512, while still in Rome, Sansovino executed a very beautiful group of the Madonna and Child with St. Anne, now over one of the side altars in the church of Sant'Agostino. From 1513 to 1528 he was at Loreto, where he cased the outside of the Santa Casa in white marble, covered with reliefs and statuettes in niches between engaged columns; a small part of this sculpture was the work of Andrea, but the greater part was executed by Raffaello da Montelupo, Tribolo and others of his assistants and pupils. Though the general effect is rich and magnificent, the individual pieces of sculpture are both dull and feeble. The earlier reliefs, those by Sansovino himself, are the best.

== Works ==
Andrea Sansovino

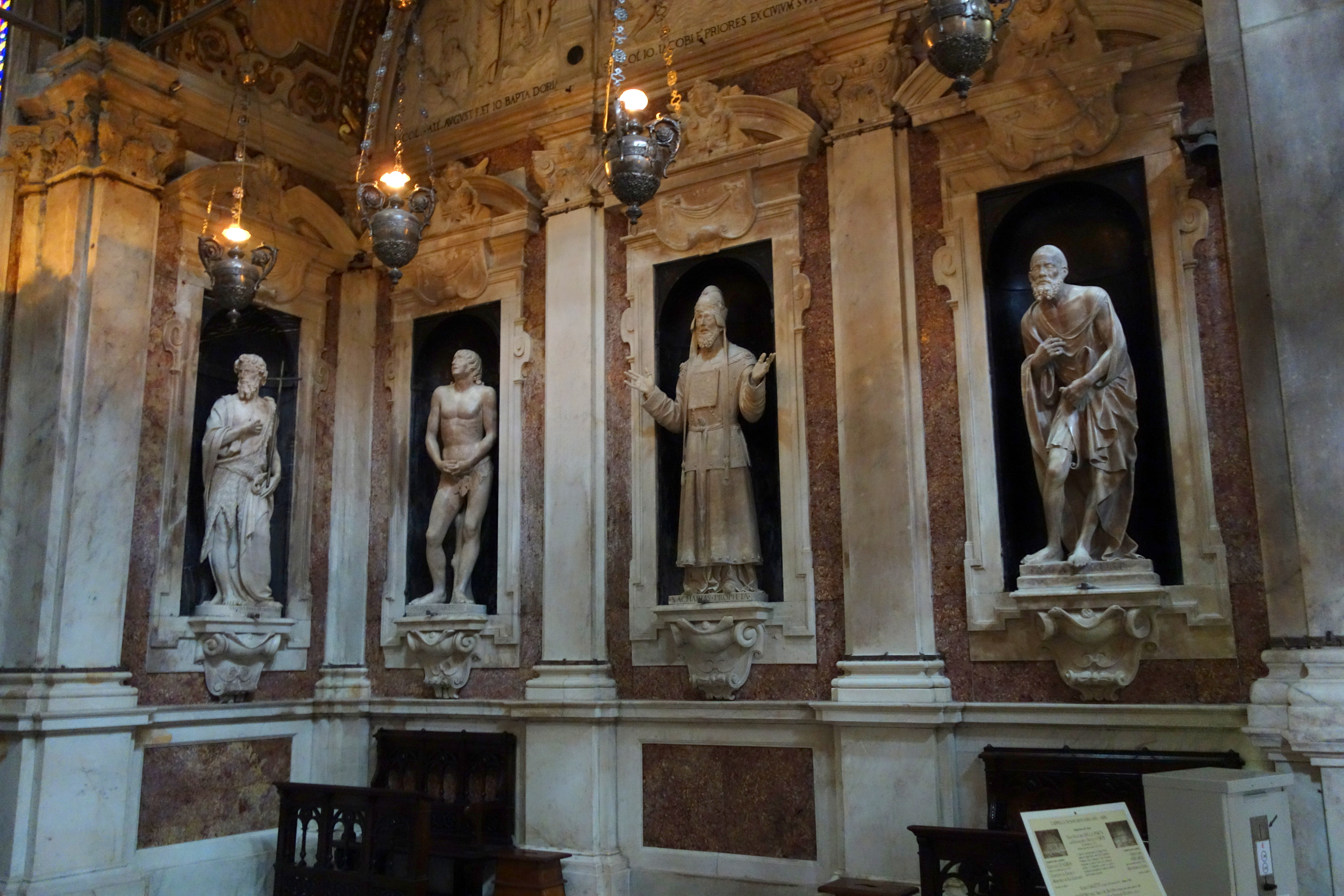
St. John the Baptist by Andrea Sansovino, early 1500s, (Adam, Zaccariah, and Habakkuk, by Matteo Cividali)

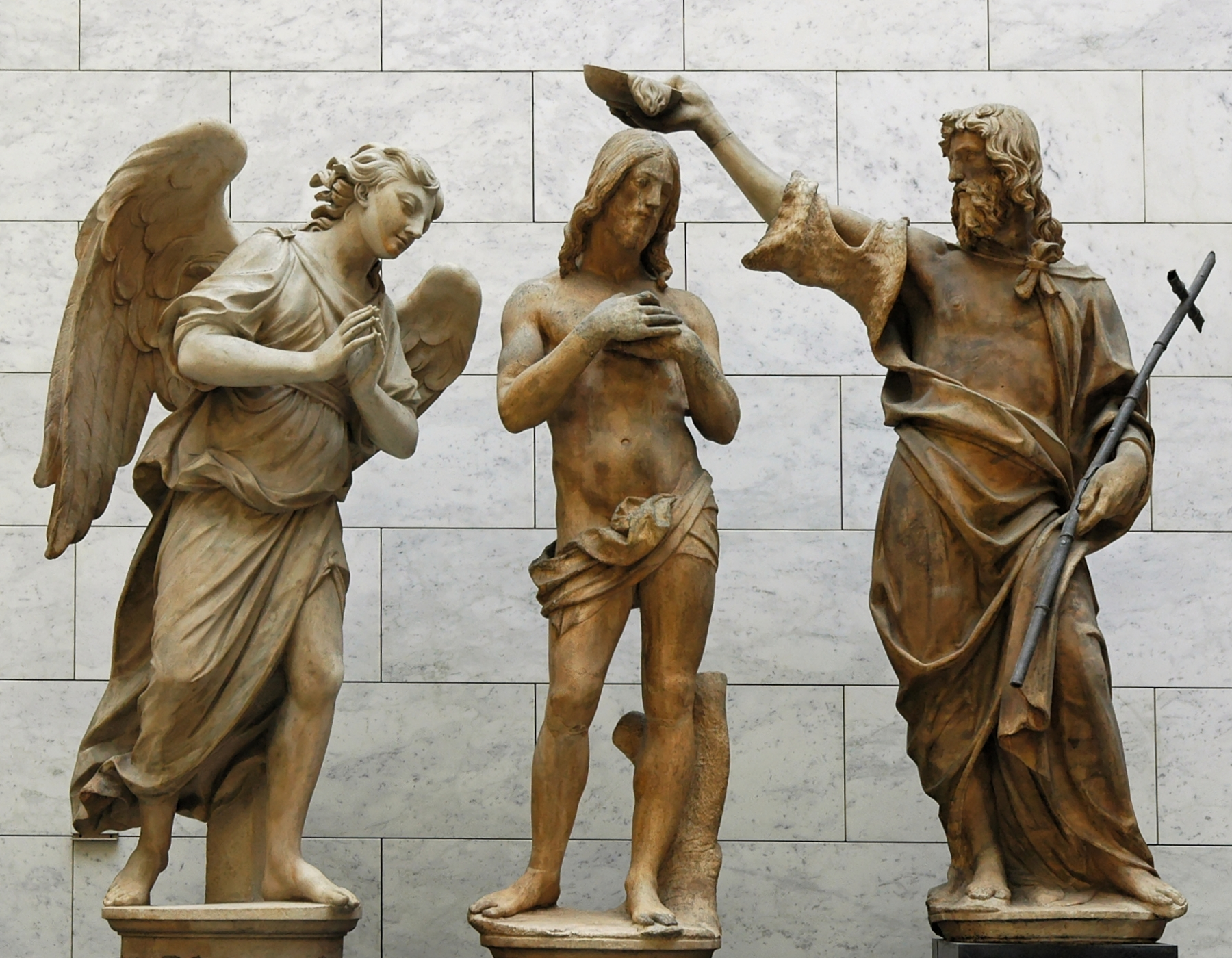
Baptism Christ, Battistero di San Giovanni,

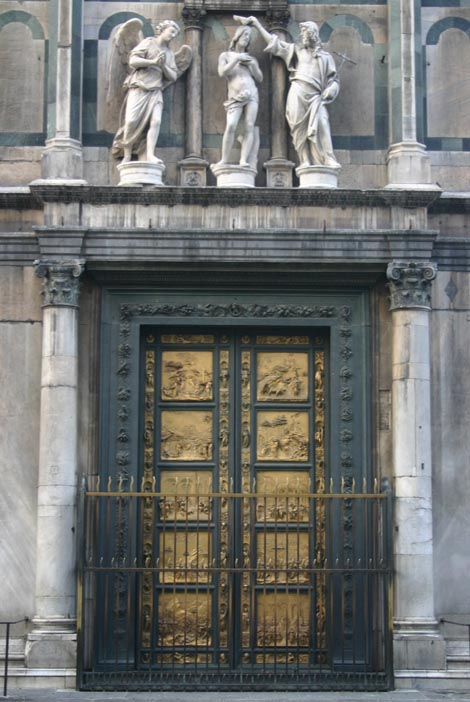
The Gates of Paradise, Battistero di San Giovanni,

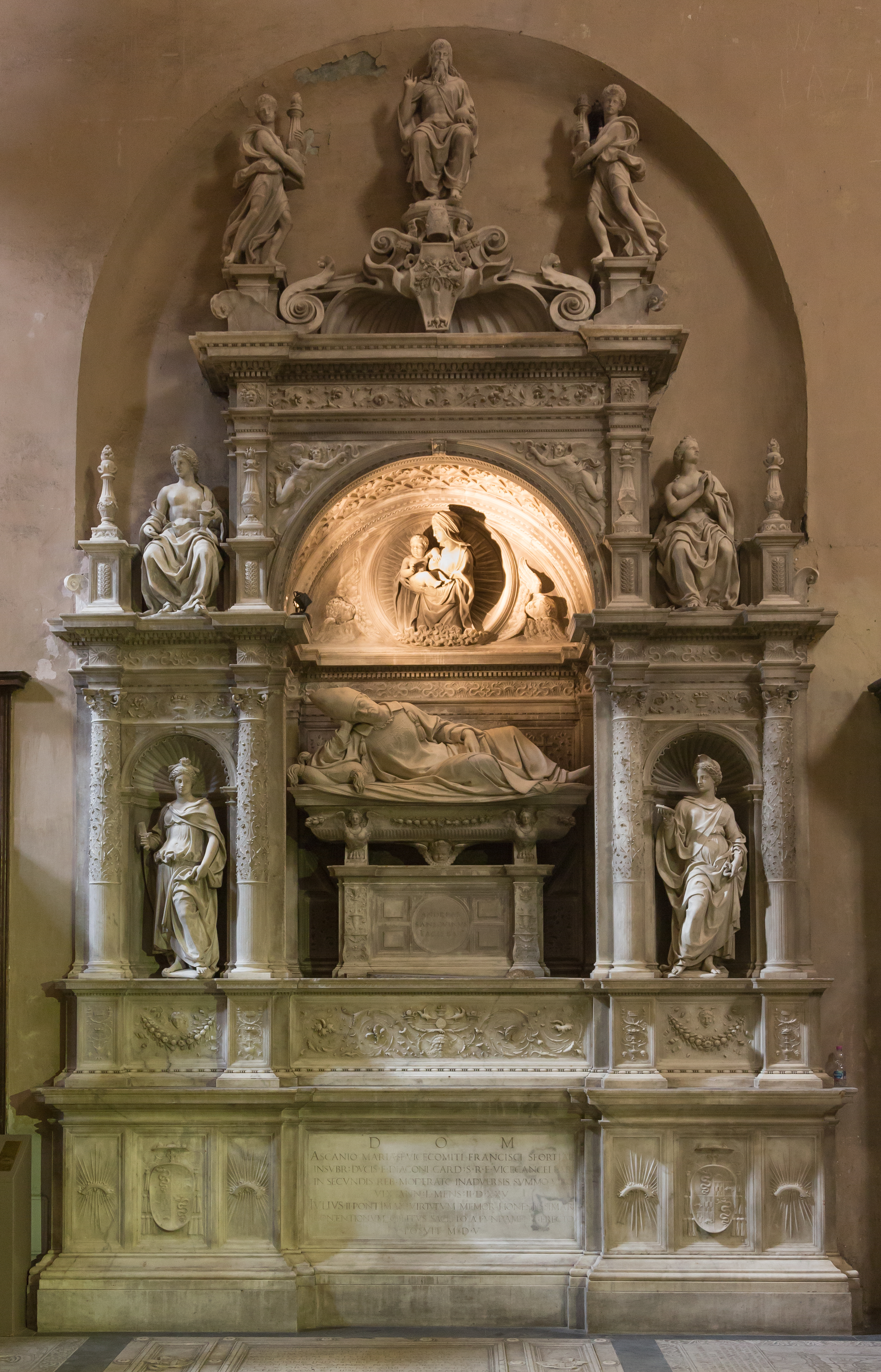
Ascanio Sforza's tomb

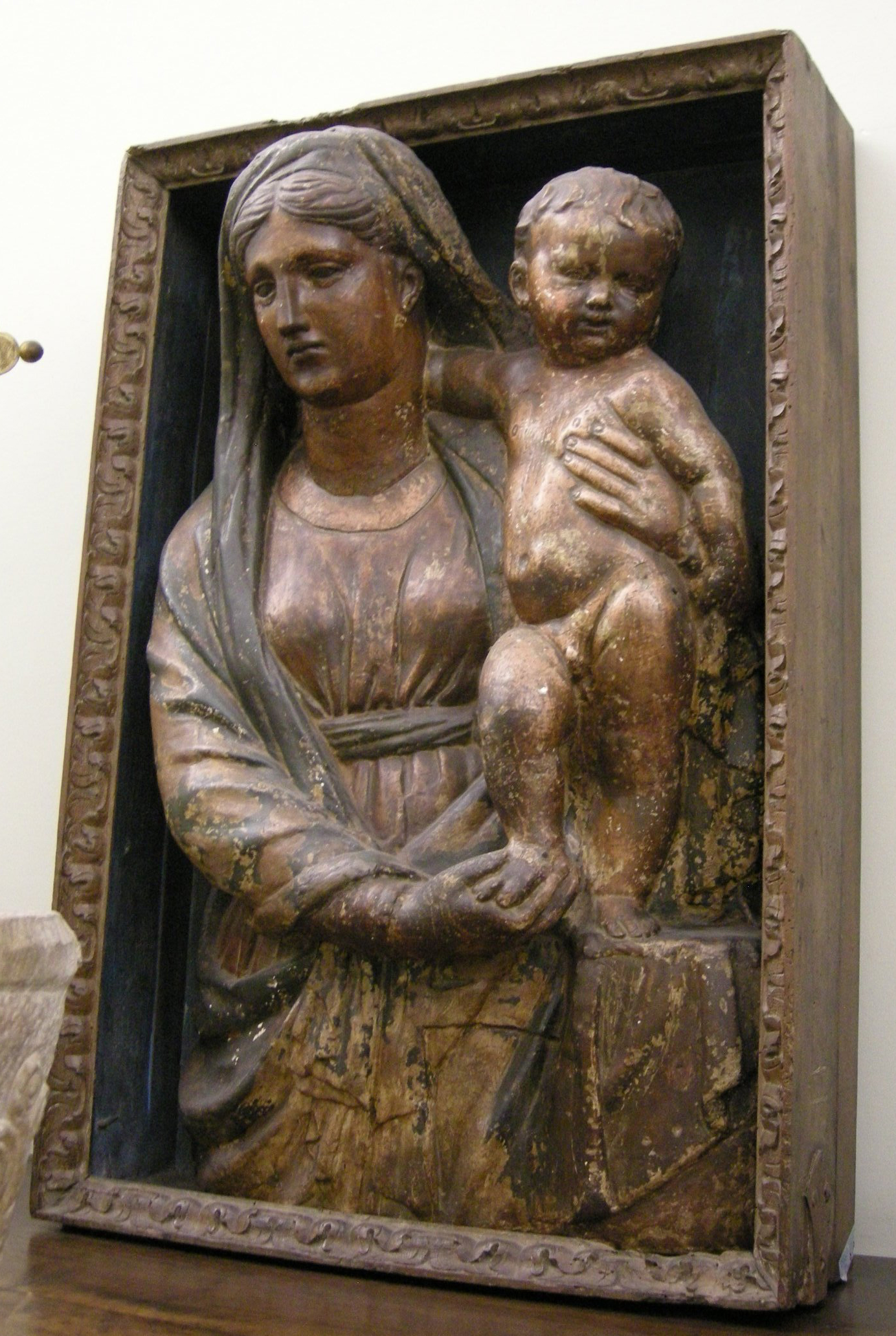
Madonna col bambino

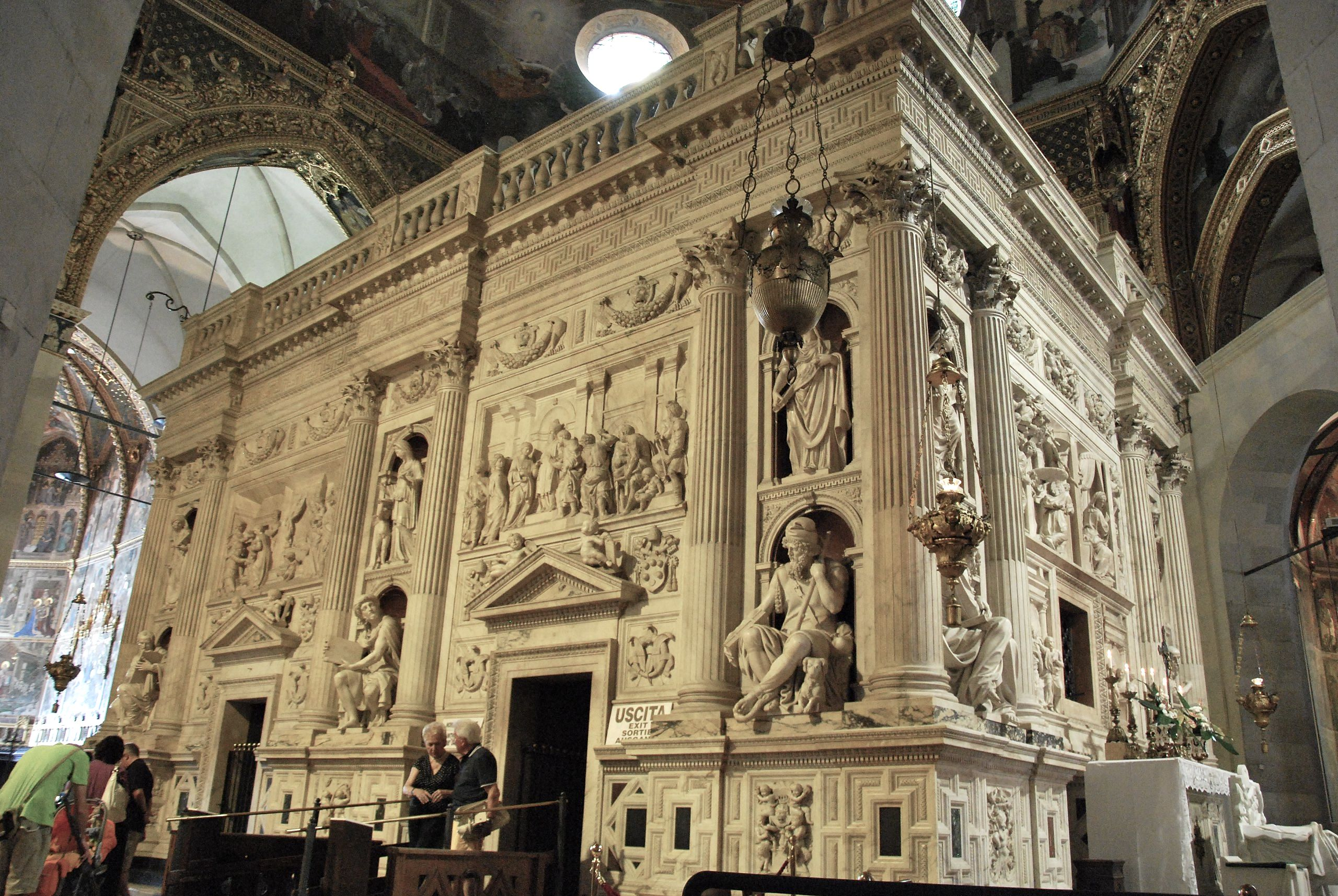
