= Narbonne Cathedral =

Catholic cathedral in Narbonne, Aude, France

Cathedral of Saints Justus and Pastor of Narbonne Cathédrale Saint-Just-et-Saint-Pasteur de Narbonne (in French)
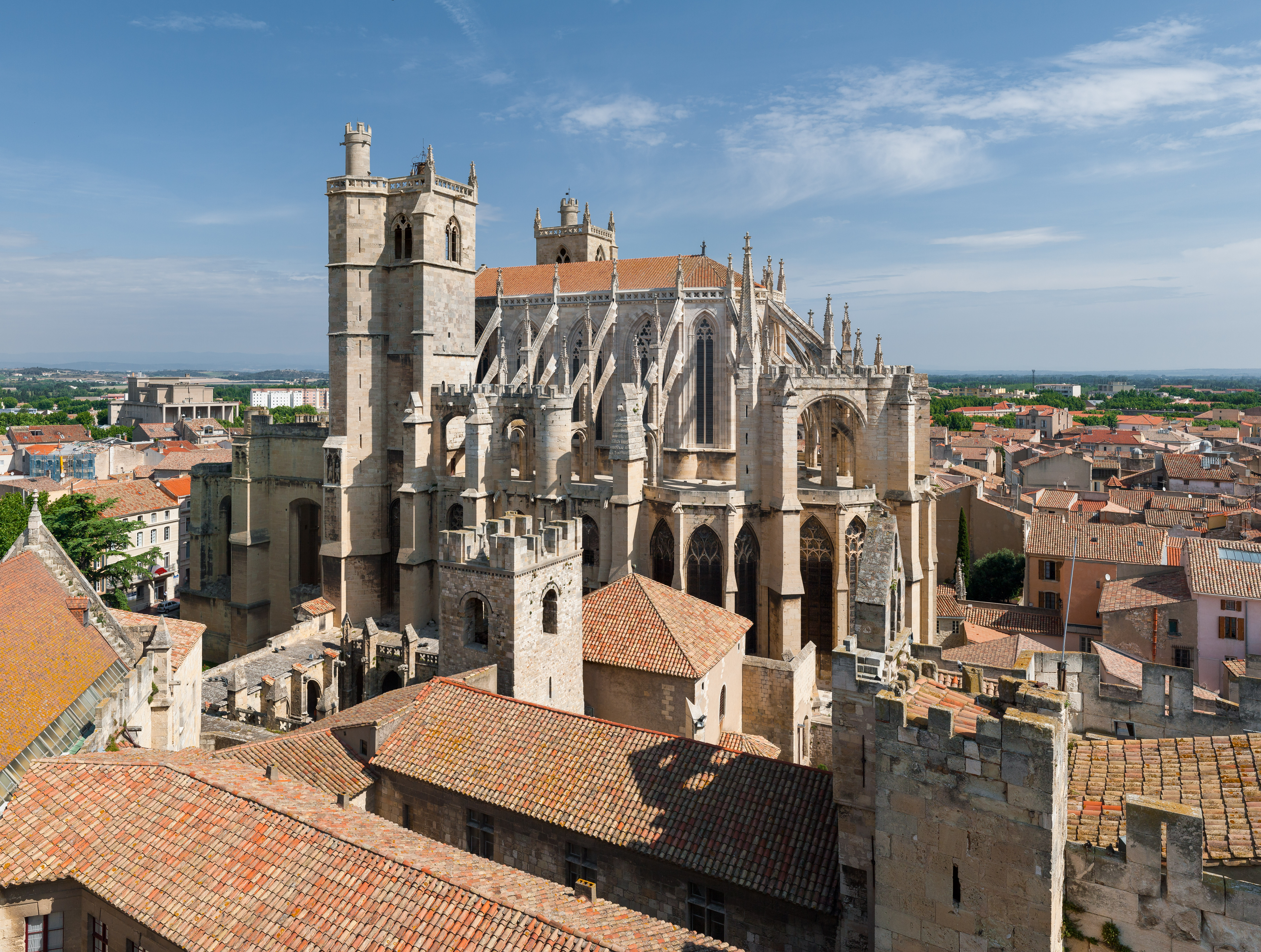
- Narbonne Cathedral, seen from the Gilles Aycelin donjon

Religion
- Affiliation: Roman Catholic Church
- Province: Diocese of Carcassonne-Narbonne
- Rite: Roman
- Ecclesiastical or organisational status: Cathedral

Location
- Location: Narbonne, Aude, France
- Interactive map of Cathedral of Saints Justus and Pastor of Narbonne; Cathédrale Saint-Just-et-Saint-Pasteur de Narbonne (in French)
- Coordinates: 43°11′5″N 3°0′14″E

Architecture
- Type: Church
- Style: Gothic
- Groundbreaking: 13th century

Narbonne Cathedral (Cathédrale Saint-Just-et-Saint-Pasteur de Narbonne) is a Roman Catholic church located in the town of Narbonne, France. The cathedral is dedicated to Saints Justus and Pastor. In 1840 the French government declared it a monument historique.

It was the seat of the Archbishop of Narbonne until the Archbishopric was merged into the Diocese of Carcassonne under the Concordat of 1801. (The title, however, passed to the Archbishop of Toulouse.) The church was declared a minor basilica in 1886. It has been co-cathedral of the Diocese of Carcassonne and Narbonne since 2006.

The building, begun in 1272, is noted for being unfinished.

== History ==
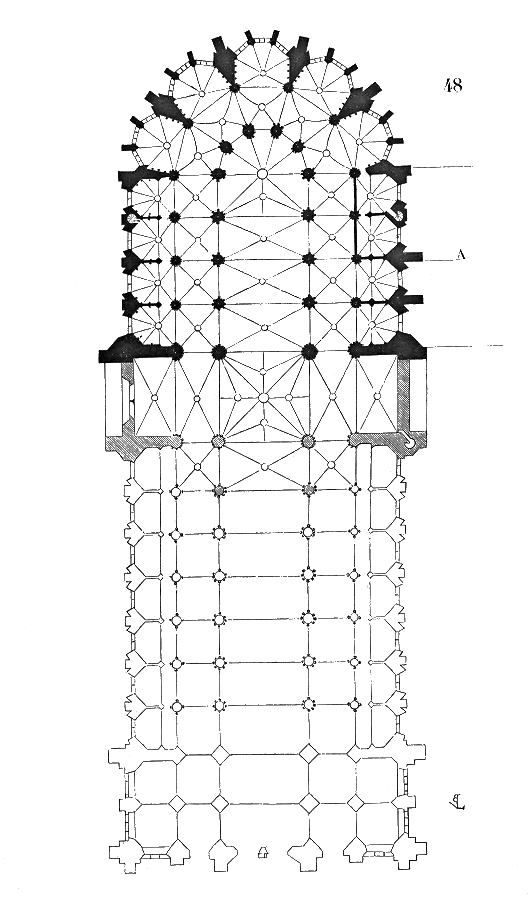
Plan by Viollet-le-Duc, showing in black the actual structure and in grey his suggestion of some of the areas not built

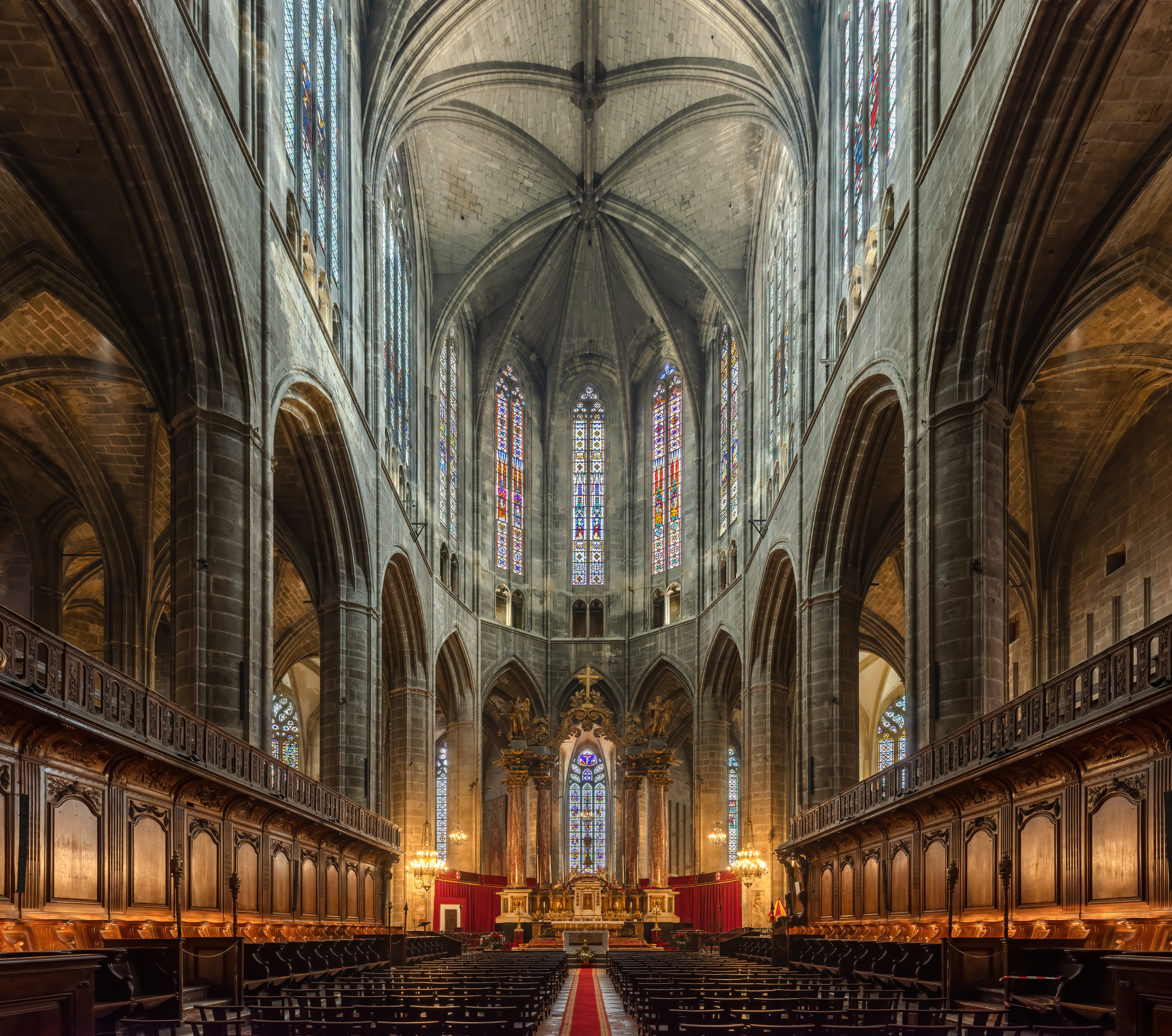
Interior

The origins of the cathedral date to 313, when a small Constantinian basilica was erected on approximately the same spot as the present cathedral shortly after the Edict of Milan. Destroyed by fire in 441, it took 37 days to demolish those parts of the basilica that had escaped destruction. Then a basilica in the Roman style was constructed by Bishop Rusticus, who was encouraged in his work by the Gaulish prefect, Marcellus. The basilica was finished on 29 November 445. Originally dedicated to Saint Genesius of Arles, it was re-dedicated in 782 to the young Spanish martyrs Saints Justus and Pastor. Little remains of this building: two Roman columns from the former forum, used in the nave, can be seen in the present cloister; the lintel and an aedicule of white marble are displayed in the Lapidary Museum of Narbonne.The 5th-century building deteriorated to a ruin, and a Carolingian cathedral was erected in its place beginning in 890 by Archbishop Theodard (d. 893). The 9th-century steeple, largely restored, is visible from the cloister.

In 1268, Pope Clement IV, a former archbishop of Narbonne, decided to build a Gothic cathedral, adopting in the style of the Kingdom of France that aligned with his political allegiance. The first stone of this cathedral was laid by Archbishop Maruin on 13 April 1272, in the foundation of the current Chapel of the Sacred Heart, and the construction continued under the direction of Jean Deschamps. The building opened in 1286 and was gradually expanded until 1354, when the location of the city walls prevented its further expansion and the nave and transept were never completed.
