= Rodez Cathedral =

Cathedral in Occitania, France

- Cathédrale Notre-Dame de Rodez
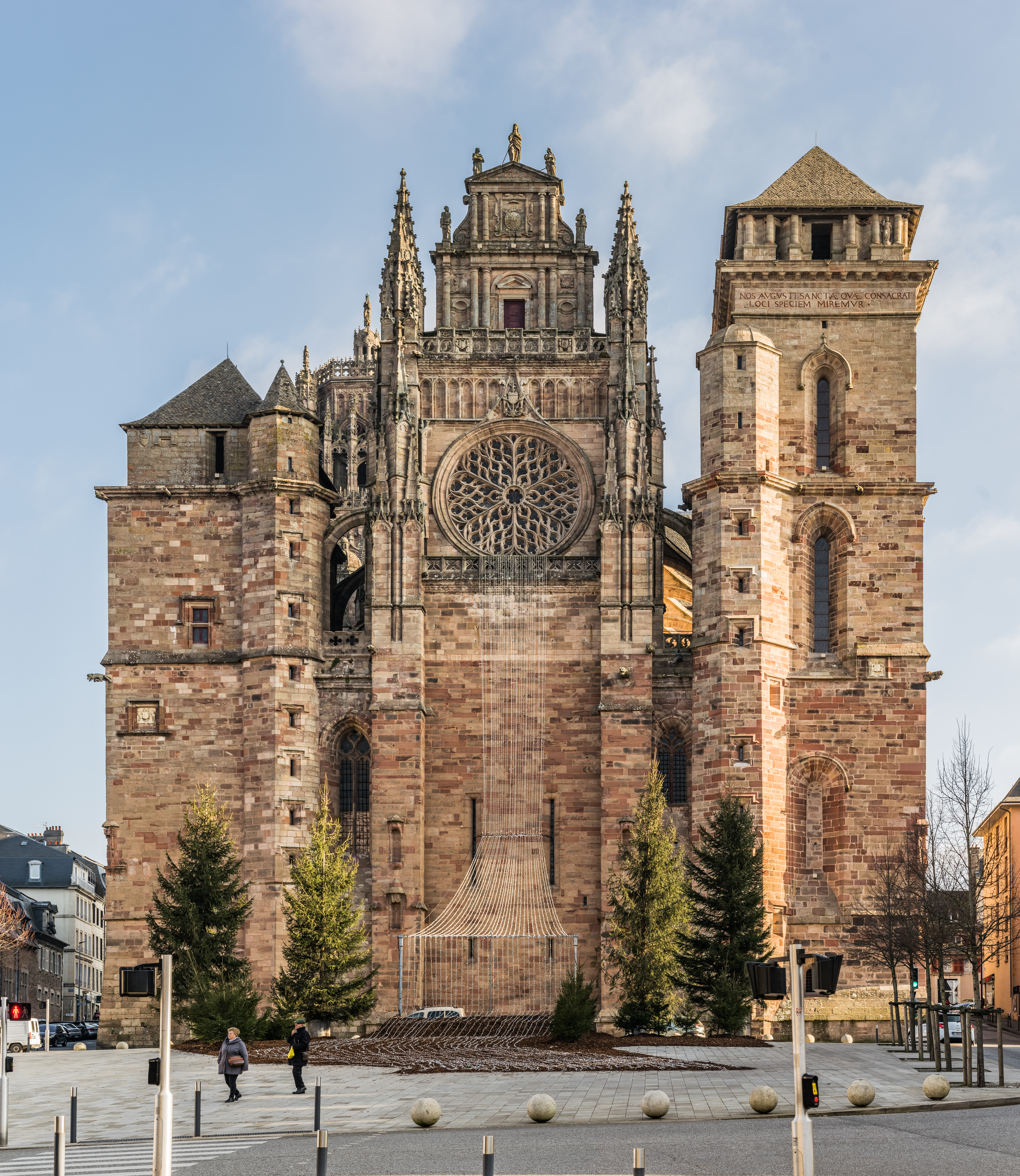
- Rodez Cathedral, west front in 2019
- Rodez Cathedral
- 44°21′03″N 2°34′26″E
- Location: Rodez, France
- Denomination: Roman Catholic Church
- Churchmanship: Roman

History
- Status: Cathedral

Architecture
- Functional status: Active
- Architectural type: Church
- Style: Gothic, Gothic Revival
- Groundbreaking: 1277; 749 years ago
- Completed: 1580; 446 years ago

Specifications
- Height: 87 m (285 ft 5 in)
- Materials: Stone

Administration
- Province: Rodez

Monument historique
- Official name: Cathédrale Notre-Dame de Rodez
- Type: Classé
- Designated: 1862
- Reference no.: PA00094108

Rodez Cathedral (French: Cathédrale Notre-Dame de Rodez) is a Roman Catholic church located in Rodez, in the department of Aveyron in the Occitania region of Southern France. The cathedral is a national monument and is the seat of the Bishopric of Rodez. The west front, of a military appearance and without a portal, formerly was part of the city wall of Rodez. Notable elements include a Flamboyant Gothic and Renaissance tower (16th century), and a Renaissance rood screen and choir stalls (15th century). The cathedral is said to have influenced the construction of other major European Gothic cathedrals, most notably St. Vitus Cathedral in Prague.

== History ==
Rodez was fully christianized during the 5th century AD, and the first mention of a simple basilica-like church on the grounds of the current structure dates from the Merovingian period around the 6th century, constructed on the site of a Roman Pagan temple. Following the collapse of the Western Roman Empire, the church was later destroyed by Visigothic invaders before being rebuilt and reconsecrated around 506 by Sidonius Apollinaris with the translation of Amans' relics. In 516, Bishop Saint Dalmatius began constructing a cathedral on the site of the current one, dedicating it to Notre-Dame even as the site endured further invasions, including pillaging by Saracens in 725. In need of an expansion to accommodate the growing town, the cathedral was completely rebuilt as a Romanesque basilica in 1000.

On 16 February 1276, the bell tower and choir roof of the early church collapsed due to multiple structural failures and the structure was deemed a total loss. Reconstruction of the current building began on 25 May 1277, with the project led by architect Jean Deschamps who had previously worked on Clermont-Ferrand Cathedral. The cathedral's design was constructed in a Rayonnant Gothic style, influenced by Clermont-Ferrand Cathedral and Limoges Cathedral, visible in features such as the blind arcades of the triforium and the strong sense of verticality. The first four-part rib vaults of the choir were quickly installed, giving it a height of thirty meters, and the first chapel on the north side was finished in 1338. Between 1366 and 1386 a new tower was also constructed at the northeast corner of the cathedral, crowned with a spire of wood covered with lead. However, the timbers of the tower burned and destroyed the upper levels and remained unfinished for more than a century. By the early 14th century, progress advanced to the transept and the nave, although work slowed significantly due to outbreaks of Black Death in 1348 and 1460 and the disruptions of the Hundred Years' War.

In the 16th century, thanks to the efforts of Bishops Francois d'Estaing and Georges d'Armagnac who raised funds for further construction, work resumed. The vaults of the nave were finally finished, and a new tower was constructed upon the two levels of the earlier tower. The new tower, the work of the master mason Antoine Salvanh, was built between 1501 and 1529. The upper portions of the completed tower incorporated both Flamboyant Gothic features and elements of French Renaissance and Baroque architecture.

Following the French Revolution, the cathedral was closed and was used as a storage depot for gunpowder, before it was returned to the Church in the early 19th century. Between 1792 and 1798, Pierre Méchain and Jean-Baptiste Delambre used Rodez Cathedral as the central surveying point for their calculation of the circumference of the earth, which was a major contribution to the definition of the metre. Unlike other heavily targeted structures in northern and eastern France such as Reims, Rodez remained completely untouched from aerial bombing and artillery fire during World War I and World War II. In 2003, Swiss artist Stéphane Belzère was commissioned to create a set of stained glass panels.

== Plans ==
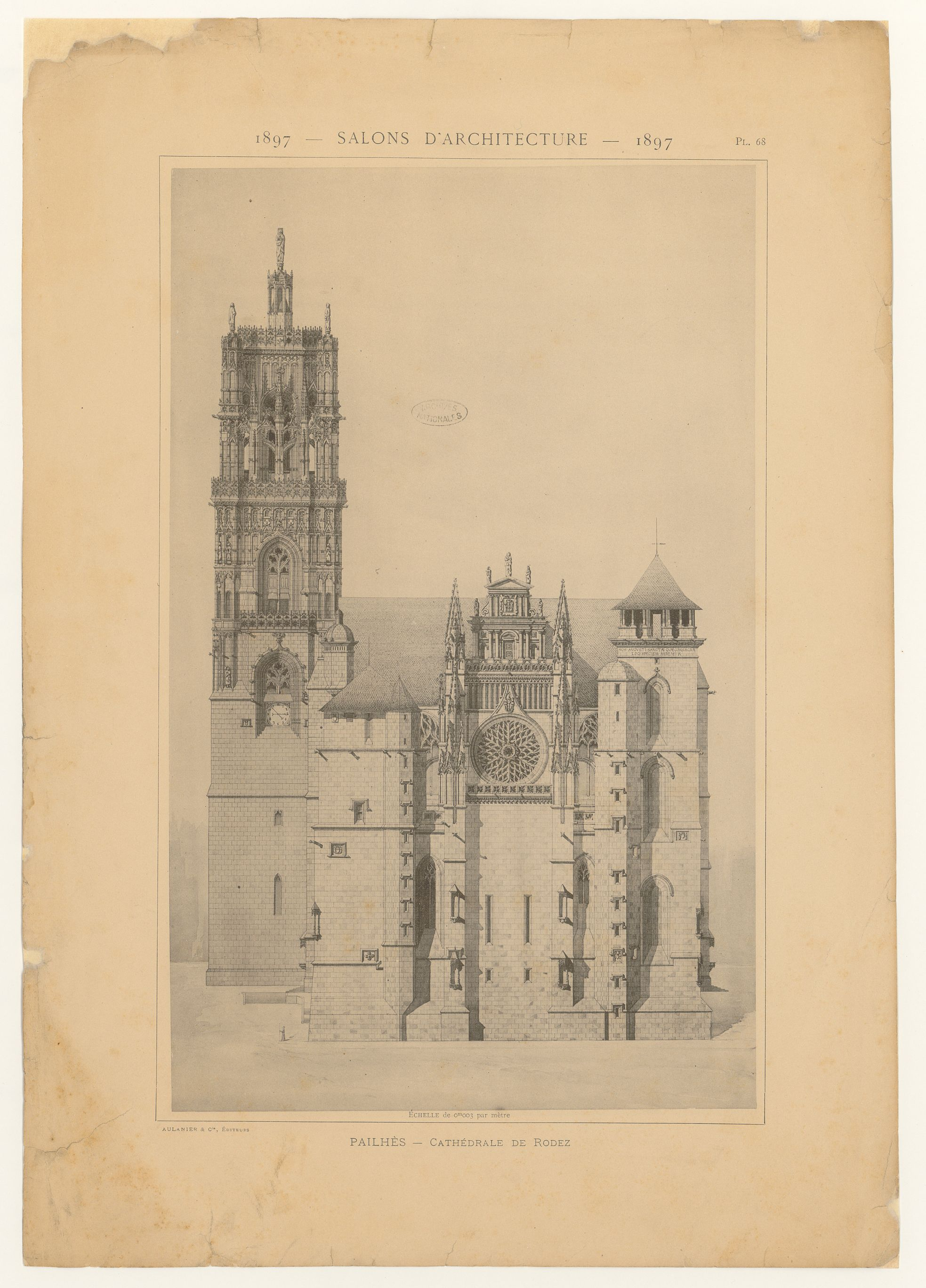
Elevation (1897)

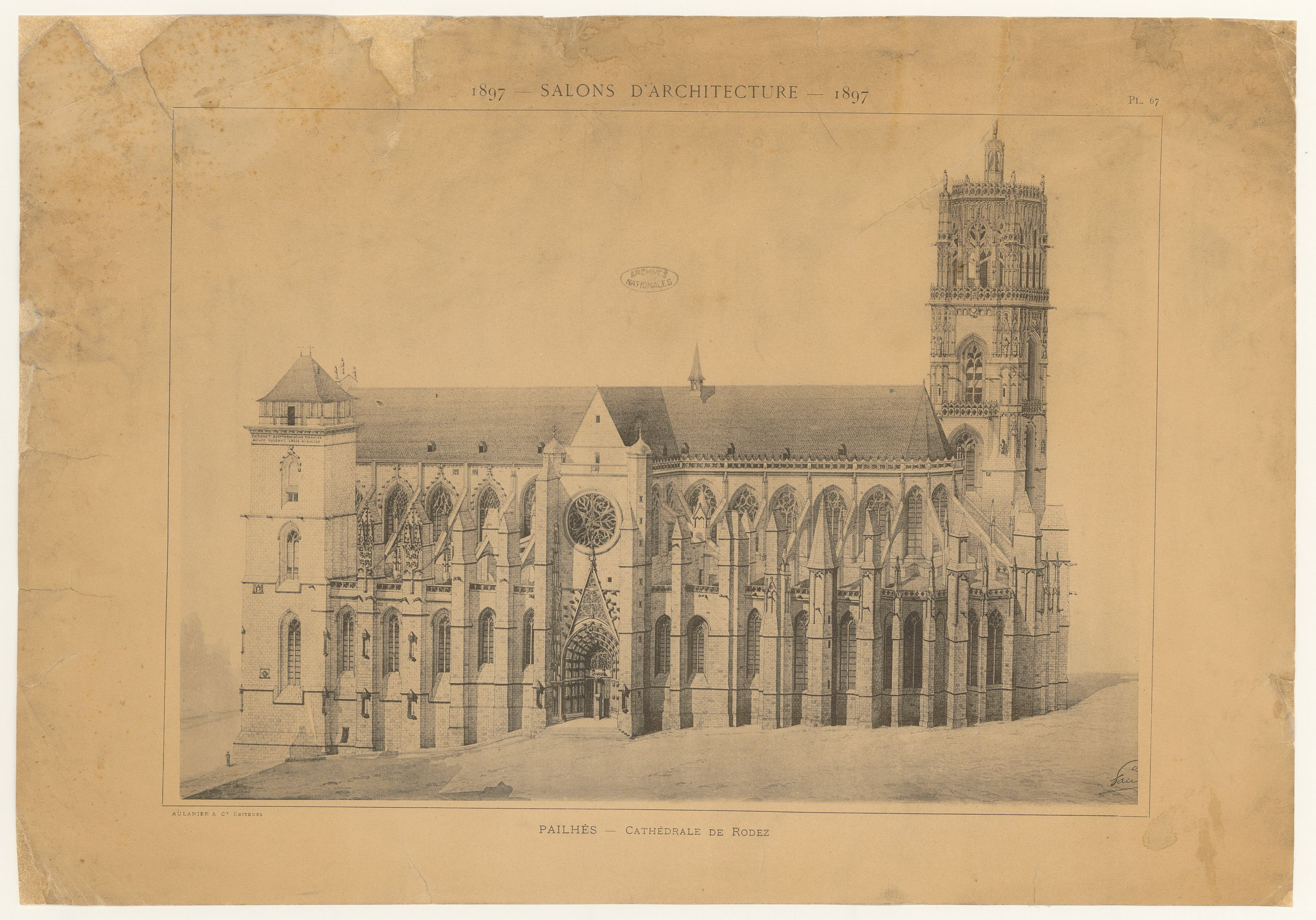
Elevation (1897 lithograph - National Archives)

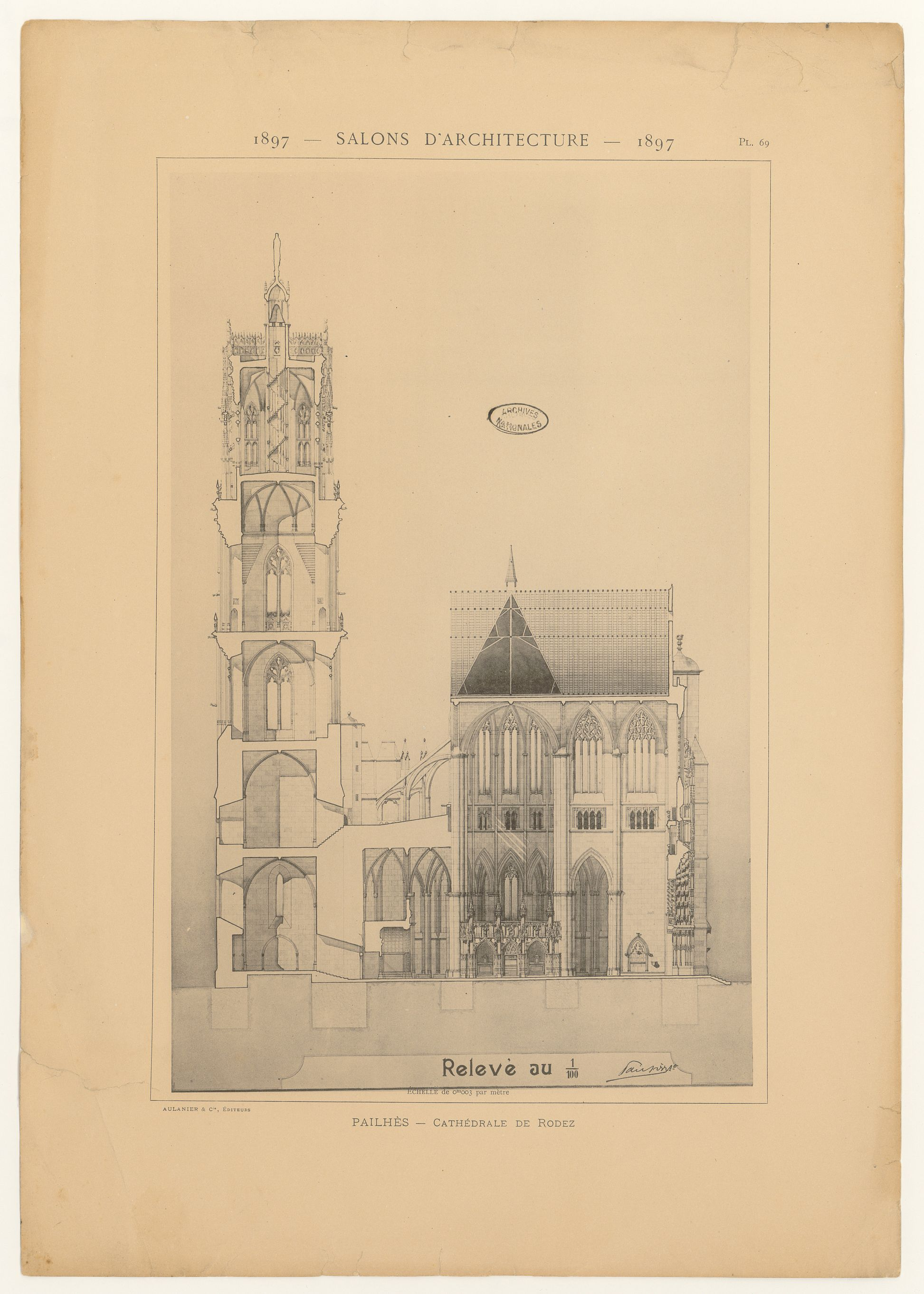
Cutaway of interior of cathedral and tower

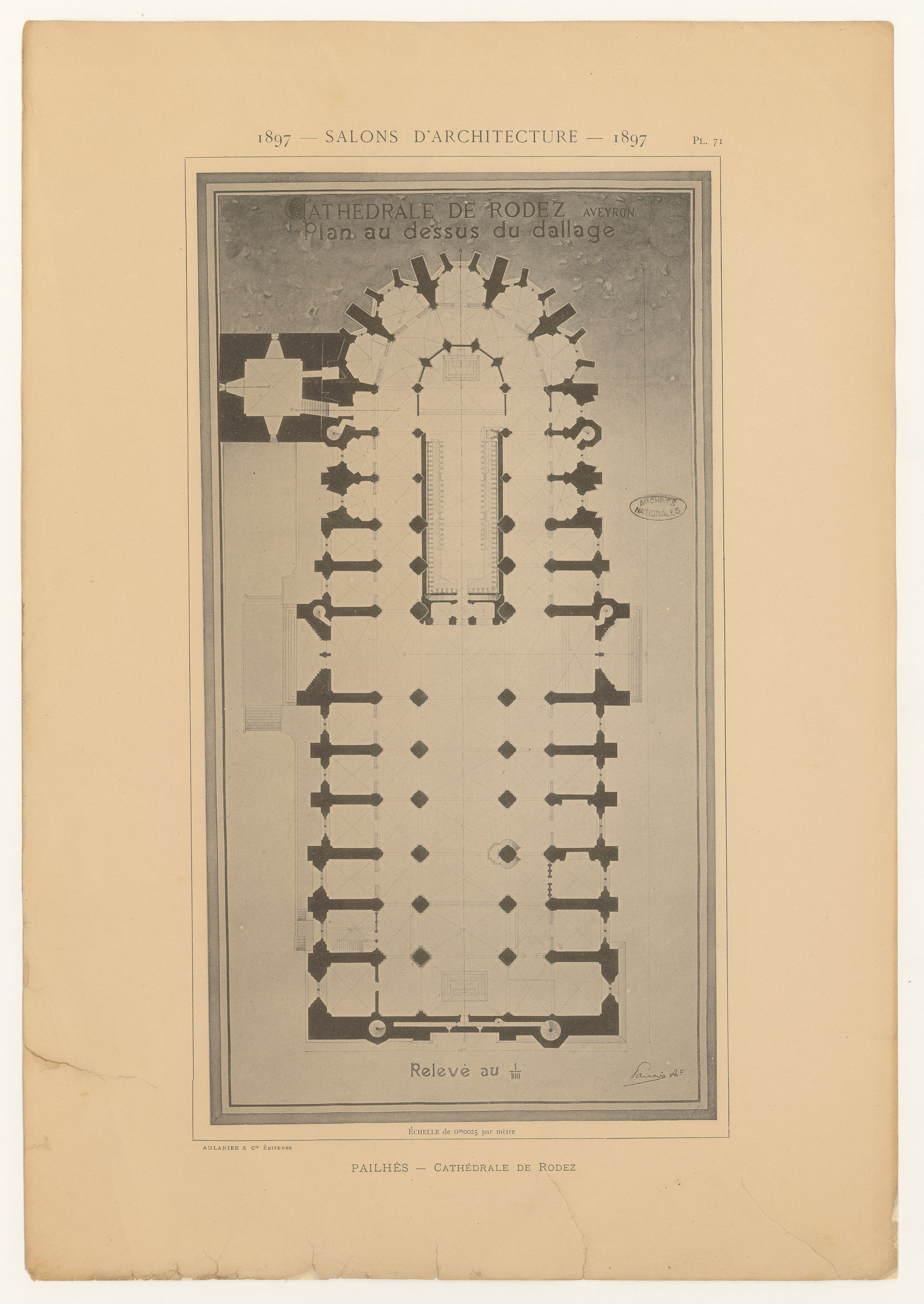
Interior plan (1897 lithograph)

== Exterior ==
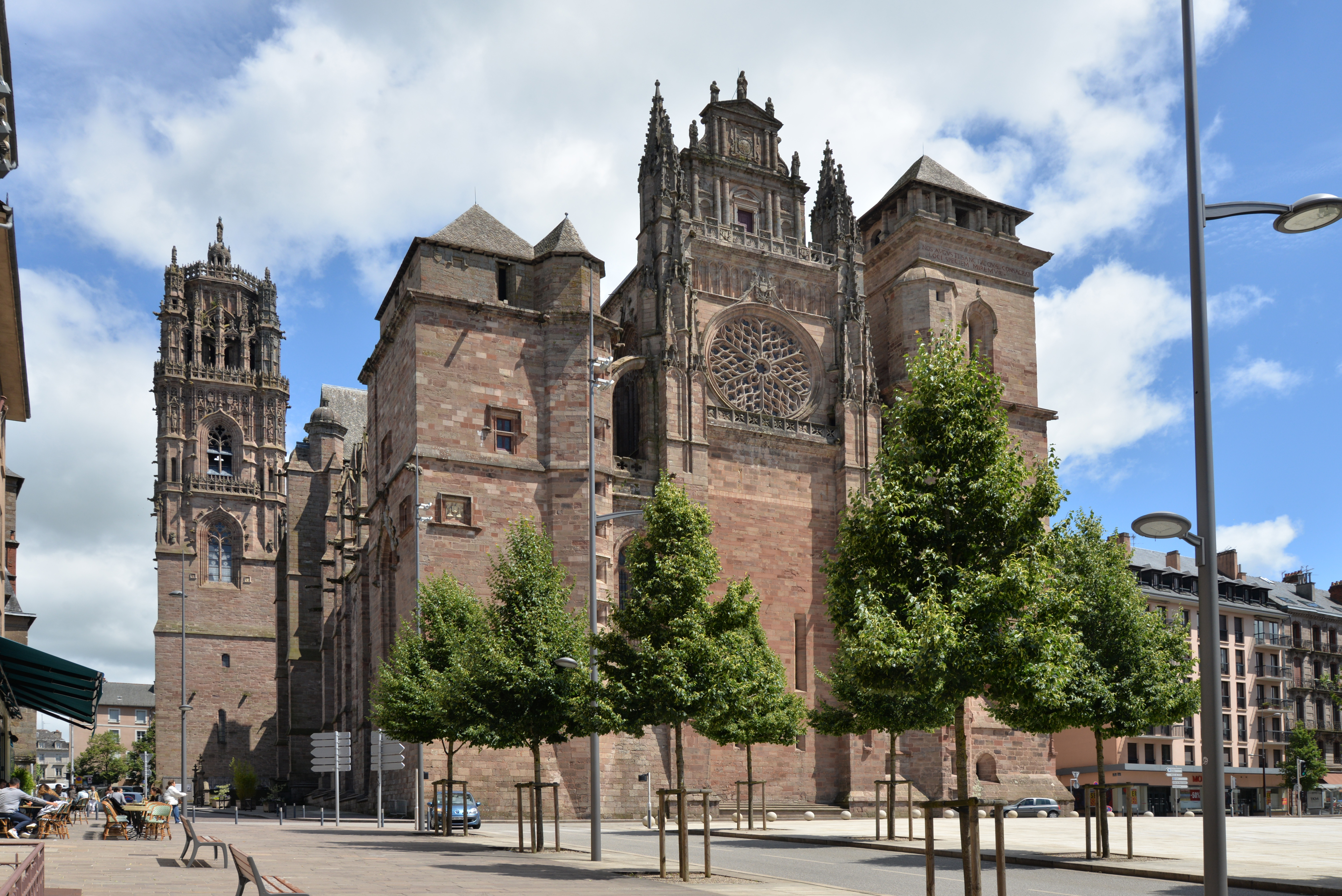
Cathedral viewed from the northwest, with north bell tower at left

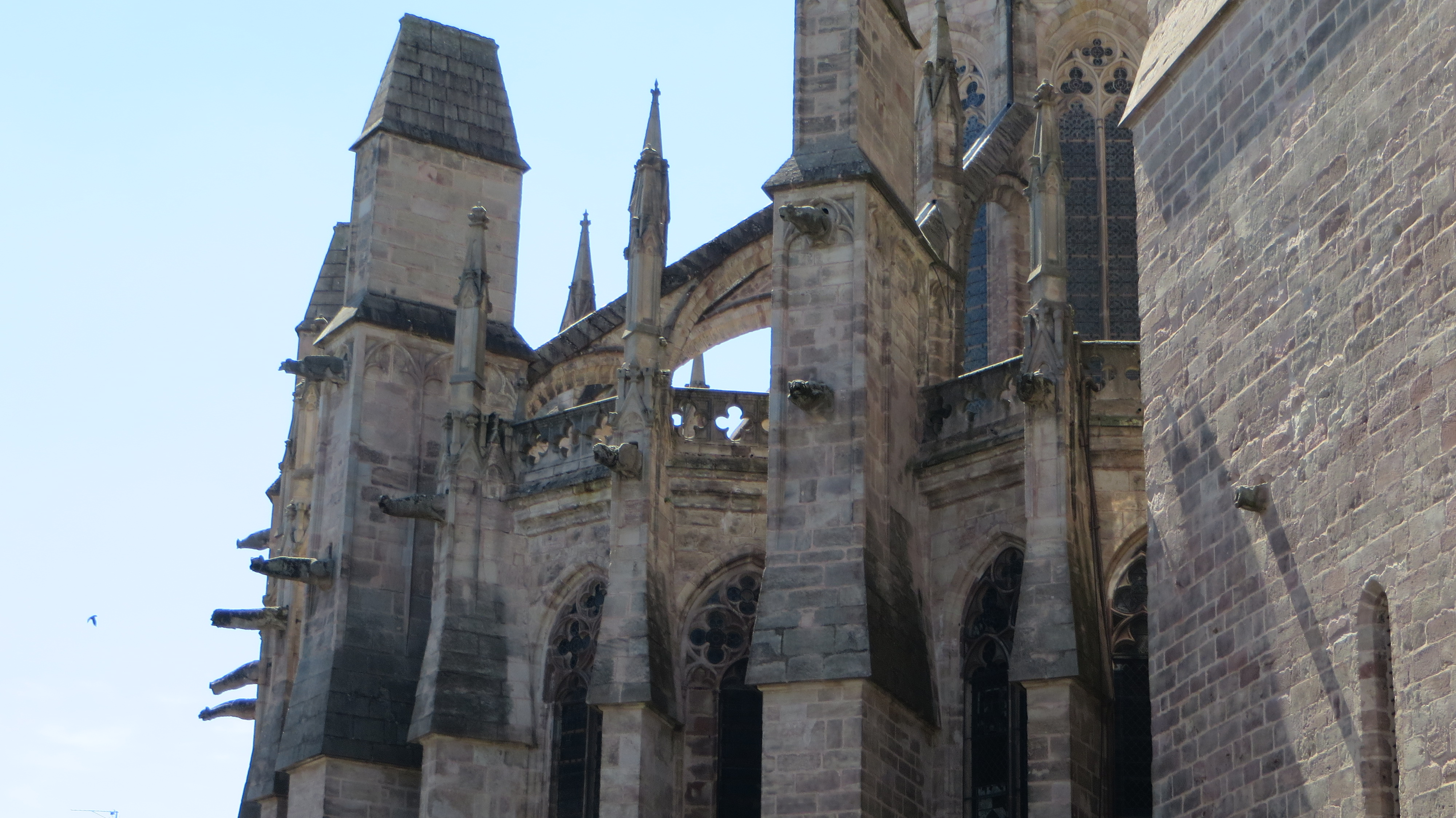
East end, or Chevet, with radiating chapels and flying buttresses

The construction of the church began in about 1277, and commenced with the chevet, at the east end, flanked by an imposing square tower on the north side, which was built up only two levels. Construction of the unfinished work resumed in the 16th century when Francois d'Estaing completed the north tower with a Flamboyant bell tower 87 meters high. The west front, with its own flamboyant decoration, was completed by Georges d'Armagnac between 1529 and 1562.

=== West Front ===
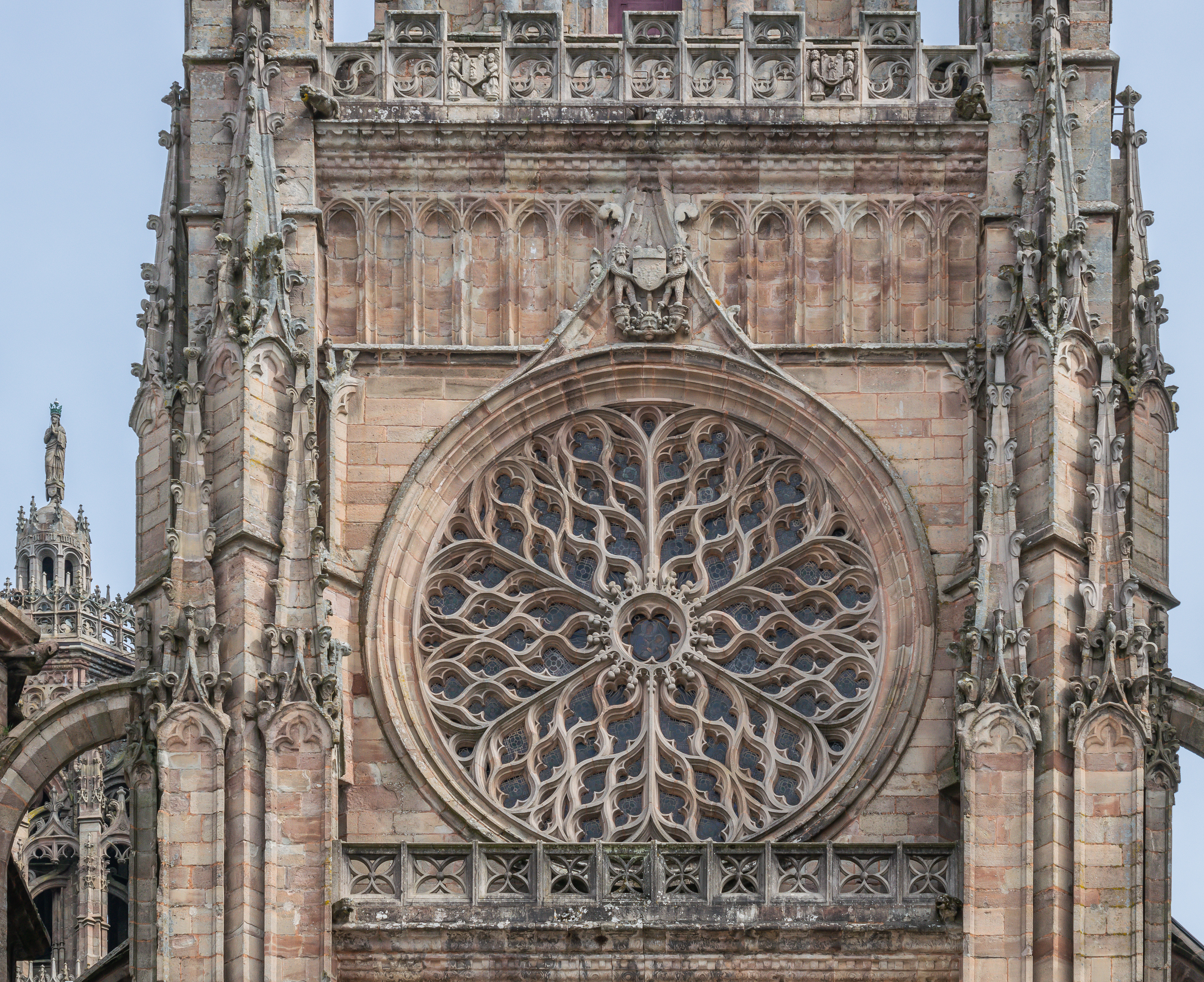
Flamboyant rose window of the west front (1520)

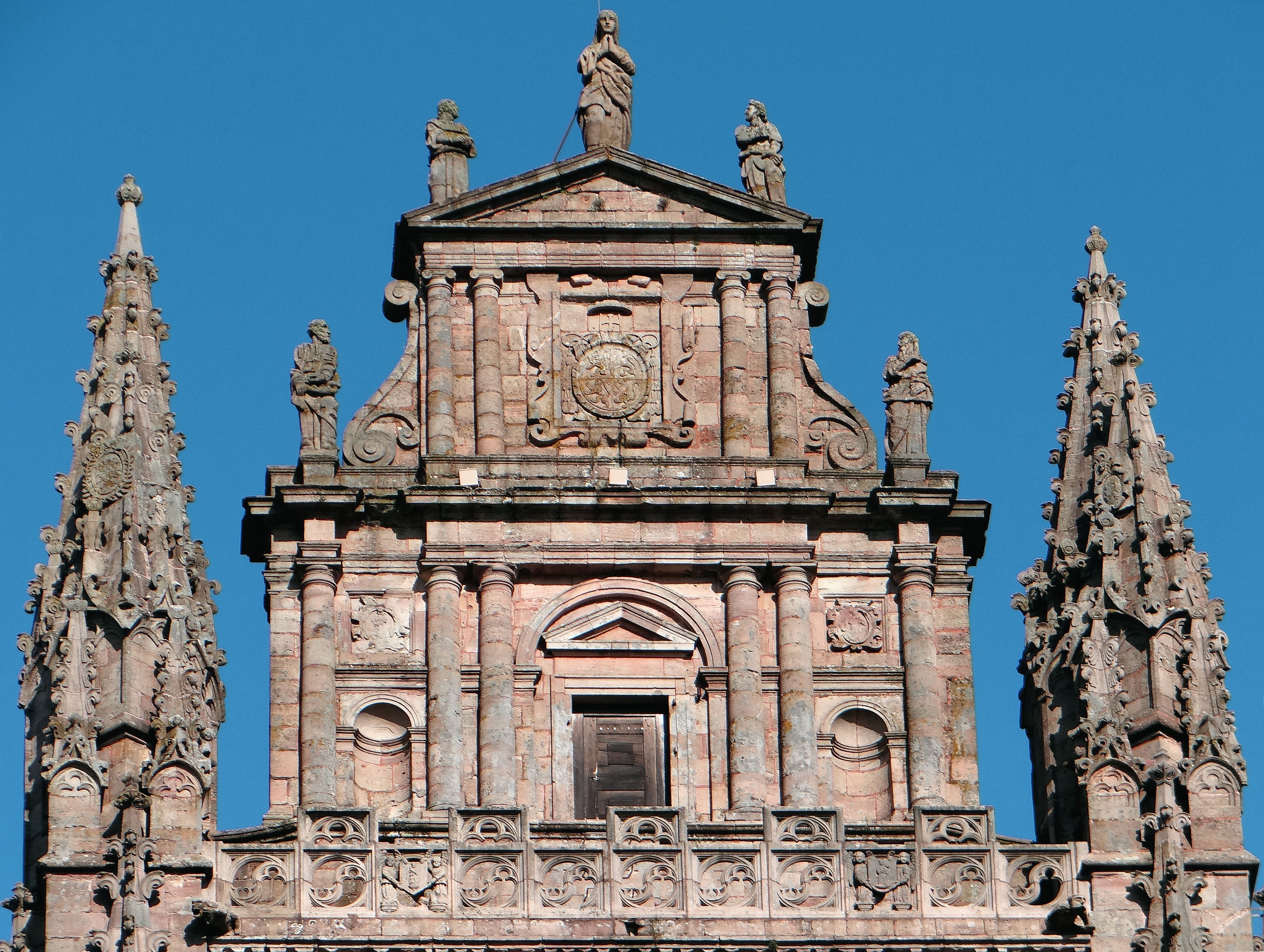
Detail of the upper west front, with a Renaissance fronton (1550-1562)

The lower portion of the west front at Rodez, the traditional entrance to Gothic cathedrals, is flat and plain, with narrow slit windows for defense and no large portal. It originally extended outside the city wall, and large doors or windows were avoided to prevent access by the attackers to the city. The lower are made of reddish sandstone, in the Gothic style of northern France. The upper levels of the west front were constructed between 1529 and 1562 by Bishop Georges d'Armagnac. The upper central vessel of the nave has a large rose window, while the two unfinished towers on either side are decorated with engaged columns. Above the rose window is a fronton in the new Renaissance style, the work of Jean Salvanh.

=== Tower ===
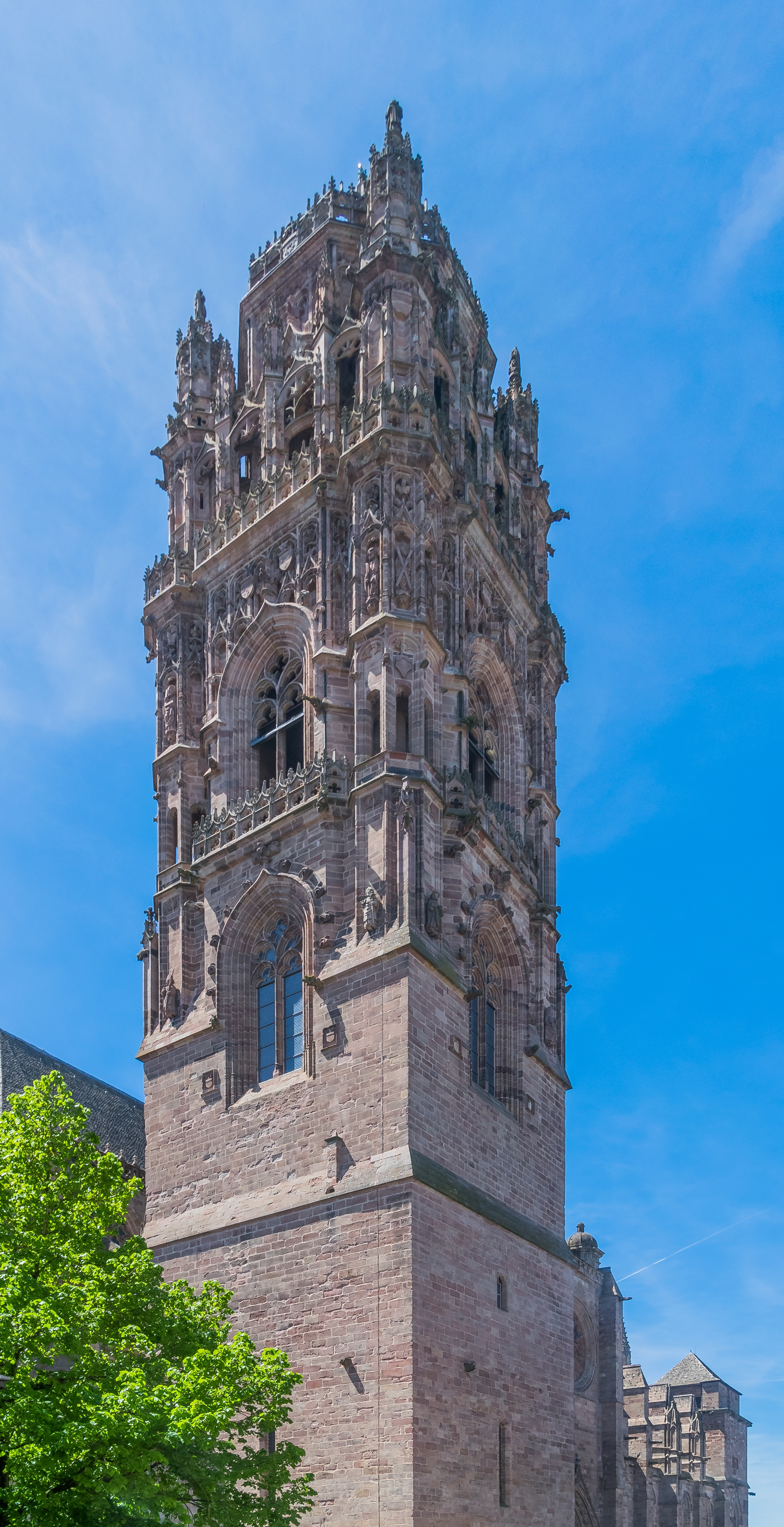
The flamboyant tower (16th century) on its earlier Gothic base

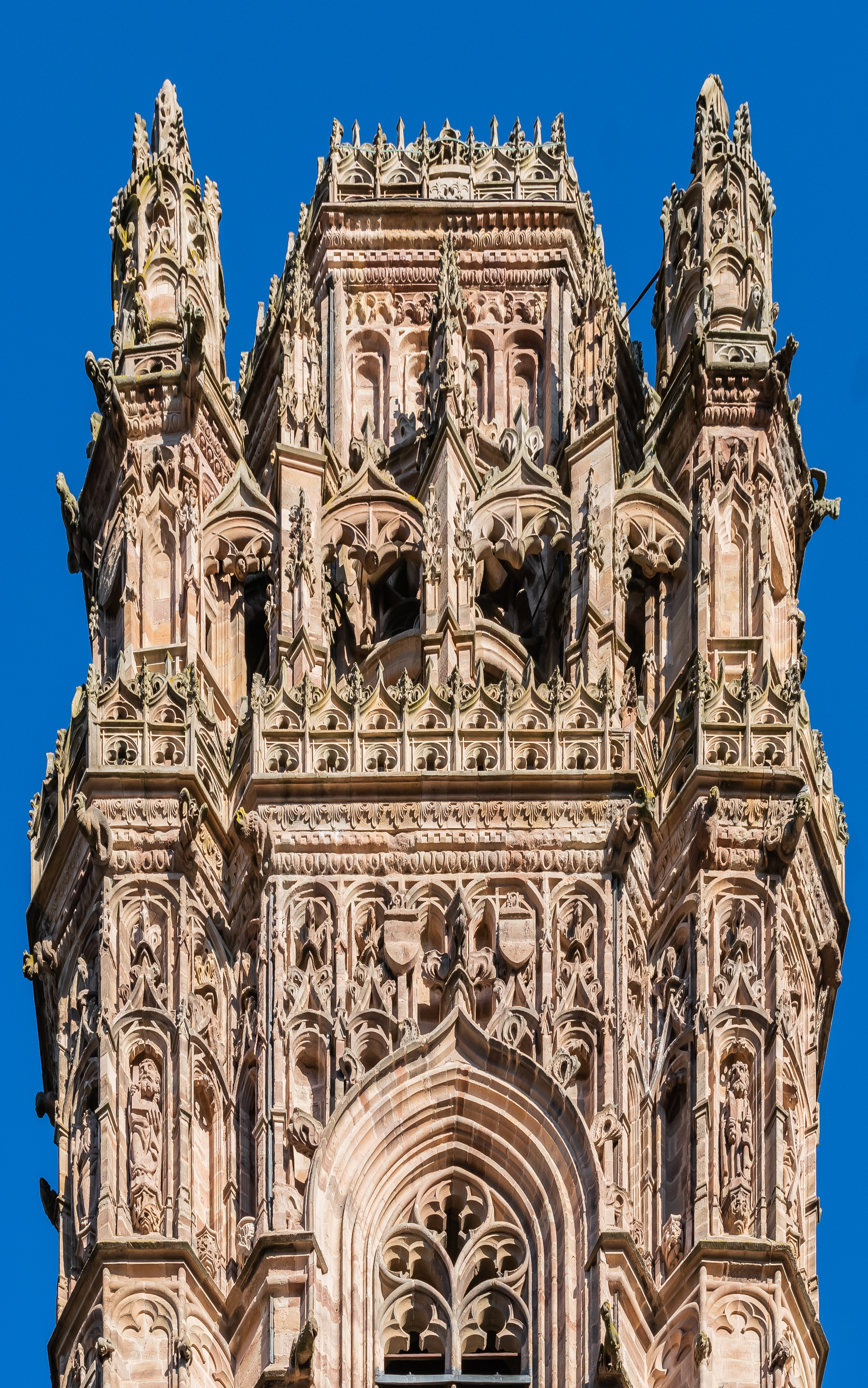
The flamboyant upper tower (16th century)

The highly flamboyant north bell tower, 87 meters high, is placed on the north side of the tower. It was commissioned by Bishop Francois d'Estaing in 1513 and completed in 1526 by master builder Antoine Salvanh. The tower is topped by a lantern which in turn is crowned by a statue of the Virgin Mary surrounded by four angels.

==== Bells ====
Rodez Cathedral has 12 bells in total in the tower. 9 of which are placed inside the bell tower in a wooden belfry and named after a Saint. They were cast by Morel in 1851 and installed in the bell tower in 1853, forming a C major scale. The largest bell or bourdon is equipped with a system allowing to be rung by foot.

9 ringing bells of Rodez Cathedral
Bell Number	Name (French)	Mass
1	Saint-Pierre (Bourdon)	5,229
2	Sainte-Marie (2nd Bourdon)	1,911
3	Saint-Amans	1,336
4	Saint-Artémon	946
5	Saint-Jean	799
6	Saint-Dalmas	583
7	Sainte-Procule	398
8	Sainte-Foy	276
9	Sainte-Tarcisse	196

A 10th bell is located at the top of the bell tower, imprisoned in a pinnacle located on the summit terrace of the bell tower, it was cast in 1523, which was the clock bell (silent brass today). An 11th bell is located almost directly above the transept at the level of the roof of the church, Marie (called "the Mandarelle") was formerly used to ring the elevation. Finally, a 12th silent bell is also located in a window of the southwest tower, installed in 1847, still equipped with its wheel and wooden yoke. The ringing is sometimes incomplete due to the haphazard handling of the ringing control box.

=== The transept and portals ===
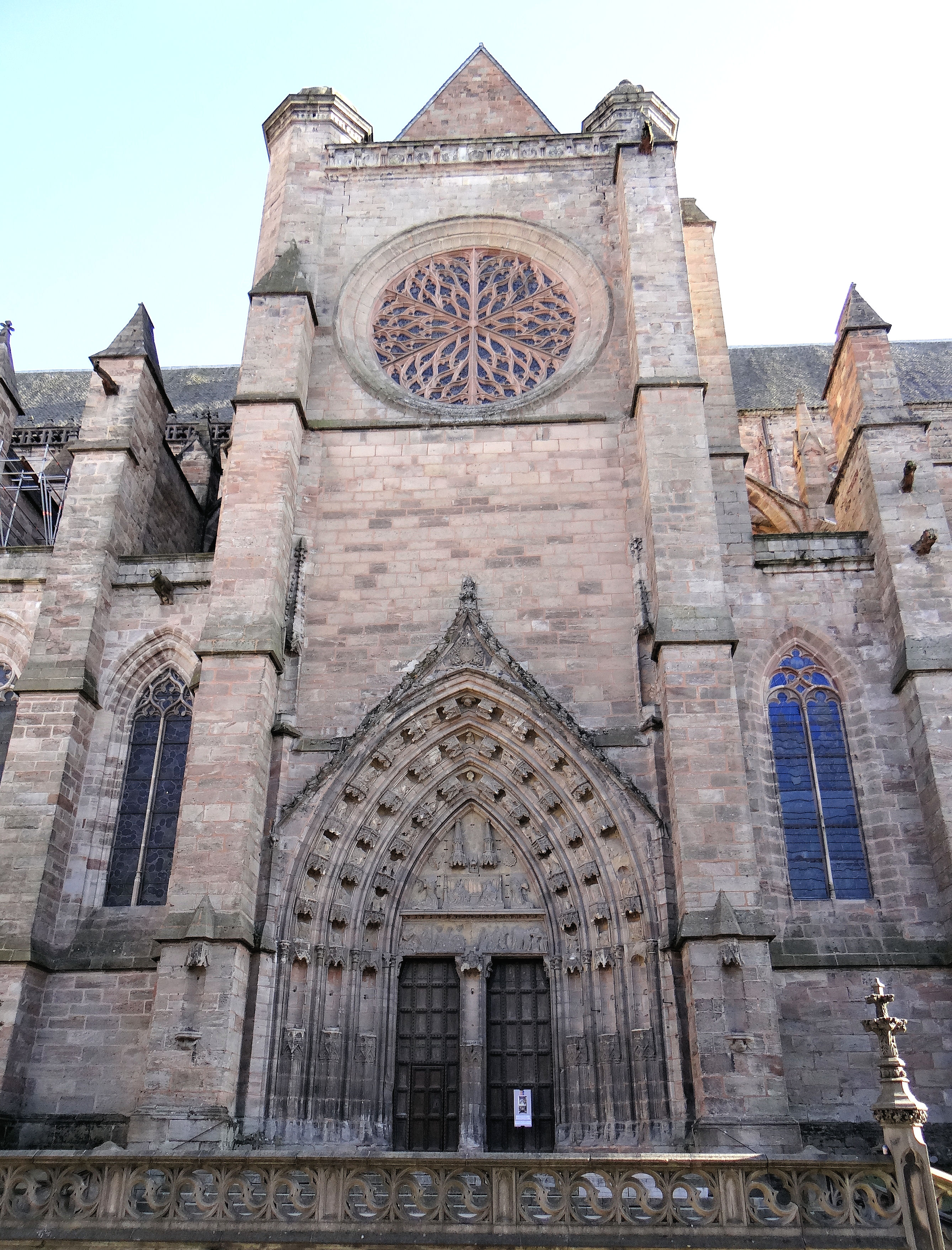
Facade and portal of the north transept

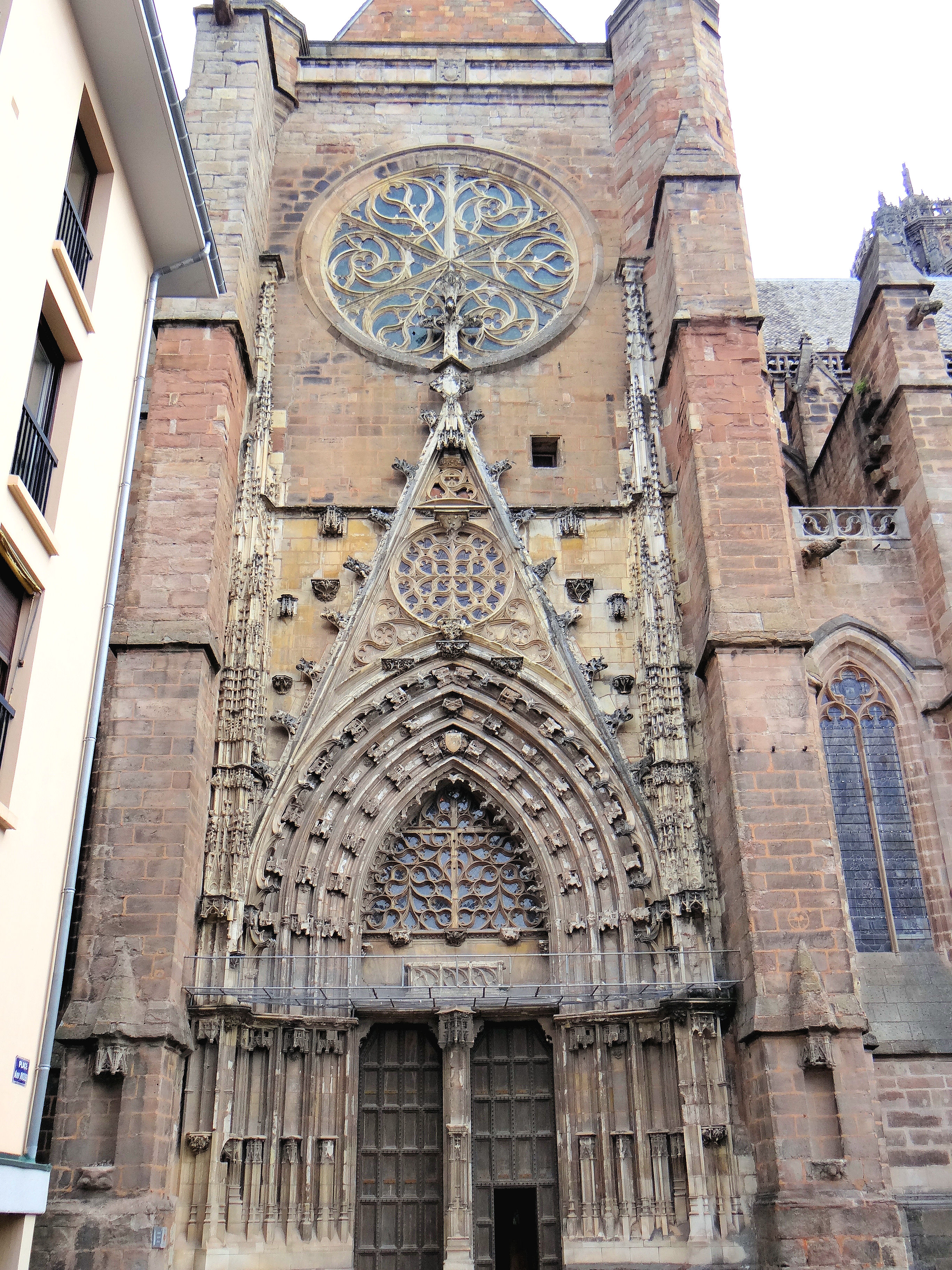
Facade and portal of the south transept

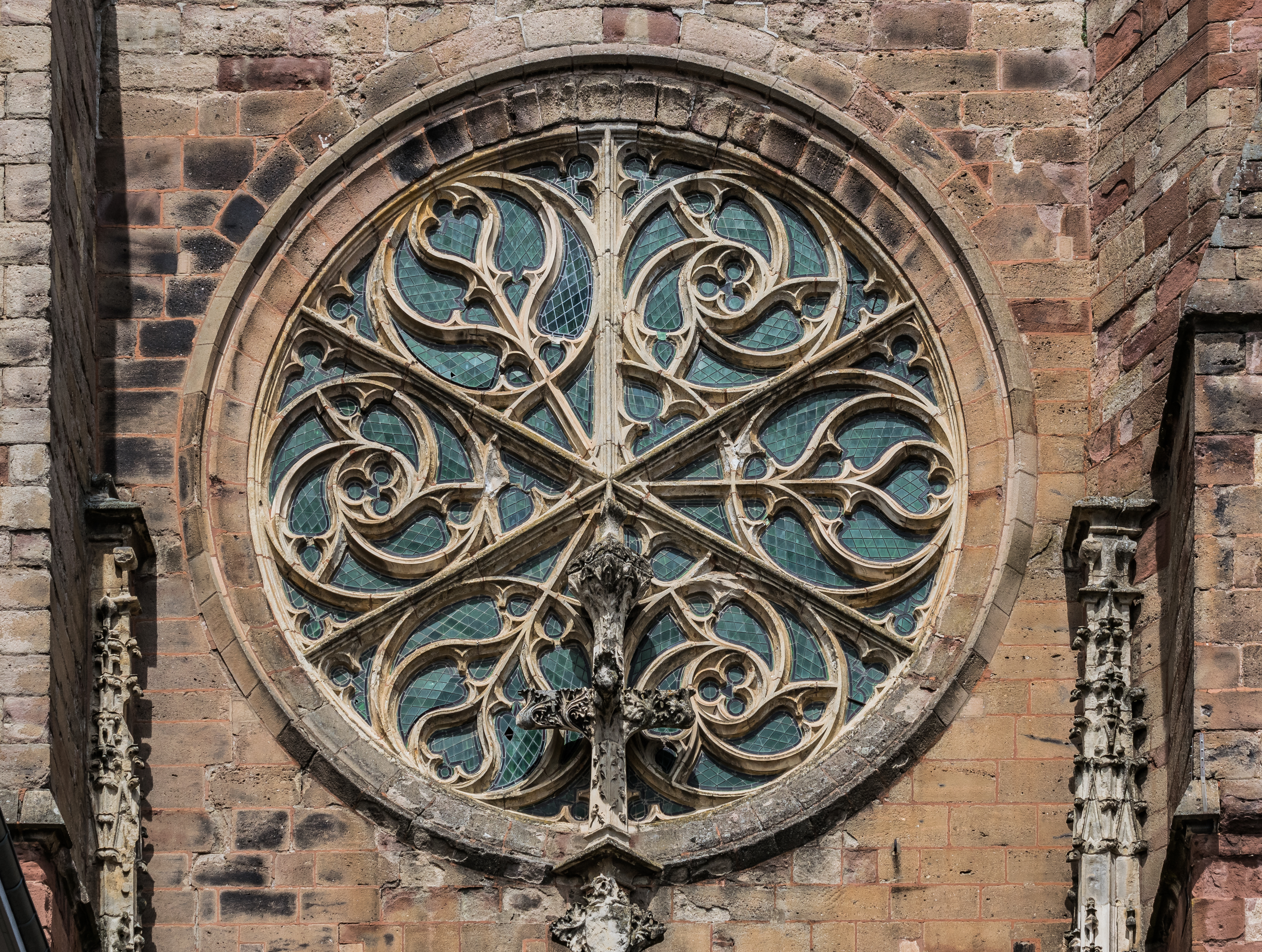
Rose window on the south transept

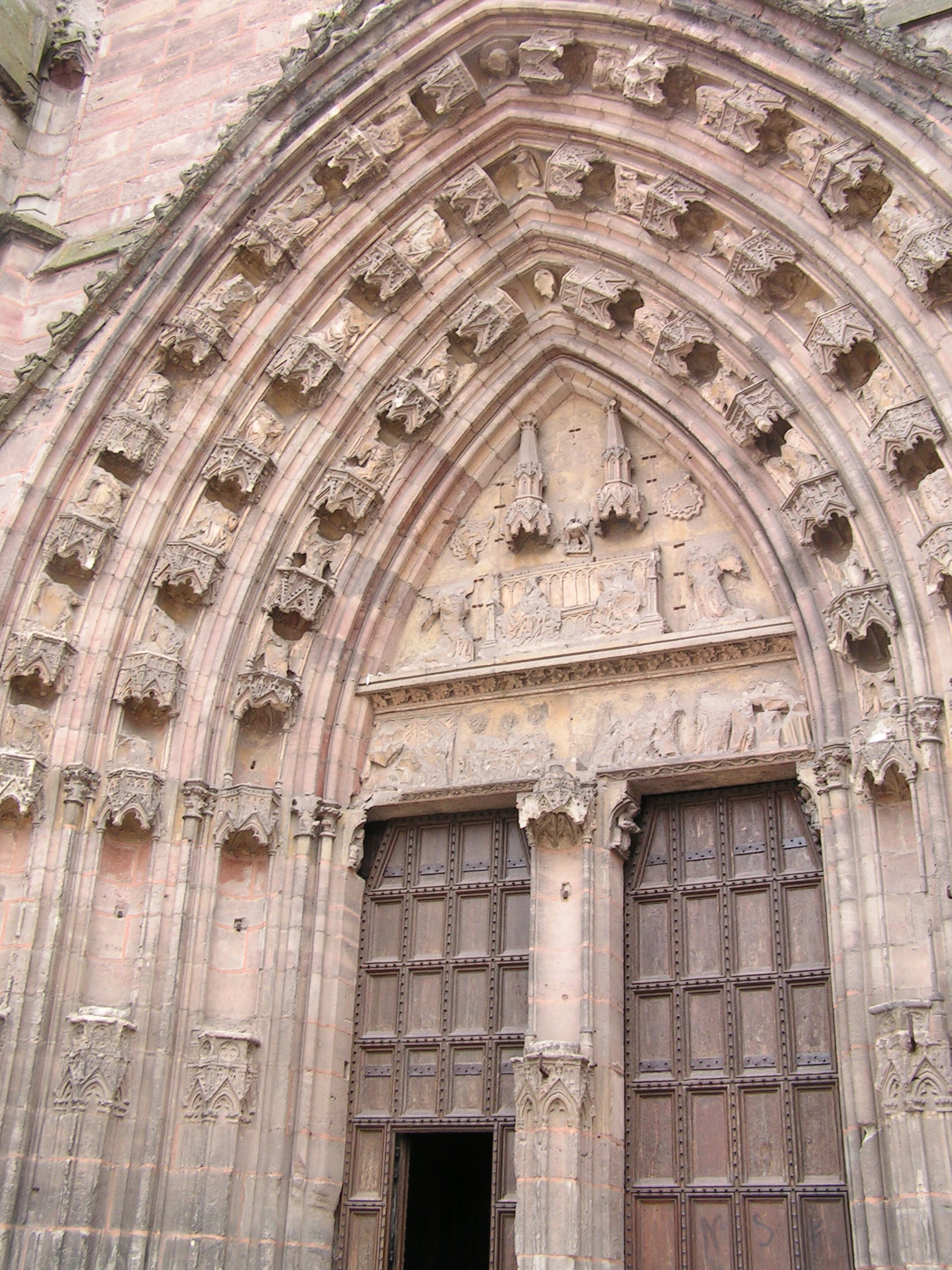
Detail of the north transept portal, without sculpture

Since the west front of the cathedral extended just outside the city walls, it did not have the traditional large portal on the west front. Instead, the entrances to the cathedral were on the north and south sides. In the 16th century, a transept was constructed at the meeting point between the nave and choir, which reached out to the east and west and had very elaborate portals, topped by filled with sculpture, and further decorated with gables and pinnacles. Flamboyant rose windows were placed over the portals on the north and south transept. Much of the sculpture was smashed during the French Revolution, but other elements survived and were restored.

== Interior ==
=== Nave and Choir ===
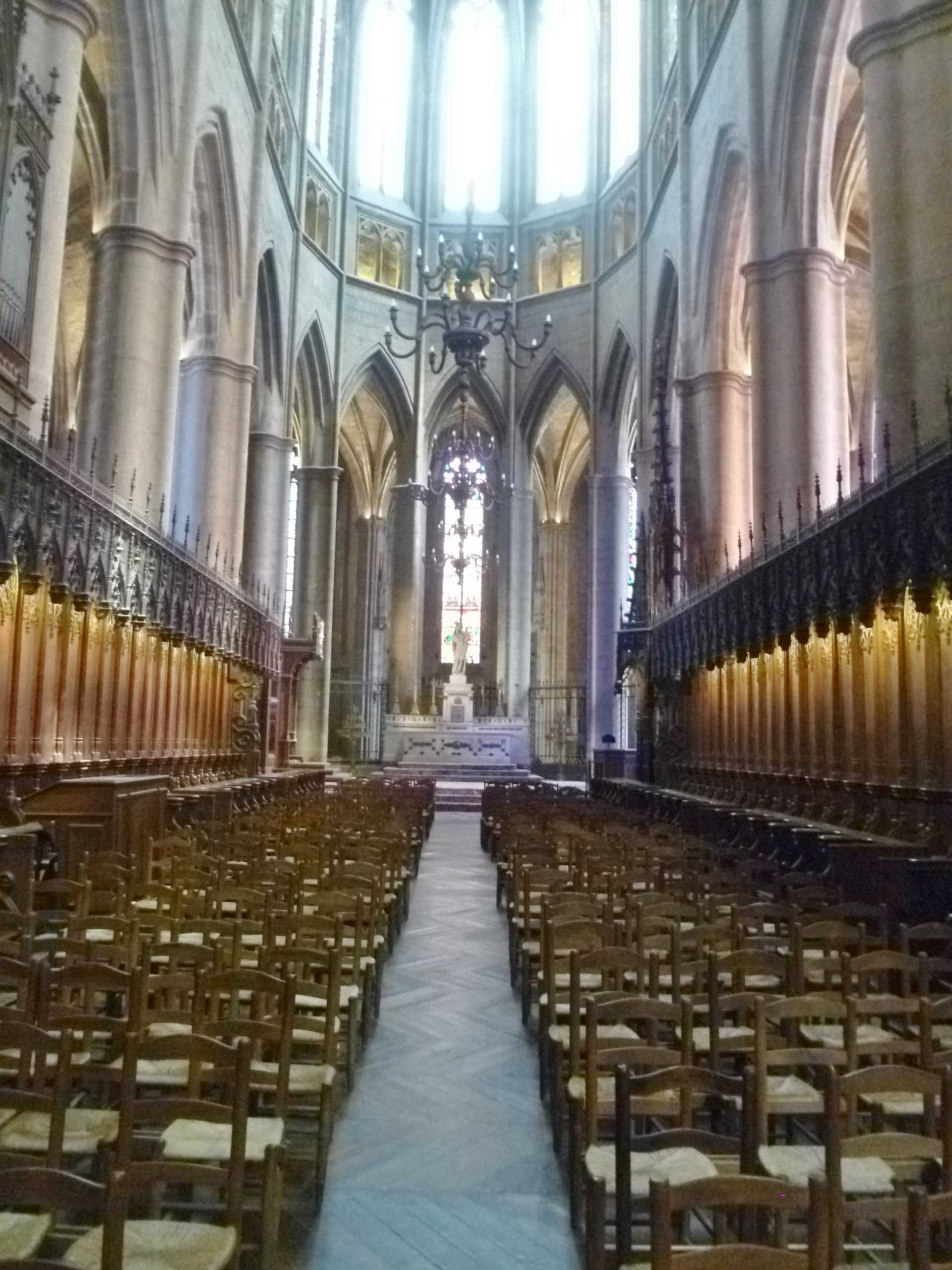
The nave and choir, looking east to the apse

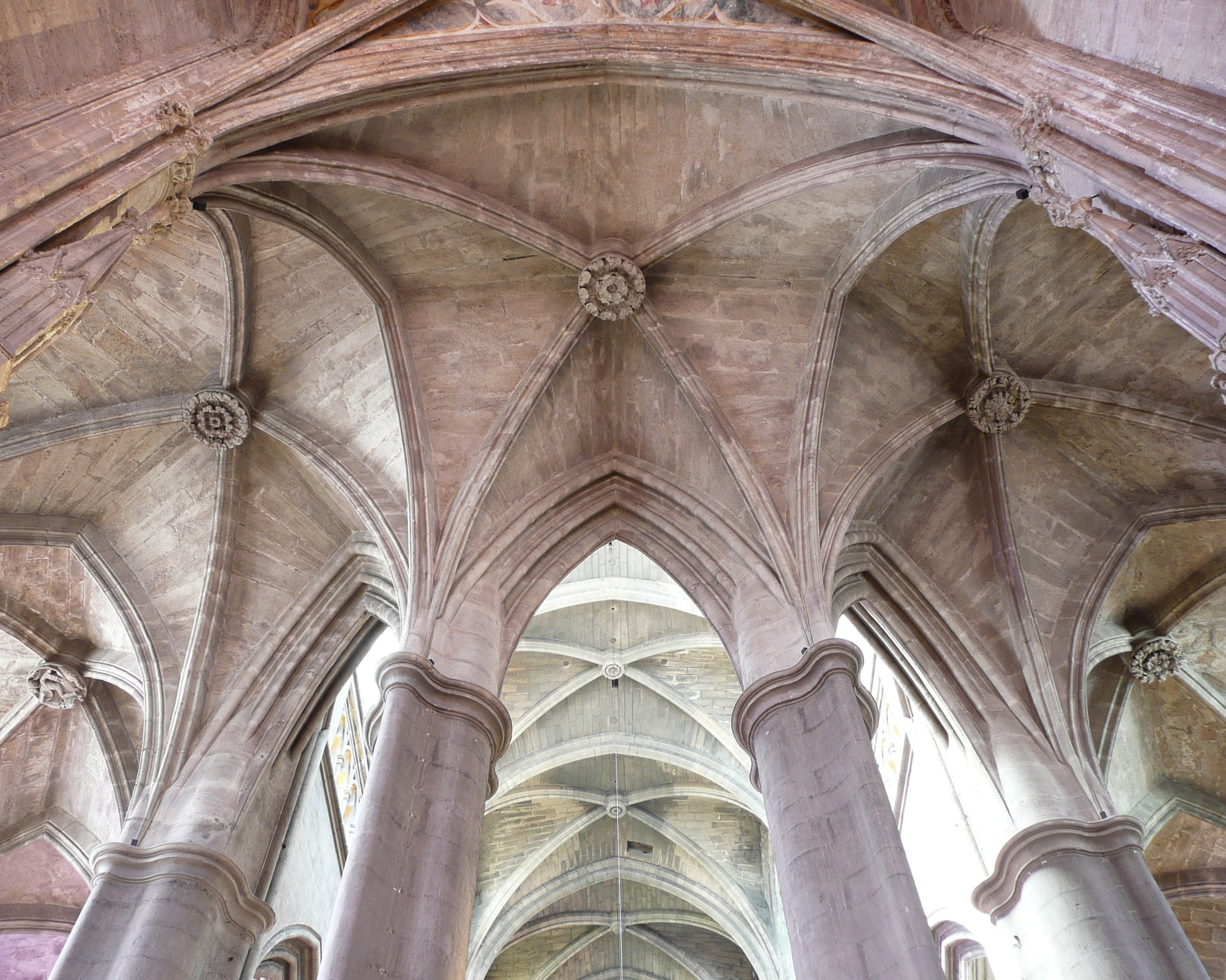
Vaults of the disambulatory, at the east end

The nave and choir of the church are 107 meters long, 37 meters wide at the transept, and 30 meters high in the nave. The nave and choir are constructed with three levels, following the design of Ile-de-France cathedrals; massive pillars on the ground floor; a narrow triforium or passage above; and upper walls filled with windows. Slender columns run up the walls from the arcade pillars to support the four-part rib vaults.

=== Chapels ===
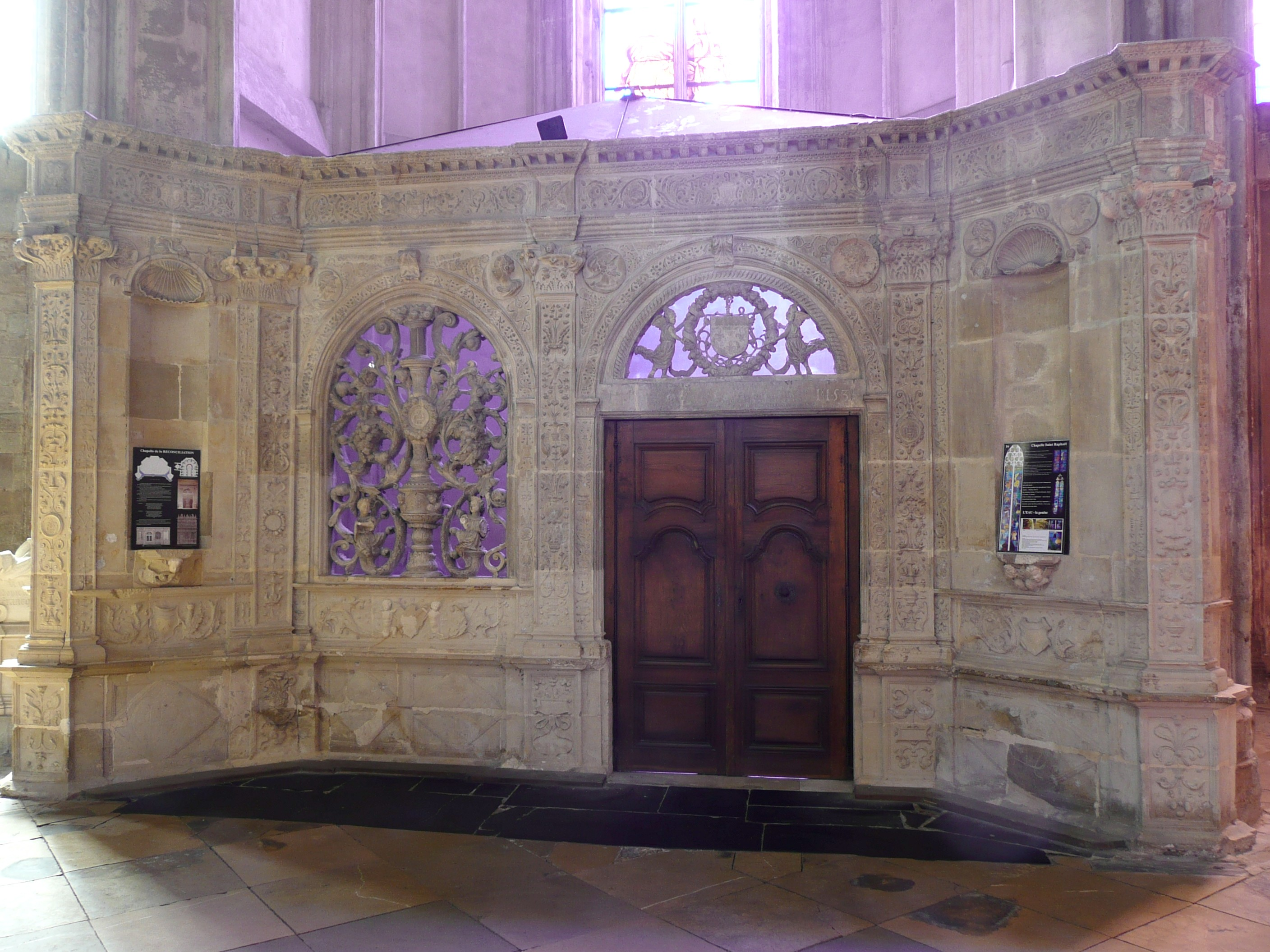
Renaissance decoration (16th century) installed in the Chapel of Reconciliation.

The cathedral has a group of radiating chapels within the apse, at the east end, accessed by a semicircular passage or deambulatory. It also has a group of chapels placed alongside the nave. The Chapel of Reconciliation has Renaissance decoration preserved from other parts of the buildings.

== Art and Decoration ==
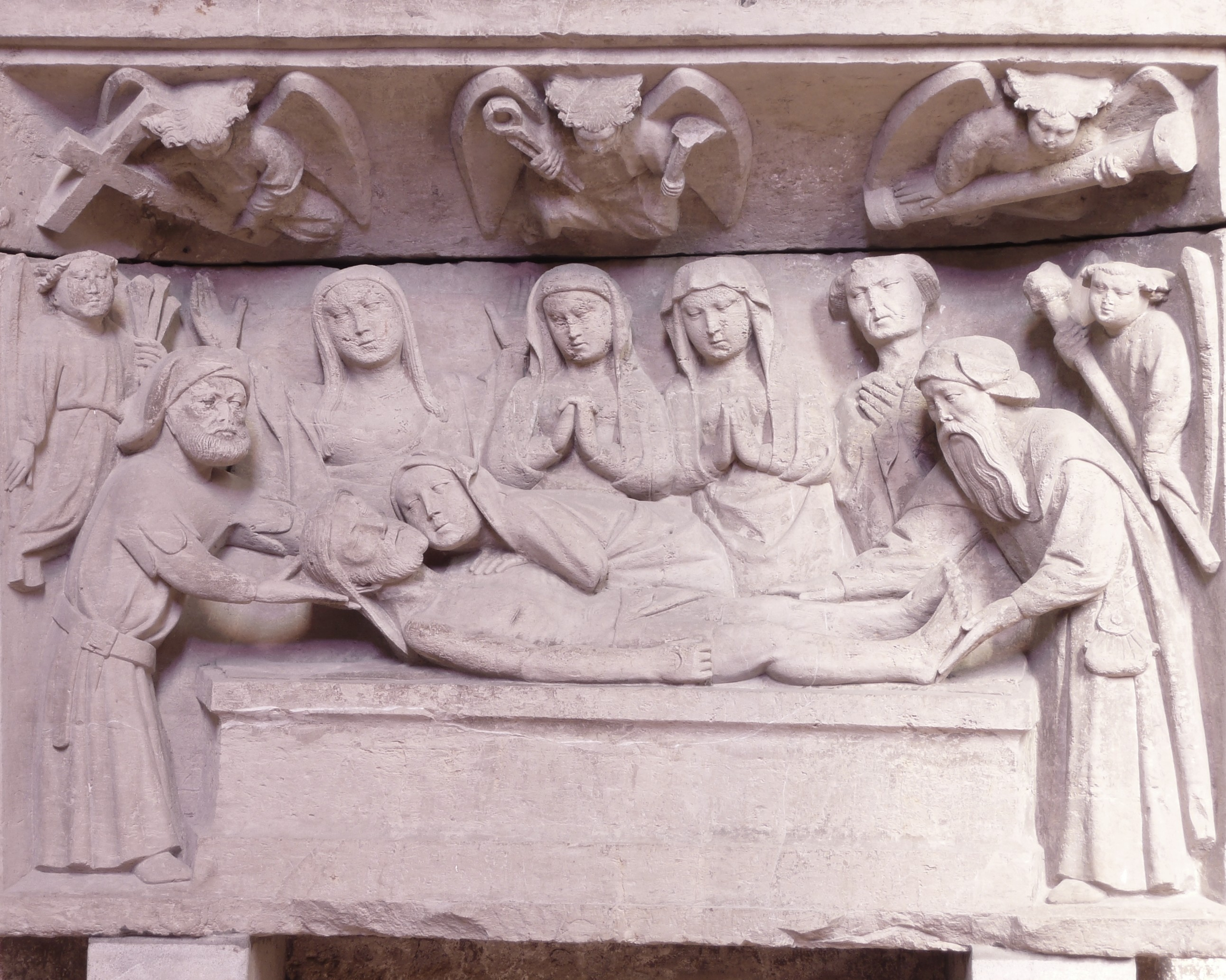
Relief sculpture from retable "Placement of Christ in the Tomb" (15th century)

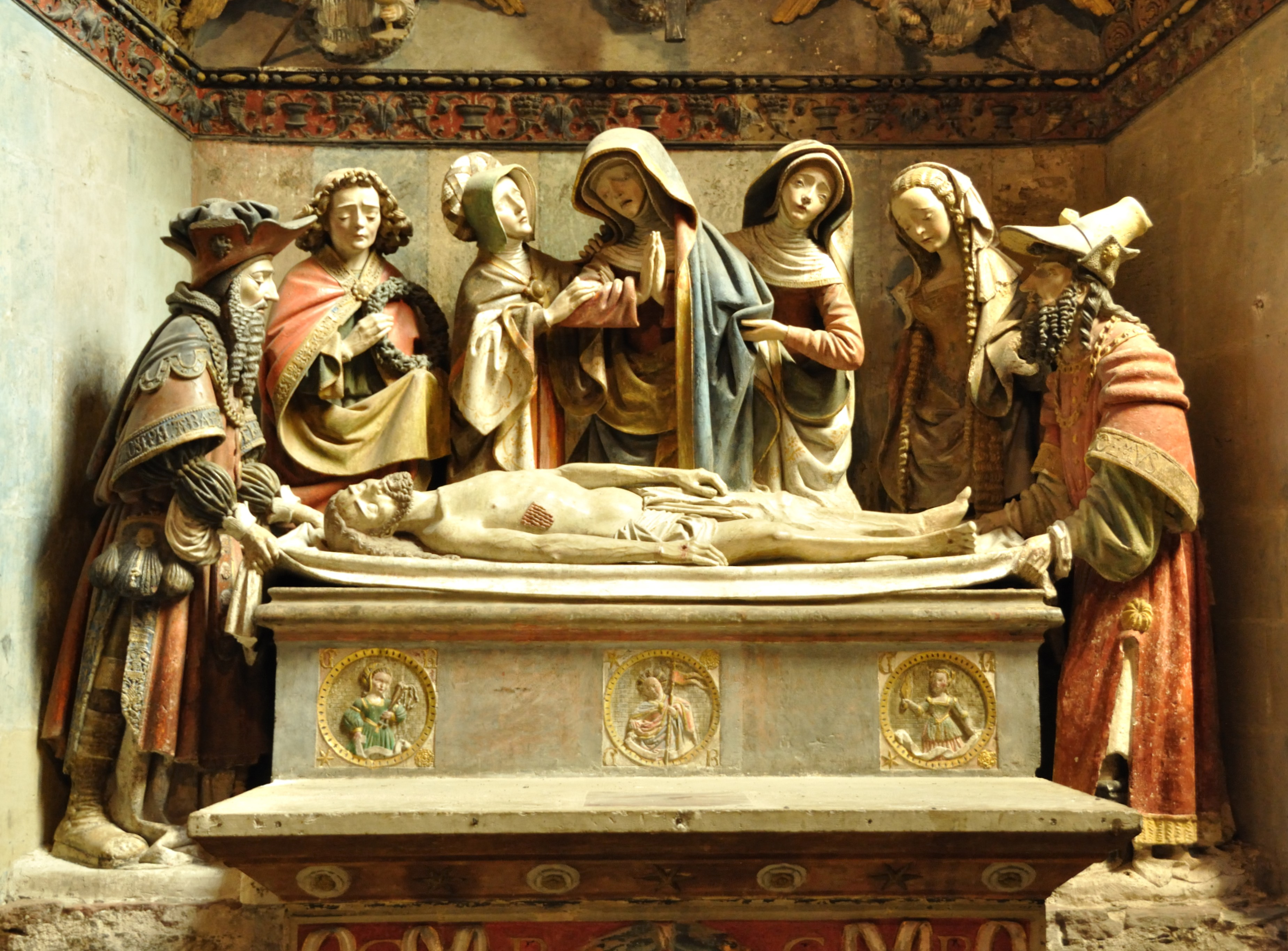
Scene on the Altar piece, "Placement of Christ in the Tomb" (16th century)

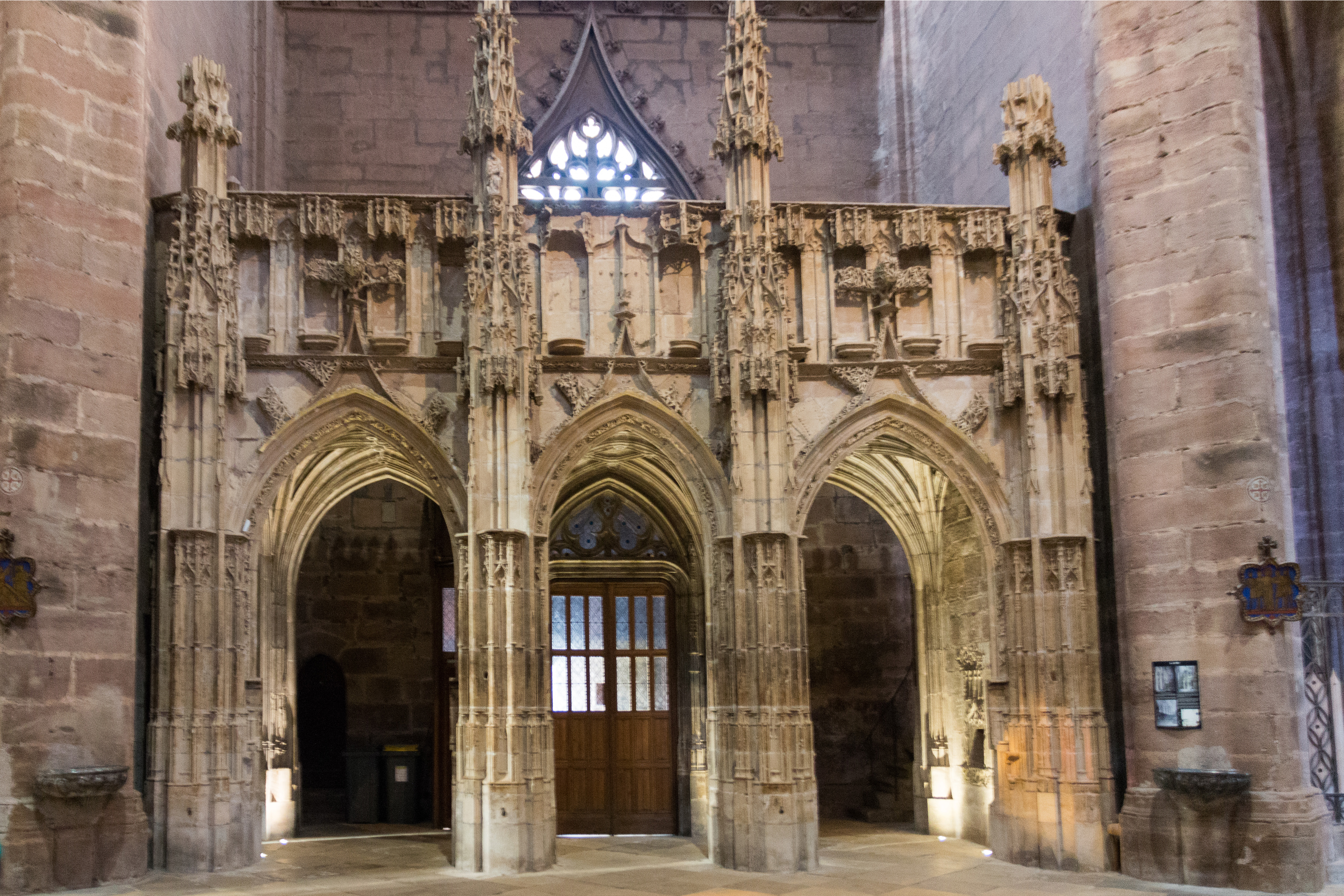
The rood screen, in the south transept (15th century)

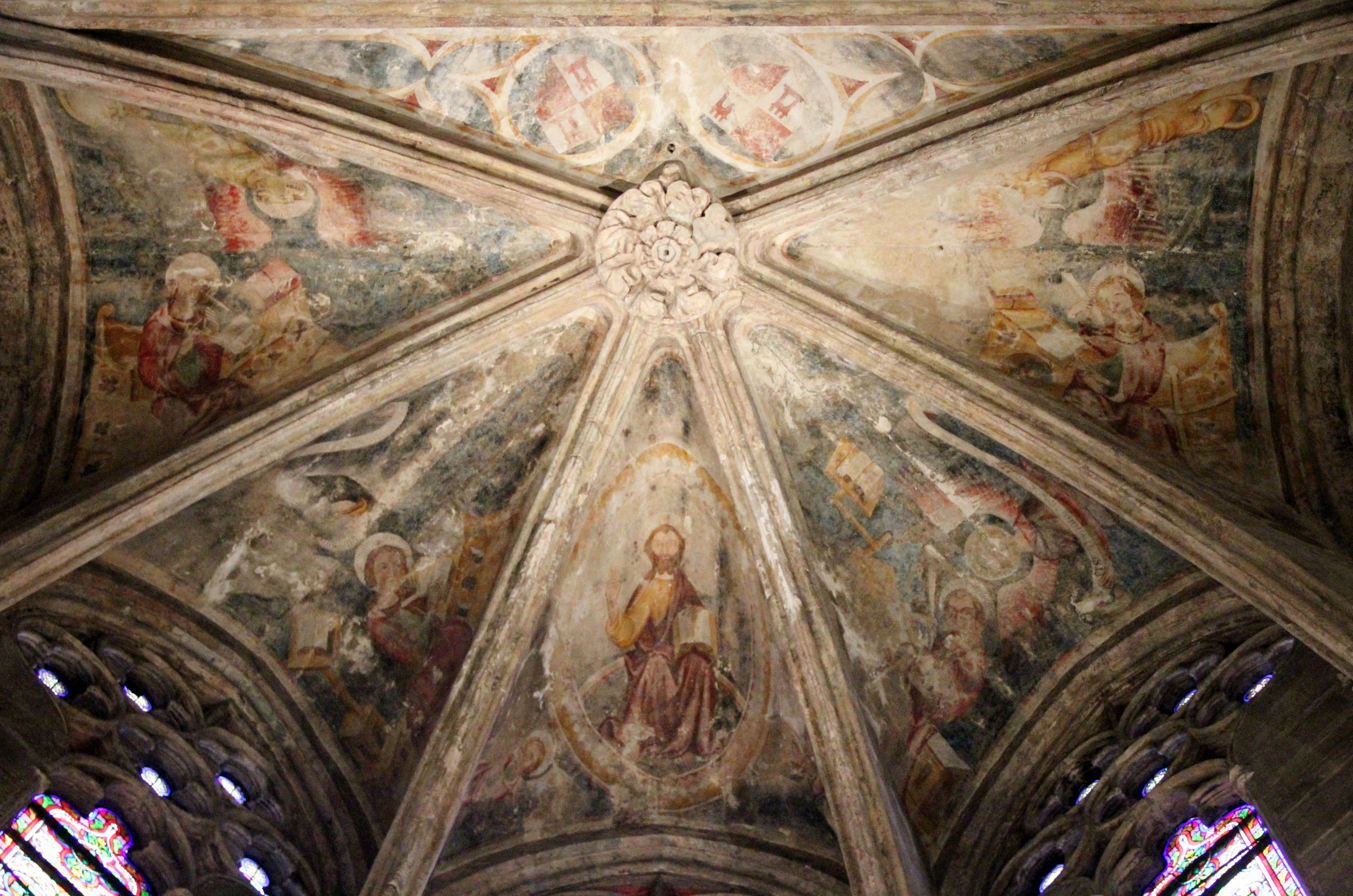
Fresco of Christ in his multiple roles on the ceiling of the apse axial chapel (14th century)

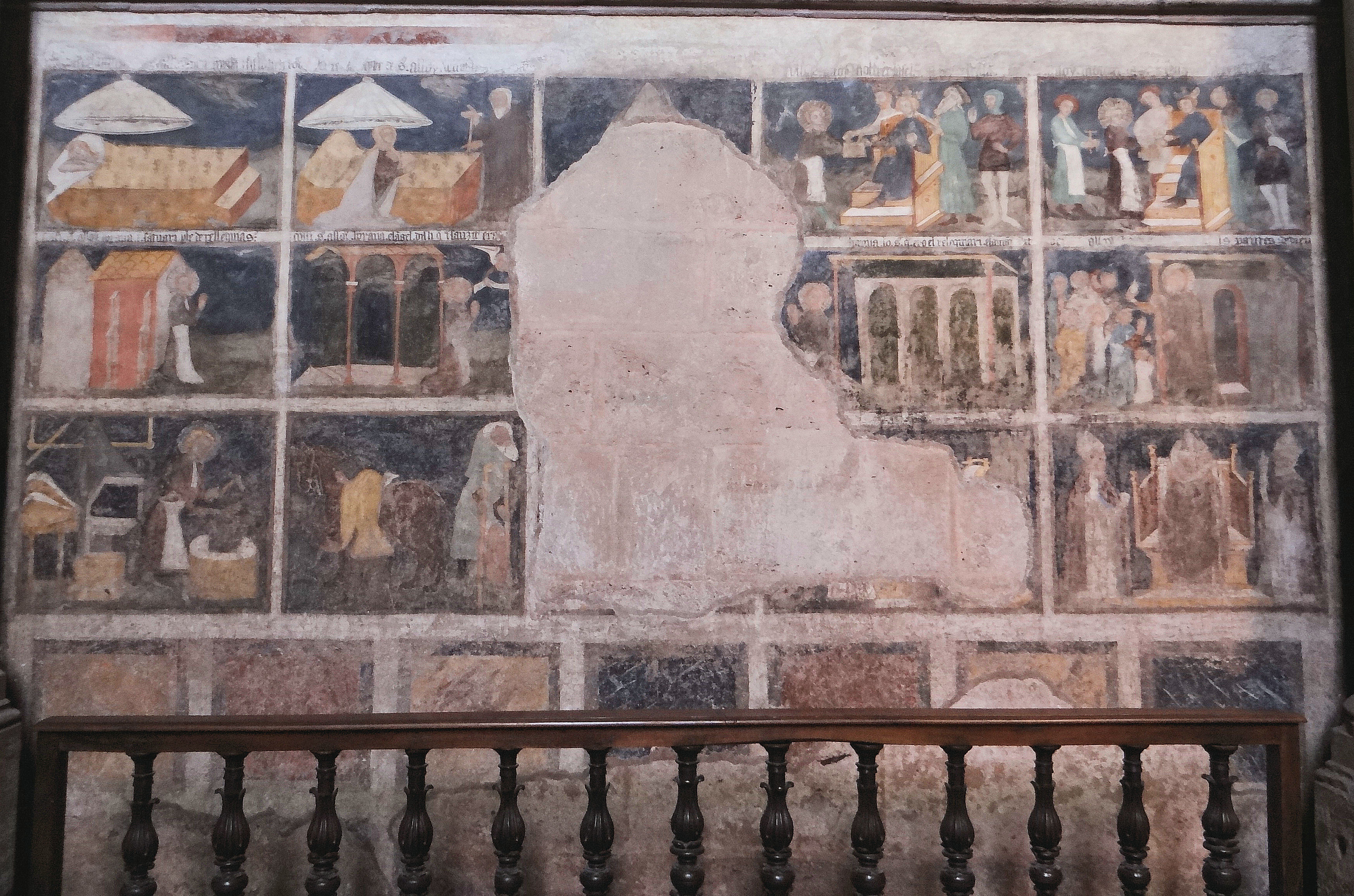
Frescoes depicting scenes of the life of Saint Eligius (15th century)

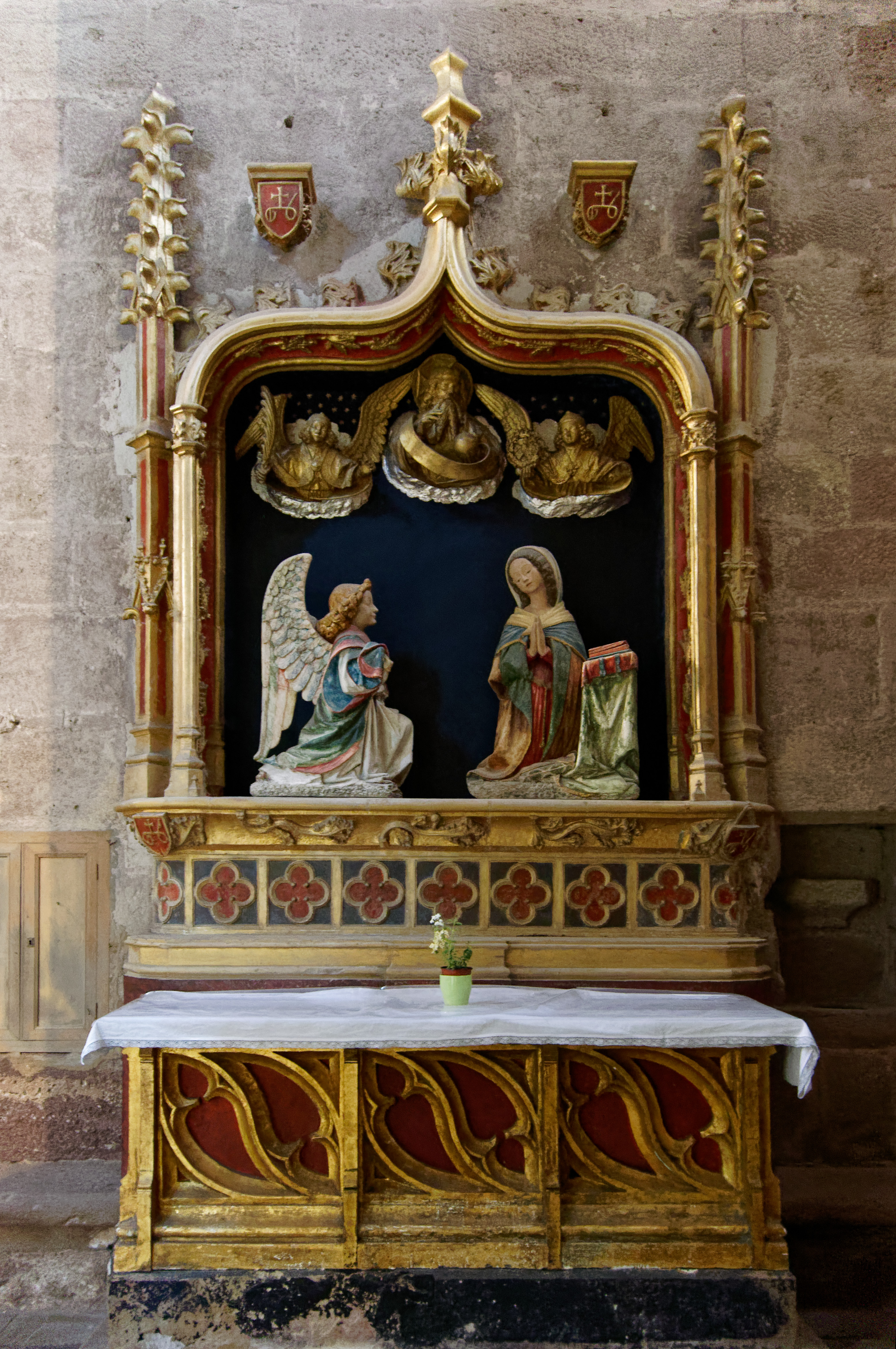
Retable of the Annunciation

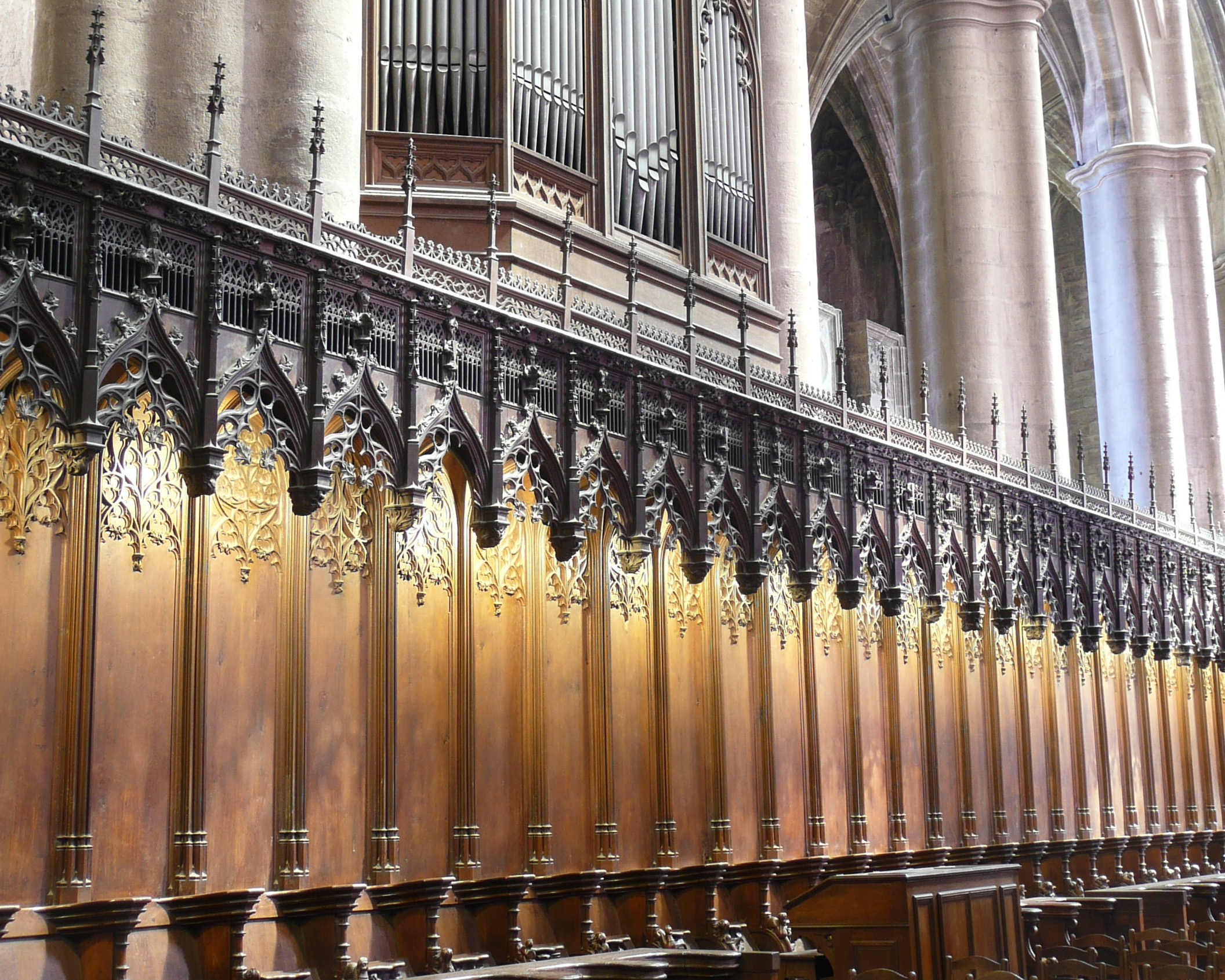
The carved choir stalls (15th century)

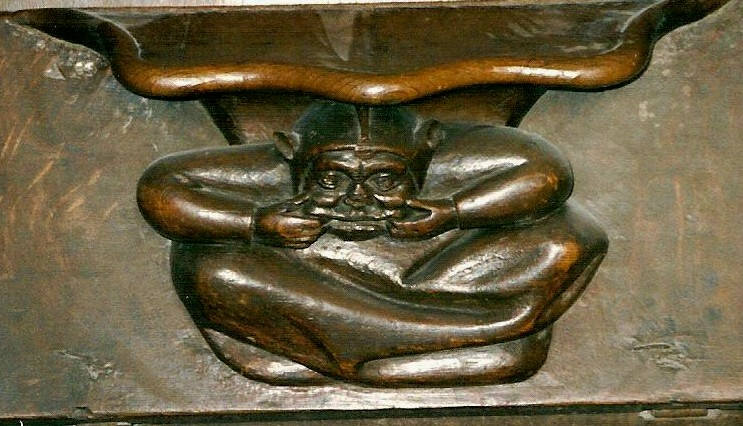
A misercordia on the back of a choir stall (15th century)

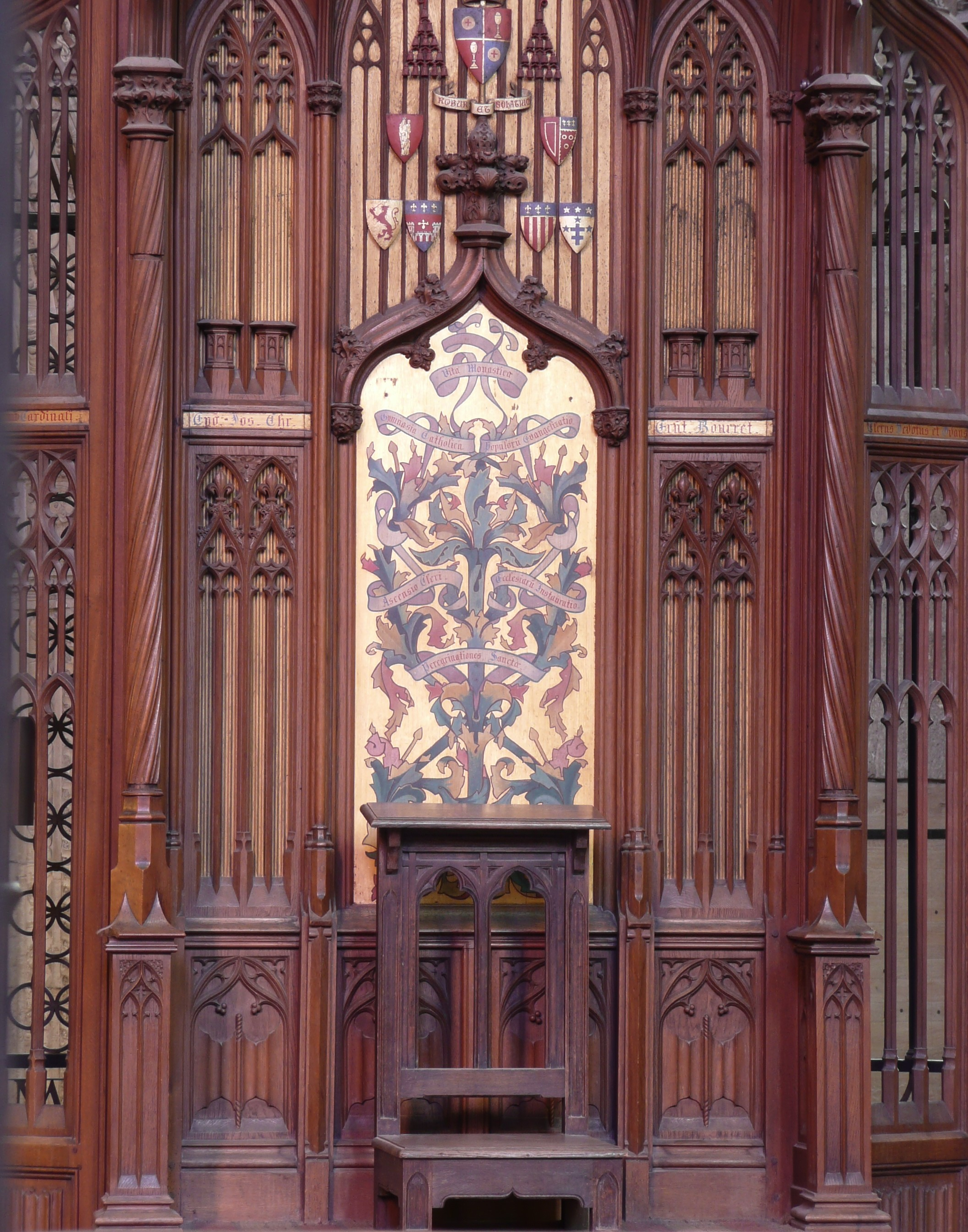
Carved decoration in the interior

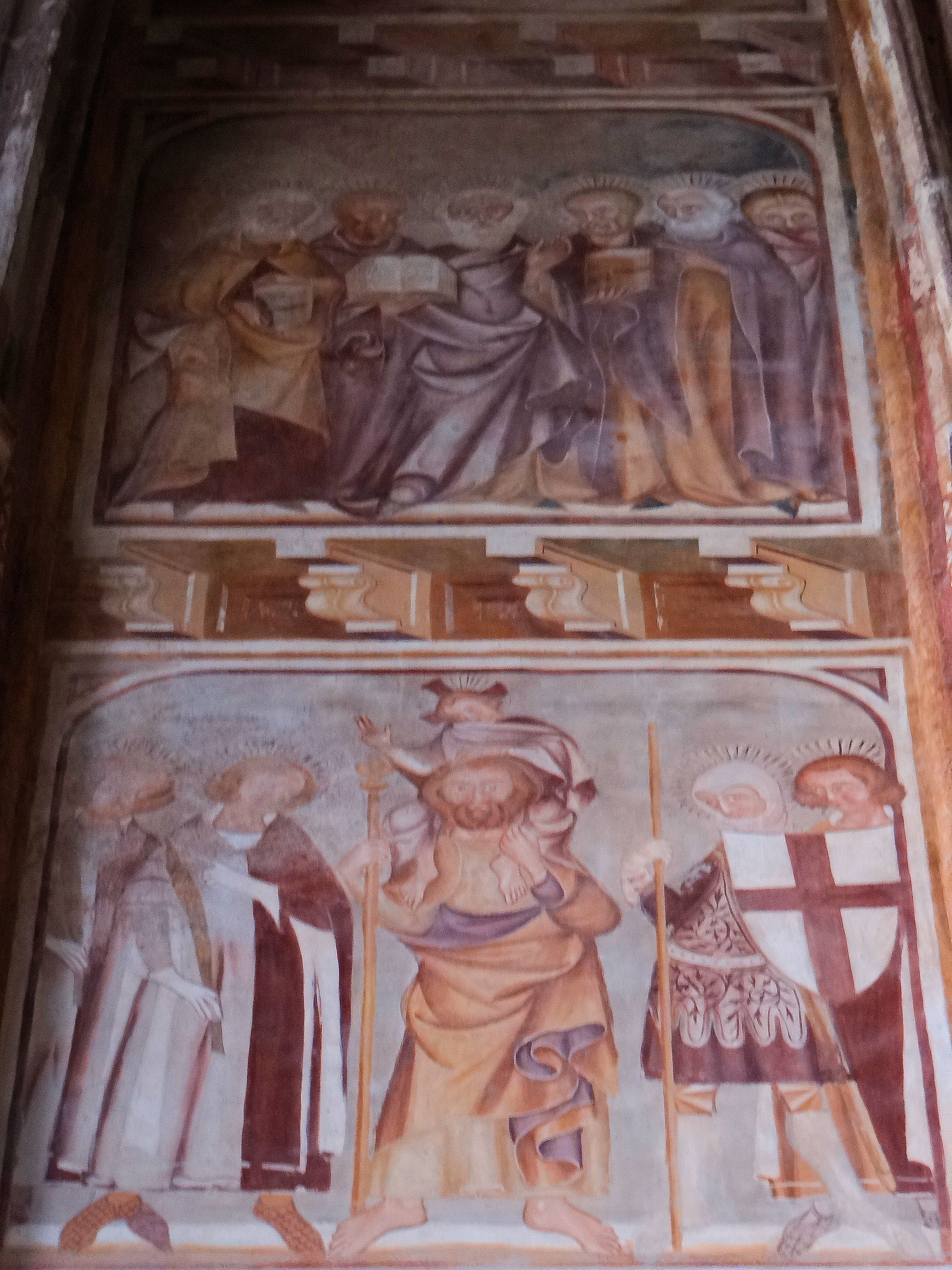
Murals in the Chapel of Saint Catherine : St. Christopher carrying the infant Jesus on his back alongside St.George

Rodez Cathedral is one of the few Gothic churches that retains a jubé or rood screen, placed between the choir and the nave. Most French rood screens were removed during the Renaissance, in response to a Vatican change in church doctrine intended to make the interior of churches more open and accessible to lay parishioners. The rood screen was installed in 1478, under Bishop Bertrand de Chalençon. Between the 18th and 19th centuries, the choir screen lost most of its elaborate sculpture but otherwise was moved intact to its present location in the north transept.

The choir stalls were also installed in 1478, and display a rich assortment of carved decorations, particularly on the misercordiae, the folding seats against which the clergy could find support when they were required to stand for long periods of time. They are decorated with carved Biblical figures and scenes.

== Stained glass ==
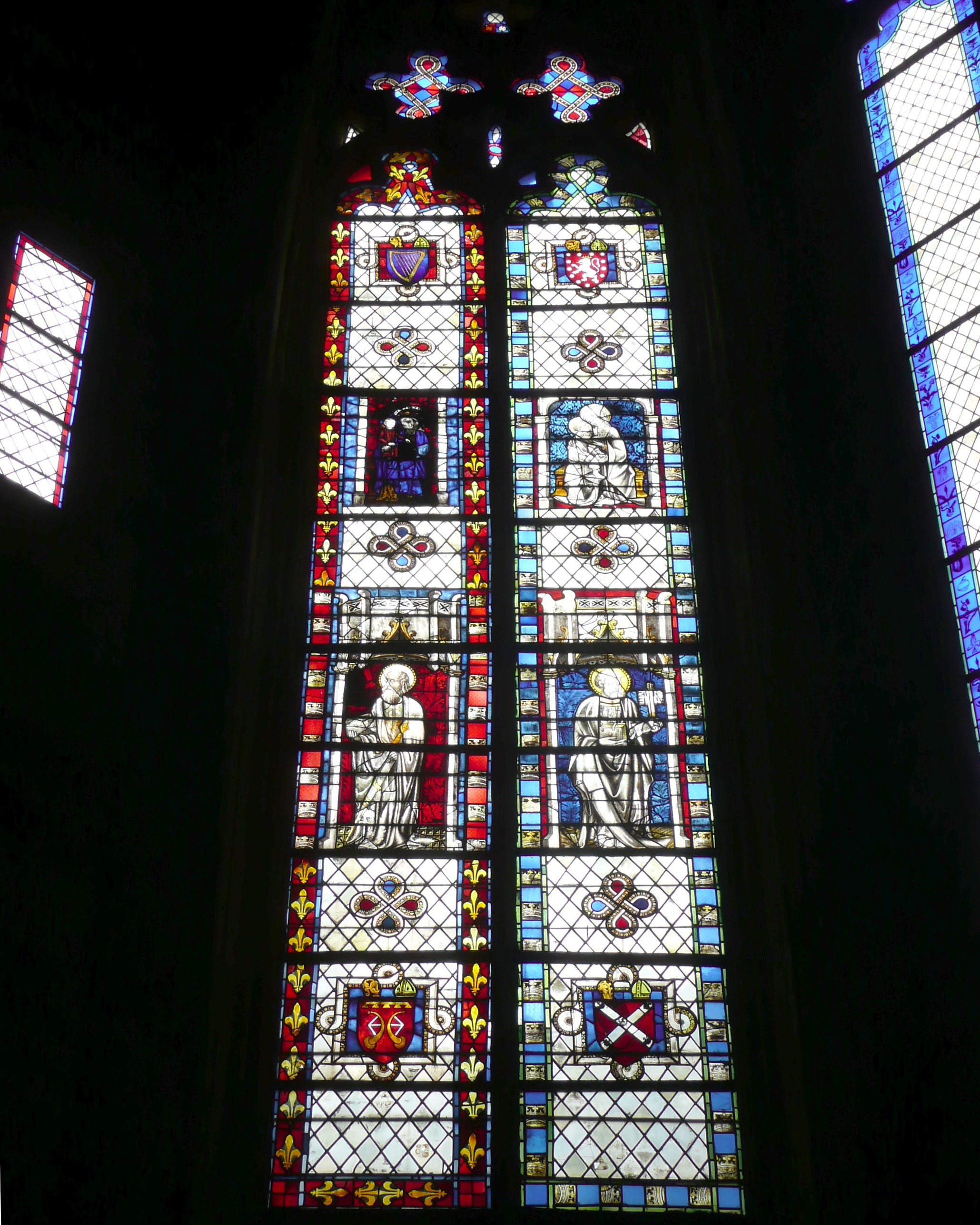
Window integrating glass from 13th and 15th centuries, St. Joseph's Chapel

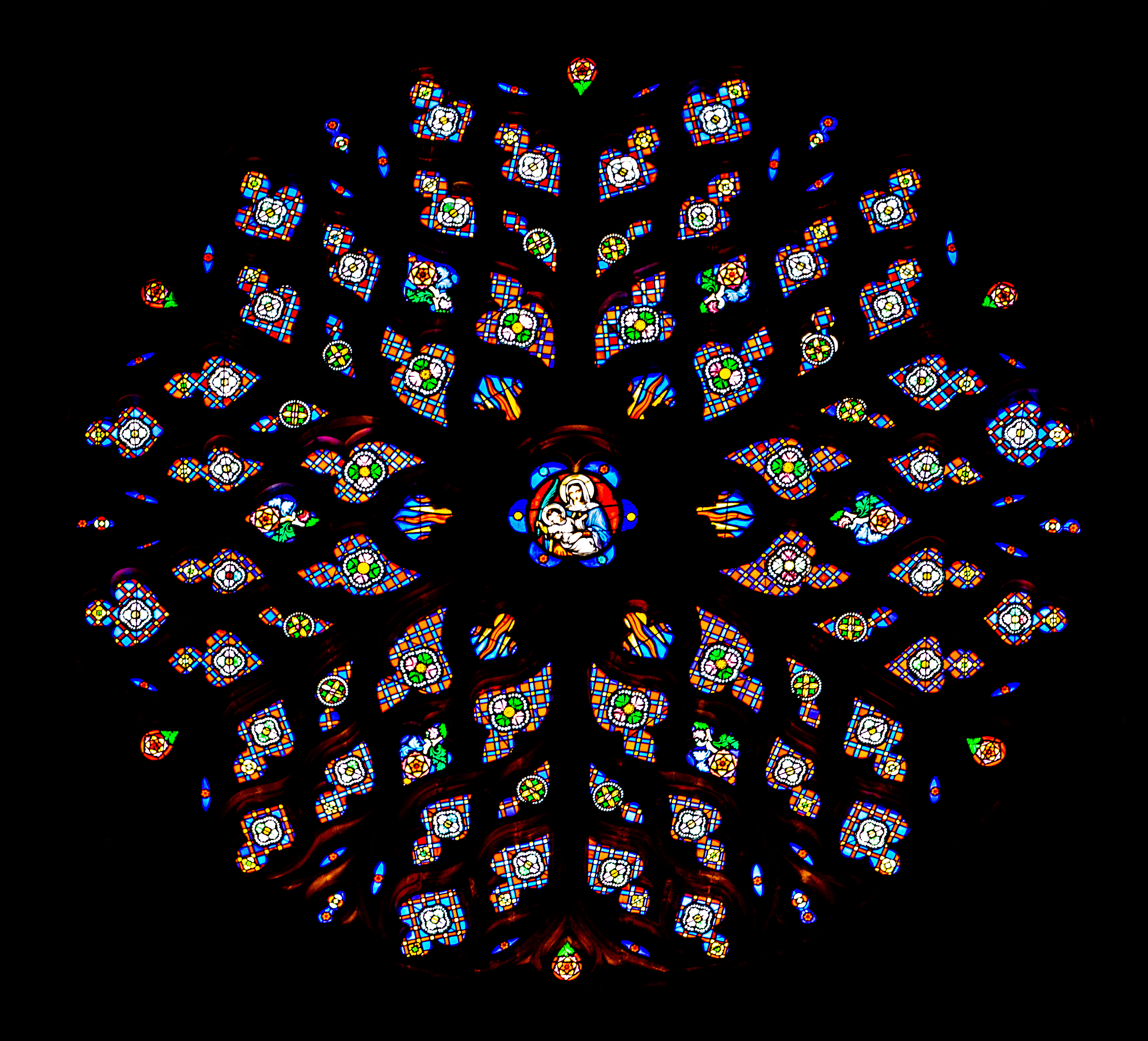
Rose window of the west front (16th century) (multiple click to see detail)

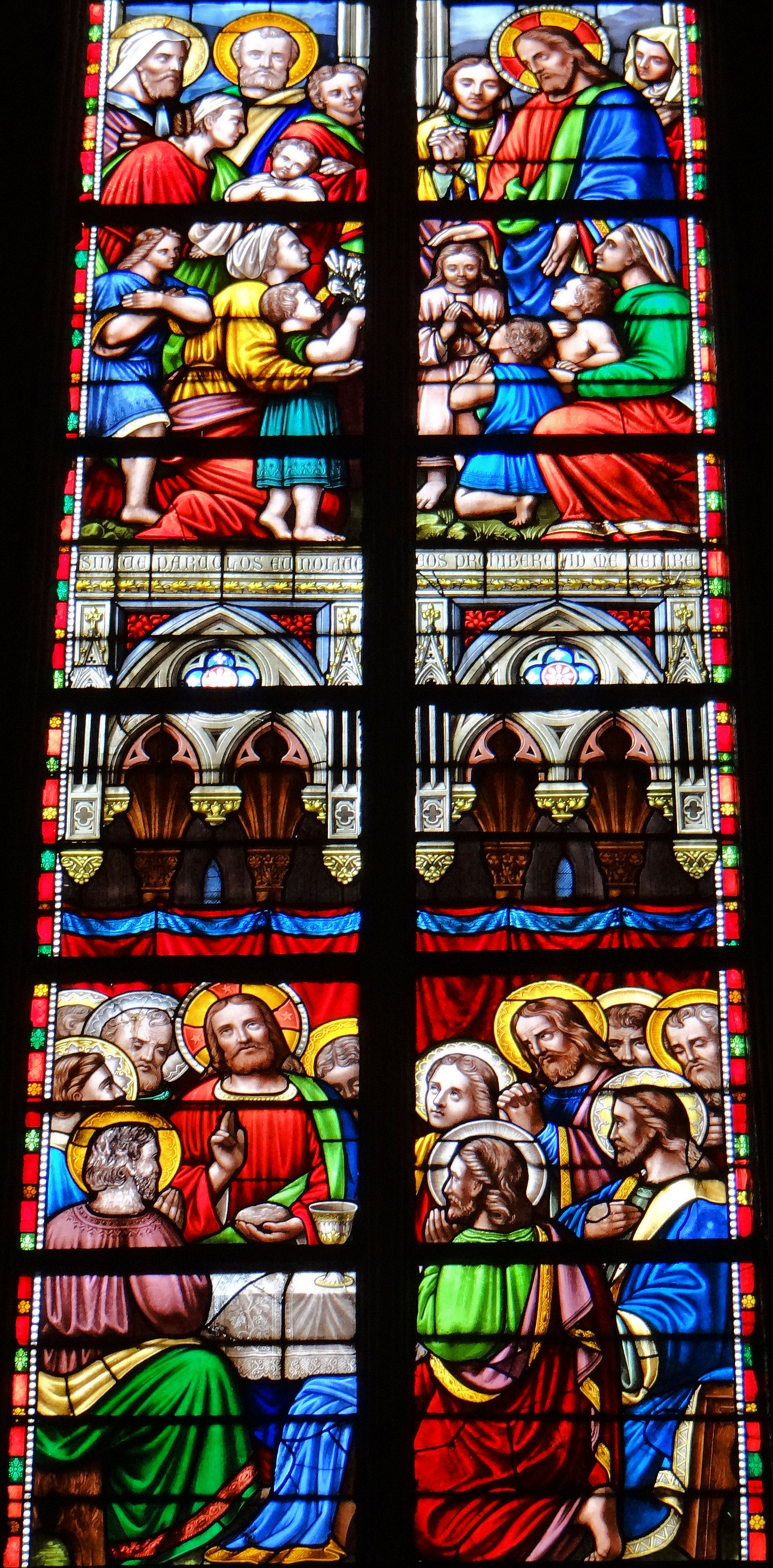
19th century window

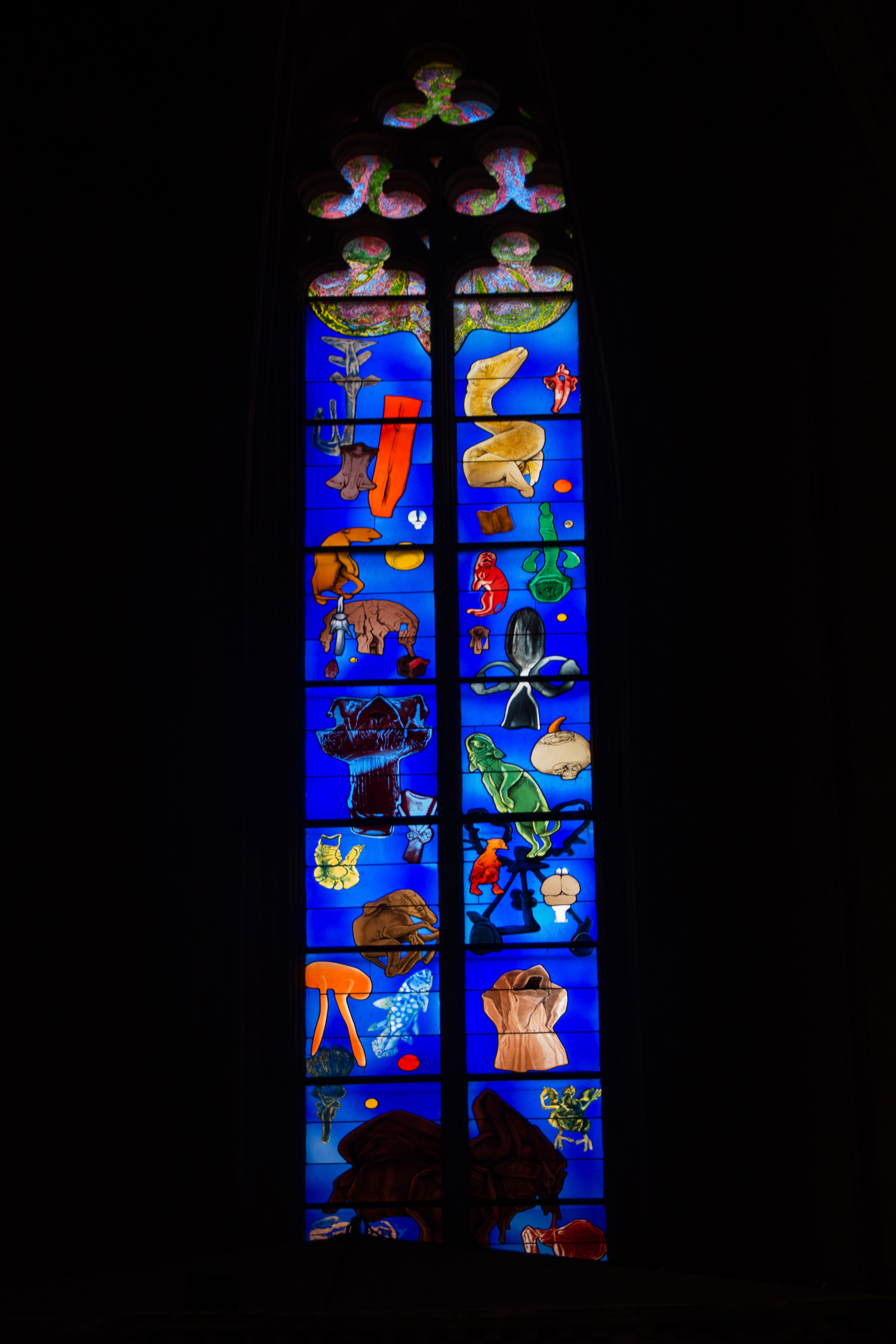
Contemporary window - "The Creation of the Elements - Water"

The cathedral has a mixture of early windows, 19th-century windows, and a series of modern windows depicting, among others, the subjects, the creation of the Elements. In some windows, early glass has been combined with more modern settings.

== Organ ==
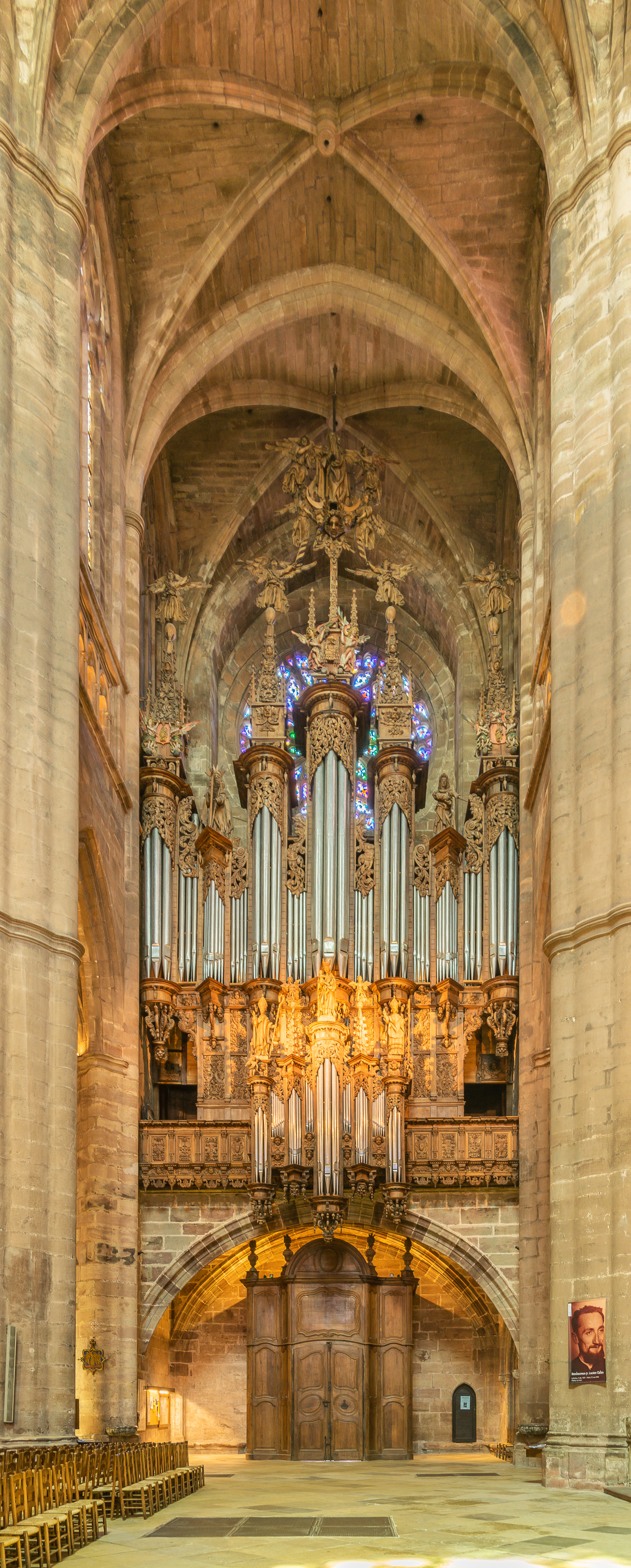

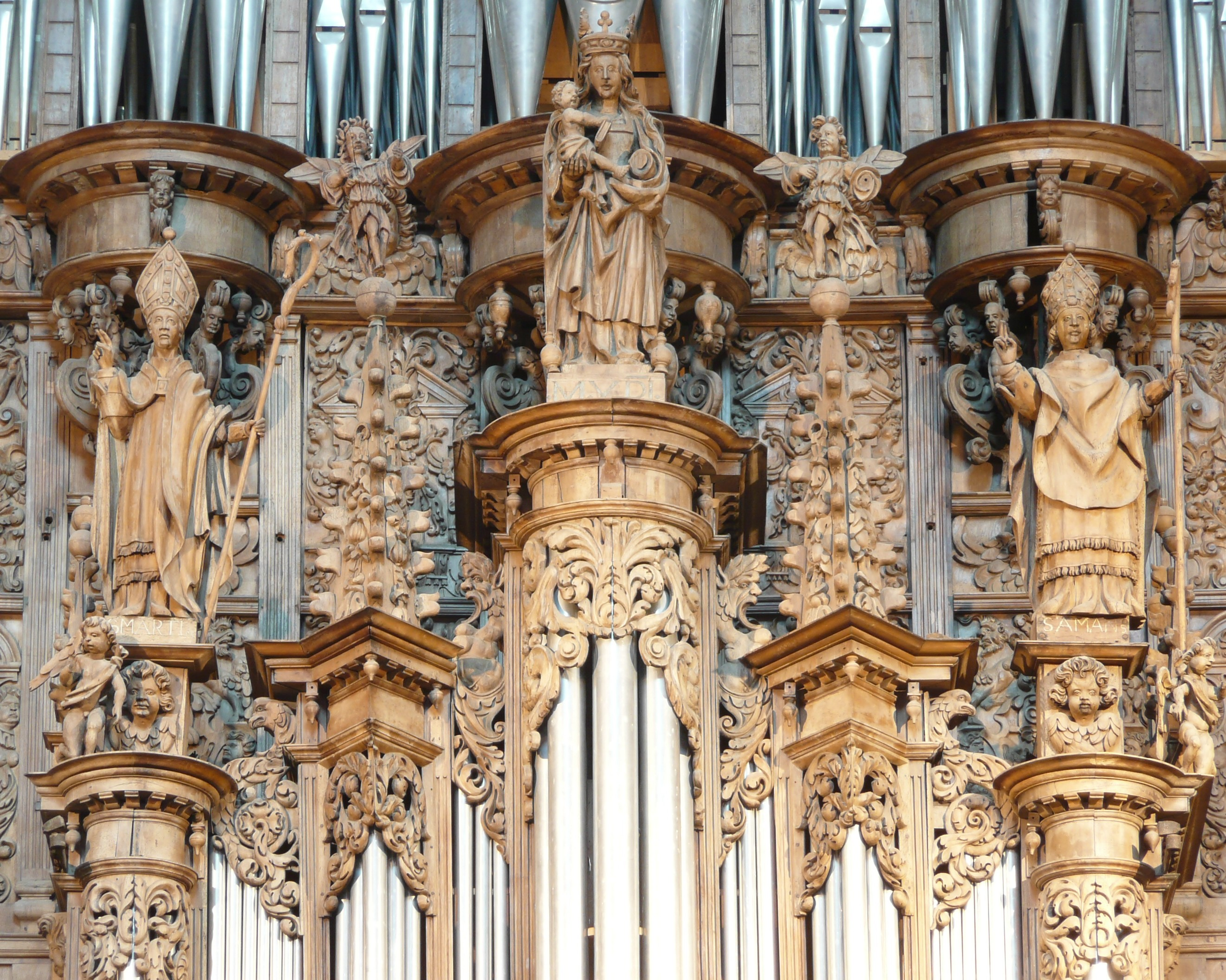

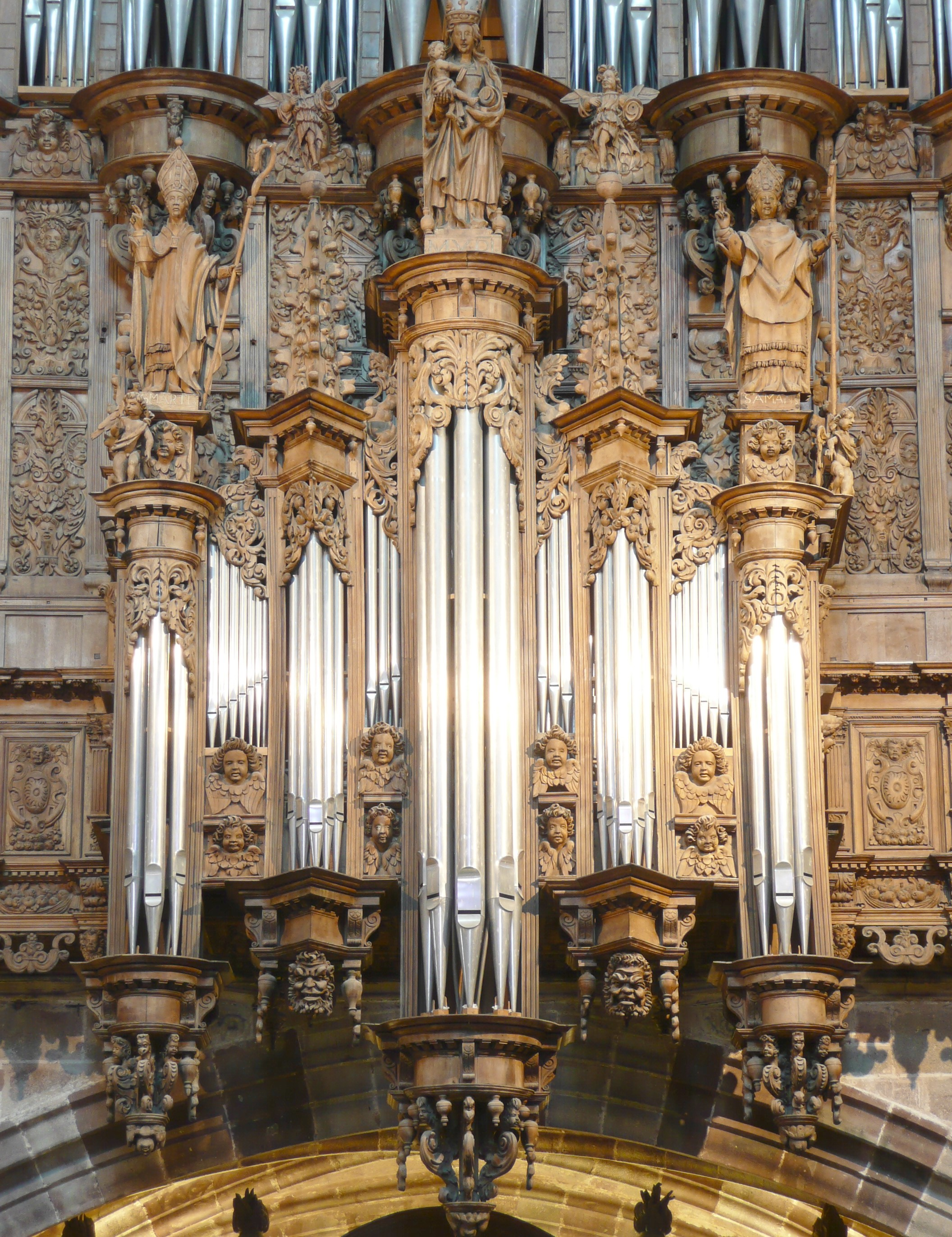

The great organ is one of the famous features of the cathedral. The buffet was constructed between 1628 and 1631 by Raymond Gusmond of Périgueux to house an organ built by Antoine Vernholles of Poitiers. The instrument was rebuilt in 1677 by Jean de Joyeuse, rebuilt again in 1902 by Charles Anneessens, then rebuilt once again in 1977 and 1986 by Jean-Georges & Yves Koenig, who returned it to the form it had had under de Joyeuse. Both the buffet and the instrument itself are protected in the list of French historic monuments.

== See also ==
- Jean Salvanh
- Antoine Salvanh
- List of Gothic cathedrals in Europe
- French Gothic architecture

== Bibliography ==
- Le Guide du Patrimoine en France (in French). Éditions du Patrimoine, Centre des Monuments Nationaux. 2002. ISBN 978-2-85822-760-0.
- Lours, Mathieu (2018). Dictionnaire des Cathédrales (in French). Éditions Jean-Paul Gisserot. ISBN 978-2755-807653.
