= Jean Deschamps (architect) =

Jean Deschamps or Johannes de Campis was a 13th-century architect, most notable as the first designer of Clermont-Ferrand Cathedral, begun in 1248, where he was buried. From the 19th century onwards a historical myth arose around him, making him the designer of several cathedrals in Southern France such as those of Limoges, Narbonne, Rodez and Toulouse.

== Life ==
He contributed to introducing northern Gothic architecture in southern France. Based on an inscription recorded by Jean Dufraisse in the 18th century, he was definitely the designer of Clermont-Ferrand Cathedral, begun in 1248.

He drew upon the repertoire of northern Gothic to produce an original synthesis with variations noted by Alain Erlande-Brandenburg. He seems to have been familiar with the apse of Beauvais Cathedral, the rayonnant chapels of Cambrai Cathedral, the water removal system of the Basilica of Saint-Denis, and the doors to Notre Dame Cathedral.

Archival research has revealed a Jean Deschamps or master builders of that name who designed several buildings of that era, in particular a Jean Deschamps who contributed to building the apse of Narbonne Cathedral in 1286. Some of that research was by Eugène Viollet-le-Duc, who built a legend around Jean Deschamps. Heavily critiqued, that legend has led to other buildings associated with the fairly common name Deschamps to be attributed to an entire family of architects:

- Jean Deschamps at Narbonne Cathedral (attested in 1286, eventually the same as the former)
- Jean and Bertrand at Bordeaux Cathedral (before 1309 and in 1320)
- Guillaume at Rodez Cathedral (1355)
- Pierre at Clermont Cathedrral (mentioned as dead in 1357), which would be Jean's son or grandsons

It has also been presumed they worked on other cathedrals, such as Toulouse or Limoges

Jean Deschamps was buried before the north door of Clermont Cathedral according to 18th century chronicler Jean Dufraisse, who recorded the tomb inscription, which translates as "Let it be remembered that Master Jean Deschamps began this church in the year of our Lord 1248, who lies here with his wife and their children in a tomb cut before the door of the Blessed Virgin Mary of Grace. This memory was extracted from a certain stone which is within the said tomb, written in leaden letters, in the year of our Lord 1448".

== Bibliography (in French) ==
- Charles Bauchal, Nouveau Dictionnaire biographique et critique des architectes français, Librairie générale de l'architecture et des travaux publics, Paris, 1887, p. 178 (Online)
- Anne Courtillé, La cathédrale de Clermont, Créer, Nonette, 1994, ISBN 2-902894-94-5, p. 44-45 (aperçu)
- Alain Erlande-Brandenburg, « Deschamps Jean (2e moitié du XIIIe siècle », in Dictionnaire des architectes, Encyclopædia Universalis, Albin Michel, Paris, 1999, (ISBN 2-226-10952-8), p. 211-212
- Frédérique Constantini, « Jean Deschamps », edited by Pascale Charron and Jean-Marie Guillouët, Dictionnaire d'histoire de l'art du Moyen Âge occidental, Éditions Robert Laffont, Paris, 2009, ISBN 978-2-221-10325-8, p. 489
- Christian Freigang, « Jean Deschamps et le Midi », Bulletin Monumental, 149-III, 1991, p. 265-298 Online version.
- Raymond Rey, L’Art gothique du Midi de la France, Paris, H. Laurens, 1934.
- Thierry Soulard, « Jean Deschamps et sa descendance : les cathédrales de Clermont, Bordeaux et Limoges », Materiam superabat opus, Hommage à Alain Erlande-Brandenburg, Agnès Bos, Xavier Dectot, Jean-Michel Leniaud, Philippe Plagnieux (ed.s), Paris, École nationale des Chartes - Réunion des Musées Nationaux, 2006, 453 p., p. 359-367. ISBN 9782711850235
