= Yurt =

Portable, round tent covered with skins or felt

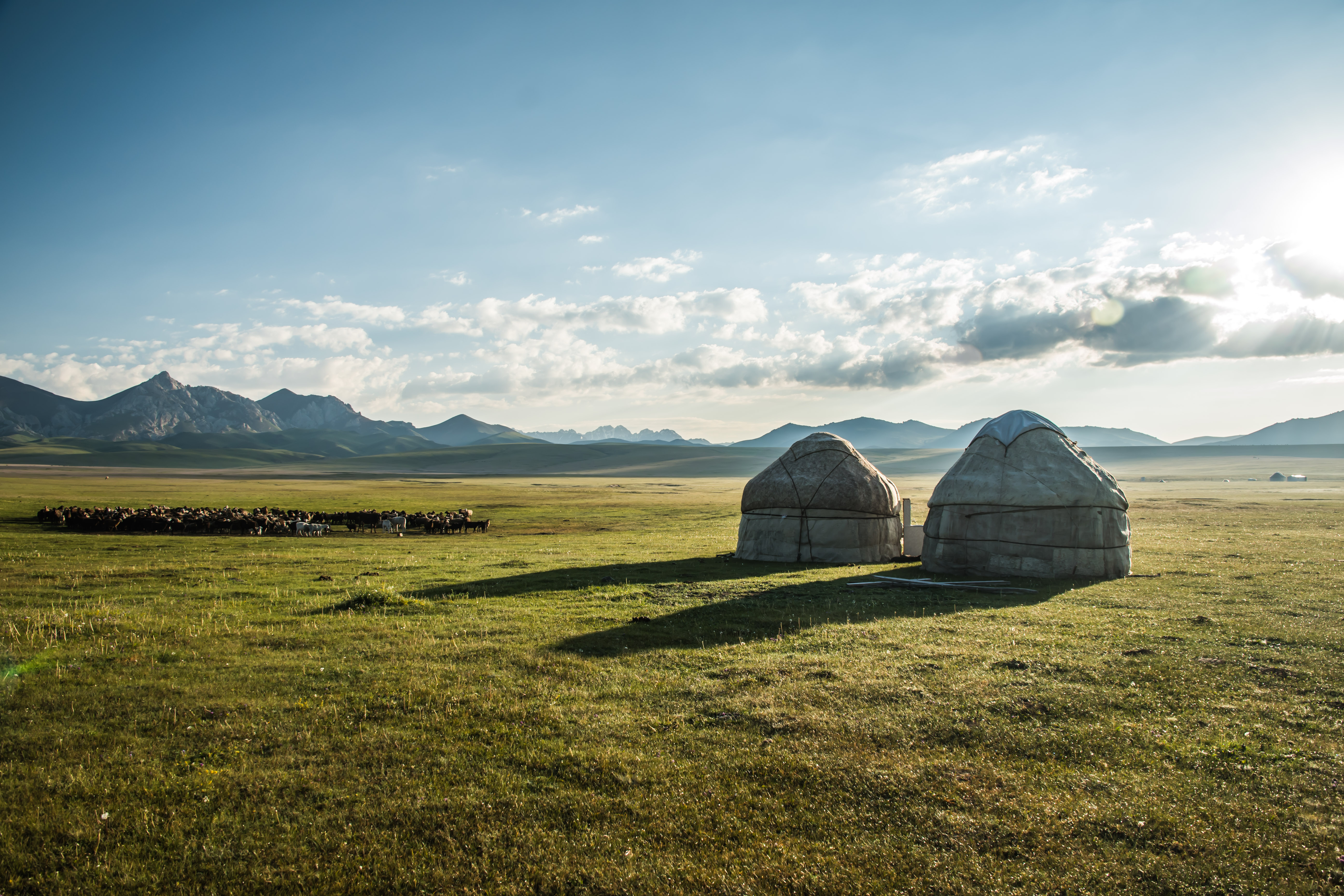
A traditional Kyrgyz yurt

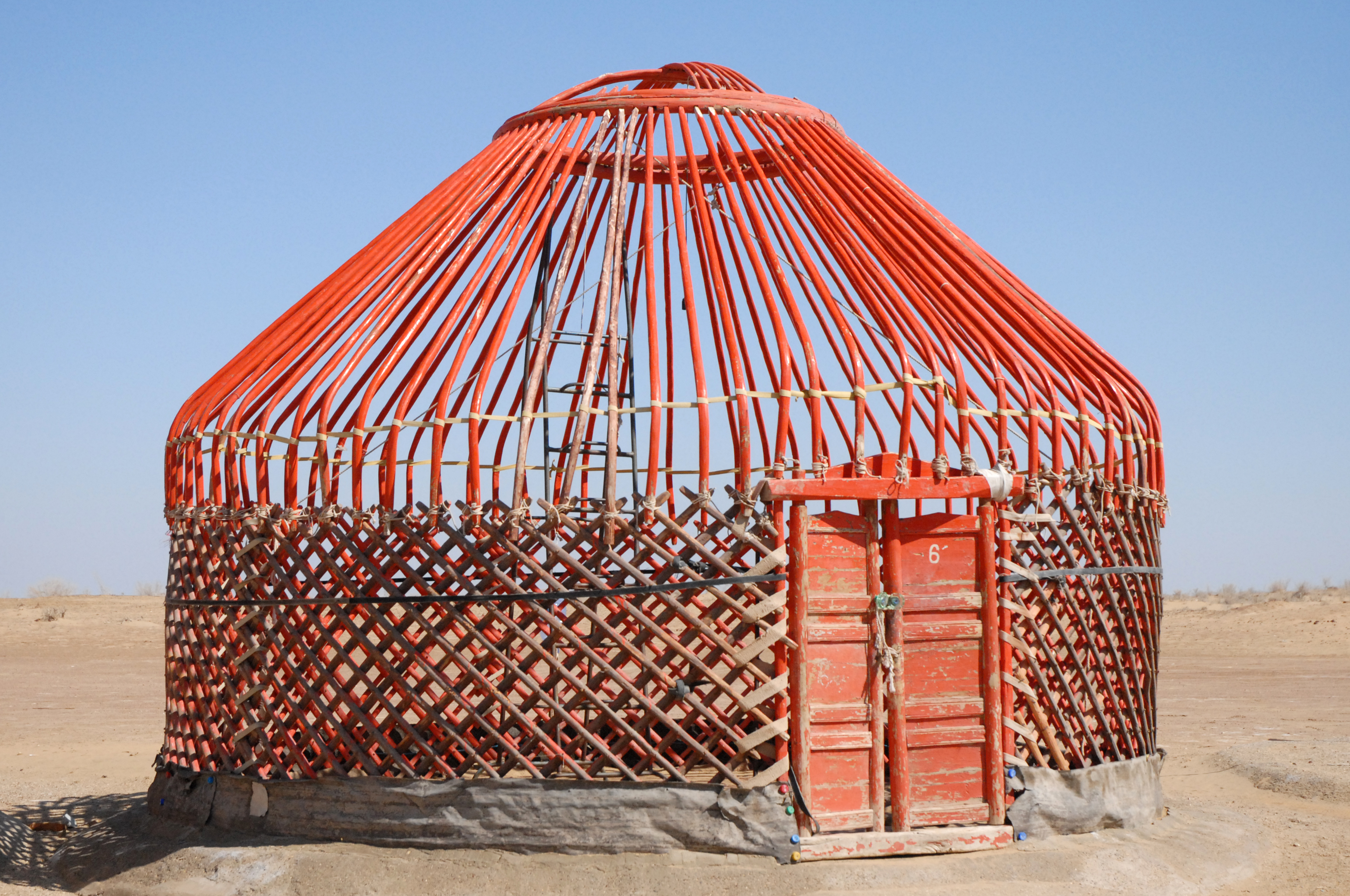
A Karakalpak bentwood type "yourte" in Khwarezm (or Karakalpakstan), Uzbekistan

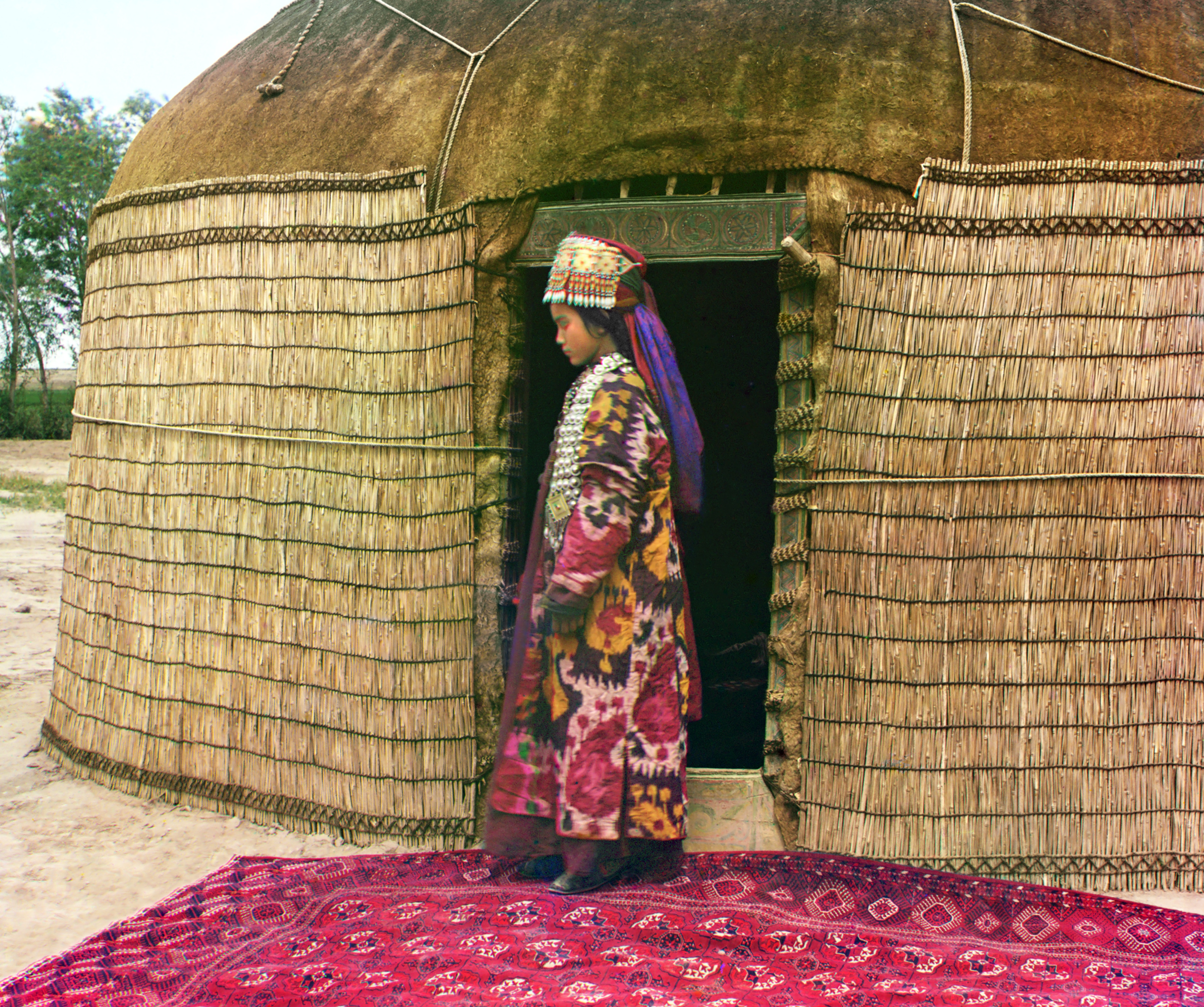
Turkmen woman at the entrance to a yurt in Turkestan; 1913 picture by Prokudin-Gorsky

A yurt (/jɜːrt/; from the Turkic languages) or ger (/ɡɛər/; from the Mongolic languages) is a portable, round tent covered and insulated with skins or felt and traditionally used as a dwelling by several distinct nomadic groups in the steppes and mountains of Inner Asia. The structure consists of a flexible angled assembly or latticework of wood or bamboo for walls, a door frame, ribs (poles, rafters), and a wheel (crown, compression ring) possibly steam-bent as a roof. The roof structure is sometimes self-supporting, but large yurts may have interior posts or columns supporting the crown. The top of the wall of self-supporting yurts is prevented from spreading by means of a tension band, which opposes the force of the roof ribs. Yurts take between 30 minutes and 3 hours to set up or take down, and are generally used by 5–15 people. Nomadic farming with yurts as housing has been the primary way of life in Central Asia, particularly Mongolia, for thousands of years.

Modern yurts may be permanently built on a wooden or concrete platform; they may use modern materials such as metal framing, plastics, plexiglass dome, or radiant insulation.

== Terminology ==
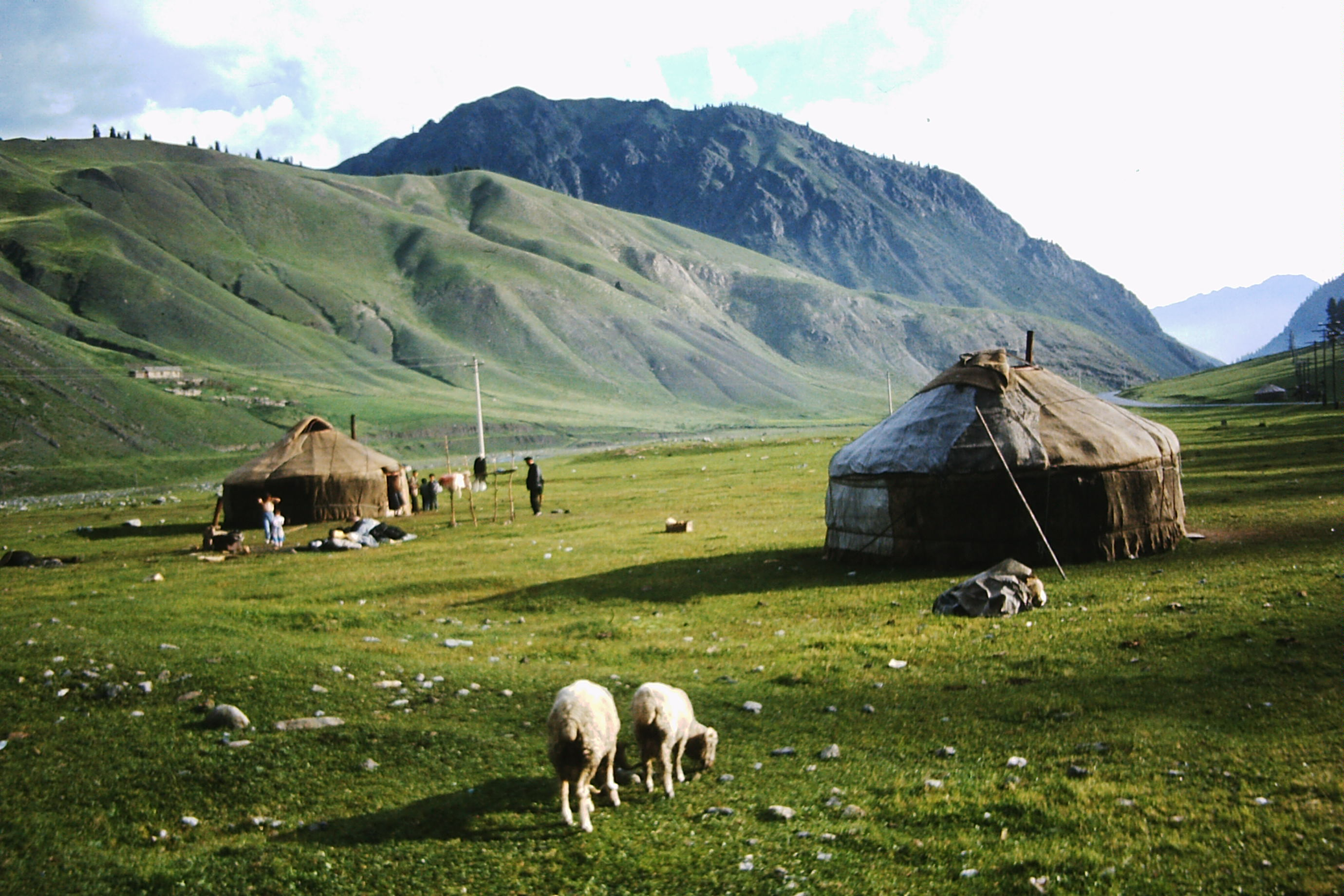
Yurt of Kazakhs in the Tian Shan, 200 km northeast of Urumqi at 2100 m a.s.l., August 1991

The Old Turkic yurt ('tent, dwelling, abode, range') may have been derived from the Old Turkic word ur—a verb with the suffix +Ut. In modern Turkish and Uzbek, the word yurt is used as the synonym for 'homeland' or a 'dormitory', while in modern Azerbaijani, yurd mainly signifies 'homeland' or 'motherland'. In Russian, the structure is called yurta (Russian: юрта), whence the word came into English.

=== Other terms ===
- Black house (Karakalpak: qara u‘y [qɑɾɑ́ ʉɪ̯]; Tajik: хонаи сиёҳ, IPA: [χɔˈnaɪˑ sɪˈjɔɦ]; Turkmen: gara öý, IPA: [ɢɑˈɾɑ œj])
- Felt house (Kazakh: киіз үй / kiız üi, IPA: [kʰɘjɘ́s ʉɪ̯])
- Grey house (Kyrgyz: боз үй / boz üi, IPA: [pos ʏɪ̯])
- Mongol house (Manchu: ᠮᠣᠩᡤᠣ ᠪᠣᠣ / monggo boo; Chinese: 蒙古包 / měnggǔ bāo)
- White house (Turkmen: ak öý, IPA: [ɑɢ œj])

=== Alternate names in other languages ===
- Alachyk (Azerbaijani: alaçıq; Turkish: alaçık; Bashkir: alasıq), alo alachig
- Balaghan (Yakut: балаҕан [b̥ɐɫɐˈʁɐn])
- Chador (Persian: چادر câdor [t͡ʃʰɒːˈdoɹ]; Tajik: чодар [t͡ʃʰɔˈdaɾ]; Ottoman Turkish: چتر / çadır), has several descendants
  - Shator (Hungarian: sátor [ˈʃaːtor]), now archaic
- Ger (Buryat and Mongolian: гэр, IPA: [ˈkɤr, ˈke̝r])
  - Kerege (Altay: кереге [kʰeɾeˈɣe])
- Og (Tuvan: өг / ög, IPA: [ɵɣ])
- Otagh (Ottoman Turkish: اوتاق / otağ; Uyghur: ئۇتاق, otaq, [oˈtʰɑq])
- Tirma (Tatar and Bashkir: tirmä [tʲirˈmæ])
- Yaranga, a tent-like traditional mobile home of some nomadic indigenous peoples of Russia, such as the Chukchi and the Siberian Yupiks.

=== Yurt elements ===
	Sidewall frame	Frame piece	Roof frame	Roof crown / smoke hole
Bashkir				сағыраҡ, sagyrak
Buryat	хана, khana		унь, uni	тооно, toono
Khakas				тӱнӱк, tyunyuk; тӱнӱг, tyunyug
Kazakh	кереге kerege	қанат qanat (lit. 'wing')	уық uyk	шаңырақ shangyraq
Kyrgyz				түндүк
Mongol	хана, khana		унь, uni	тооно, тооно
Tatar				төннек

== History ==
Yurts have been a distinctive feature of life in Central Asia for at least two and a half thousand years. The first written description of a yurt used as a dwelling was recorded by the ancient Greek historian Herodotus. He described yurt-like tents as the dwelling place of the Scythians, a horse-riding nomadic nation who lived in the northern Black Sea and Central Asian region from around 600 BC to AD 300.

=== Yurts beyond Central Asia ===
As popularity grew, it extended beyond Central Asia. In the 13th century, during the height of the Mongol Empire, yurts were introduced to parts of Europe and the Middle East. Marco Polo's writings even mentioned the use of yurts in the court of Kublai Khan. In more recent history, yurts have gained attention in the West for their unique aesthetics and practicality.

== Construction ==
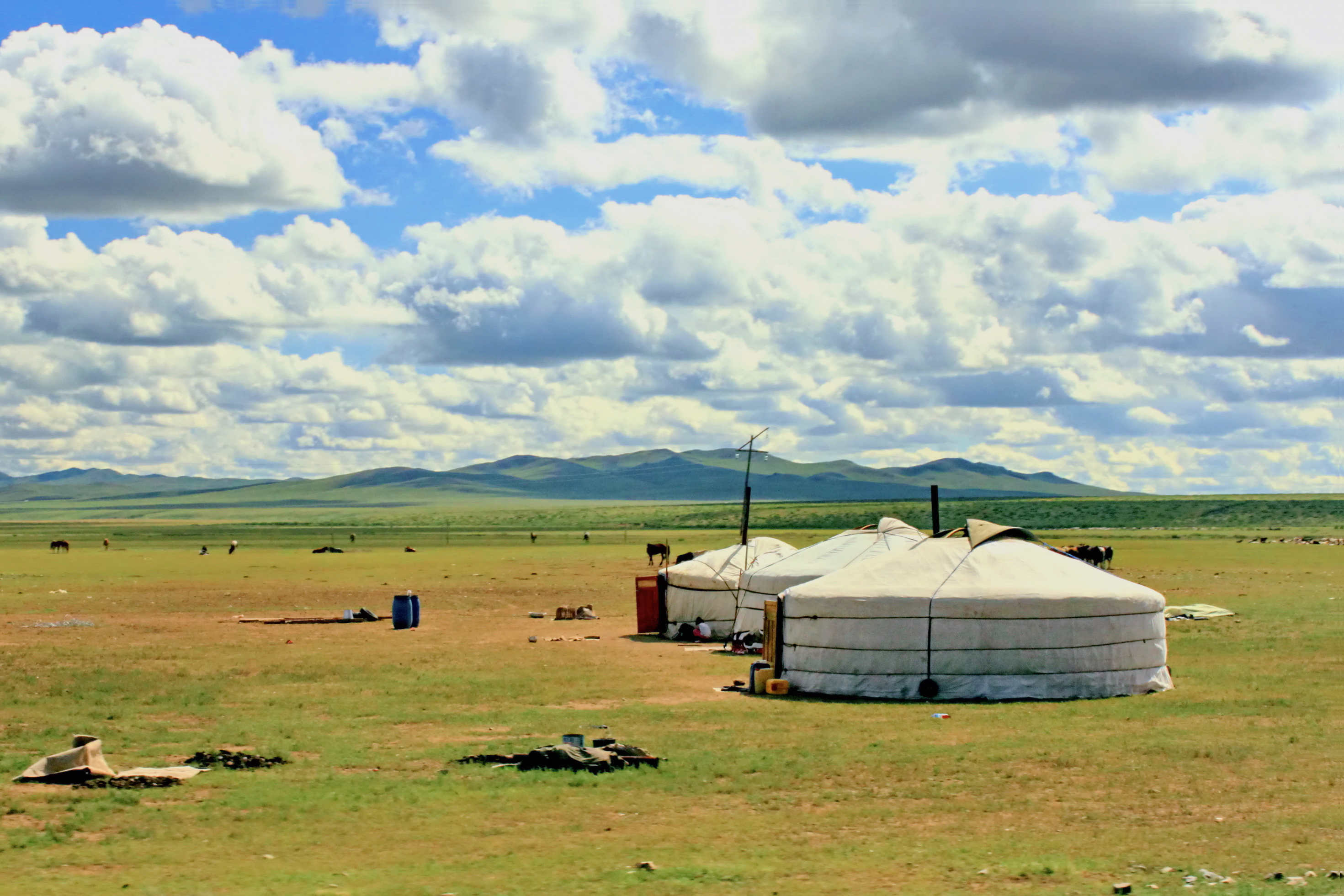
Traditional yurts on the steppes between Ulaanbaatar and Kharkhorin.

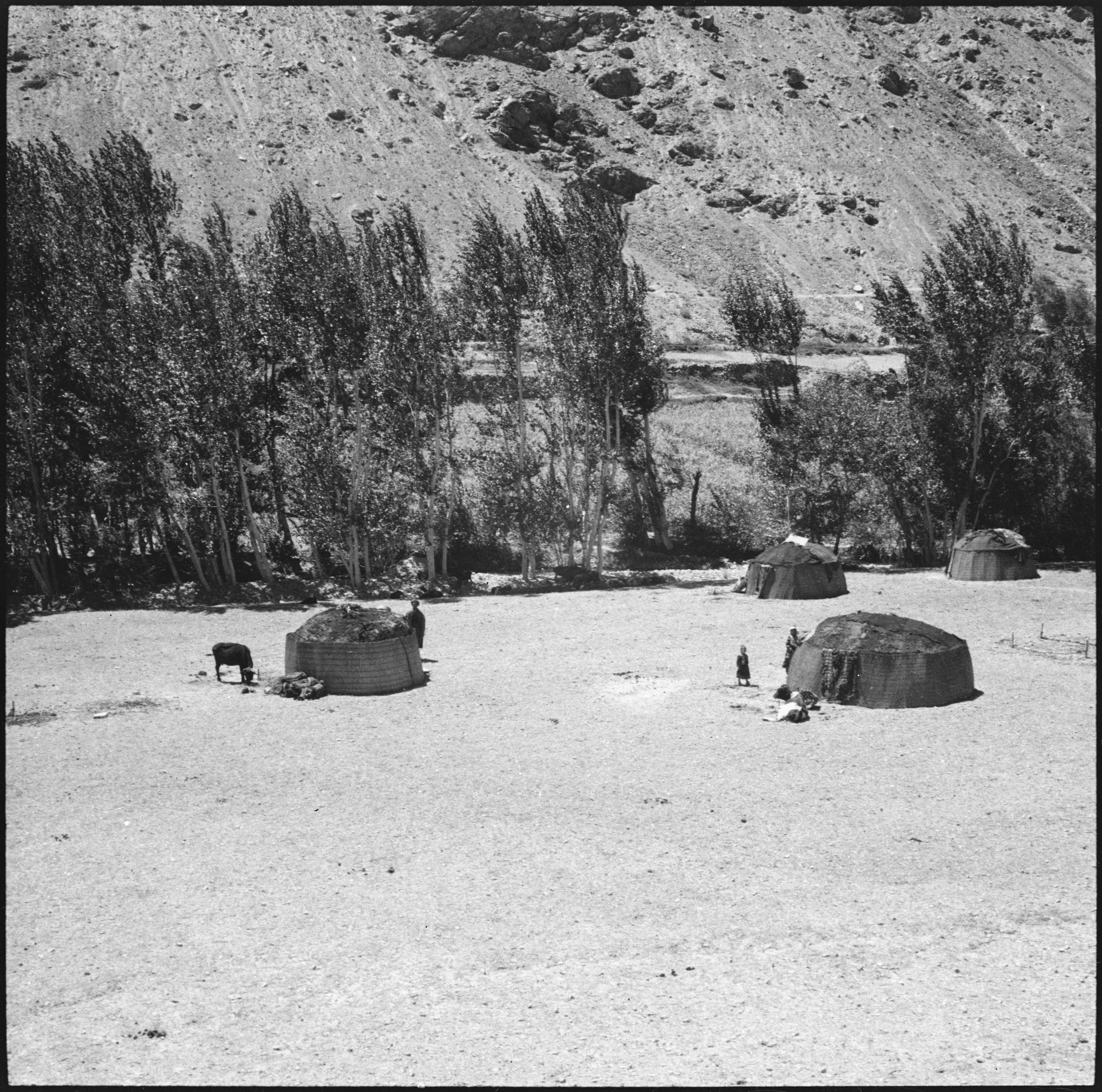
Yurts in eastern Afghanistan

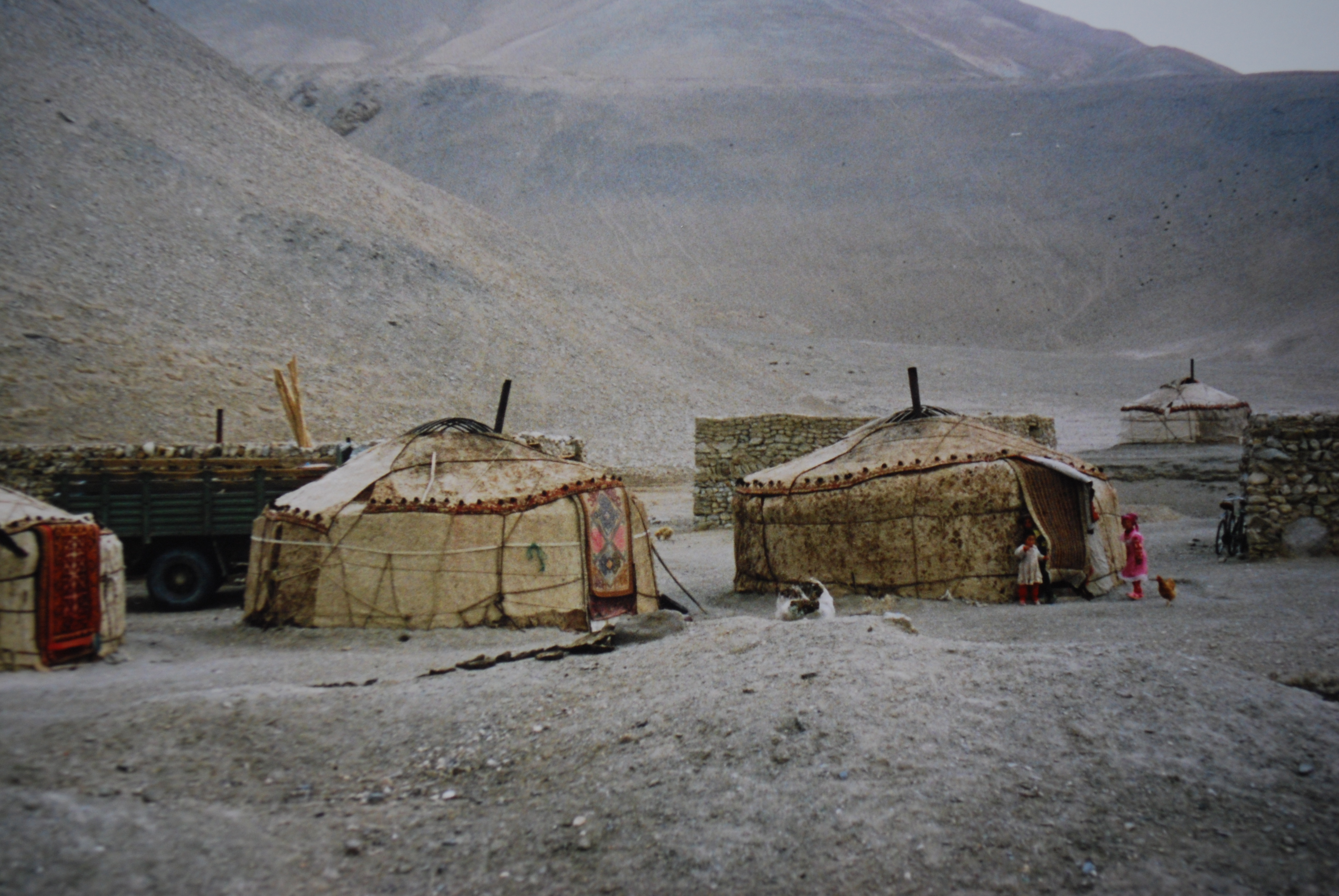
Kyrgyz yurts, Kizilsu Kyrgyz Autonomous Prefecture, Xinjiang, China

Traditional yurts consist of an expanding wooden circular frame carrying a felt cover. The felt is made from the wool of the flocks of sheep that accompany the pastoralists. The timber to make the external structure is not to be found on the treeless steppes, and must be obtained by trade in the valleys below.

The frame consists of one or more expanding lattice wall-sections, a door frame, bent roof poles, and a crown. The Mongolian ger has one or more columns to support the crown and straight roof poles. The (self-supporting) wood frame is covered with pieces of felt. Depending on availability, felt is additionally covered with canvas and/or sun covers. The frame is held together with one or more ropes or ribbons. The structure is kept under compression by the weight of the covers, sometimes supplemented by a heavy weight hung from the center of the roof. They vary in size and relative weight. They provide a large amount of insulation and protection from the outside cold of winters, and they are easily changed to keep the yurts cool for summertime.

A yurt is designed to be dismantled and the parts are carried compactly on camels or yaks to be rebuilt on another site. Complete construction takes around 2 hours.

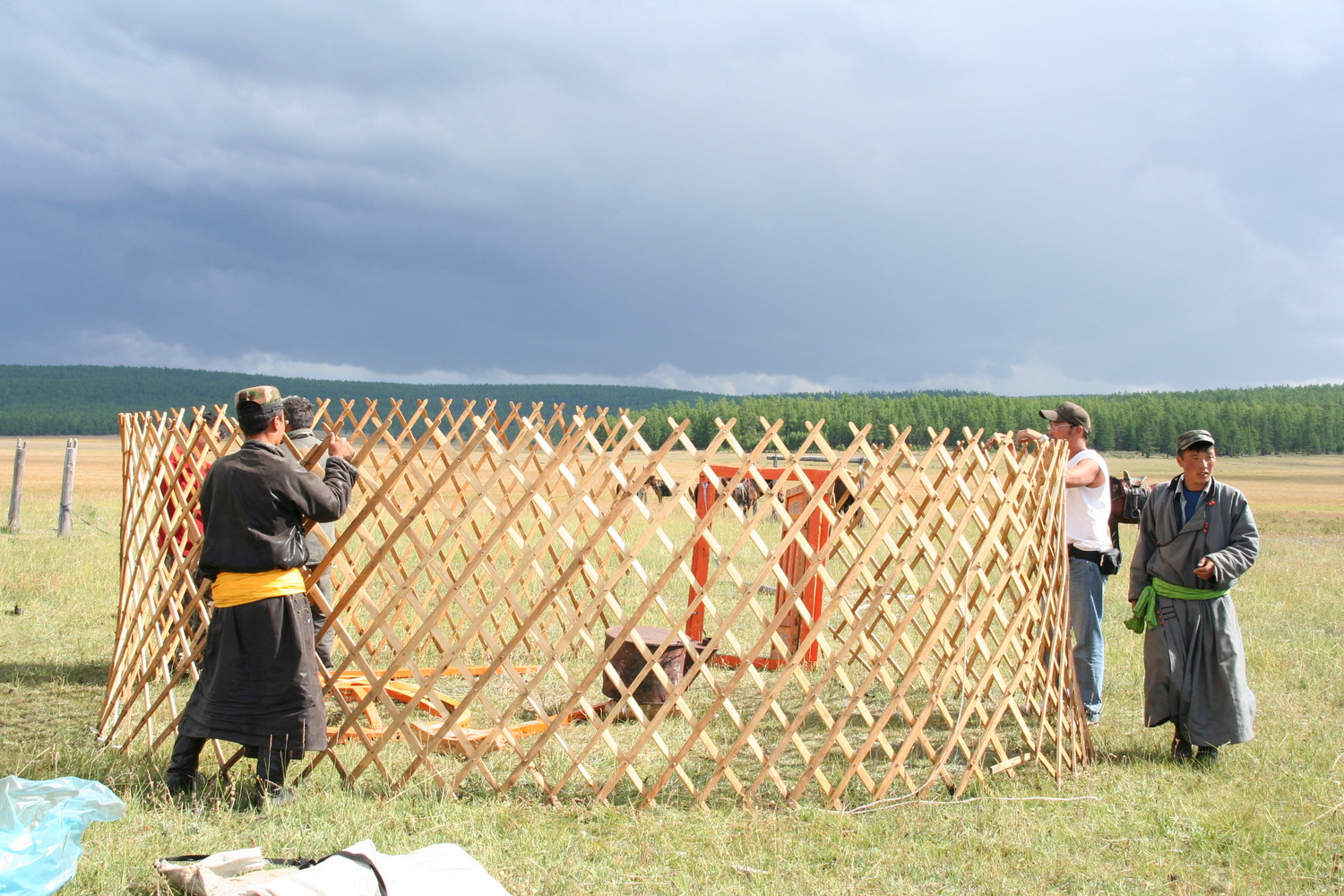
Pitching a yurt: starting with walls and door

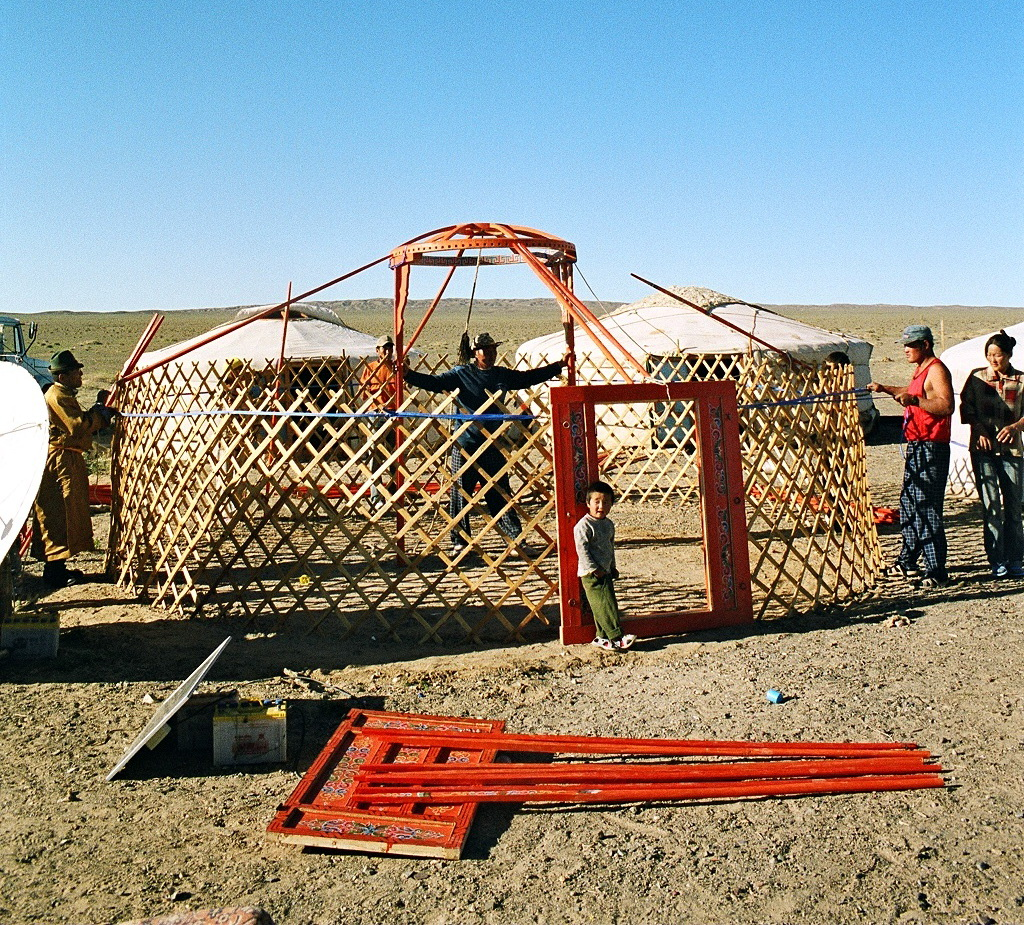
Placing of roof construction

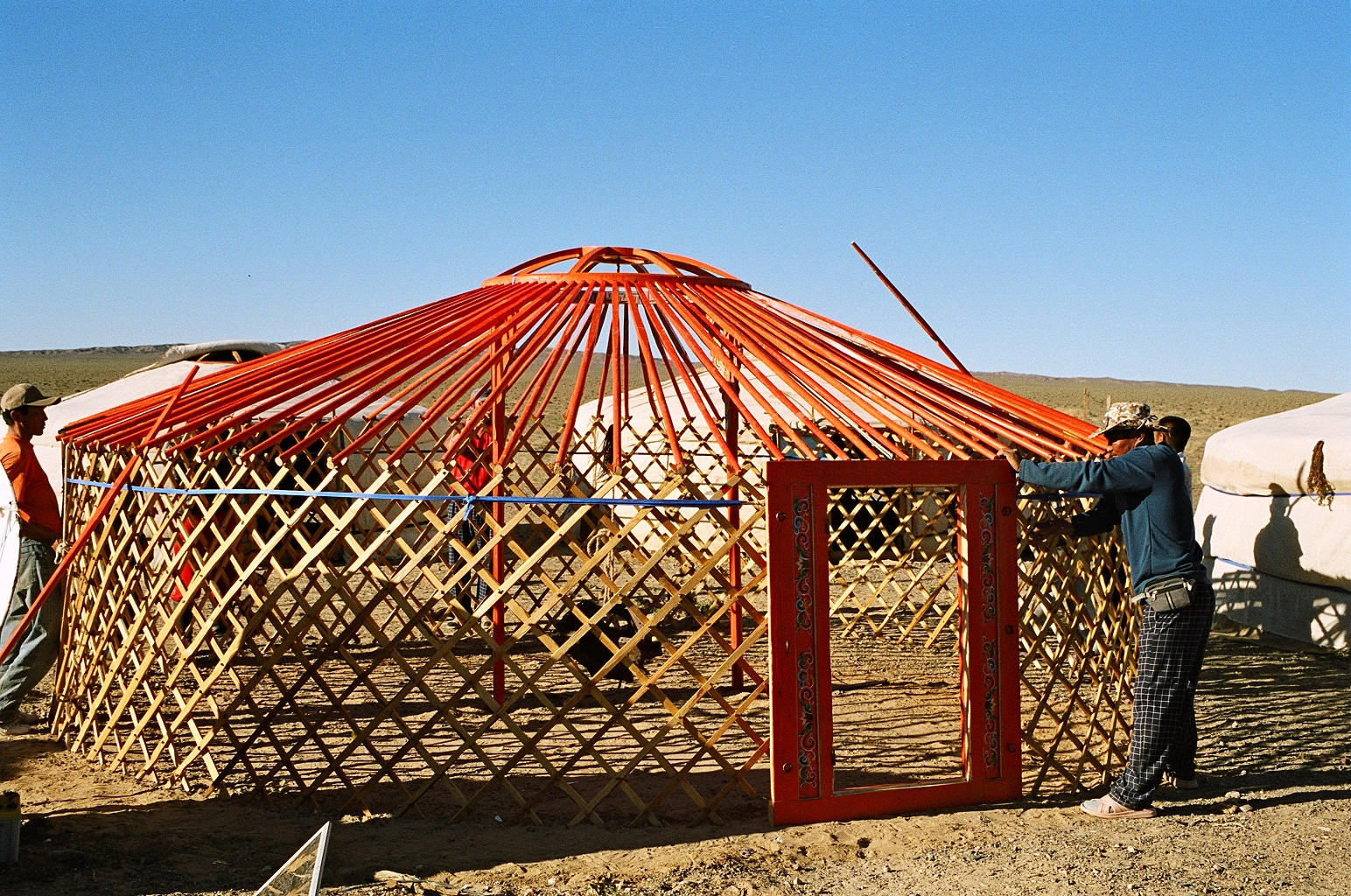
Roof construction in place with roof slopes

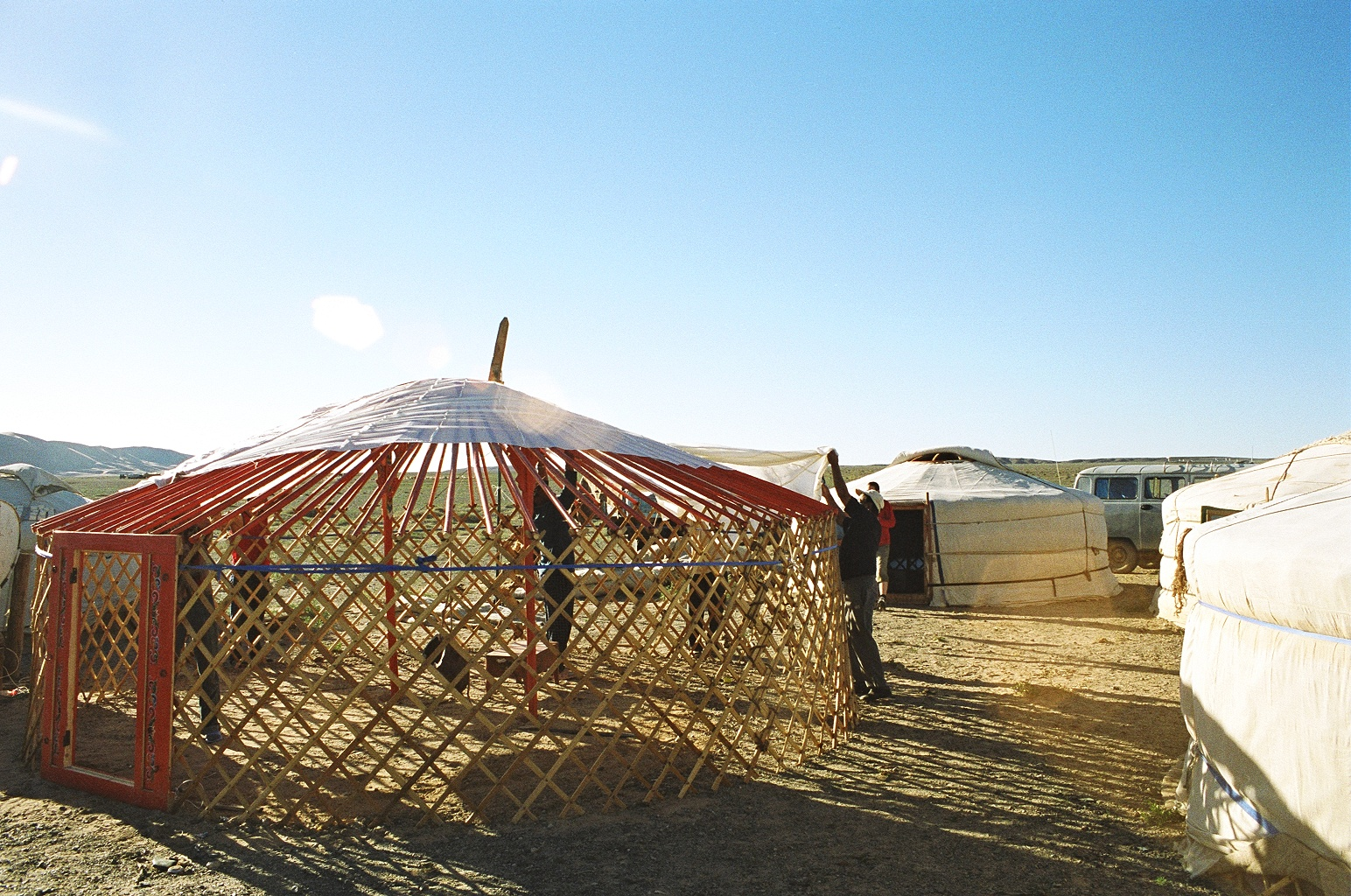
Placing the thin undercover on the roof slopes

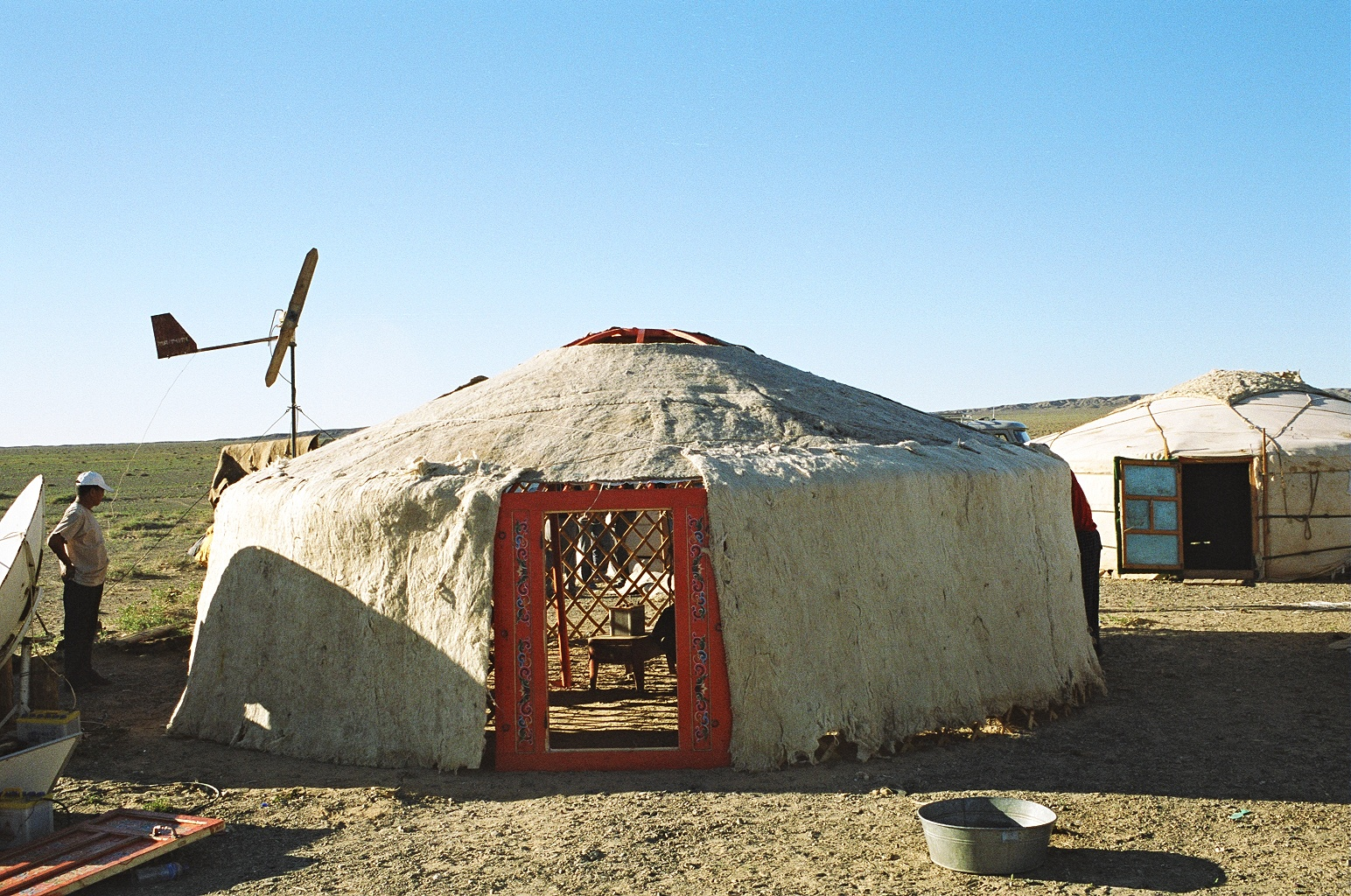
Felt cover in place

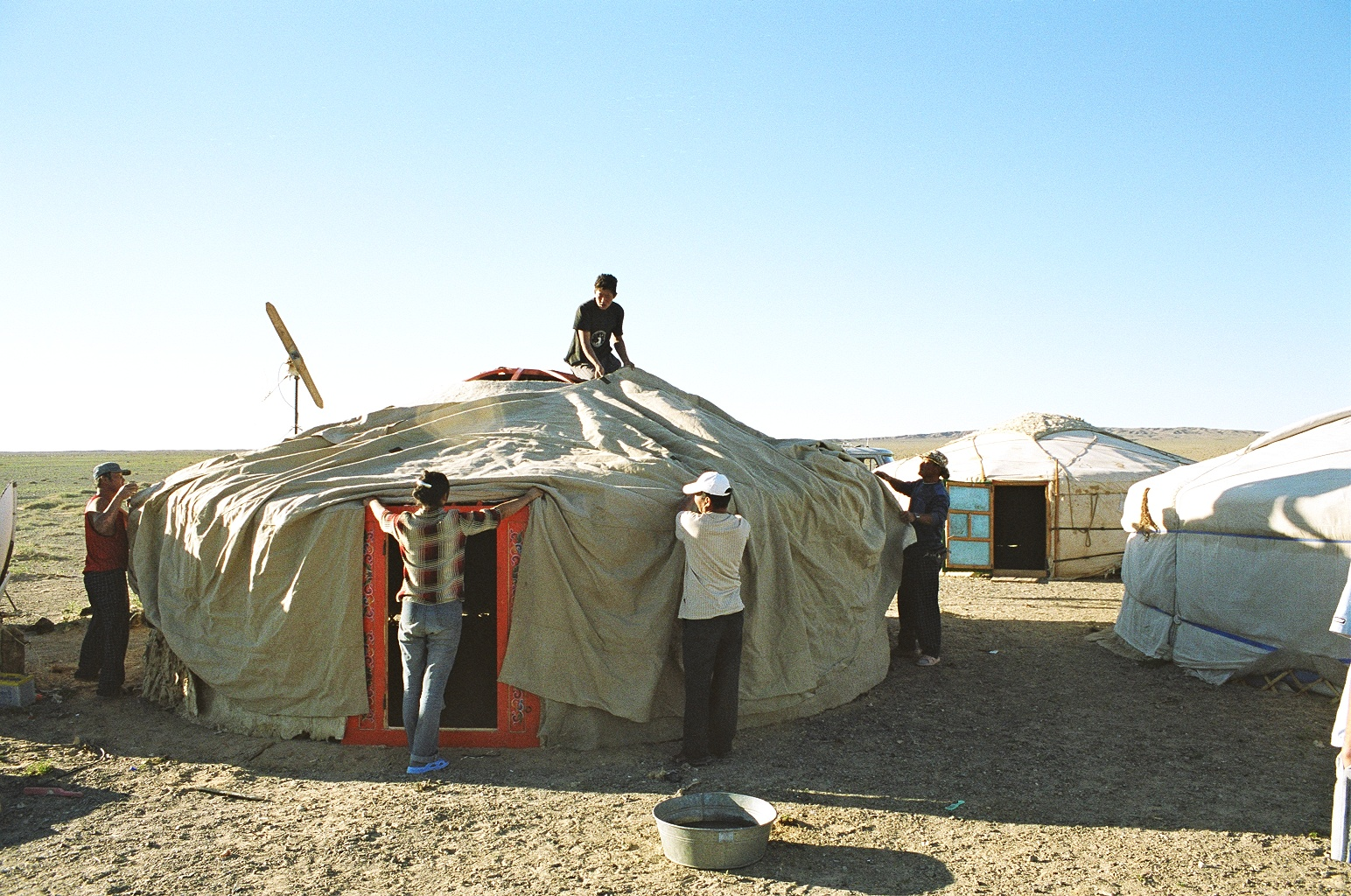
Placing the outer cover

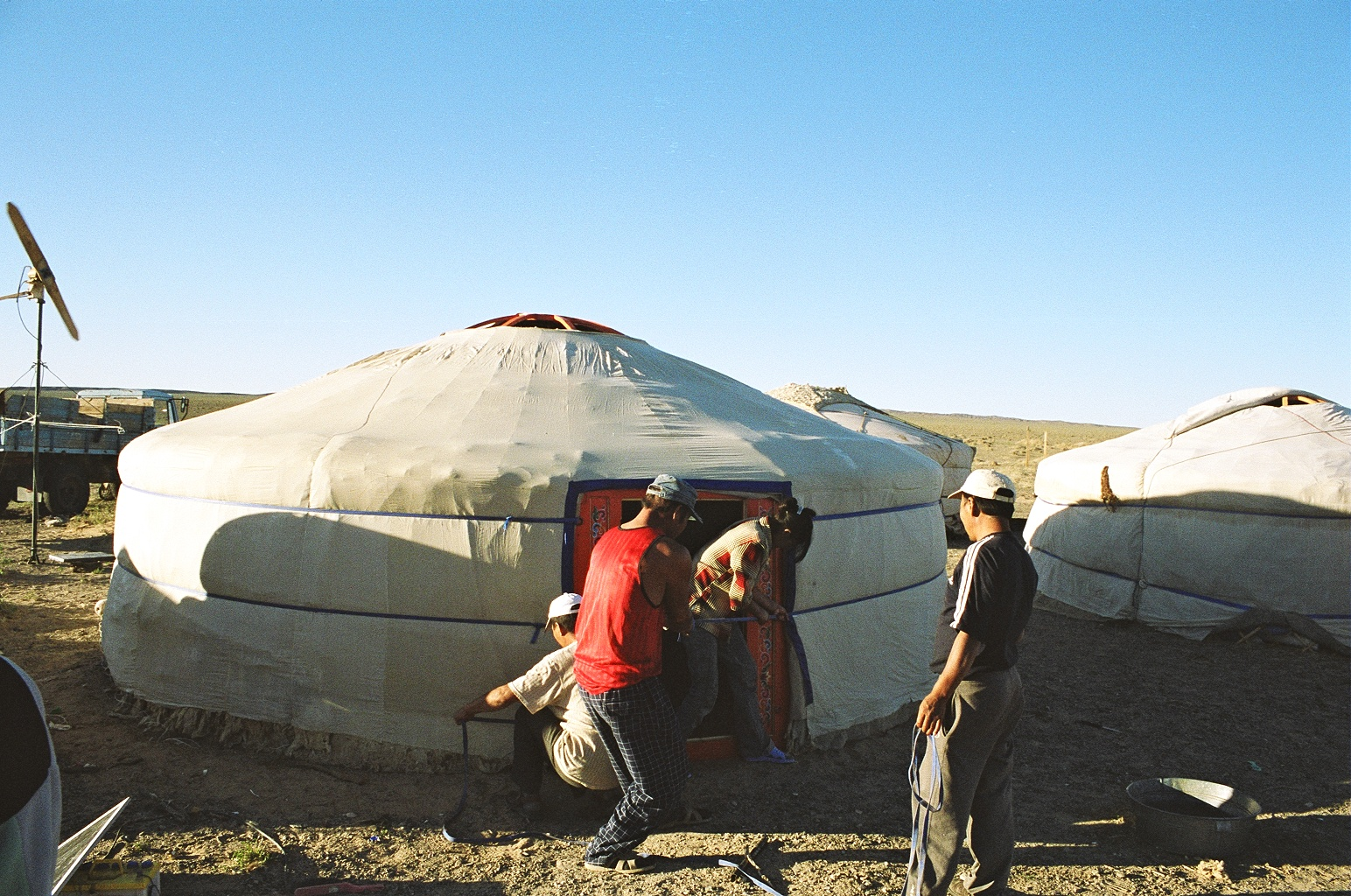
Last step: adding ropes

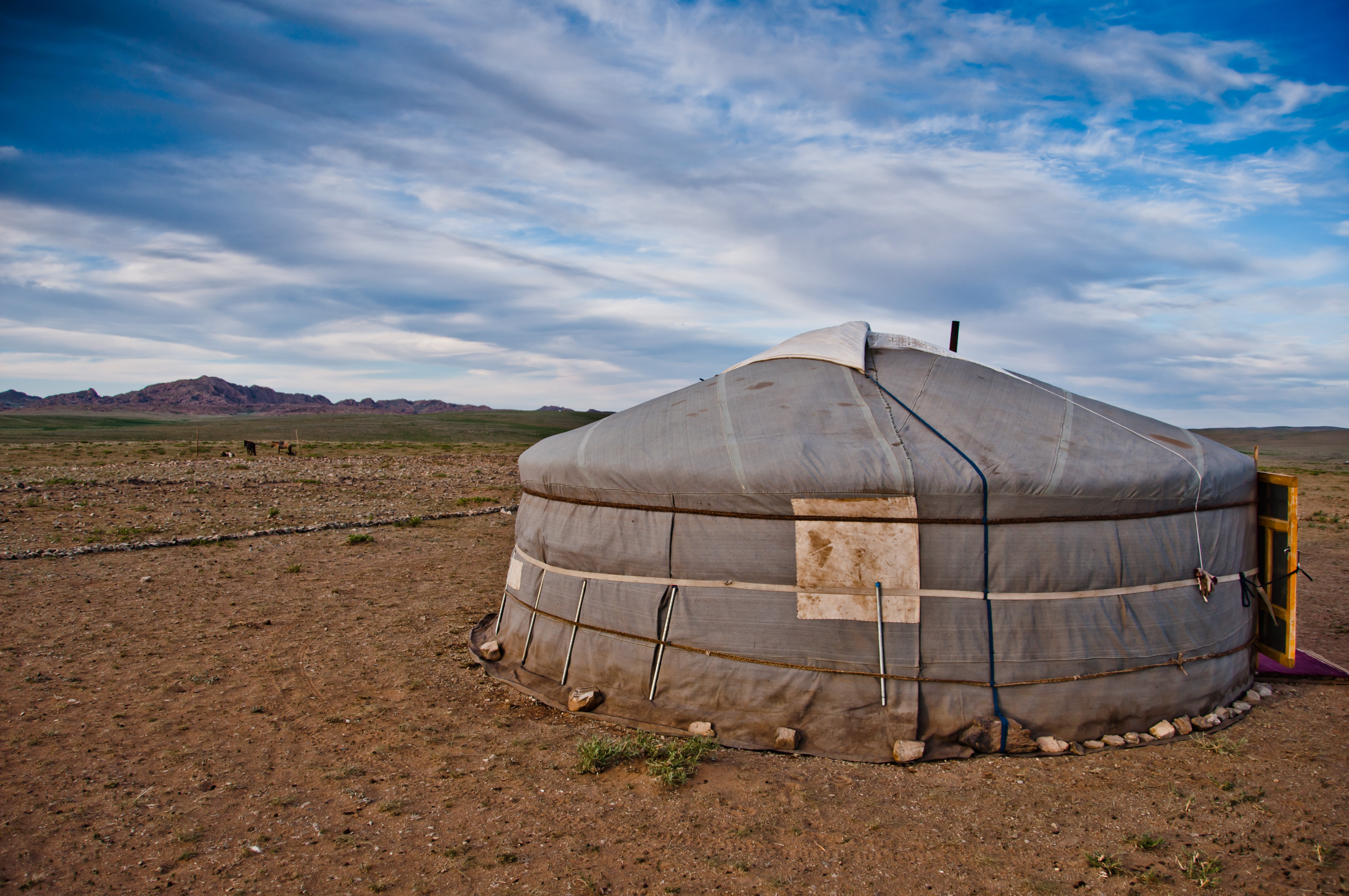
A ger sits on the steppes near Mandalgovi

== Insulation and decoration, symbolism ==
The traditional insulation and decoration within a yurt primarily consists of pattern-based woollen felted rugs. These patterns are generally not according to taste, but are derived from sacred ornaments with certain symbolism. Symbols representing strength are, for instance, the temdeg or khas (swastika), the four powerful beasts (lion, tiger, garuda – a kind of avian, and dragon), as well as stylized representations of the four elements (fire, water, earth, and air), considered to be the fundamental, unchanging elements of the cosmos. Such patterns are commonly used in the home with the belief that they will bring strength and offer protection.

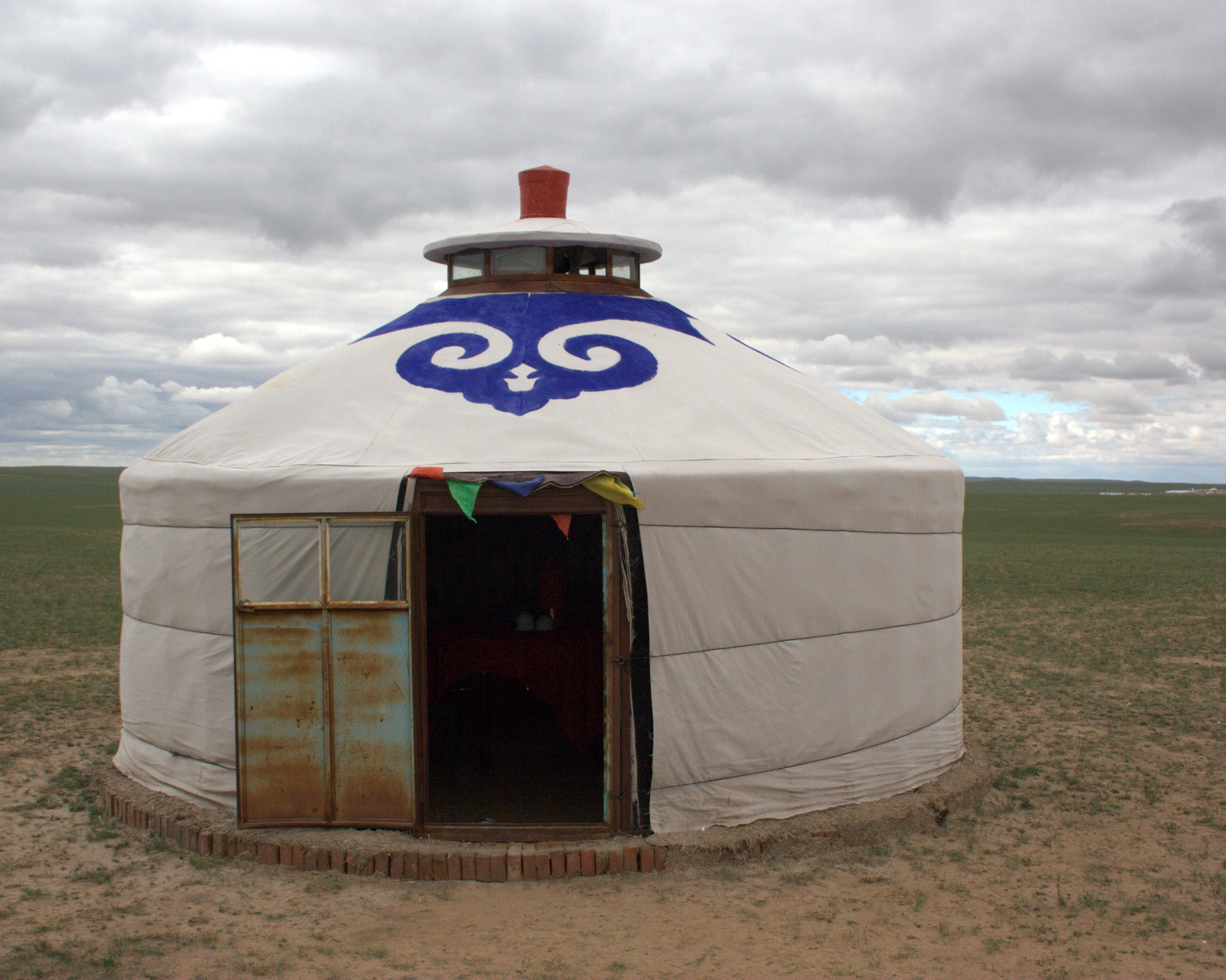
'Cloud collar' motif on the roof of a Mongolian yurt

Traditional Mongol yurts often feature a four-lobed 'cloud collar' motif derived from the Chinese yunjian. This pattern, cut from fabric and placed around the apex of the yurt, is thought to symbolise a "sky gate" to the heavens, and it frames the opening created by the smoke hole in the tent's roof.

Repeating geometric patterns are also widely used, like the continuous hammer or walking pattern (alkhan khee). Commonly used as a border decoration, it represents unending strength and constant movement. Another common pattern is the ulzii, a symbol of long life and happiness. The khamar ugalz (nose pattern) and ever ugalz (horn pattern) are derived from the shape of the animal's nose and horns, and are the oldest traditional patterns. All patterns can be found among not only the yurts themselves, but also on embroidery, furniture, books, clothing, doors, and other objects.

In Kyrgyz felted rug manufacturing the most common patterns are the Ala kiyiz and Shyrdak. Ornaments are visualising good wishes or blessings of the makers to a daughter who gets married, to children, or grandchildren.

=== In Central Asia ===
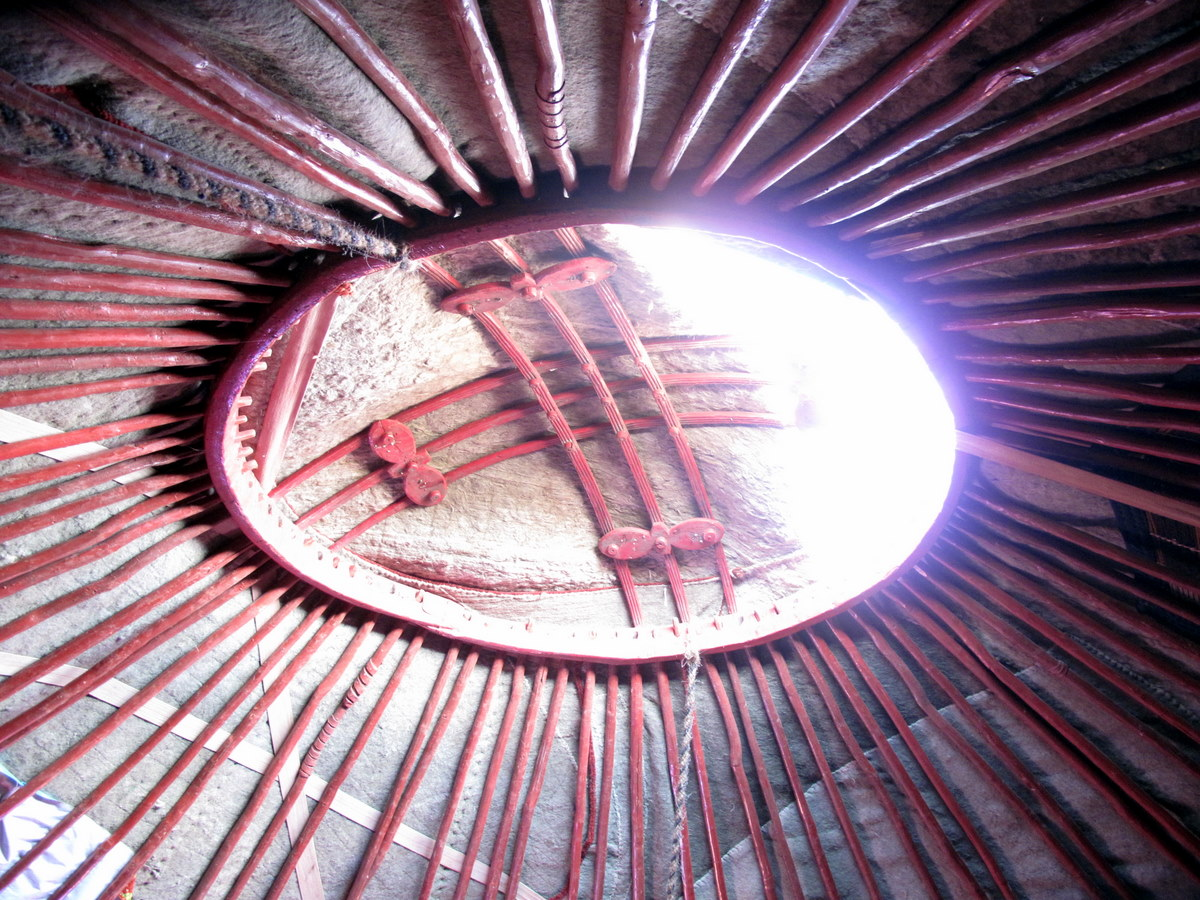
Roof crown of a Kyrgyz yurt used in the flag of Kyrgyzstan

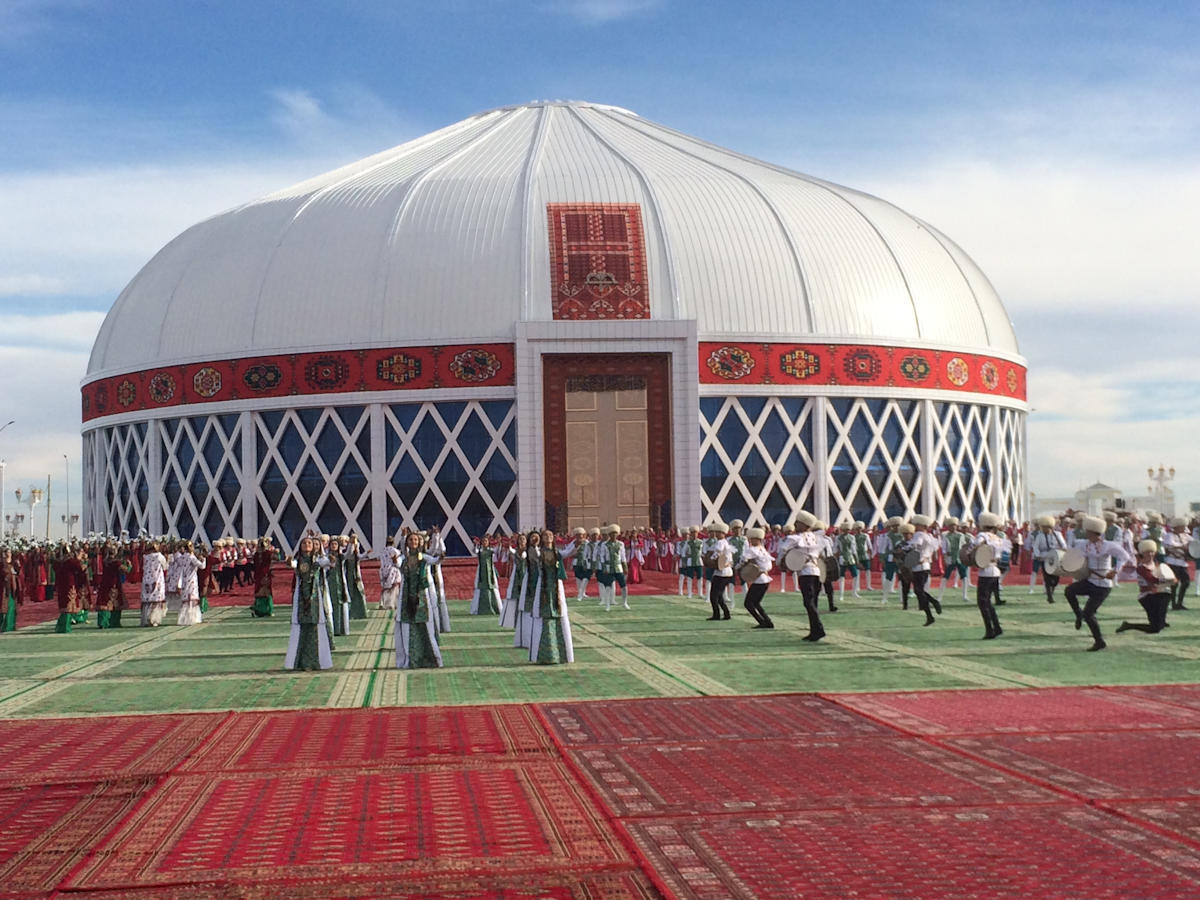
Ak Öýi (White Building), yurt-shaped concrete building, "The World's Largest Yurt", near Mary, Turkmenistan, established 2015

Emblem of Kazakhstan

Flag of Kyrgyzstan

The shangyrak or wooden crown of the yurt (Mongolian: тооно, [tɔːn]; Kazakh: шаңырақ, romanized: Shañıraq [ɕɑɴəɾɑ́q]; Kyrgyz: түндүк [tyndýk]; Turkmen: tüýnük) is itself emblematic in many Central Asian cultures. In old Kazakh communities, the yurt itself would often be repaired and rebuilt, but the shangyrak would remain intact, passed from father to son upon the father's death. A family's length of heritage could be measured by the accumulation of stains on the shangyrak from decades of smoke passing through it. A stylized version of the crown is in the center of the coat of arms of Kazakhstan, and forms the main image on the flag of Kyrgyzstan.

Today a yurt is seen as a national symbol among many Central Asian groups, and as such, yurts may be used as cafés (especially those specializing in traditional food), museums (especially those relating to national culture), and souvenir shops. In celebration of the city of Mary's year as Cultural Capital of the Turkic World, the government of Turkmenistan constructed a yurt-shaped structure, called Ak Öýi (White Building) and described as "The World's Largest Yurt", of concrete, granite, aluminum, and glass. Established on November 27, 2015, the structure is 35 meters high and 70 meters in diameter. According to the Turkmenistan state news agency, "a white yurt is a symbol of an age-old, distinctive historical-cultural legacy, a sign of preservation of our roots and origins". This three-story structure includes a café, offices, and VIP apartments, as well as a large auditorium with 3,000 seats. A total of five yurt buildings have been constructed across Turkmenistan, one in each region: Mary Region, Ahal Region, Lebap Region, Balkan Region, and Daşoguz Region.

Bishkek Arena while hosting the 6th World Nomad Games

In August 2026, Bishkek opened the Bishkek Arena, a yurt-shaped multi-purpose stadium with a seating capacity of 51,000. The arena hosted the opening ceremony of the 6th World Nomad Games.

=== Buddhism in Mongolia ===
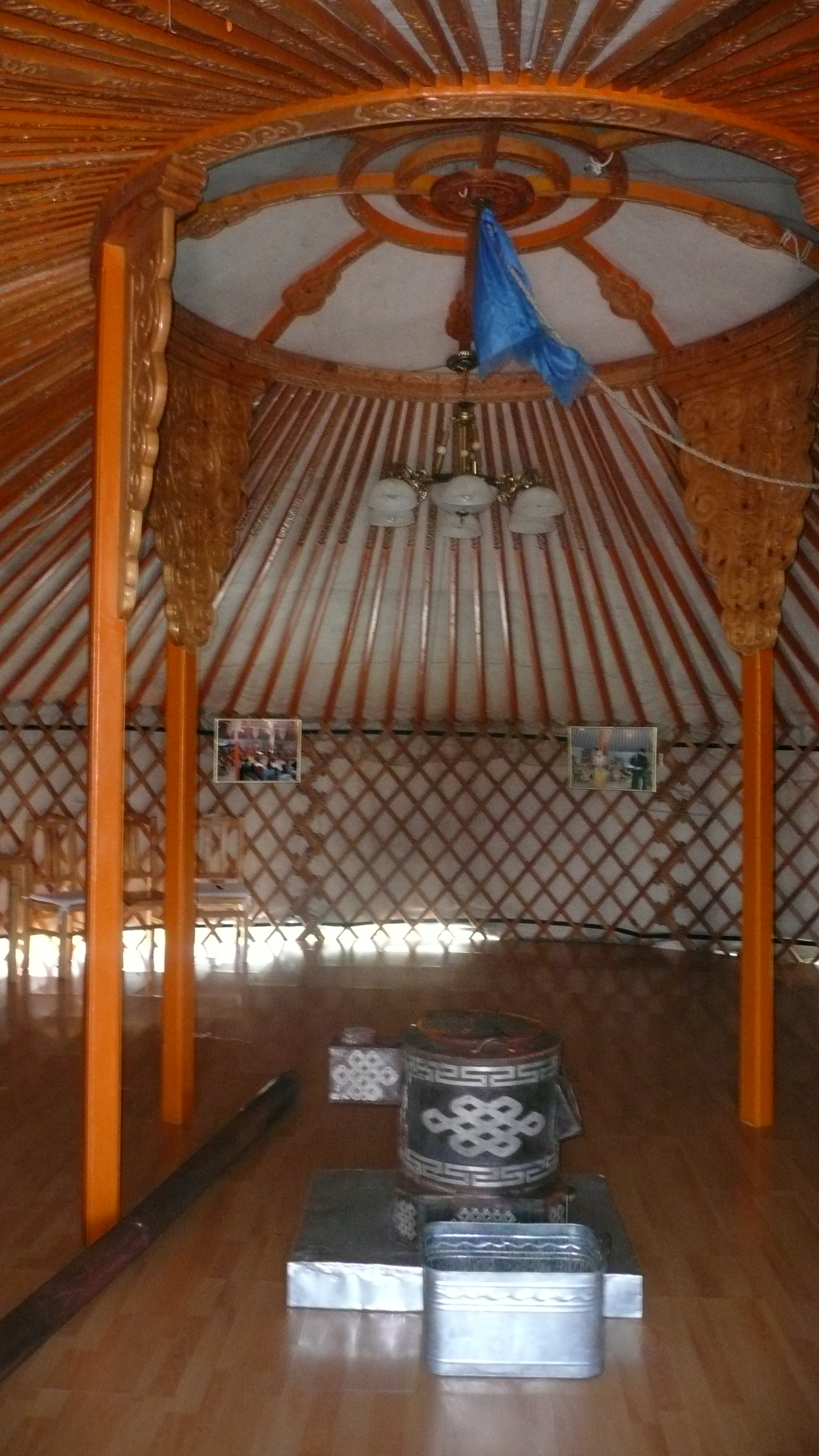
Buddhist symbols: dharmachakra, represented by the khorlo (Tib: འཀོར་ལོ།) toono; khadag (Tib: ཁ་བཏགས་) hangs from the toono and dpal be'u (Tib: དཔལ་གྱི་བེའུ) is present on the stove.

The design of the Mongolian ger developed from its ancient simple forms to actively integrate with Buddhist culture. The crown—toono adopted the shape of Dharmachakra. The earlier style of toono, nowadays more readily found in Central Asian yurts, is called in Mongolia "sarkhinag toono," while the toono representing Buddhist dharmachakra is called "khorlo" (Tibetan འཀོར་ལོ།) toono. Also the shapes, colors, and ornaments of the wooden elements—toono, pillars, and poles of the Mongolian yurt—are in accord with the artistic style found in Buddhist monasteries in Mongolia. Such yurts are called "uyangiin ger", literally meaning "home of lyrics" or "home of melodies".

== Westernization ==
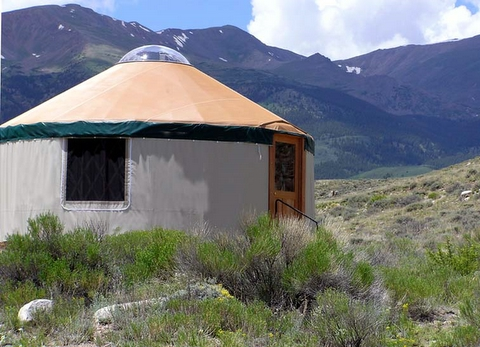
A yurt-derived structure in the Colorado mountains, USA

Enthusiasts in other countries have adapted the visual idea of the yurt, a round, semi-permanent tent. Although those structures may be copied to some extent from the originals found in Central Asia, they often have some different features and structures in their design to adapt them to different climate and uses.

In Canada and the United States, yurts are often made using high-tech materials. They can be highly engineered and built for extreme weather conditions. In addition, erecting one can take days and it may not be intended to be frequently moved. Such North American yurts are better thought of as yurt derivations, as they are no longer round felt homes that are easy to mount, dismount, and transport. North American yurts and yurt derivations were pioneered by William Coperthwaite in the 1960s, after he was inspired to build them by a National Geographic article about Supreme Court Justice William O. Douglas's visit to Mongolia.

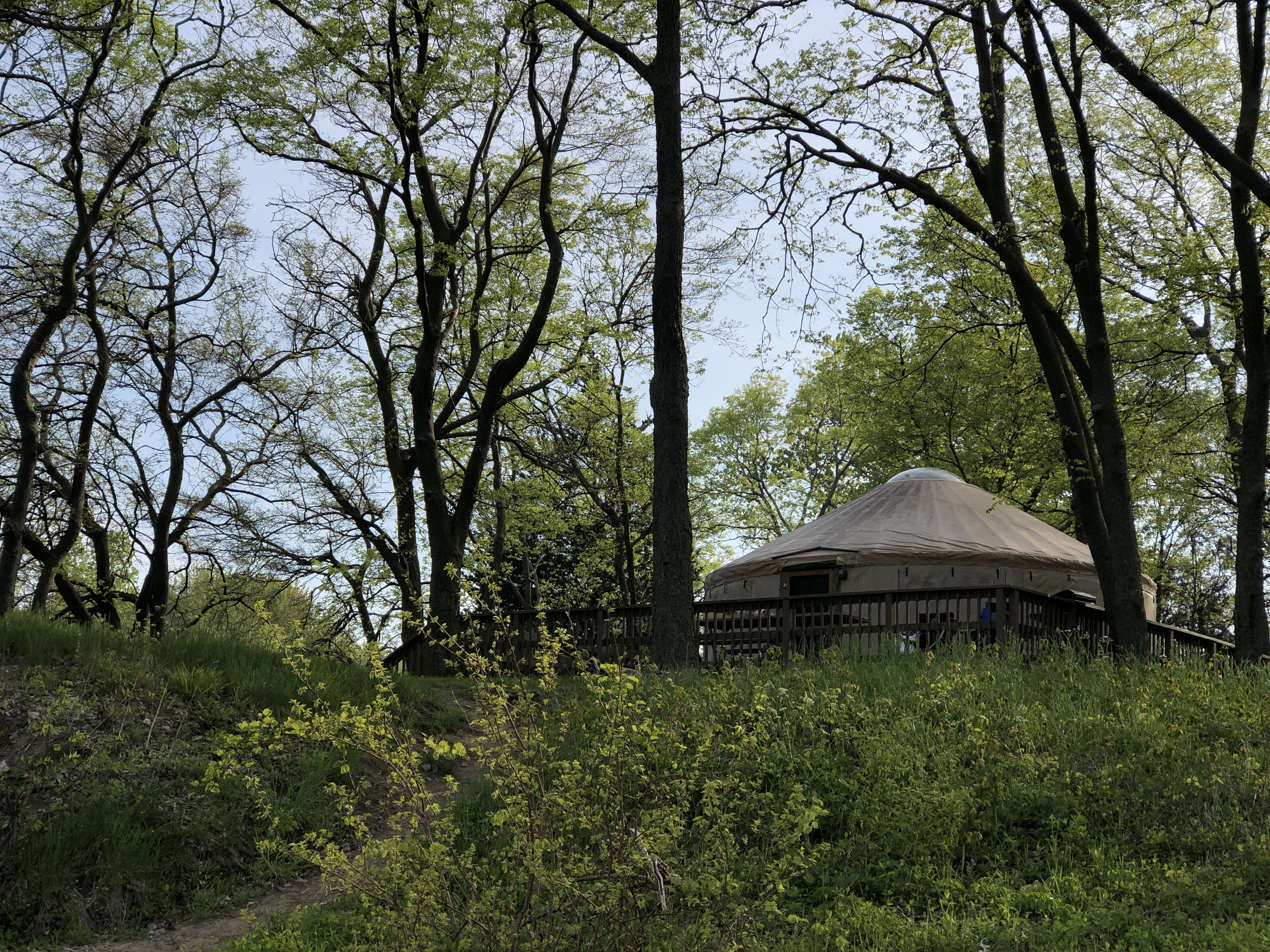
An American yurt with a deck. Permanently located in Kelleys Island State Park

In 1978, American company Pacific Yurts became the first to manufacture yurts using architectural fabrics and structural engineering, paving the way for yurts to become popular attractions at ski resorts and campgrounds. Yurts are also popular in Northern Canada. In 1994, Oregon became the first state to incorporate yurts into its Parks Department as year-round camping facilities. Since then, at least 17 other US States have introduced yurt camping into their own parks departments.

In Europe, a closer approximation to the Turkic and Mongolian yurt is in production in several countries. These tents use local hardwood, and often are made for a wetter climate with steeper roof profiles and waterproof canvas. In essence they are yurts, but some lack the felt cover and ornate features across the exterior that is present in traditional yurt. There are UK-made yurts that feature a metal frame in use in at least two glamping sites in Somerset and Dorset.

The palloza is a traditional building found in the Serra dos Ancares in Galicia (NW Spain). Pallozas have stone walls and a conical roof made of stalks of rye.

Different groups and individuals use yurts for a variety of purposes, from full-time housing to school rooms. In some provincial parks in Canada, and state parks in several US states, permanent yurts are available for camping.

Since the late 1920s the German youth and Scouting movements have adapted a variant of the yurt and the Sami Lavvu (Kohte), calling them Schwarzzelt (black tent), a term mainly used for tents from North Africa.

== See also ==
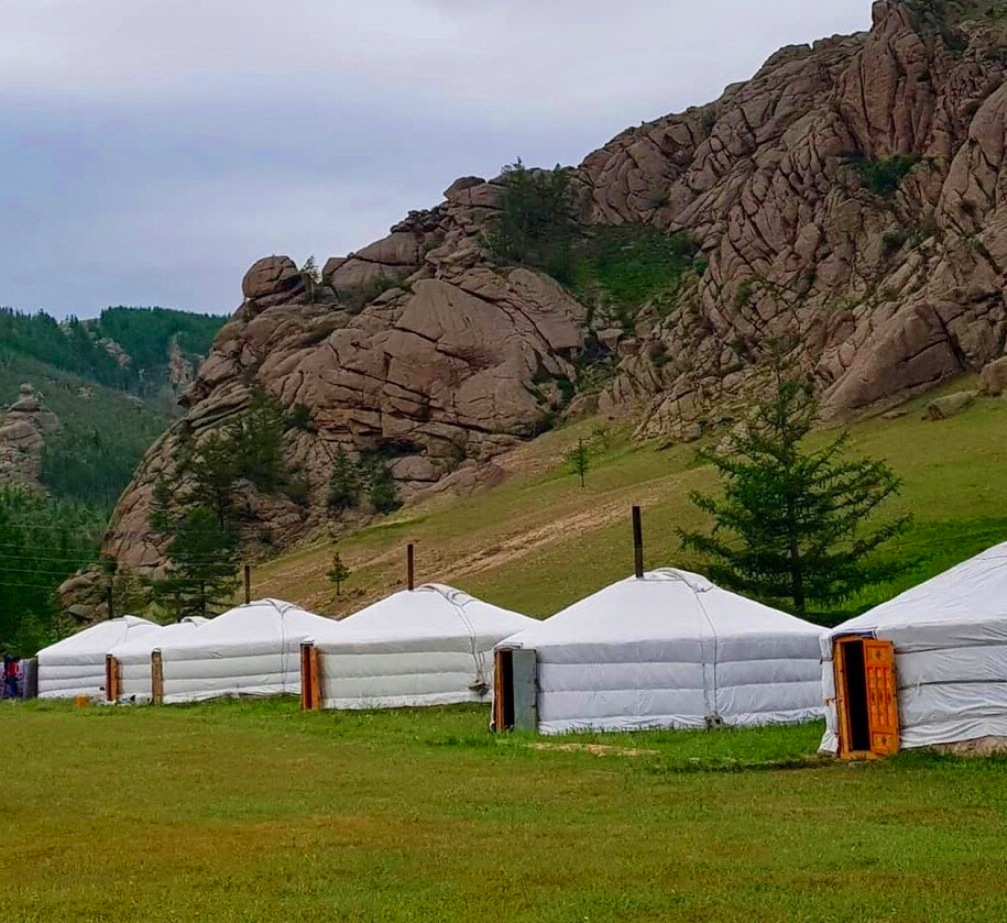
Yurts in the tourist camp, Mongolia

- Chum
- Igloo
- Lavvu
- List of building types
- List of house types
- List of human habitation forms
- Tipi
- Vernacular architecture
- Early and simple domes
