= Cervantes, Lugo =

Municipality in Galicia, Spain

Coordinates: 42.867°N 7.067°W

Cervantes
- Municipality
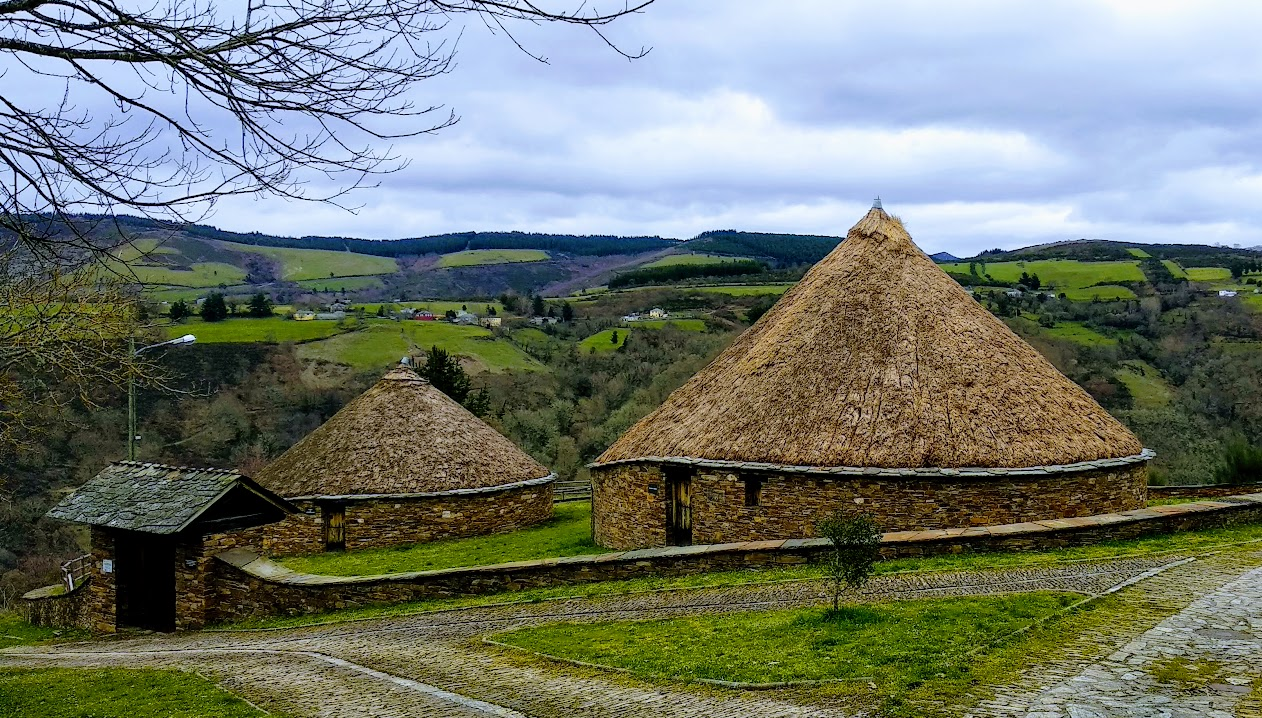
- Town hall.

- Coat of arms

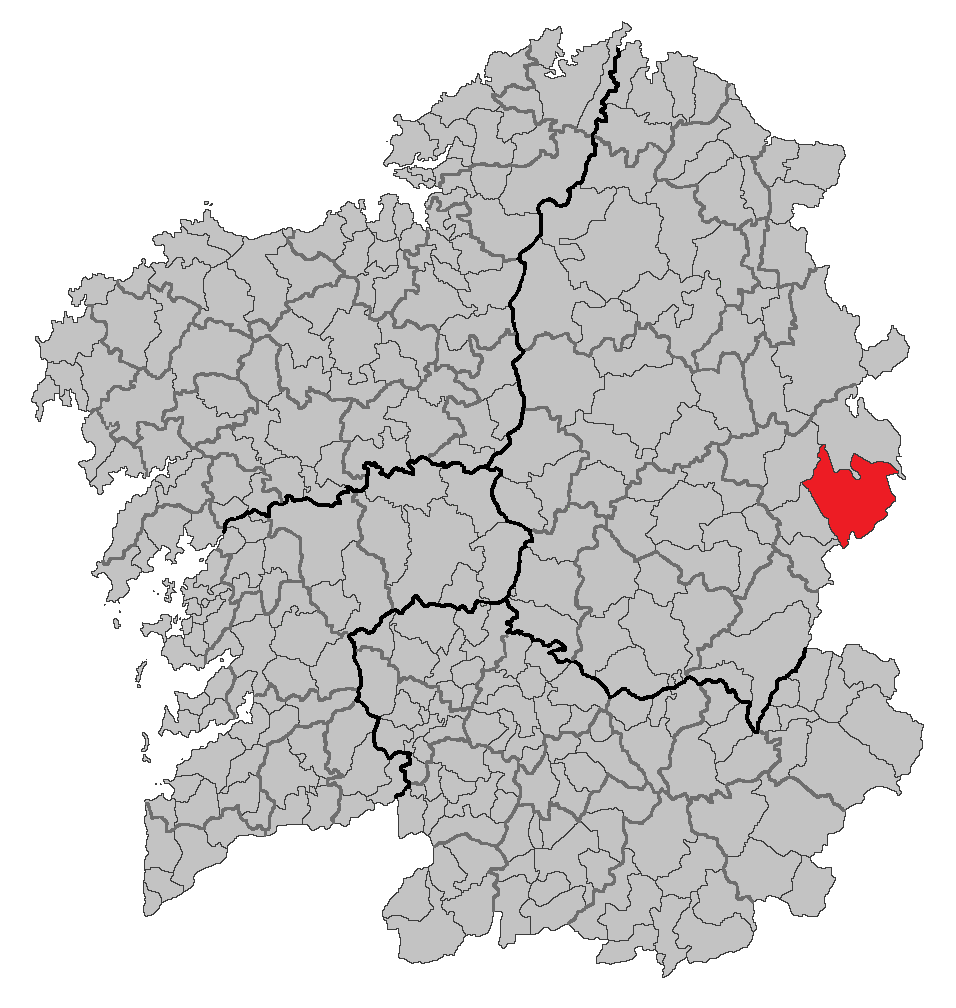
- Location of Cervantes

- Location in Spain
- Country: Spain
- Autonomous community: Galicia
- Province: Lugo
- Comarca: Os Ancares

Government
  - Alcalde: Benigno Gómez Tadín (PSdeG–PSOE)

Area
  - Total: 277.63 km^{2} (107.19 sq mi)

Population (2023)
  - Total: 1,209
  - Density: 4.355/km^{2} (11.28/sq mi)
- Demonym(s): cervantego, -a
- Time zone: UTC+1 (CET)
  - Summer (DST): UTC+2 (CEST)
- Postal code: 27664
- Website: Official website

Cervantes is a municipality in the province of Lugo, in the autonomous community of Galicia, Spain. It belongs to the comarca of Os Ancares.

It had a population of 1,209 in 2023, and has an area of 277.63 square kilometres. Its highest point is Mustellar (1924 m), in the Ancares mountains.

Until the second half of the 20th century, this part of Spain was isolated. Many settlements had no road access or electricity and were cut off by snow in winter. Communities were small and self-sufficient. This way of life is shown in the small museum at Piornedo which is located in a preserved palloza.

The main economic activities in 2006 were agriculture, forestry and tourism.

== Geography ==
Cervantes is located in the natural mountainous setting of Ancares in Lugo. In the vicinity are located the following peaks:

- Mustallar (1,924 m)
- Miravalles (1,969 m)
- Tres Bispos (1,793 m)
- Pena Rubia (1,826 m)
- Pena Larga, Lagosd
- Charcos (passes 1,800 metros)
- Formigueiros (1,643 m)
- Piapaxaro (1,616 m)
- Tesón (1,374 m)
- Pena (1,118 m)
- Lago (1,085 m)
- Pena Ouviaña (893 m)
- Pico Murado (1,111 m)
- Pico Cuiña (1,998m)

These elevations are located in the nearby mountain ranges of A Trappe, Lóuzara, O Oribio, O Rañadoiro and O Piornal .

The municipalities of the eastern mountains of Lugo make up the Galician region of Navia. The municipalities of Negueira de Muñiz, Navia, Cervantes and As Nogais are fully Naviano municipalities.

=== Flora and vegetation ===
The lands in Cervantes in the eastern mountains are home to a rich flora. Of the total species that exist in Galician, which is around 2,200 species and subspecies, only in the nearby highlands of O Courel can 800 taxa, nearly 40% of the total, in an area that represents 1% of the Galician surface, be found. The catalog of Os Ancares, that includes two slopes, consists of 1,028 vascular plant species and subspecies. There are 33 fern species that are located in these mountains as class 7 of pteridology wealth, out of a maximum of 8. This is one of the areas of greatest diversity of ferns in Spain.

The relatively good state of conservation of the area means that there remains a forested area with a good presence of trees: oak, Mountain Oak, Turkey oak, beech, yew, elm mountain, hazel, holly, maple, birch, chestnut, cherry, rowan, ash, alder, willows and poplars.

In Galicia only the high peaks of Os Trevinca and Ancares and are above the forest limit, each with its corresponding shrub.

=== Fauna ===
Of the 75 species of reptiles and amphibians living in the peninsula of Spain and on the islands, 27 are present in Os Ancares. They are triturus (3 species), frog (6 species), lizards (Lacerta), vipers and snakes (6 species). Among birds, passerines are important for good representation, followed by accipitrines, among which are the short-toed eagle, the goshawk, abundant hawks, buzzards and the hen harrier. There is no shortage of red and gray partridge or grouse.

== History ==
Cervantes scholars consider the theory of Miguel de Cervantes's originating from here as false; Cervantes did not even use the 2nd surname Saavedra (not his birth name) until he was in his 20s.

At the beginning of Chapter XXXIX of the Part 1 of Don Quixote, a secondary character, the captive companion of Zoraida, says she is from "Somewhere in the mountains of León". "[That] was my first lineage, with whom the nature of fortune was most grateful and liberal: though, amidst the penury of those parts, my father passed for a rich man..."
