= Piornedo =

Coordinates: 42.8567°N 6.8758°W

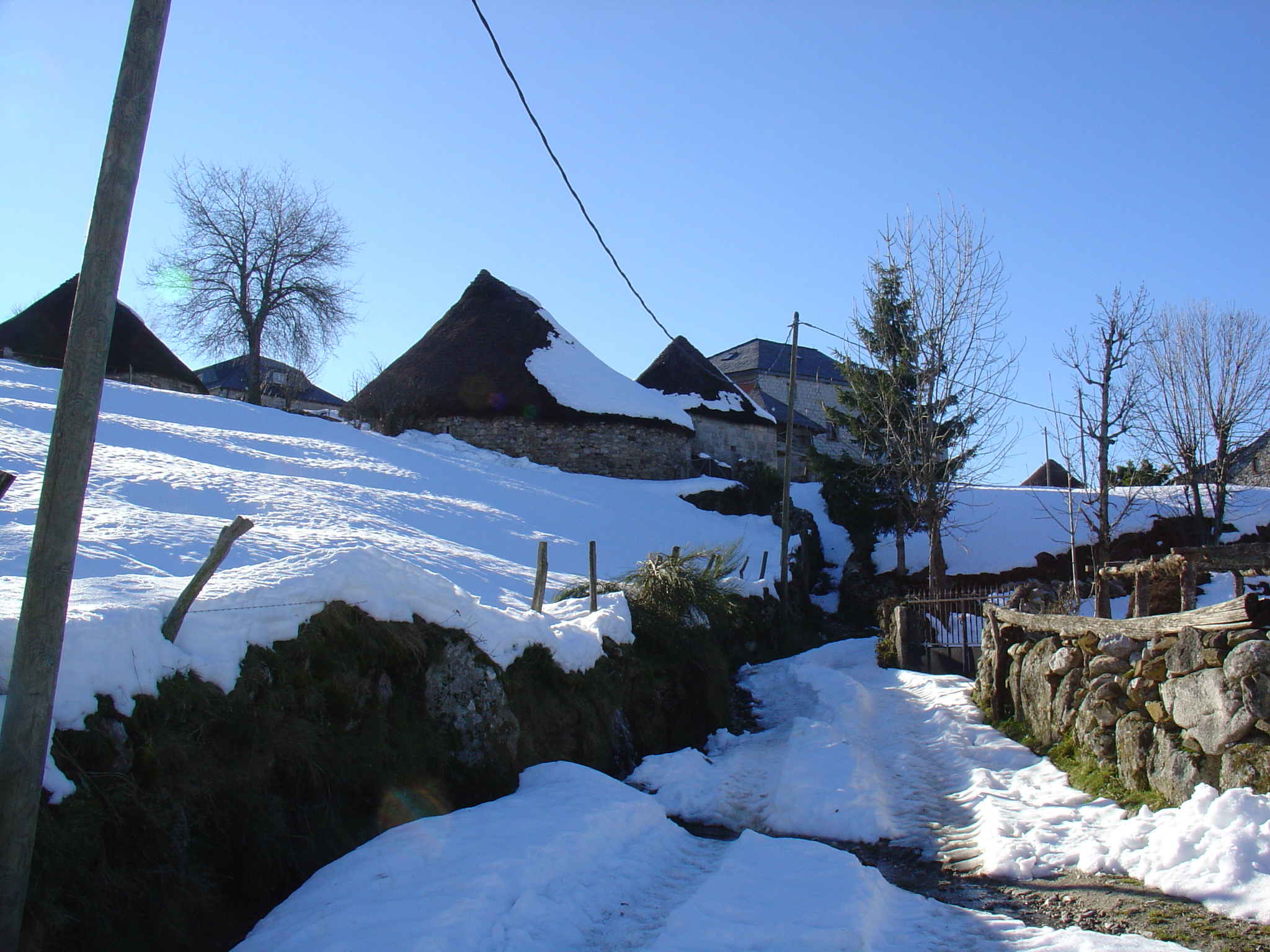
Piornedo on a snowy day. A cluster of pallozas can be seen on the left.

Piornedo is a small village in the Ancares mountains in Spain located at a height of approximately 1,300 metres. The village is part of the parish of Donis (official name San Fiz de Donis), which is located in the municipality of Cervantes, in the comarca of Os Ancares, in the province of Lugo, Galicia.

Piornedo is famous for its pallozas, traditional roundhouses with thatched roofs, typical of the Serra dos Ancares. One of them has been converted into a museum, that shows how people lived in this remote region until comparatively recently. The village is now a centre for tourism, especially for walkers, and has a small hotel, guest houses, restaurants and a bar.
