= Teito =

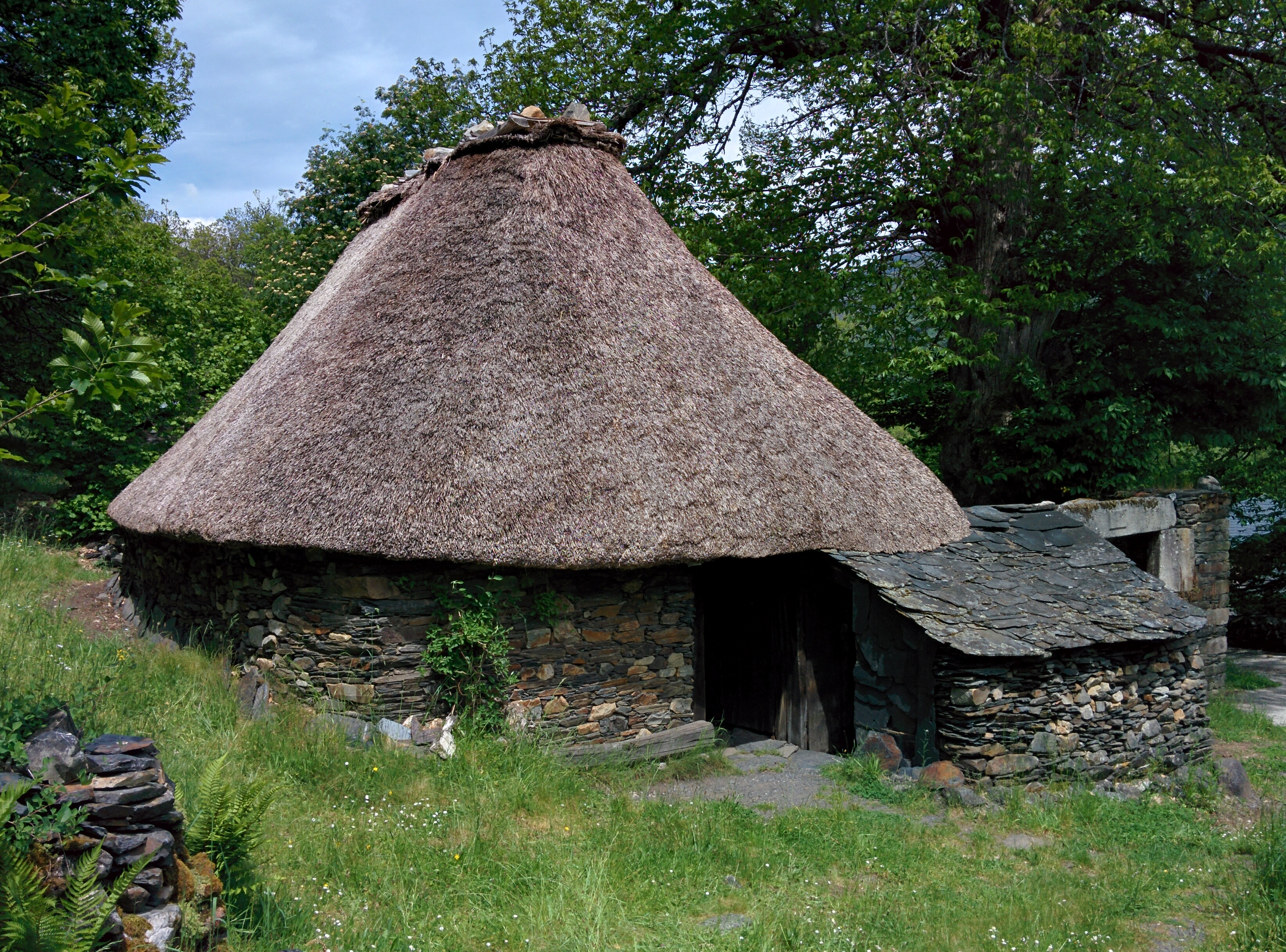
Teito in Pereda de Ancares, Spain

Teito (also Palhoça in Portugal and Palloza in Galicia) is an Asturian term that designates a type of stone dwelling with a thatched straw or broom roof, found in western Asturias, especially in the Somiedo and Oscos area, and also in Galicia, North West of León, and North East of Portugal.

Although the word teito means literally "roof", by extension it is used to call the building itself. In Asturias and León the preferred word is "teito", while in Galicia and in the Leonese shire of Ancares the word "palloza" is used.
