= Campo del Agua =

- Minor local entity
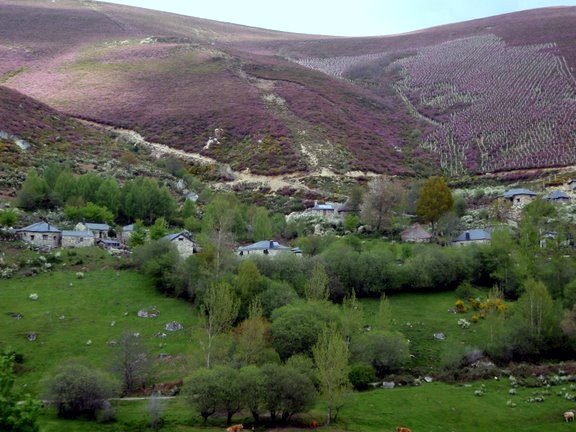

- Location within Province of León Location within Castile and León Location within Spain
- Coordinates: 42°46′30″N 6°49′32″W
- Country: Spain
- Autonomous community: Castile and León
- Province: Province of León
- Municipality: Villafranca del Bierzo
- Elevation: 1,271 m (4,170 ft)

Population
  - Total: 30

Campo del Agua is a locality and minor local entity located in the municipality of Villafranca del Bierzo, in León province, Castile and León, Spain. As of 2020, it has a population of 30.

The village was home to one of the largest clusters of pallozas (traditional thatched dwellings) in the north-west of the Iberian Peninsula, until they were destroyed by a fire in the summer of 1989.

== Geography ==
Campo del Agua is located 163km west of León, Spain.
