= Serra dos Ancares =

Mountain range in Spain

- Sierra de los Ancares
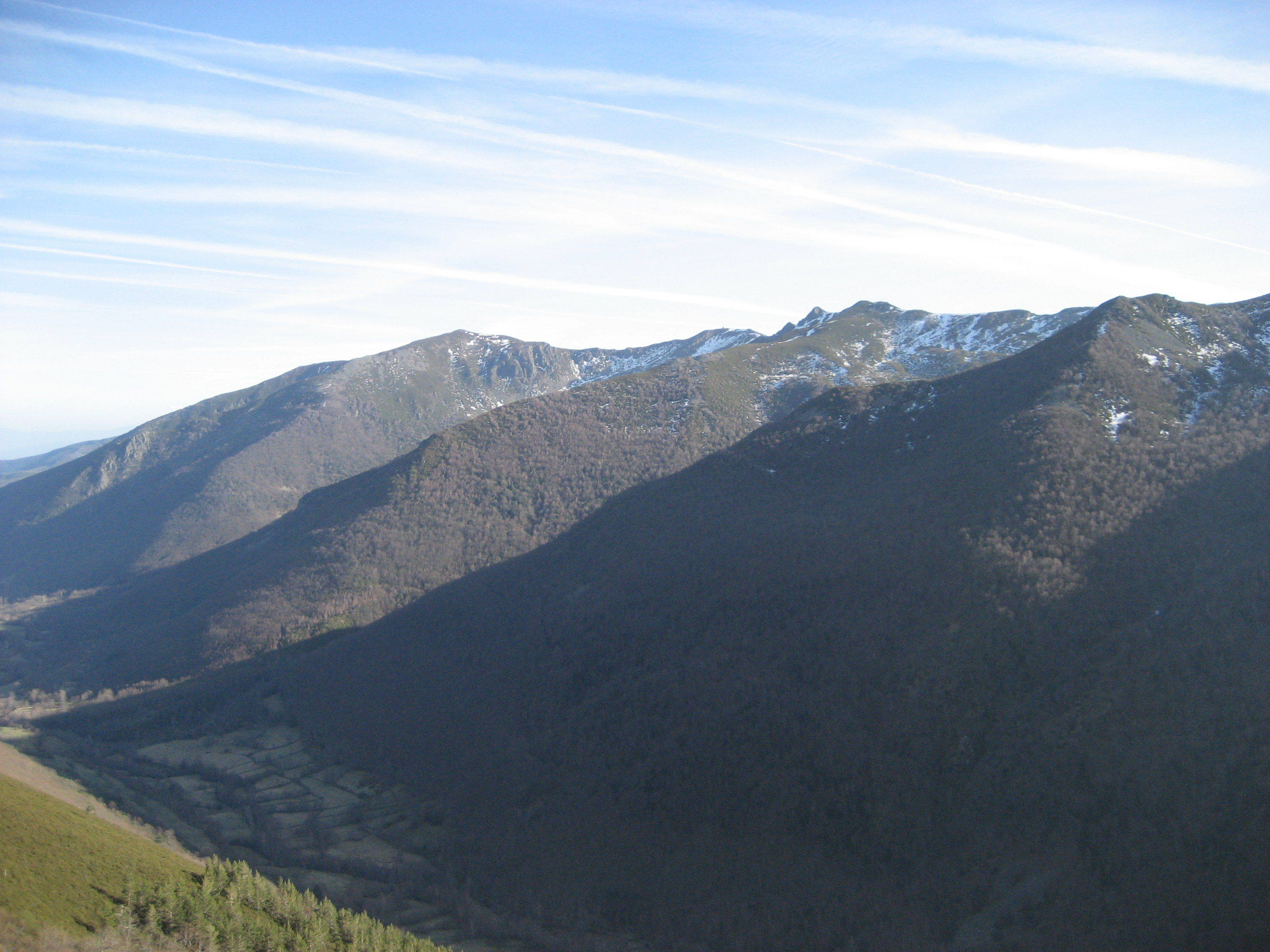
- General view of the range

Highest point
- Peak: Cuiña
- Elevation: 1,987 m (6,519 ft)
- Coordinates: 42°46′05″N 6°53′53″W

Dimensions
- Length: 95 km (59 mi) NE/SW
- Width: 32 km (20 mi) NW/SE

Geography
- Location within Spain
- Location: Lugo Province, Galicia; León Province, Castile and León
- Country: Spain
- Parent range: Galician Massif

Geology
- Orogeny: Variscan orogeny
- Rock age: Ordovician
- Rock type(s): Slate, limestone, sandstone, quartzite

The Serra dos Ancares (Spanish: Sierra de los Ancares, also known as Sierra de Ancares) is a mountain range of the Galician Massif in north-west Spain, extending in a south-westerly direction from the western end of the Cantabrian Mountains in Asturias.

== Geography ==
The range forms the boundary between the autonomous communities of Galicia and Castile and León. The highest point of the range is the Cuiña Peak at 1,987 metres (6,519 ft). Other notable peaks are Mustallar (1,935 m) and Miravalles (1,969 m). The smaller Serra do Courel lies south of this range, stretching parallel to it.

The main trees in the range are willow and European alder close to water courses, as well as chestnut, ash, common hazel, oak and common holly. Above 1,600 metres (5,200 ft) there is brushland with tree heath and juniper.

This area of Spain contains many isolated rural communities that were largely cut off from the outside world until roads were built in the mid 20th century. The most significant element of the whole architecture of the area is the palloza or casa teito, stone buildings of ancient origin, with a circular or elliptical plan.

== Ecology ==
Sierra de los Ancares is the name of a Site of Community Importance in the province of León.

Os Ancares Lucenses y Montes de Cervantes, Navia y Becerrea was declared a UNESCO Biosphere Reserve in 2006. Los Ancares Leoneses is also a biosphere reserve.

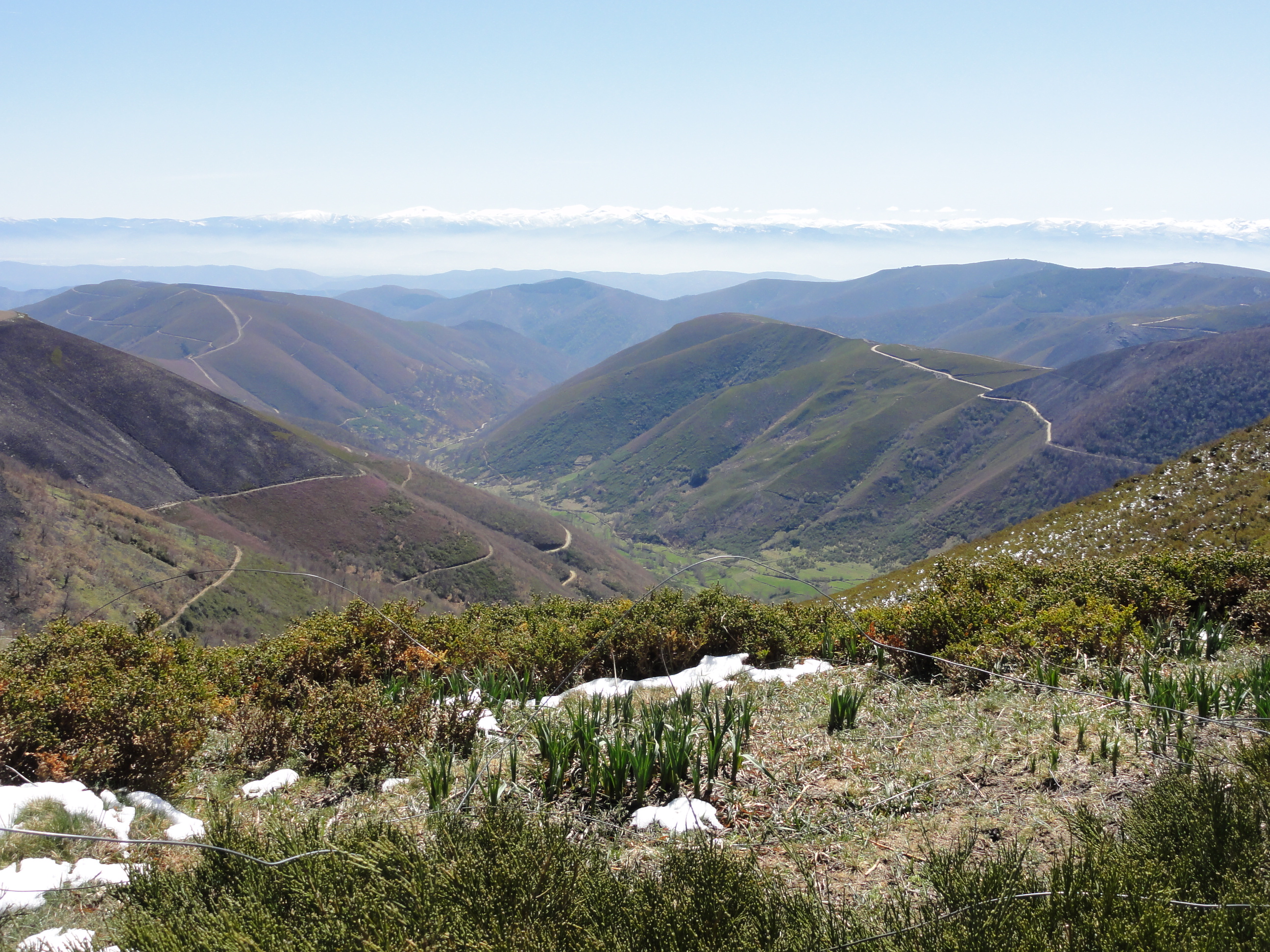
View from Pena Rubia

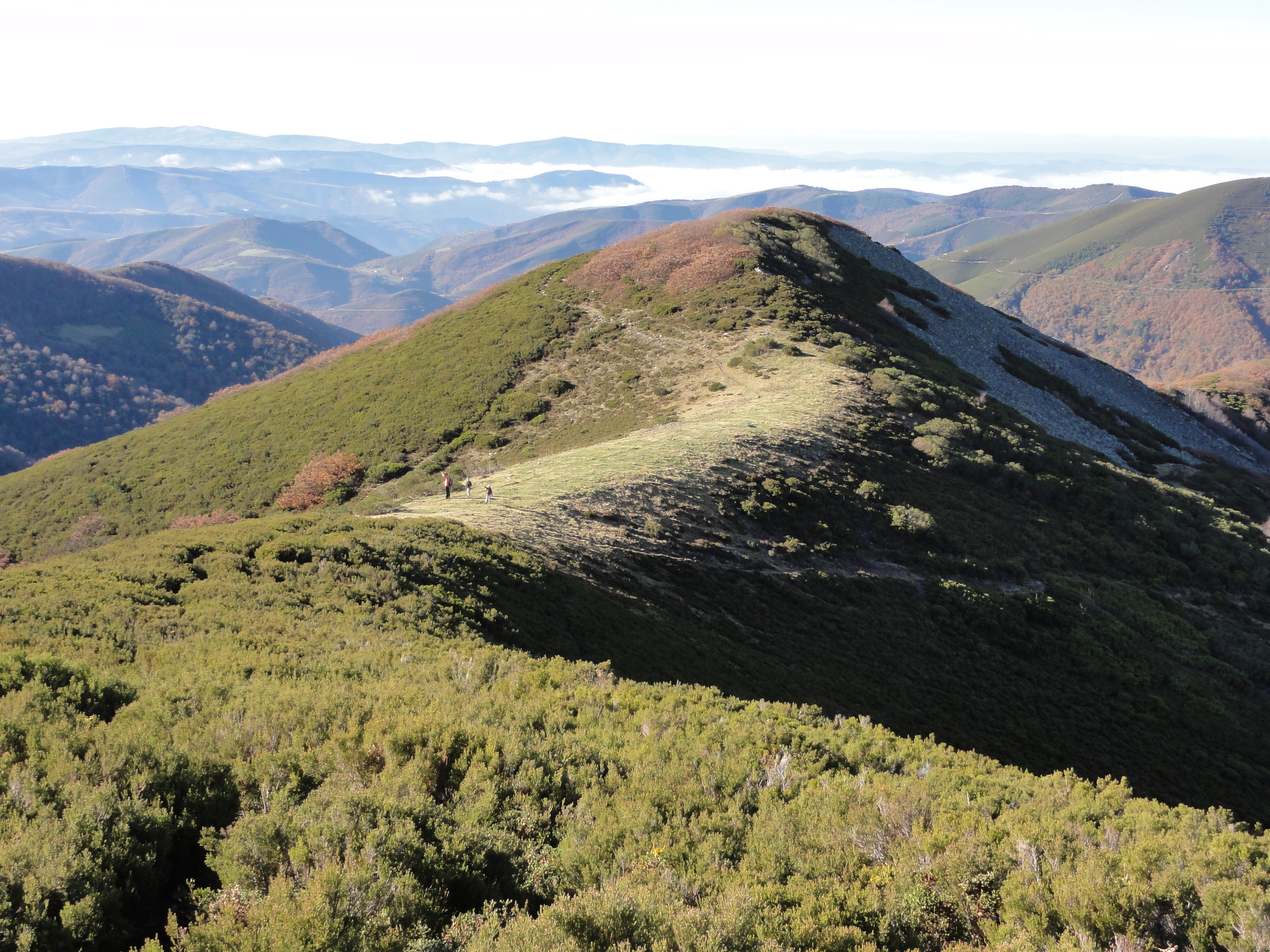
Trail to Tres Bispos

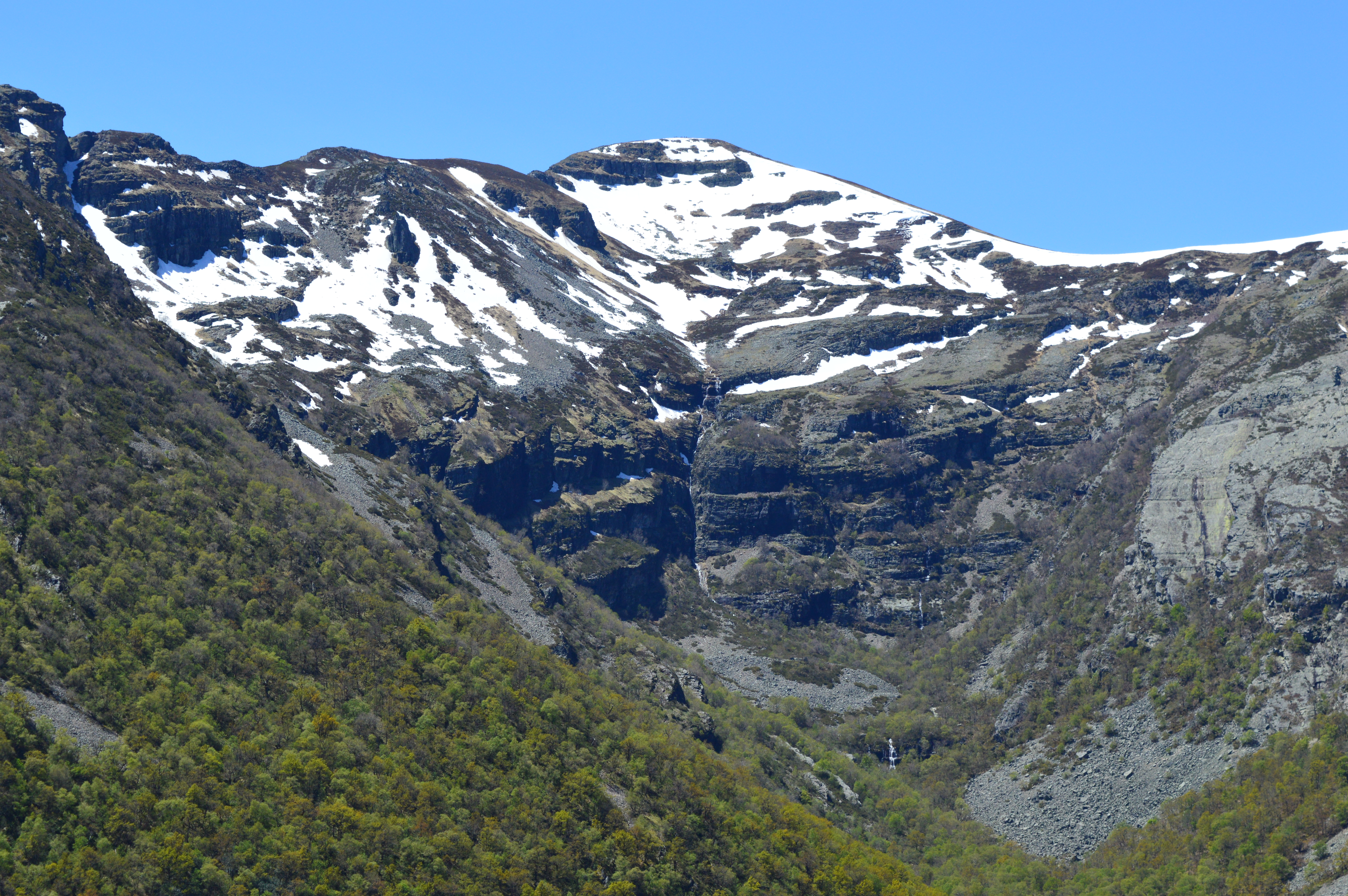
Pico Cuiña (1,998 m), highest point of Os Ancares

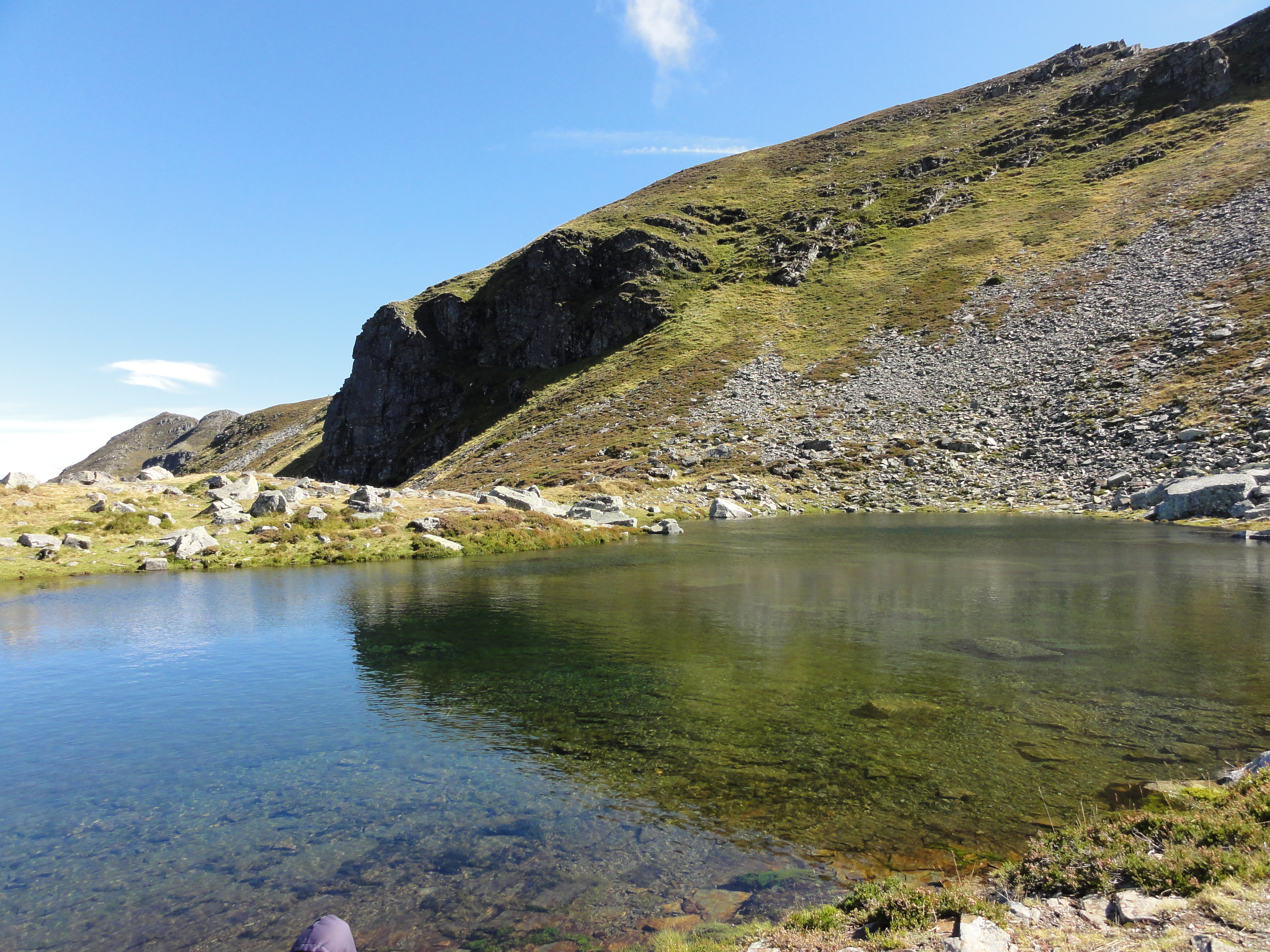
Pozo Ferreira lake, near Pico Cuiña

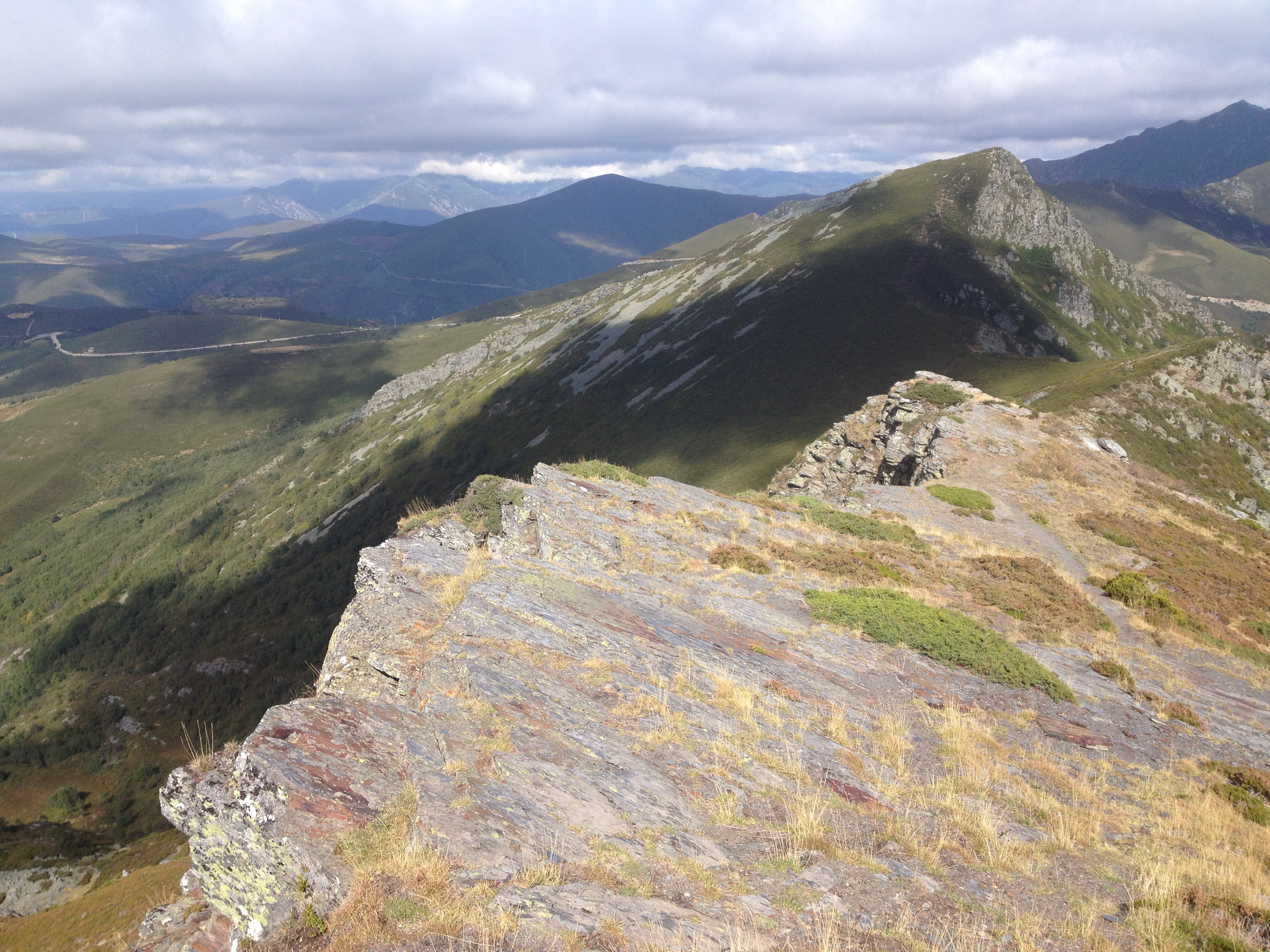
View near Pico Miravalles

== See also ==
- Los Ancares
- Os Ancares
