= Palloza =

Traditional Spanish dwelling type

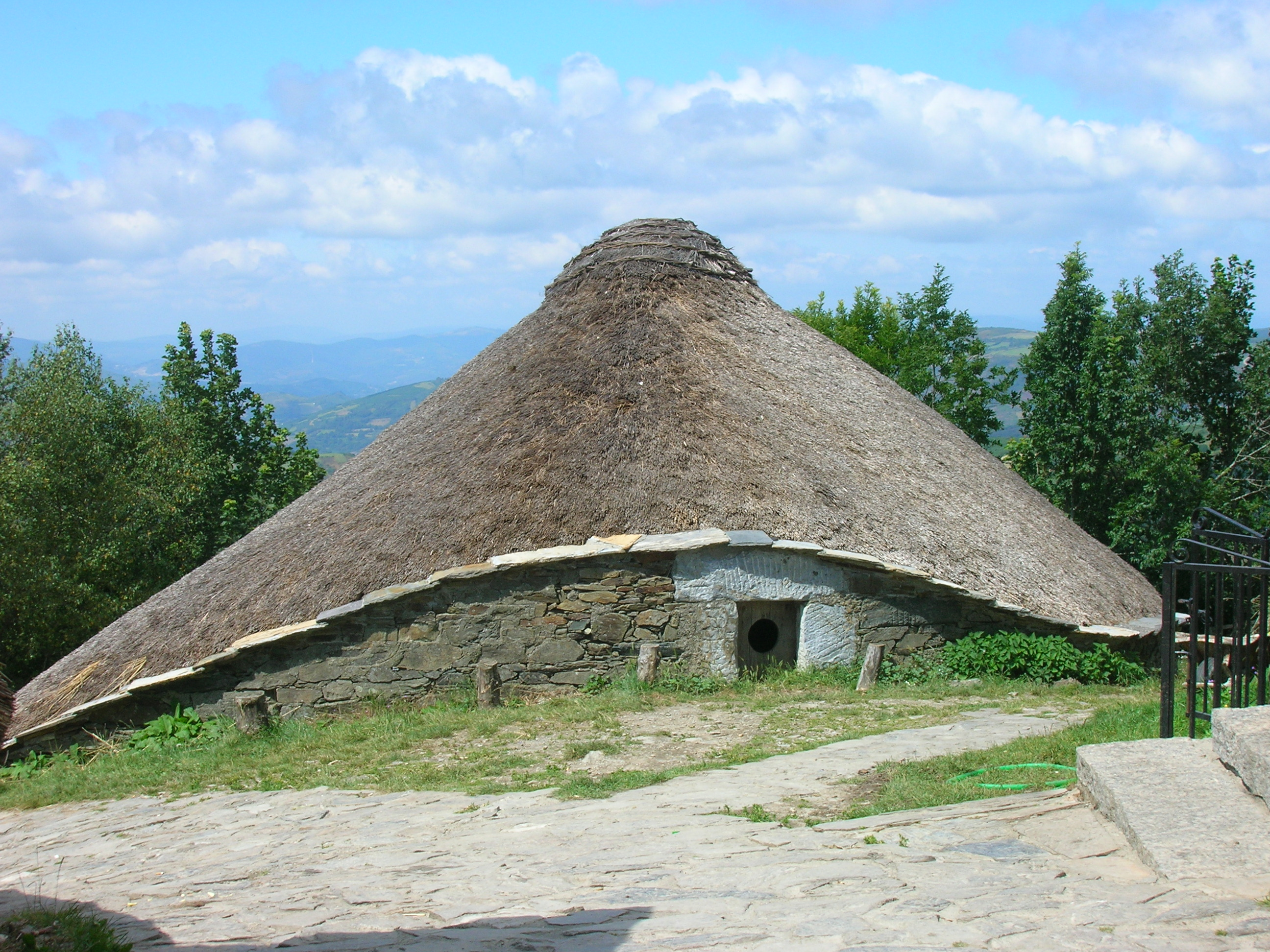
Palloza in O Cebreiro, in the municipality of Pedrafita do Cebreiro. The ethnographic park of this town, the first step in Galician land of the French Way, has several restored examples of traditional palloza, buildings characteristic of the pre-Roman culture which still exists in many other parts of the natural region of Os Ancares

A palloza (also known as pallouza, pallaza or traditionally casa de teito) is a traditional dwelling of the Serra dos Ancares of northwest Spain.

== Structure ==
A palloza is a traditional thatched house as found in the Leonese county of El Bierzo, Serra dos Ancares in Galicia, and south-west of Asturias; corresponding to Astur tribes area, one of pre Hispano-Celtic inhabitants of northwest Hispania. It is circular or oval, and about ten or twenty metres in diameter and is built to withstand severe winter weather at a typical altitude of 1,200 metres.

The main structure is stone, and is divided internally into separate areas for the family and their animals, with separate entrances. The roof is conical, made from rye straw on a wooden frame. There is no chimney, the smoke from the kitchen fire seeps out through the thatch.

As well as living space for humans and animals, a palloza has its own bread oven, workshops for wood, metal and leather work, and a loom. Only the eldest couple of an extended family had their own bedroom, which they shared with the youngest children. The rest of the family slept in the hay loft, in the roof space.

== Origin ==
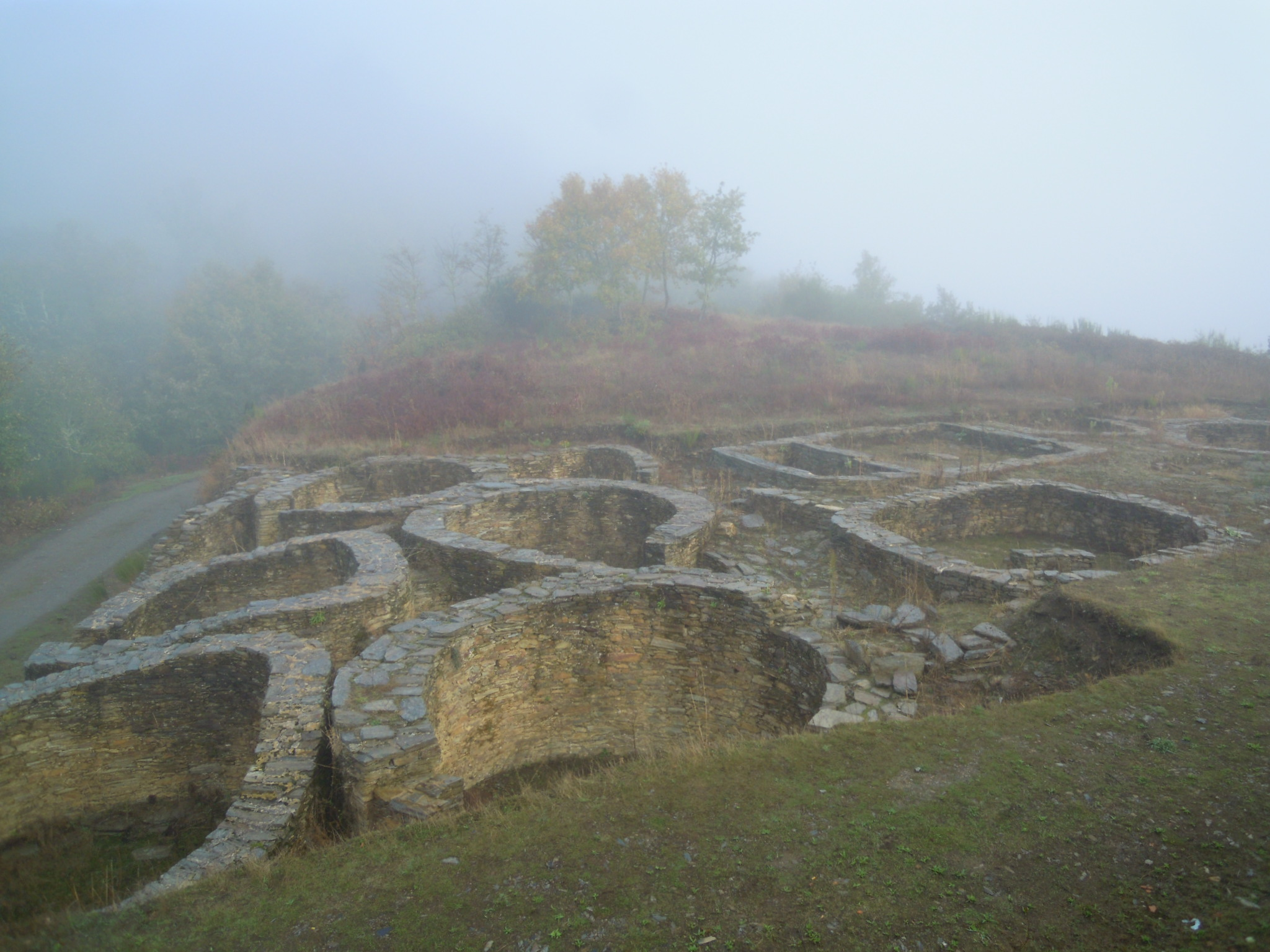
Ruins of the hillfort (castro) of Santa María de Cervantes, in the Province of Lugo. Historians regard pallozas as an evolution of the dwellings of the Castro culture.

The typology of round dwellings with thatched roofs dates back to prehistoric times and bears a strong resemblance to the circular structures of the Castro culture in the northwest of the Iberian Peninsula and other Iron Age cultures in Atlantic Europe. However, while houses in castros were inhabited only by humans, in pallozas people lived alongside their belongings and animals in the same space, which was considerably larger than those in castros.

Its name is actually a corruption of the Galician word "pallaza", first used in the late 19th century by ethnographers such as German Fritz Krüger, who was referring to the material used to make the roof. The traditional name of these buildings is in fact casa de teito or casa de teitu.

The term palloza (spelled palhoça) is also used in the Portuguese language, where it describes a type of small cabin built with wood and thatched roof.

== Preservation and current uses ==
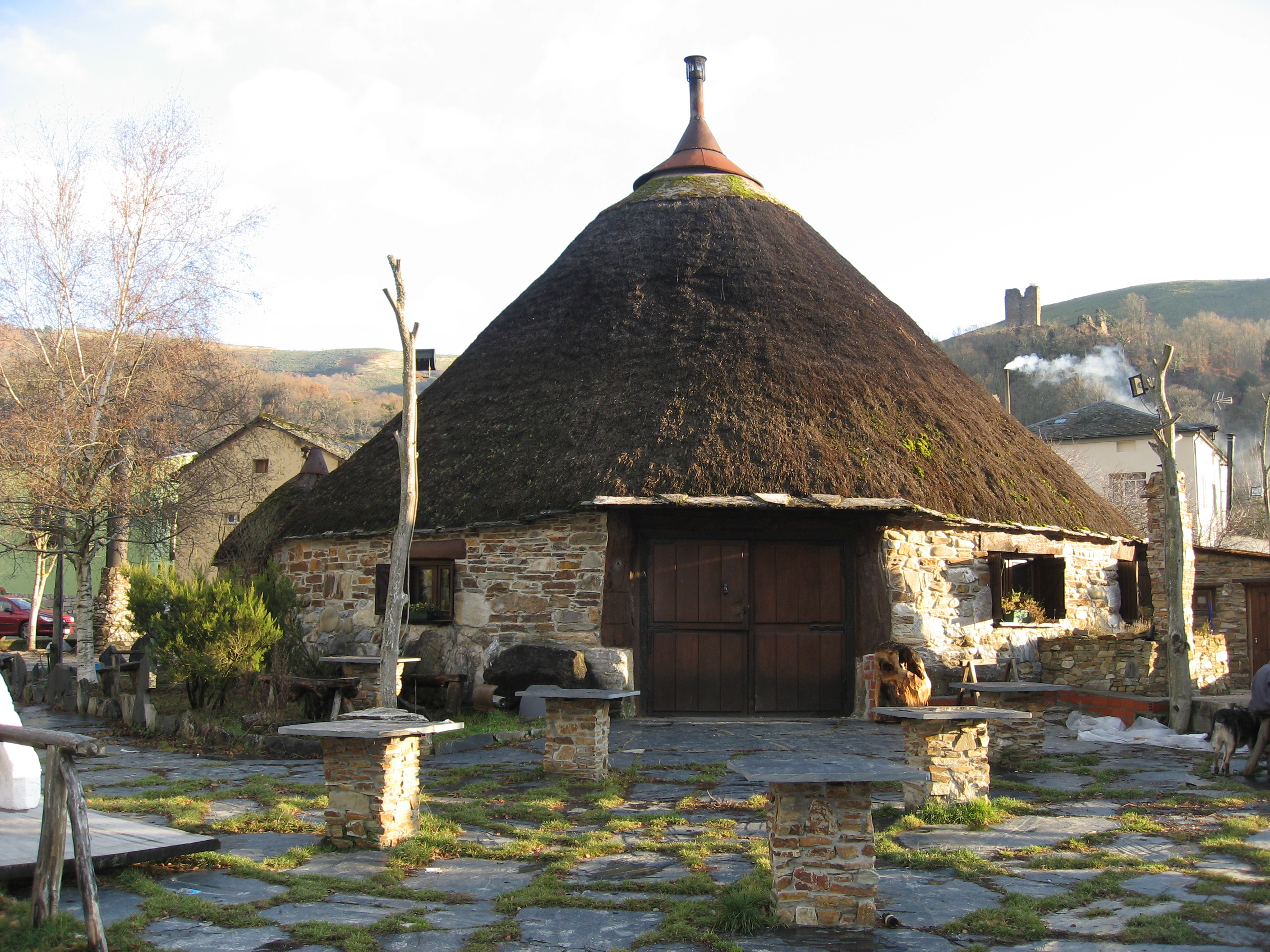
Municipal palloza in Balboa (León), used as bar and restaurant.

Pallozas were used until the second half of the 20th century, when improvements in communications brought modern materials and architectural concepts to the area. At the time, pallozas were perceived by their inhabitants as symbols of backwardness and poverty, which contributed to their gradual abandonment.

However, towards the end of the 20th century, these dwellings began to be recognised for their ethnographic value. Pallozas can still be found in the Ancares region of Galicia, western Asturias and northwest León. The remarkable pallozas in the Bierzan town of Campo del Agua were largely destroyed by a fire in the summer of 1989. One of the best-preserved groups of pallozas can be found in Piornedo, a village in Galicia which has been an open-air ethnographic museum since the 1970s. New pallozas are used mainly as holiday homes, even in remote areas, where they were not traditionally used.

== See also ==
- Roundhouse (dwelling)
- Rondavel
