= Campo =

Campo may refer to:

== Places ==
Cameroon

- Campo, Cameroon, in the South Province

Equatorial Guinea

- Río Campo, in the Litoral Province

France

- Campo, Corse-du-Sud, a commune on the island of Corsica

Italy

- Campo P.G., a World War II prisoner-of-war camp
- Campo, Cortina d'Ampezzo, a frazione in the province of Belluno, Veneto
- Campo, San Giuliano Terme, a frazione in the province of Pisa, Tuscany
- Campo (Venice), a type of square

Philippines

- Campo Islam, a barangay in the Zamboanga City

Portugal

- Campo (Reguengos de Monsaraz), a parish in the municipality of Reguengos de Monsaraz
- Campo (São Martinho), a former civil parish in the municipality of Santo Tirso
- Campo (Valongo), a parish in the municipality of Valongo
- Campo (Viseu), a parish in the municipality of Viseu
- Campo e Tamel (São Pedro Fins), a civil parish in the municipality of Barcelos

Spain

- Campo, Aragon, a municipality in the province of Huesca
- Campo del Agua, a municipality in the province of León
- Campo de Villavidel, a municipality in the province of León

Switzerland

- Campo, Vallemaggia, a municipality in the district of Vallemaggia in the canton of Ticino

United States

- Campo, California
  - Campo Indian Reservation, in southern California
- Campo, Colorado
- Campo's, a delicatessen in Philadelphia, Pennsylvania

== People ==
- David Campese (born 1962), Australian rugby player, nicknamed 'Campo'
- Campo (surname), surname

== Art, entertainment, and media ==
- Campo (musical project), a musical project by Juan Campodónico and Bajofondo

== Education ==
- Campolindo High School or Campo, a large public high school in Moraga, California

== Organizations ==
- Capital Area Metropolitan Planning Organization (CAMPO) in Texas

== See also ==
- Campo Grande (disambiguation)
- Campo Maior (disambiguation)
- Cambo (disambiguation)
- Campos (disambiguation)
- Kambo (disambiguation)
- Kampos (disambiguation)
