= Del Campo (surname) =

Del Campo is a surname of Spanish origin meaning "from the field". Notable people with the surname include:

- Adolfo del Campo (born 1981), Spanish physicist and a professor
- Alisha del Campo (born 1999), Filipino footballer
- Carlos Ibáñez del Campo (1877 – 1960), President of Chile
- César del Campo (1922–2008), Cuban film actor.
- Conrado del Campo (1878 – 1953), Spanish composer, violinist and pedagogue
- Edmundo Deville del Campo (born 1959), Peruvian naval officer
- Estanislao del Campo (1834 –1880), Argentine poet
- Federico del Campo (1837-1923), Peruvian painter
- Franco Del Campo (born 1949), Italian journalist, writer, professor and retired backstroke swimmer and coach.
- Gonzalo del Campo (died 1627), Roman Catholic Archbishop
- Igor Gabilondo del Campo (born 1979), Spanish retired professional footballer
- Javier Iturriaga del Campo (born 1965), Chilean military general
- Joe Del Campo (born 1943), American FBI agent and private investigator
- José María del Campo (1826 – 1884), Argentine priest and Unitarian Party leader
- Margarita Ester Zavala Gómez del Campo, Mexican lawyer and politician
- Mariana Gómez del Campo (born 1978), Mexican politician affiliated with the PAN
- Martín del Campo, (born 1975), former Uruguayan footballer
- Matias del Campo, Chilean born Austrian architect, designer and educator
- José Miguel González Martín del Campo (born 1963), Spanish former professional footballer
- Pablo del Campo, Argentine advertising executive, entrepreneur, and author
- Pedro del Campo (died 1551), Spanish Roman Catholic bishop
- Ramón Martín del Campo (born 1993), Mexican former professional footballer.
- Raúl del Campo (born 1982), Spanish retired professional footballer
- Roberto Abel Martin Del Campo Cardenas (born 1967), Mexican chess player
- Rubén del Campo, (born 2000), Swiss professional footballer
- Samuel del Campo (1882 – 1972), Chilean diplomat
- Sara del Campo (1855 – 1942), First Lady of Chile and the wife of President Pedro Montt
- Sofía Rivera Torres Martin del Campo, (born 1992), TV presenter, radio host, internet celebrity and reality television personality
- Valeria del Campo (2000), Costa Rican footballer
- Victor DelCampo (born 1977), American bodybuilding champion

== See also ==
- Del Campo (disambiguation)
- Campi (surname)
- Campo (surname)
- Juan del Campo
- Duchamp (surname), French counterpart
- Van de Velde, Dutch counterpart
