= Campo (surname) =

Campo is a surname. Notable people with the surname include:

- Bobby Campo (born 1983), American actor
- Dave Campo (born 1947), American coach in American football
- Iván Campo (born 1974), Spanish footballer
- John P. Campo (1938–2005), American racehorse trainer
- Lode Campo (1926–2009), Belgian business executive
- Massimo Campo (born 1975), Italian footballer
- Pancho Campo (born 1961), Spanish event organiser
- Pupi Campo (1920–2011), Cuban musician and dancer
- Rafael Campo (1813–1890), El Salvadorian politician
- Rafael Campo Miranda (1918–2024), Colombian songwriter
- Régis Campo (born 1968), French composer
- Roberto Martín del Campo (born 1967), Mexican chess master
- Wally Campo (1923–2023), American actor

== See also ==
- Campo (disambiguation)
- Campi (surname)
- Del Campo (surname)
