= Campo Grande (disambiguation) =

Campo Grande (Big Field in Portuguese and Spanish) is the capital city of the state of Mato Grosso do Sul, Brazil.

Campo Grande may also refer to:

== Places ==
=== Argentina ===
- Campo Grande, Misiones
- Campo Grande, Río Negro

=== Brazil ===
- Campo Grande, Alagoas
- Campo Grande, Rio Grande do Norte
- Campo Grande, Rio de Janeiro, a neighborhood
- Campo Grande (district of São Paulo)
- Campo Grande (square), in Salvador
- Campo Grande Air Force Base, in Campo Grande, Mato Grosso do Sul
- Campo Grande International Airport, in Campo Grande, Mato Grosso do Sul

=== Other countries ===
- Campo Grande, Lisbon, a parish in Lisbon, Portugal
- Campo Grande (Valladolid), a park in Valladolid, Spain

== Other uses ==
- Campo Grande (film), a 2015 Brazilian-French film
- Campo Grande (Lisbon Metro), a railway station in Lisbon, Portugal
- Campo Grande Atlético Clube, a Brazilian football club
