= Del Campo =

Del Campo may refer to:

- Del Campo (surname), Spanish language surname
- Del Campo Peak, prominent summit in North Cascades, Washington state, United States of America
- Del Campo High School, public high school in Fair Oaks, California, United States of America
- Del Campo's leaf-toed gecko, species of lizard in the family Phyllodactylidae
- DelCampo International School, private school located in the region of Tegucigalpa, Honduras

== See also ==
- Campo (disambiguation)
