= Campi (surname) =

Surname

Campi is an Italian surname. Notable people with the surname include:

- Alex de Campi, British-born American music video director, comic writer and columnist
- Antonia Campi (1773–1822), Polish operatic soprano
- Emidio Campi (born 1943), Swiss historian
- Gastón Campi (born 1991), Argentine professional footballer
- Grégory Noel Campi (born 1974), Monégasque former professional footballer
- Gretel Campi (born 1984), Cuban biologist and footballer
- Horacio Campi (1917–?), Argentine sailor
- José Luis Campi (born 1971), Argentine former professional footballer
- Lou Campi (1905–1989), Italian professional bowler
- Marco Claudio Campi, Italian engineer and mathematician
- Marji Campi (born 1938), English actress
- Michelle Campi (born 1976), American artistic gymnast
- Pier Paolo Campi (1668–1764), Italian Baroque sculptor
- Ray Campi (1934–2021), American singer and musician

== See also ==
- Campi (disambiguation)
- Campo (surname)
