= Campi =

Campi may refer to:

== People ==
- Campi (surname), a surname

Campi was a family of painters, distinguished in the annals of Italian art at Cremona in the 16th century. Some members are:

- Antonio Campi (Cavaliere) (1536 – c.1591), Italian painter; brother and student of Giulio Campi
- Galeazzo Campi (1477–1536), Italian painter
- Giulio Campi (1502–1572), Italian painter
- Pier Paolo Campi (1668–1764), Italian sculptor
- Vincenzo Campi (1536–1591), Italian painter; brother and student of Giulio Campi

Also:

- Martín Campilongo, Argentine humourist known as "Campi"
- Campi (surname), Italian surname

== Places ==
- Campi, Haute-Corse, a commune of the Haute-Corse département in France
- Campi (Norcia), a frazione of Norcia, province of Perugia, Umbria, Italy
- Campi Flegrei, volcanic area near Naples

== Other uses ==
- Campi, a nonstandard plural form of campus
- Campi, collective name for the Adrabaecampi and Parmaecampi
- Editoriale Campi, Italian publishing house
