= Juan del Campo =

Juan del Campo may refer to:

- Juan del Campo (field hockey) (1923–2010), Spanish field hockey player
- Juan del Campo (bishop) (died 1334)
- Juan del Campo (skier) (born 1994), Spanish alpine ski racer
- Juan Manuel Martín del Campo (1917 – 1996), Mexican Roman Catholic priest and exorcist

== See also ==
- Del Campo (disambiguation)
- Del Campo (surname)
