= Kampos =

Kampos may refer to:

- Kampos (Thrace), a town of ancient Thrace, near Constantinople
- Kampos, Cyprus, a village in Nicosia District
- Kampos, Elis, a village in Elis
- Kampos, Karditsa, a municipal unit in the Karditsa regional unit
- Kampos, Messenia, a village in Messenia
- Kampos, Tinos, a village on the island of Tinos, Cyclades
- Kampos, Ikaria, a village on the Ikaria island, Southern Sporades
