= Duchamp (surname) =

Duchamp is a surname of French origin meaning "from the field". Notable people with the surname include:

- Alexina Duchamp (1906–1995), American art dealer
- L. Timmel Duchamp (born 1950), American author
- Marcel Duchamp (1887–1968), French artist
- Raymond Duchamp-Villon (1876–1918), French sculptor
- Suzanne Duchamp (1889–1963), French painter

== See also ==
- Del Campo (surname), Spanish counterpart
- Van de Velde, Dutch counterpart
