= Sant'Agnese in Agone =

Historic church in Rome, Italy

- Church of Saint Agnes at the Circus Agonalis
- Sant'Agnese in Piazza Navona
- Chiesa di Sant'Agnese in Agone
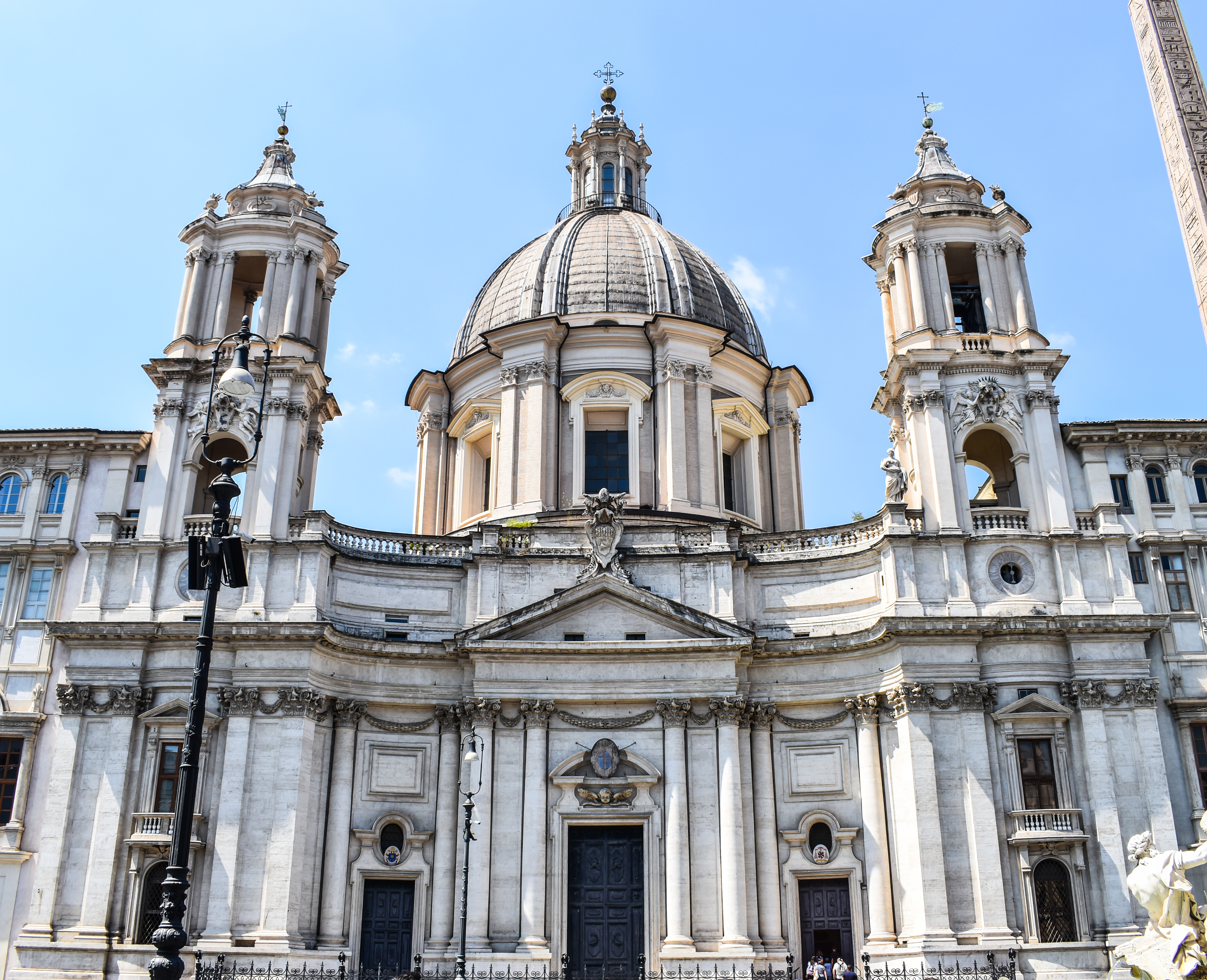
- Sant'Agnese from Piazza Navona
- Click on the map to see marker.
- 41°53′56″N 12°28′21″E
- Location: Via di Santa Maria dell'Anima 30/A,, Rome
- Country: Italy
- Language: Italian
- Denomination: Catholic
- Tradition: Roman Rite
- Website: santagneseinagone.org

History
- Status: titular church
- Founded: early 12th century
- Dedication: Agnes of Rome
- Consecrated: 28 January 1123

Architecture
- Architect(s): Girolamo Rainaldi, Carlo Rainaldi, Borromini, Bernini
- Style: Baroque
- Completed: 1859

Administration
- Diocese: Rome

Sant'Agnese in Agone (also called Sant'Agnese in Piazza Navona) is a 17th-century Baroque church in Rome, Italy. It faces onto the Piazza Navona, one of the main urban spaces in the historic centre of the city and the site where the Early Christian Saint Agnes was martyred in the ancient Stadium of Domitian. Construction began in 1652 under the architects Girolamo Rainaldi and his son Carlo Rainaldi. After numerous quarrels, the other main architect involved was Francesco Borromini.

The church is a titular deaconry, with Gerhard Ludwig Müller being the current Cardinal-Deacon. As well as religious services, the church hosts regular classical concerts in the Borromini Sacristy, from sacred Baroque works to chamber music and operas.

== History ==
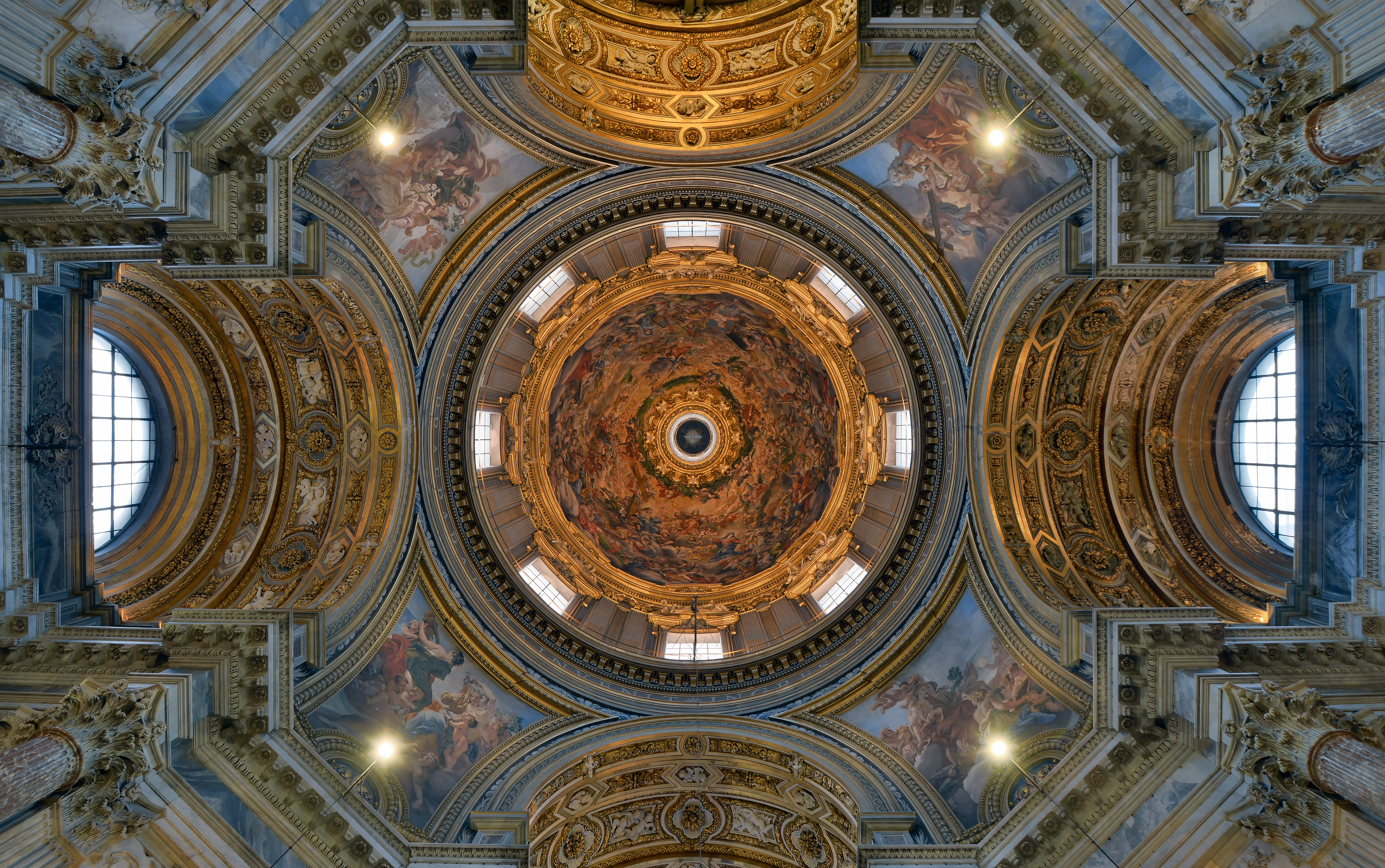
View into frescoed cupola and pendentives; apse on left, entrance with organ and tomb of Pope Innocent X on right

The building of the church was begun in 1652 at the instigation of Pope Innocent X whose family palace, the Palazzo Pamphili, is adjacent to this church. The church was to be effectively a family chapel annexed to their residence (for example, an opening was formed in the drum of the dome so the family could participate in the religious services from their palace).

The first designs for a centralised Greek Cross church were prepared by the Pamphili family architect, Girolamo Rainaldi, and his son Carlo Rainaldi in 1652. They reorientated the main entrance to the church from the Via Santa Maria dell’Anima, a street set one urban block away from the piazza, to the Piazza Navona, a large urban space that Innocent was transforming into a showcase associated with his family. It had been the intention to build the new church over the old church which would become the crypt; this meant the new church was to be raised well above piazza level, but this idea was abandoned once construction started. The original drawings are lost but it is thought that the Piazza Navona façade design included a narthex between two towers and broad stairs descending to the piazza.

Harsh criticism was made of the design, including the steps down to the piazza which were thought to project excessively, so Carlo Rainaldi eliminated the narthex idea and substituted a concave façade so that the steps would not be so intrusive. The idea of the twin towers framing a central dome may be indebted to Bernini's bell towers on the façade of Saint Peter's Basilica. Nonetheless, Rainaldi's design of a concave façade and a central dome framed by twin towers was influential on subsequent church design in Northern Europe. In 1653, the Rainaldis were replaced by Borromini.

Borromini had to work with the Rainaldi ground plan but made adjustments; on the interior for instance, he positioned columns towards the edges of the dome piers which had the effect of creating a broad base to the dome pendentives instead of the pointed base which was the usual Roman solution. His drawings show that on the façade to Piazza Navona, he designed curved steps descending to the piazza, the convex curvature of which play against the concave curvature of the façade to form an oval landing in front of the main entrance. His façade was to have eight columns and a broken pediment over the entrance. He designed the flanking towers as single storey, above which there was to be a complex arrangement of columns and convex bays with balustrades.

By the time of Innocent's death in 1655, the façade had reached the top of the lower order. Innocent's nephew, Camillo Pamphili, failed to take interest in the church and Borromini became disheartened, eventually leading to his resignation in 1657.

Carlo Rainaldi was reappointed and made a number of modifications to Borromini's design including an additional storey to the flanking towers and simplifying their uppermost parts. On the death of Camillo Pamphili, his wife Olimpia Aldobrandini, commissioned Bernini to take over. He was responsible for the straightforward pediment above the main entrance and for the emphatic entablature in the interior.

In 1668, Camillo Borghese (Olimpia's son & Camillo Pomphii's step-son) took over responsibility for the church. He reinstated Carlo Rainaldi as architect and engaged Ciro Ferri to create frescoes for the interior of the dome. Further decorations were added; there were large scale sculptures and polychrome marble effects. None of these are likely to have been intended by Borromini.

== Interior ==
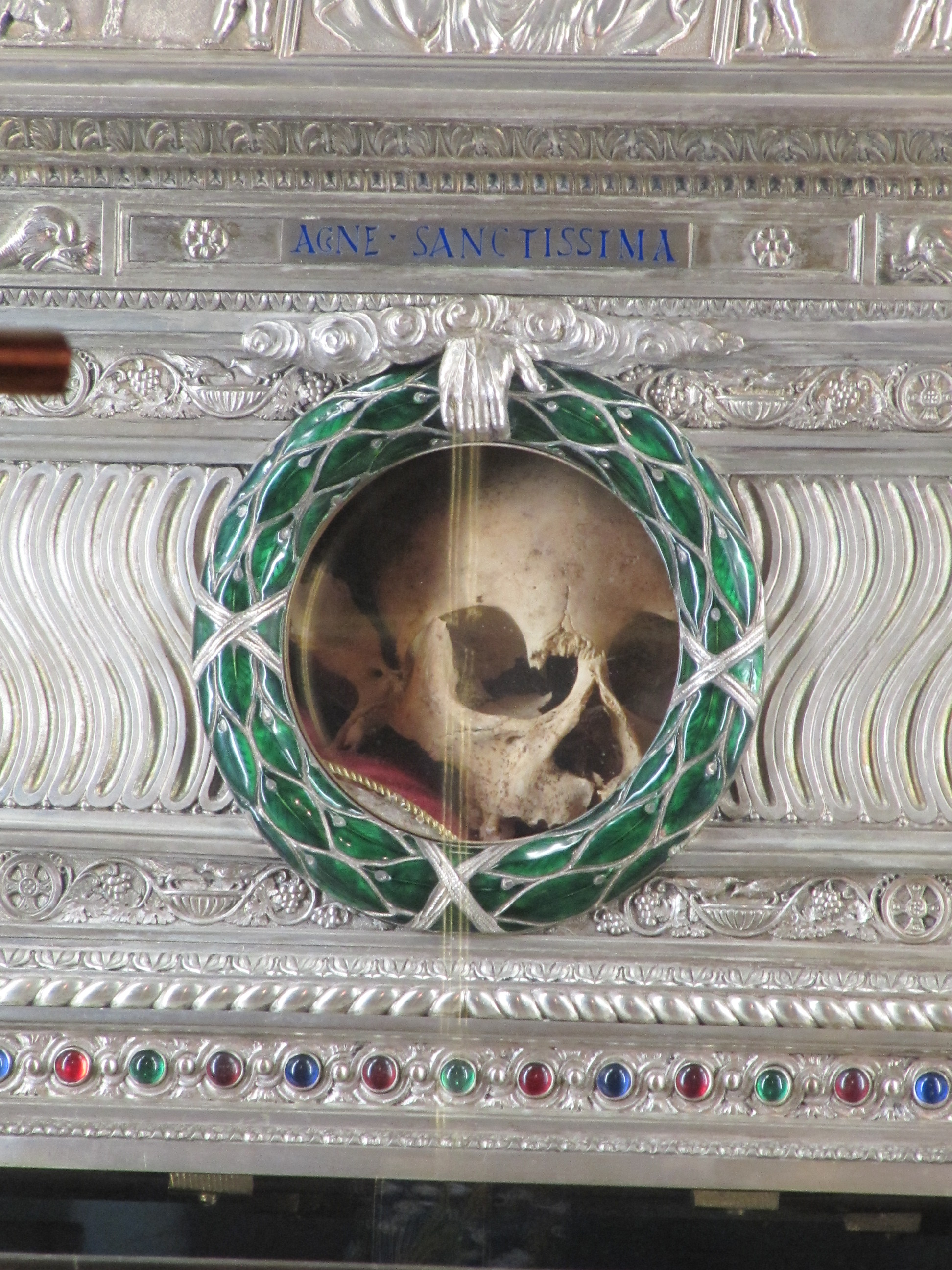
Skull of Saint Agnes

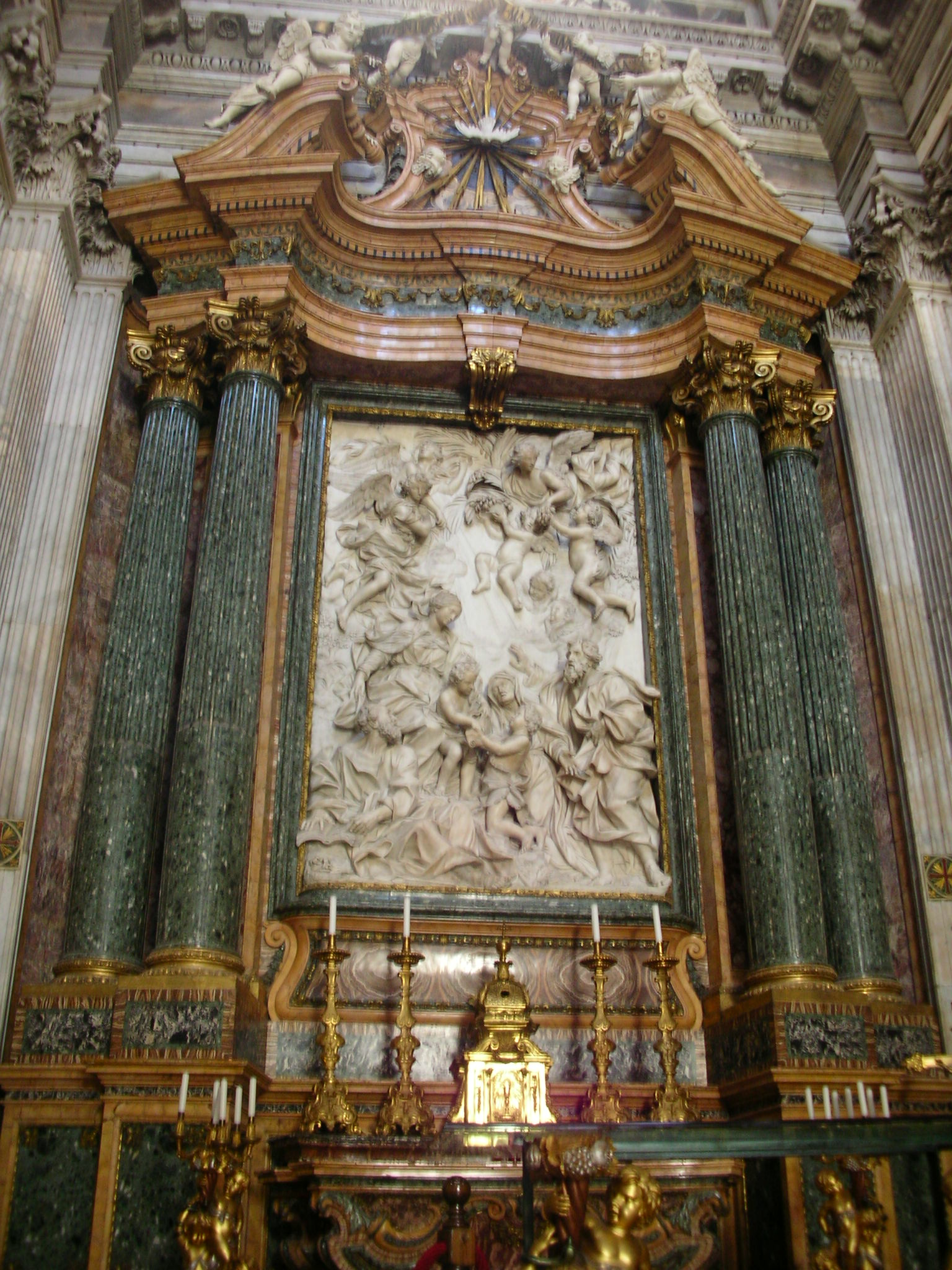
Main altar with the relief of The Holy Family by Domenico Guidi

The cupola is frescoed with the Apotheosis of Saint Agnes, begun in 1670 by Ciro Ferri and finished after his death in 1689 by Sebastiano Corbellini. The pendentives of the dome were painted with the Cardinal Virtues (1662–1672) by Bernini's protégé, Giovanni Battista Gaulli. In the sacristy, there is a painting depicting the Glory of Saint Agnes by Paolo Gismondi.

The near-circular interior, actually a Greek cross design, is circumferentially surrounded by marble sculptural Baroque masterpieces, dedicated to individual martyred saints. There are four altars in the pillars with reliefs, unusually set in semi-circular niches. Among the sculptural decoration are the following:

- The Two Holy Families (1676) by Domenico Guidi – The main altar initially was intended to hold a Miracle of Saint Agnes commissioned from Alessandro Algardi, but who died shortly after receiving the commission. Algardi provided a small model while a full scale plaster model (now in the Oratorio dei Filippini) was made by his assistants Ercole Ferrata and Guidi. For some reason the project for the Miracle ensemble was dropped, and instead Guidi created a marble relief, depicting The Holy Family according to his design.
- Death of Saint Alexius by Giovanni Francesco Rossi is the relief above the first altar on the right.
- Martyrdom of Saint Emerentiana by Ercole Ferrata, with the upper portion completed by Leonardo Reti is on the second altar on the right.
- Martyrdom of Saint Eustace by Melchiorre Cafà is on the first altar on the left. Due to Cafà's sudden early death large parts of the relief were completed by his master, Ferrata, and his workshop.
- Death of Saint Cecilia by Antonio Raggi is on the second altar on the left.
- Saint Agnes on the Pyre by Ercole Ferrata is in the second altar of the transept on the right is the *On the second altar of the transept on the left is the Saint Sebastian (c. 1717–1719) with a statue by Pier Paolo Campi, and also boasts two marble angels by his master Pierre Le Gros which might well be Le Gros' very last works. The statues of Saint Agnes and of Saint Sebastian are placed in an illusionistic architecture of colored marble.
- Tomb Monument of Pope Innocent X (1729) by Giovanni Battista Maini – The monument originally planned on a grand scale, but was executed placed above the main entrance in a far more modest monument.
- The stucco decorations in the niches' semi-domes with angels presenting the symbols of the respective saint are by Ferrata's workshop.

Inside the church is also a shrine for Saint Agnes, containing her skull and a marble relief by Alessandro Algardi.

== Origin of name and legends ==
The name of this church is unrelated to the ‘agony’ of the martyr: in agone was the ancient name of Piazza Navona (piazza in agone), and meant instead, from the Greek, ‘in the site of the competitions’, because Piazza Navona was built on the site of an ancient Roman stadium of the Greek model, with one flat end, and was used for footraces (Latin agōn, "contest"). From ‘in agone’, the popular use and pronunciation changed the name into ‘Navona’, but other roads in the area kept the original name.

Bernini's Fountain of the Four Rivers is situated in front of the church. It is often said that Bernini sculpted the figure of the "Nile" covering his eyes as if he thought the façade designed by his rival Borromini could crumble atop him. This story, like many urban legends, persists because it has a ring of authenticity, despite the fact that Bernini's fountain predates the façade by some years.

Borromini and Bernini became rivals, and more, for architectural commissions. Most prominently, during the Pamphili papacy, an official commission was established to study defects that had arisen in the foundations of the belltowers (built under Bernini's guidance) in the façade of Saint Peter's Basilica. In testimony before the commission, Borromini was one of many harsh critics that assailed the project's engineering. Ultimately, in a severe blow to Bernini's prestige as an architect, the façade bell-towers were torn down, and never rebuilt.

=== Cardinal-Deacons ===
- Lorenzo Cardinal Antonetti 1998–2013
- Gerhard Ludwig Cardinal Müller 2014–present

== Gallery ==
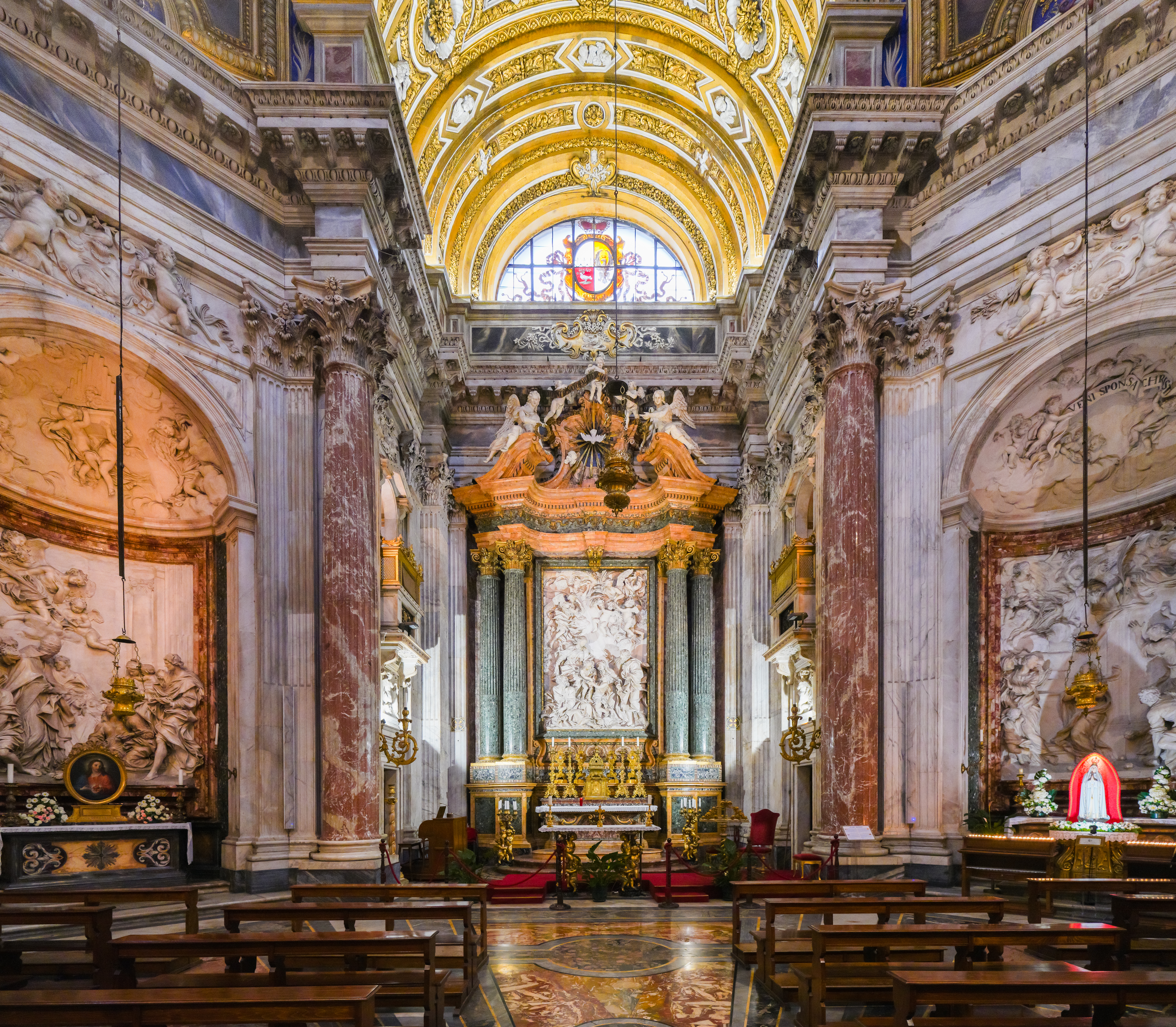
View towards the main altar

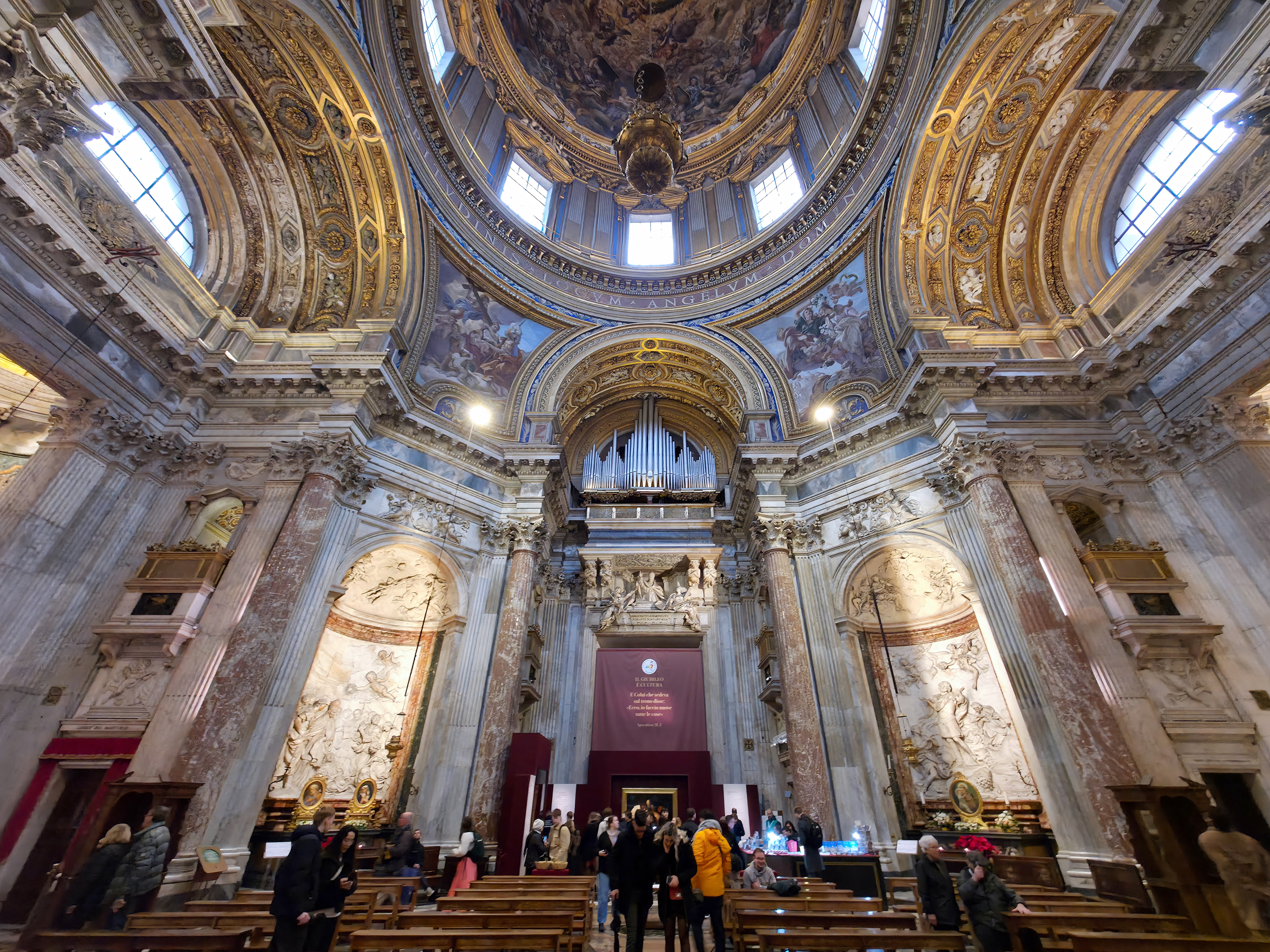
View from the altar to the entrance.

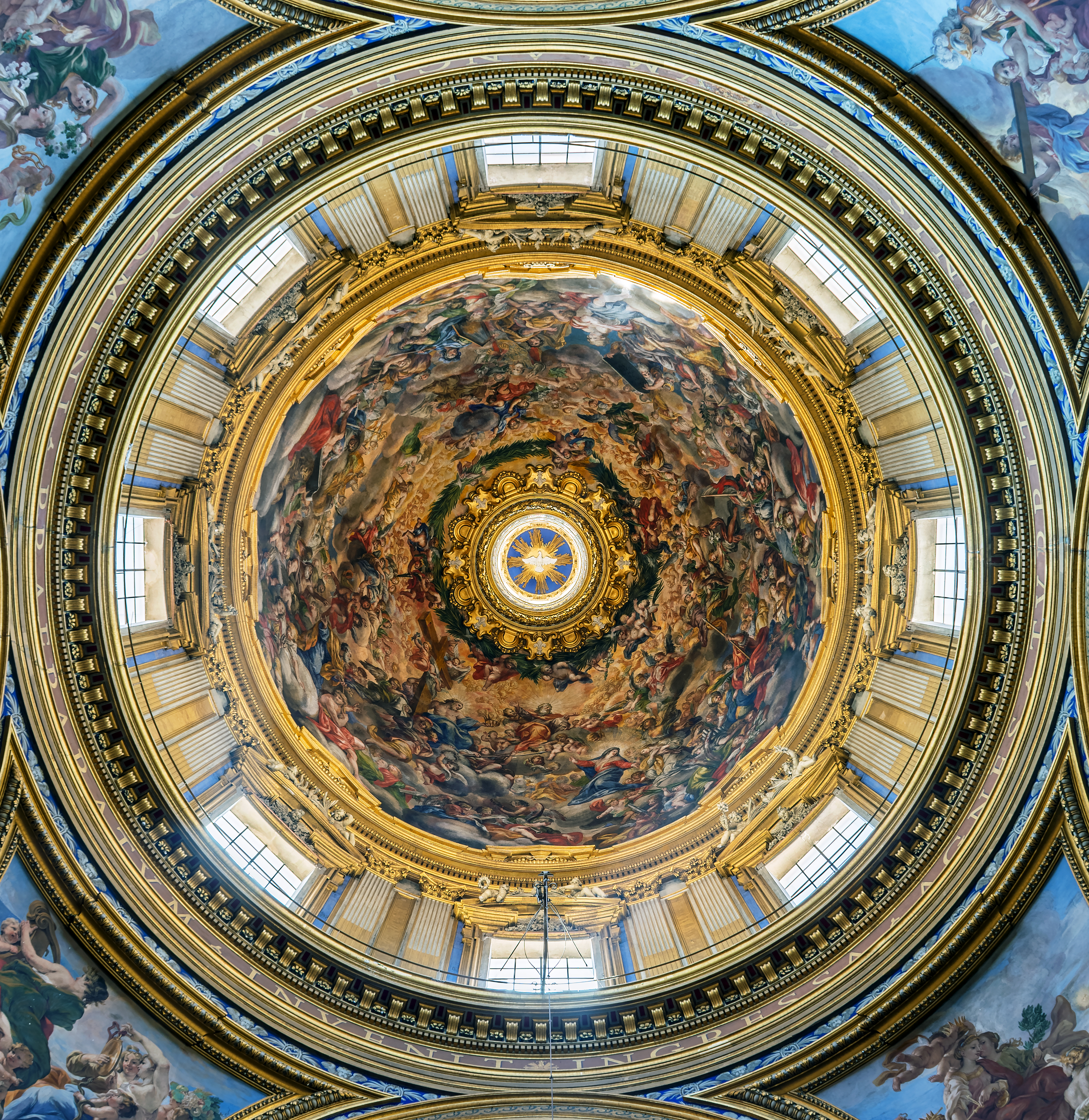
Cupola with Frescos by Ferri

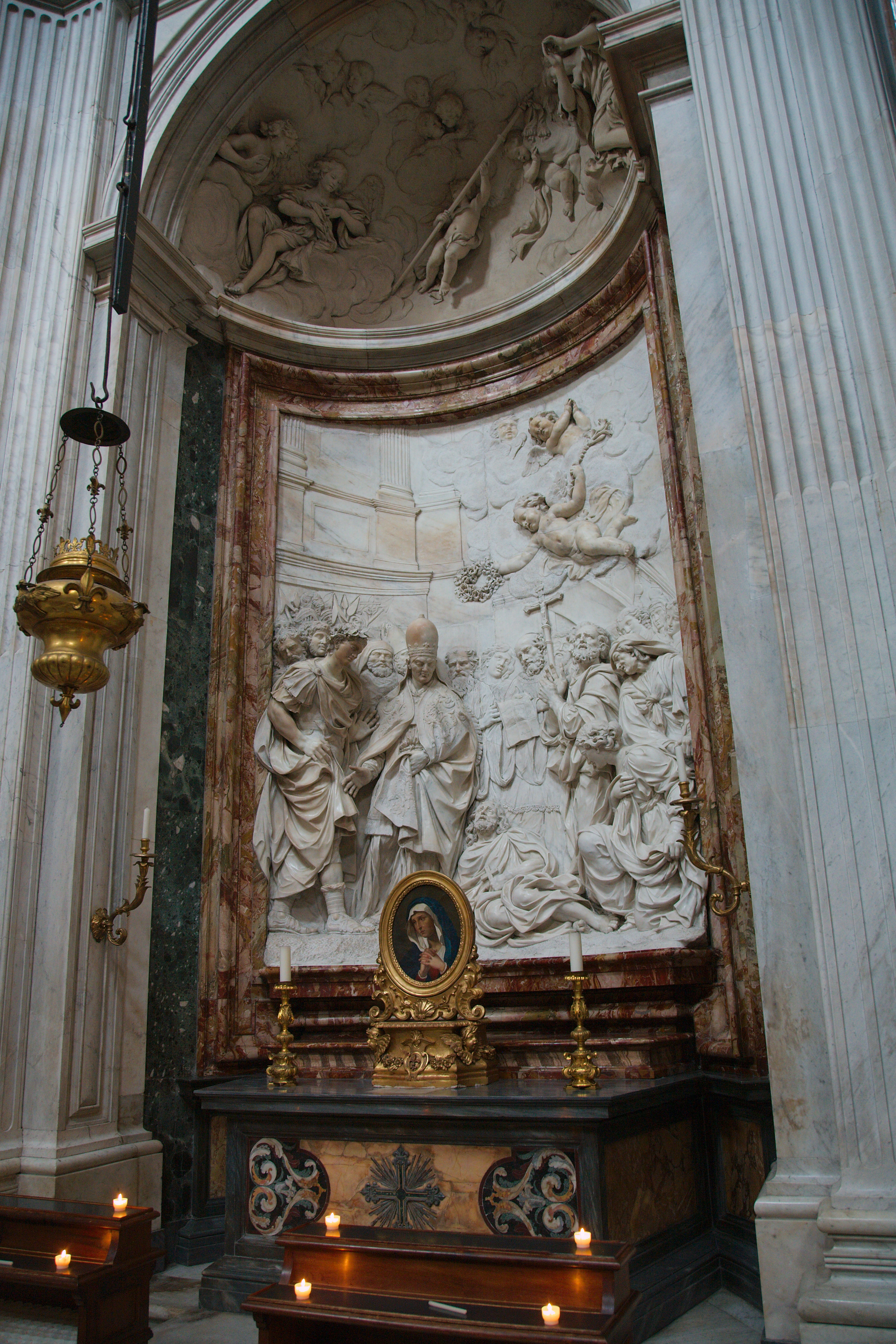
The Death of Saint Alexius by Rossi

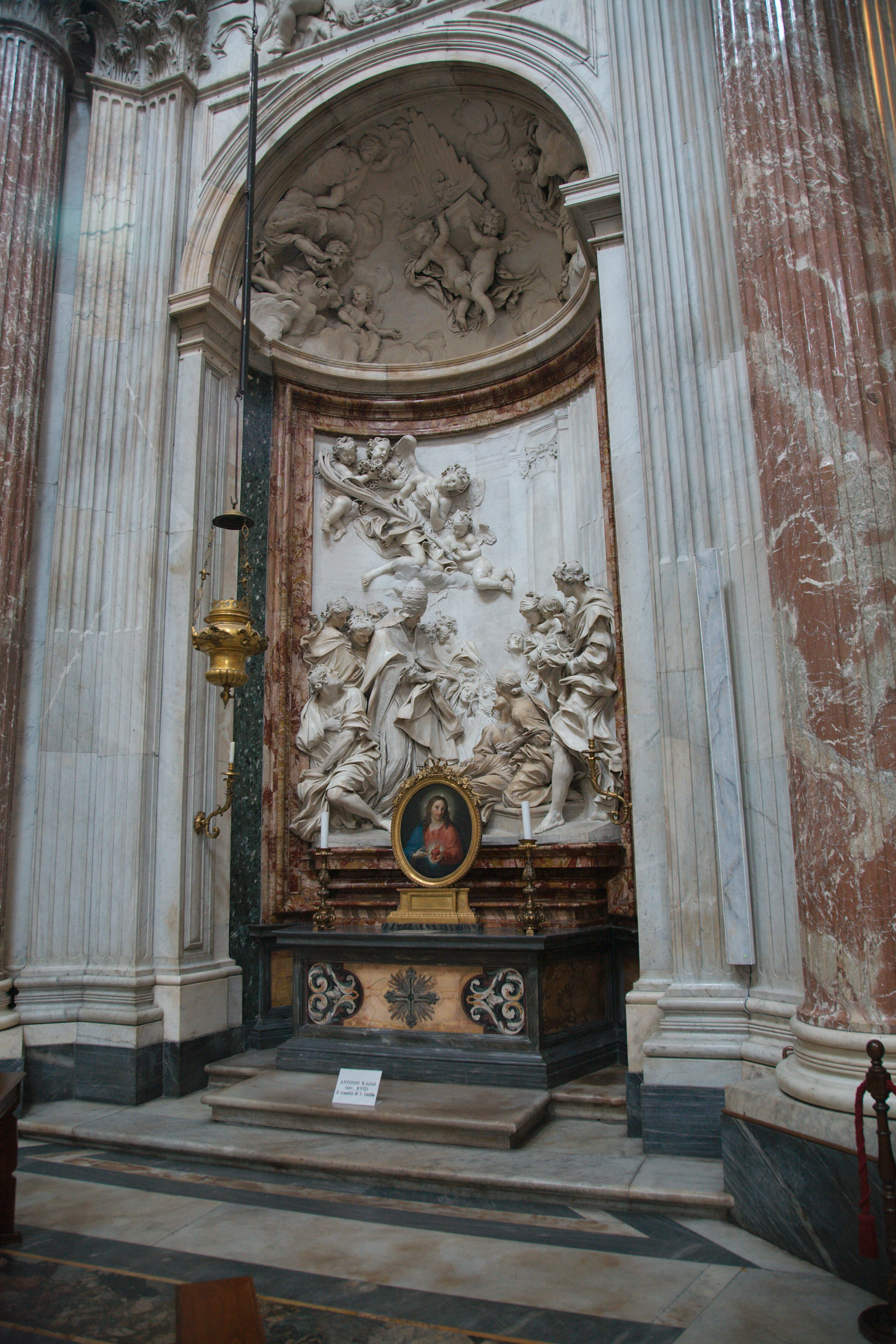
The Death of Saint Cecilia by Raggi

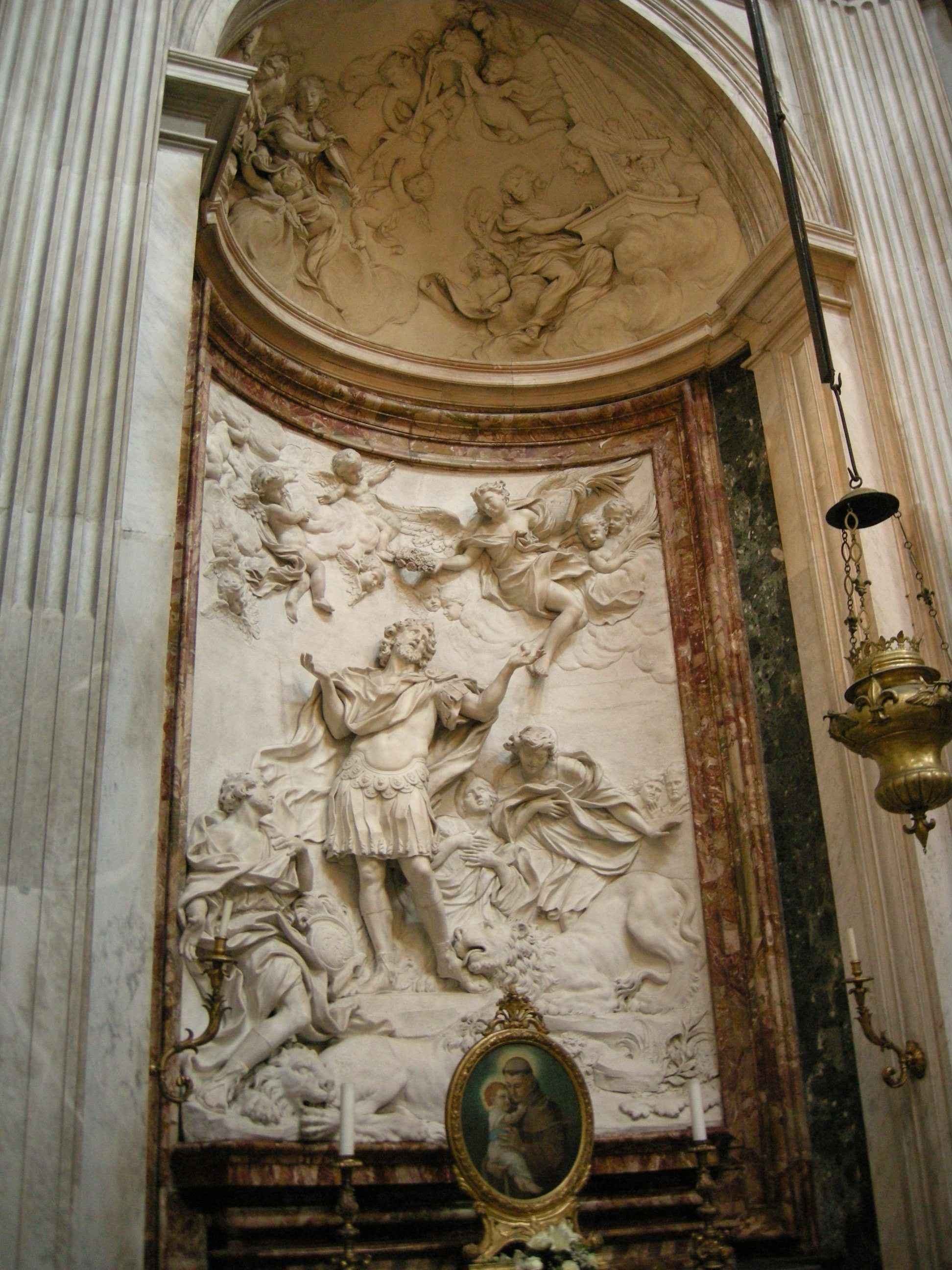
The Martyrdom of Saint Eustace by Cafà

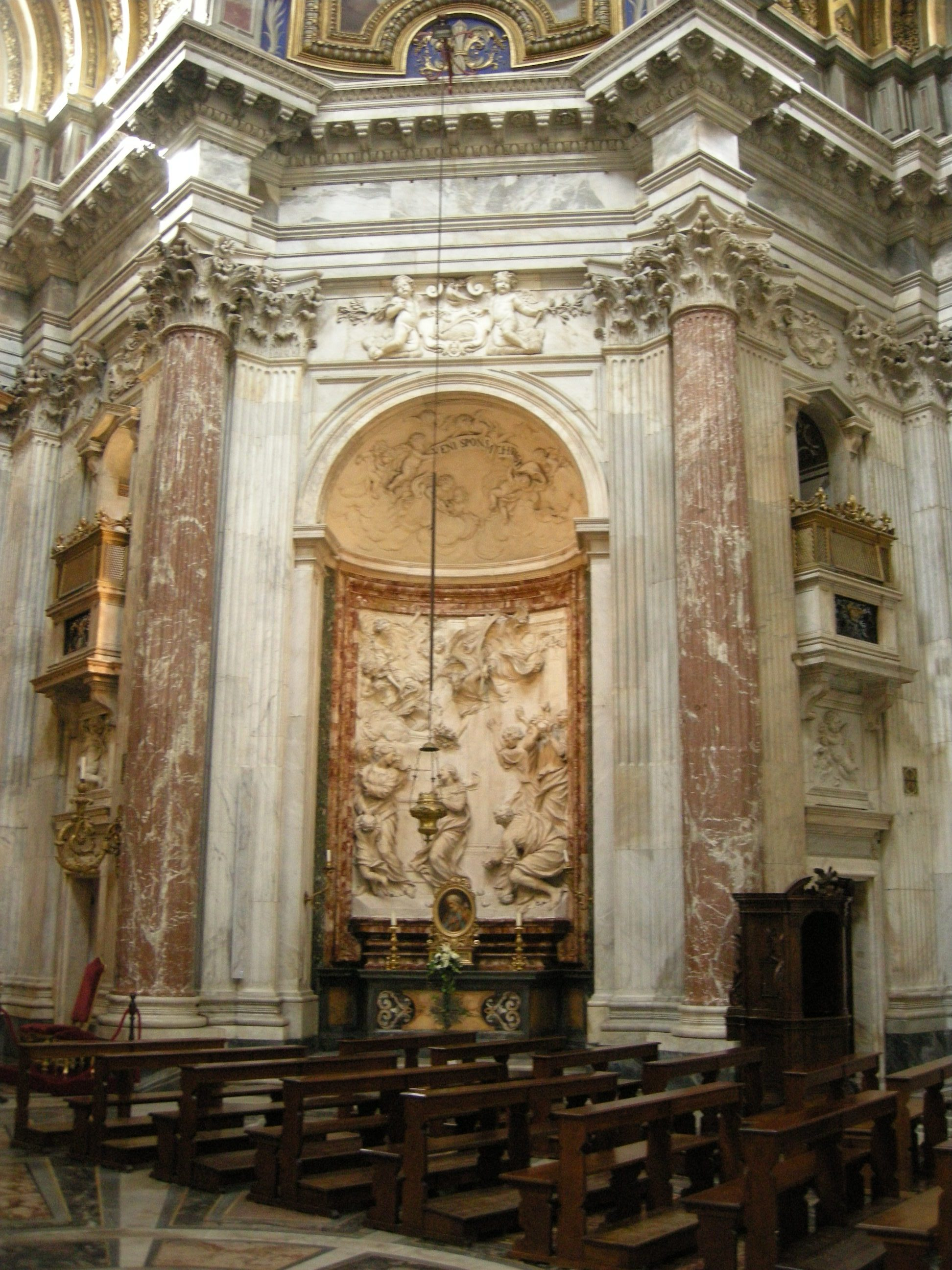
The Martyrdom of Saint Emerentiana by Ferrata

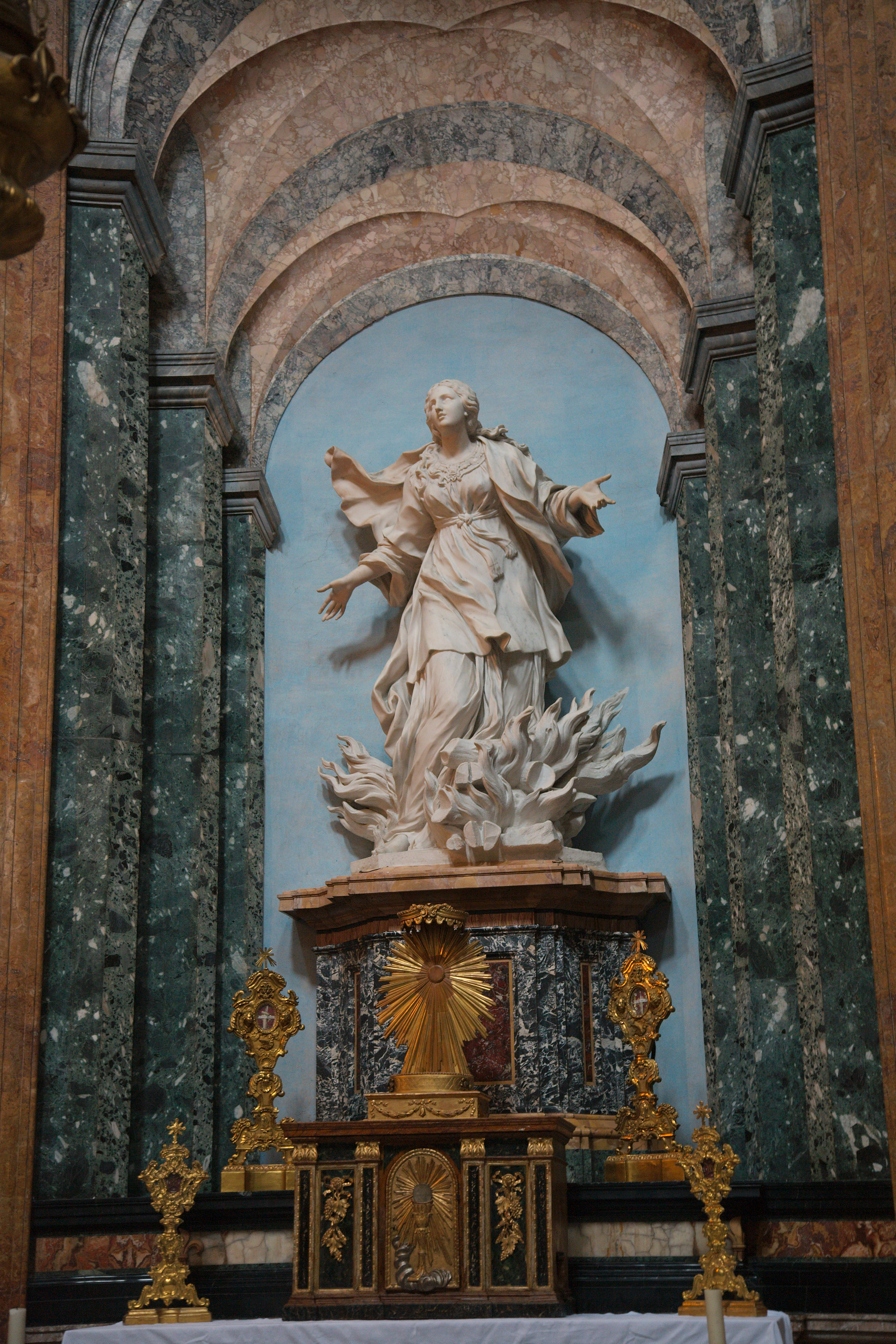
Saint Agnes on the Pyre by Ferrata

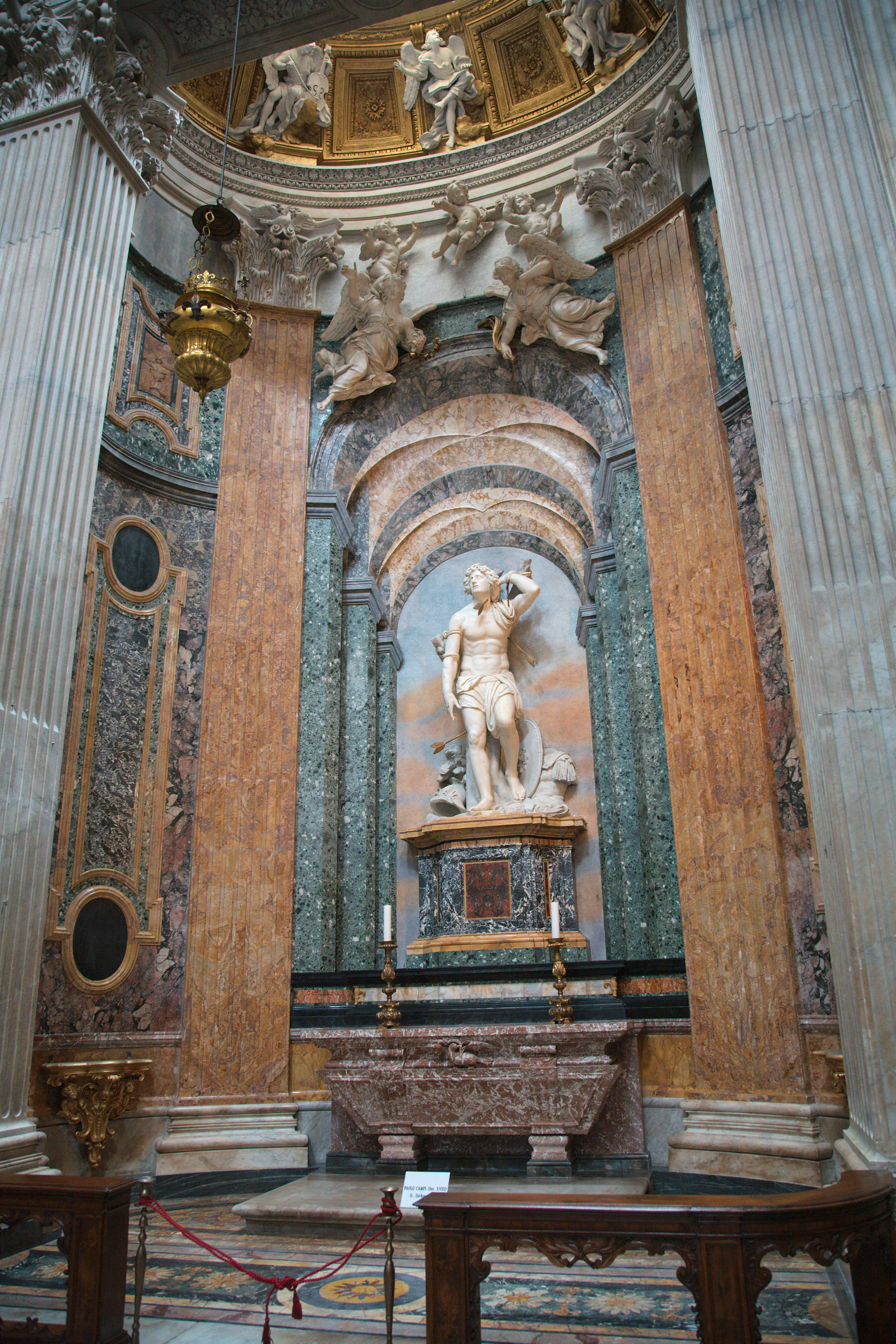
Statue of Saint Sebastian by Campi and Angels by Le Gros

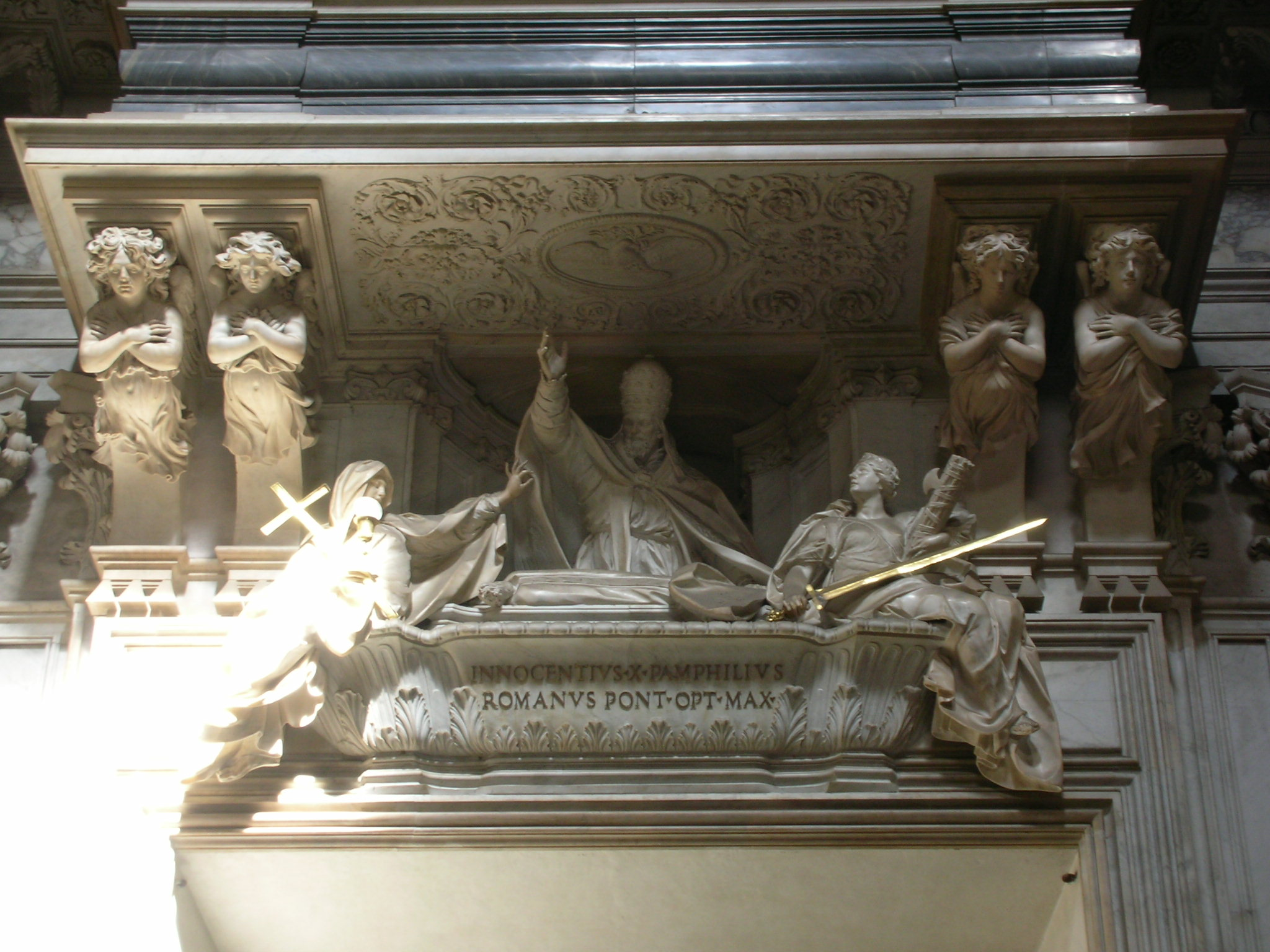
Tomb of Innocent X by Maini

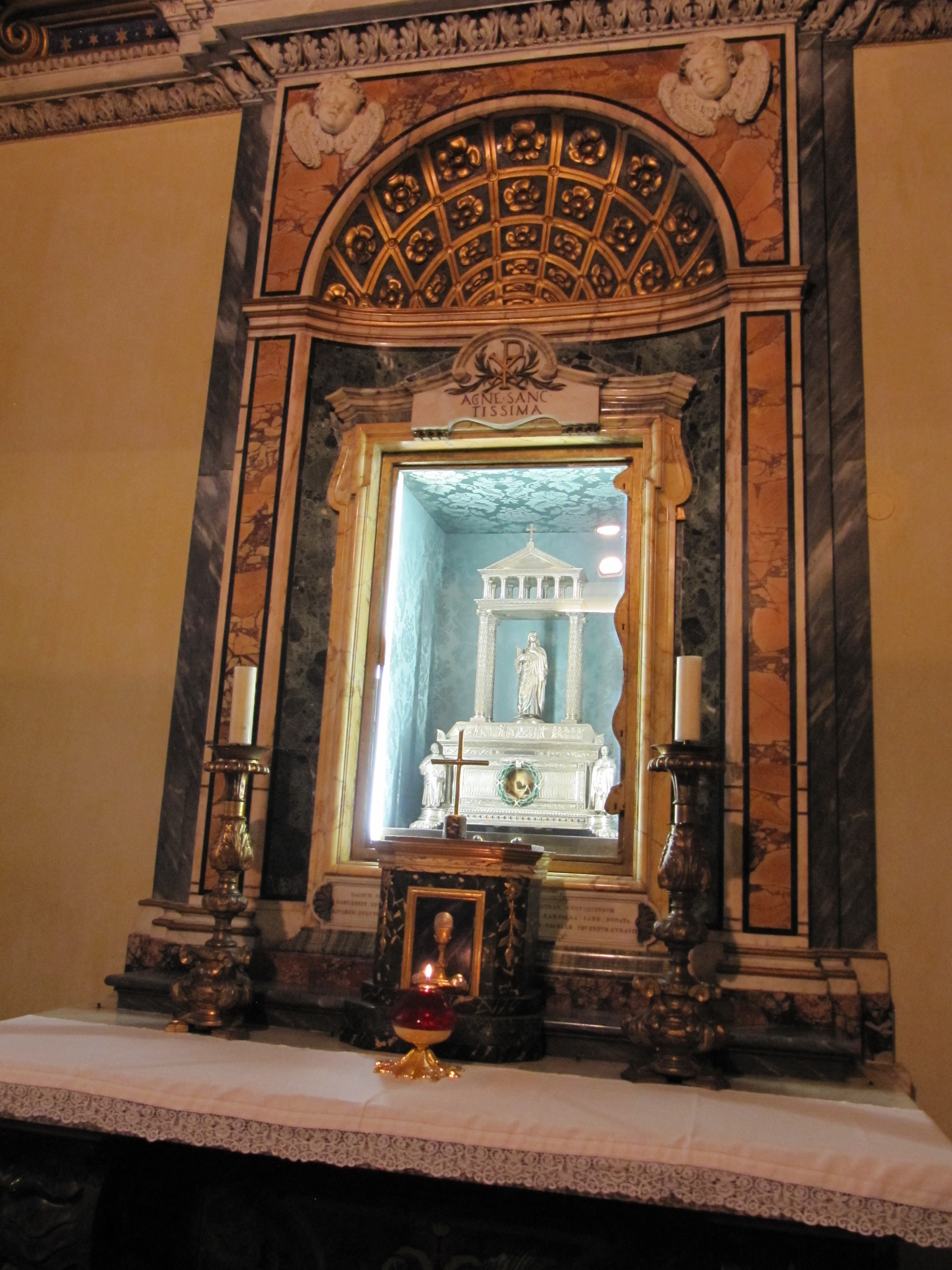
Shrine of Saint Agnes

== See also ==
- Palazzo Pamphilj
- 17th-century Western domes
