= Lode Campo =

Belgian business executive

Baron Lode Campo
- Born: 25 December 1926; Antwerp
- Died: 29 July 2009 (aged 82); Leuven
- Employer: C&A

Lodewijk Petrus Alfons, Baron Campo (25 December 1926 – 29 July 2009) was a Belgian business executive.

He had a degree in commercial and consular relations. He was also a corporate director.

He was married to Rosette Hesbain. They had five children and 10 grandchildren.

== Career ==
He became the chief executive officer of the C&A chain of fashion stores in Belgium in 1951. He was a defender of the Flemish cause in Brussels and was a co-founder and president of the De Warande club.

Campo was also involved in the rescue of the De Standaard newspaper after its bankruptcy and the creation of the Vlaamse Uitgeversmaatschappij (VUM) media group in 1976 through his holding company LORO.

He was a director of Vlaams Economisch Verbond and Katholieke Universiteit Leuven (from 1984 to 2000) and of the Catholic University of Brussels; a director of the Festival van Vlaanderen afdeling Brussel-Leuevn, and a member of the Hoge Raad of University Faculties Saint Ignatius Antwerp.

== Distinctions ==
- 1984: Flemish Order of the Lio
- 1992: André Demedts Prize - Marnixkring
- 1993: ennobled as a baron by King Albert II of Belgium. He chose as his motto Eigen Haard is Goud Waard.
- 2005: honorary doctorate from the Catholic University of Brussels

== Sources ==
- Adelbrieven verleend door Z.M. Albert II, Koning der Belgen, 1993-2000, Paul De Win, Lannoo/Racine, 2001, ISBN 2-87386-271-8
- "Vlaams voorvechter Lode Campo overleden" [Flemish champion Lode Campo is dead]. De Standaard (in Dutch). 31 July 2009.
