= DelCampo International School =

Delcampo School

Location
- Aldea Agua Dulce, Prolongación Colonia Las Hadas, P.O. Box 2100; Tegucigalpa, Francisco Morazán, Honduras; Honduras

Information
- Type: Private Co-educational
- Faculty: 151
- Grades: Pre K-12
- Enrollment: 1300
- Mascot: Wildcats
- Website: http://www.delcamposchool.org

DelCampo School (DCS) is a private school located in the region of Tegucigalpa, Honduras. DCS is also a college preparatory school with English and Spanish as the primary languages of instruction. The program of study offers students the opportunity to graduate with an American high school diploma as well as the "Bachillerato" degree, which fulfills requirements of the Honduran Ministry of Education. DelCampo School has entered into the field of adult and continuing education.

According to one writer, the school is only accessible to the children of the Honduran elite.

== Accreditation ==
- SACS CASI - Southern Association of Colleges & Schools Council on Accreditation & School Improvement

== School Membership ==
- OACAC (Overseas Association for College Admission Counselors)
- FENIEPH (Federación Nacional de Instituciones Educativas de Honduras)
- ABSH (Association of Bilingual Schools of Honduras)
- AASCA (The Association of American Schools of Central America)
- NHS (National Honor Society)
- Ministry of Education
