= Campo de Villavidel =

Campo de Villavidel Campu de Villavidel
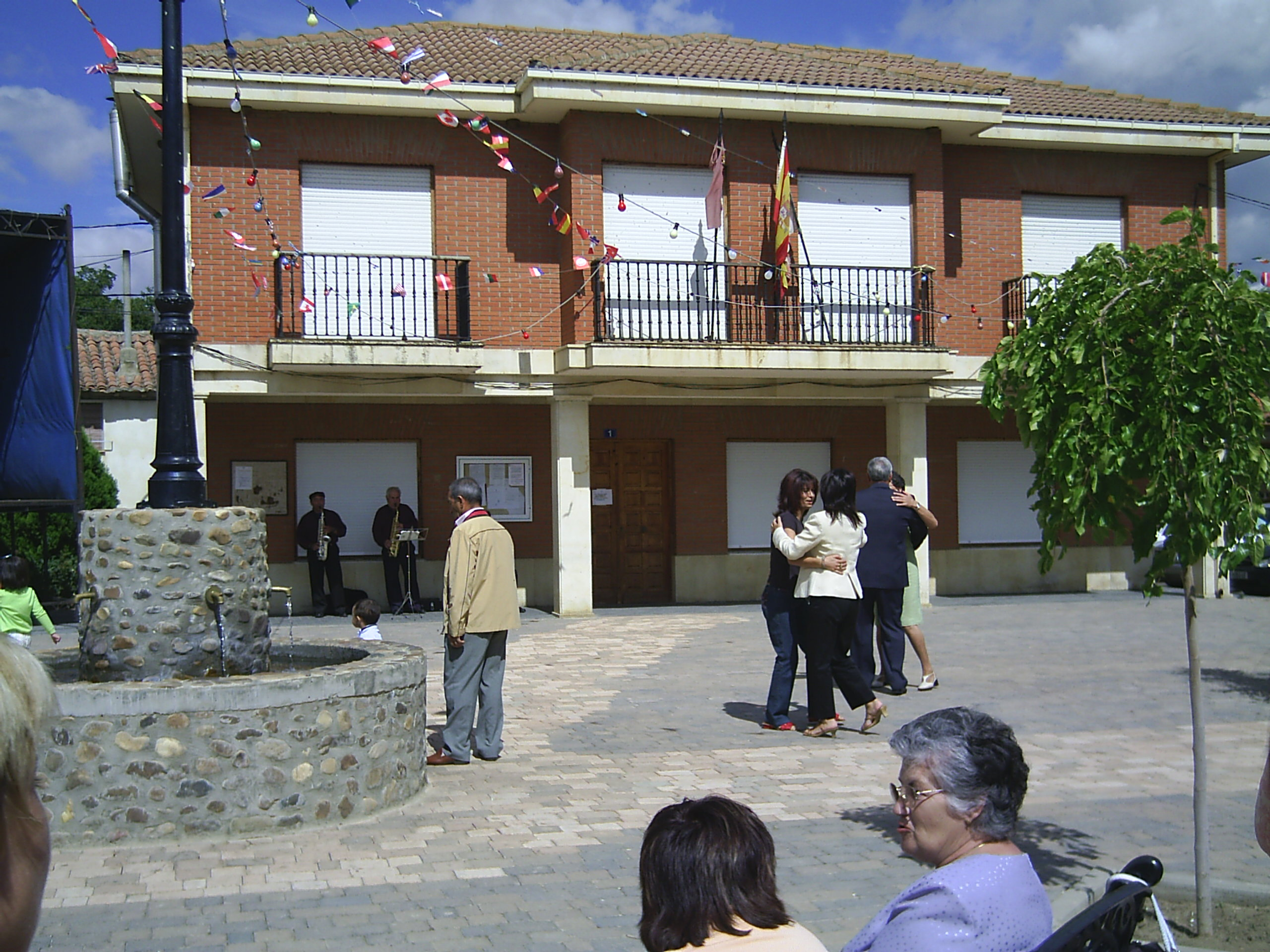
- Town hall

- Location within Spain
- Coordinates: 42°26′23″N 5°31′34″W
- Country: Spain
- Autonomous community: Castile and León
- Province: León
- Municipality: Campo de Villavidel

Government
  - Mayor: Constancio Cañas Santos (PSOE)

Area
  - Total: 13.97 km^{2} (5.39 sq mi)
- Elevation: 768 m (2,520 ft)

Population (2025-01-01)
  - Total: 209
  - Density: 15.0/km^{2} (38.7/sq mi)
- Time zone: UTC+1 (CET)
  - Summer (DST): UTC+2 (CEST)
- Postal Code: 24225
- Telephone prefix: 987

Campo de Villavidel (Spanish pronunciation: [ˈkampo ðe βiʎaβiˈðel], Leonese: Campu de Villavidel) is a municipality located in the province of León, Castile and León, Spain. According to the 2010 census (INE), the municipality has a population of 227 inhabitants.
