= Kampos (Thrace) =

Town of ancient Thrace

Coordinates: 40°59′00″N 28°52′43″E

Kampos was a town of ancient Thrace, inhabited during Byzantine times.

Its site is located near Veliefendi in European Turkey.
