= Campo Grande, Río Negro =

Coordinates: 37°52′S 67°50′W

Campo Grande (Río Negro)
- Municipality and village
- Interactive map of Campo Grande (Río Negro)
- Country: Argentina
- Province: Río Negro Province
- Time zone: UTC−3 (ART)

Campo Grande (Río Negro) is a village and municipality in Río Negro Province in Argentina.
