= Kambo (disambiguation) =

Kambo may refer to:

- Kambo, a village in Moss municipality, Norway
- The Kambo (Kamboj, Kamboh), an ethnic group inhabiting the Punjab region of India and Pakistan
- Kambo, the poisonous secretions of kambô (Phyllomedusa bicolor), a species of hylid frog native to Amazonia
- Syafruddin Kambo (1961–2025), Indonesian politician
