= Victor DelCampo =

American bodybuilder (born 1977)

Victor DelCampo (born December 6, 1977) is an American bodybuilding champion. He has been an active competitor in the sport since 2002 and has participated in the bantamweight, lightweight and welterweight classes.

== Bodybuilding background ==
Born in Wilmington, Delaware, DelCampo began lifting weights at 15, but did not begin to actively pursue bodybuilding as a career until he was 22. He has stated he was originally inspired to pursue bodybuilding by the Incredible Hulk comic books.

DelCampo stands five-foot-three, but in a 2004 interview with Delaware Today magazine he noted his height has never been a competitive problem. “I can pack on a lot of muscle on a smaller frame and appear bigger than the taller guy,” he said. “Someone five-foot-three at 200 pounds looks a lot more muscular than someone six-feet at 200 pounds."

== Competitive history ==
DelCampo's first two bodybuilding competitions were the 2002 NPC Nationals, where he placed ninth in the bantamweight class, and the NPC Team Universe Championships, where he placed fifth in the bantamweight division. He won his first championship title in 2003 in the bantamweight division of the NPC Junior USAs, and has since competed in the 2004 Team Universe Championships (finishing fourth as a lightweight), the 2005 NPC USA Championships (finishing second as a welterweight), the 2006 NPC Nationals (finishing third as a welterweight), and the 2007 NPC Nationals (finishing fifth as a welterweight), and 2008 USAs (placing 2nd as a welterweight). In 2009 Victor placed 3rd at the NPC national championships held in Hollywood, Fl. In 2010 victor placed 5th in the welterweight class at the NPC nationals. IN 2011 victor won the USA championships welter weight title and placed 2nd at the nationals. This makes it 10 straight years of top 5 or better placings in an NPC national event with two top honors. With these placings in 2011 Victor has solidified his spot as the best welterweight in the nation going into 2012.

DelCampo was forced to withdraw from the 2003 NPC Nationals, when he collapsed in the backstage area prior to the start of the competition. He later blamed his condition on dehydration resulting from a restrictive training diet."

DelCampo has been praised by the bodybuilding media for his classical physique. Flex magazine, covering the 2005 USA Championships, commented that “DelCampo displayed the widest set of clavicles in the class and a super thick back. Overall, he had a physique that harkened back to the days before the term ‘GH gut’ entered into the bodybuilding lexicon.”

== Between tournaments ==
DelCampo currently lives in Chichester, Pennsylvania with his wife Teresa & son Troy, and works as a personal trainer in between his bodybuilding competitions; his bodybuilding training is supported with corporate sponsorship by ( muscle mafia, CJ elite competition suits, and pro source ).

He has a sister named Desiree.

Victors next competition will be the 2012 NPC USA championships in Las Vegas in July. You can follow his prep with weekly pictures via his website: victordelcampo.net
