= Campo Maior =

Campo Maior may refer to:

- Campo Maior, Portugal, a municipality in the Portalegre District, Alentejo Region, Portugal.
- Campo Maior, Piauí, a municipality in the state of Piauí in the Northeast region of Brazil.
- Castle of Campo Maior, a medieval military fortification, in the civil parish of São João Bapista, municipality of Campo Maio
- Battle of Campo Maior, was a battle occurred in Campo Maior, Portugal on 25 March 1811.
- Roman Catholic Diocese of Campo Maior, a diocese located in the city of Campo Maior in the Ecclesiastical province of Teresina in Brazil.
