= Cambo =

Cambo may refer to:

- Cambo, Northumberland, a village in Northumberland, England
- Cambo camera, Dutch camera manufacturer
- Cambo Estate, historic house in Fife, Scotland
- Cambo-les-Bains, town in Pyrénées-Atlantiques, France
- Cambo oil field, prospective oil field west of the Shetland Islands in Scotland

== See also ==
- Francesc Cambó (1876–1947), Spanish Catalan politician and cultural benefactor
