= Antonia Campi =

Polish soprano (1773–1822)

Antonia Campi, née Antonina Miklasiewicz (10 December 1773 – 1 October 1822) was a Polish operatic soprano.

== Life ==
Born in Lublin, she began her career in 1785 in Lublin. In 1788, she became a singer at the court of Stanisław August Poniatowski in Warsaw. In 1789, she studied at the Royal School of Singing. She quickly became a celebrity in Poland as well as abroad for her unusual voice: she could sing three octaves. She was invited to perform in Warsaw and also in concerts around Prague, where she settled in 1791, in the company of the impresario Guardoni There she married the first singer of the opera, the bass Gaetano Campi. 2 February 1791. They had 17 children, with 4 pairs of twins and once triplets.

At the opening of the new theatre built by Emanuel Schikaneder in Vienna on 13 June 1801, she came to sing the role of Clara in Franz Teyber's opera Alessandro. The Italian composer Ferdinando Paer wrote especially for her the opera Sargino, ossia l'allievo d'amore (Vienna, 1803).

From 1818 to 1822 she was engaged as prima donna at the court theatre in Vienna. In 1818, she was appointed first imperial singer (erste kaiserliche Sängerin).

In 1817 and 1820, Campi made an artistic trip to Europe: to Italy, Germany (Mannheim in September 1818, Leipzig and Dresden in October 1818) and Poland (Warsaw in September 1820). She was particularly appreciated for her interpretations of Wolfgang Amadeus Mozart's operas.

She died on 1 October 1822 at the age of 48 of meningitis during a tour in Munich.

== Repertoire ==
=== In premieres ===
- Servilia in Mozart's La clemenza di Tito, 6 September 1791 at the National Theatre Prague (under the name Signora Antonini).

=== Other ===
- La Contessa in Le nozze di Figaro,
- Donna Anna in Don Giovanni,
- Constanza in Die Entführung aus dem Serail,
- The Queen of the Night in The Magic Flute,
- Vitellia in La clemenza di Tito.
