= Pancho Campo =

Spanish event organiser and former tennis professional

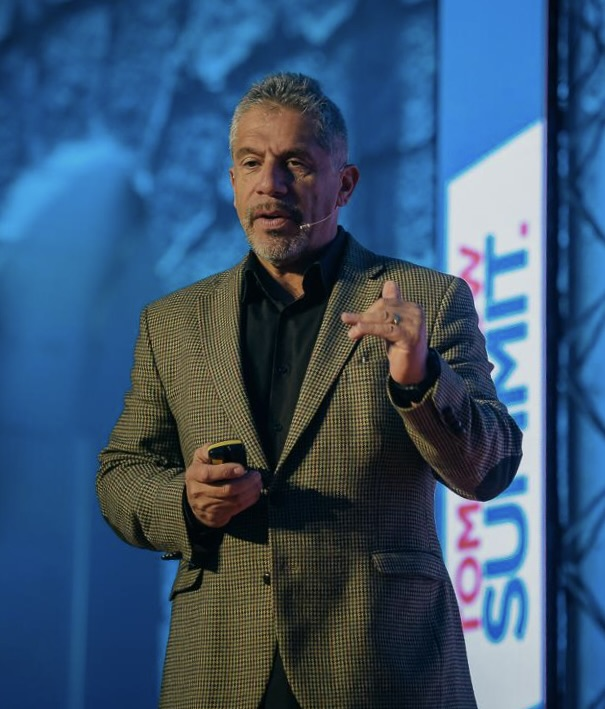
Pancho Campo

Pancho Campo (born Francisco Armando Campo Carrasco in 1963 in Santiago, Chile) is a naturalized Spanish businessman. He founded Chrand Events USA, an agency dedicated to the organization of sporting events, conferences and expeditions.

== Early life and family ==
Pancho Campo was born Francisco Armando Campo Carrasco on 13 September 1961, in Santiago, Chile.

== Career ==
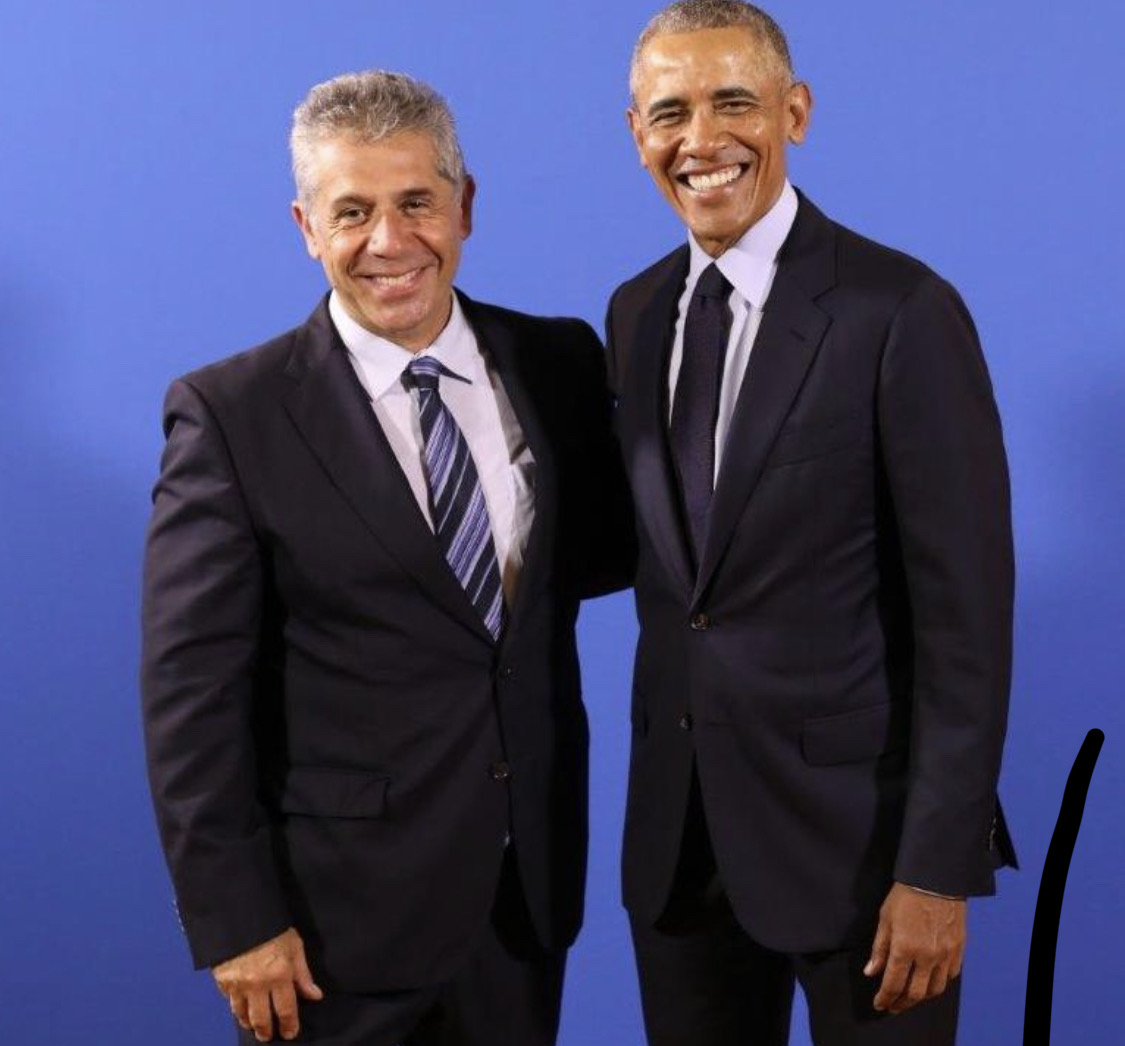

Pancho Campo is the founder of Chrand Events USA.

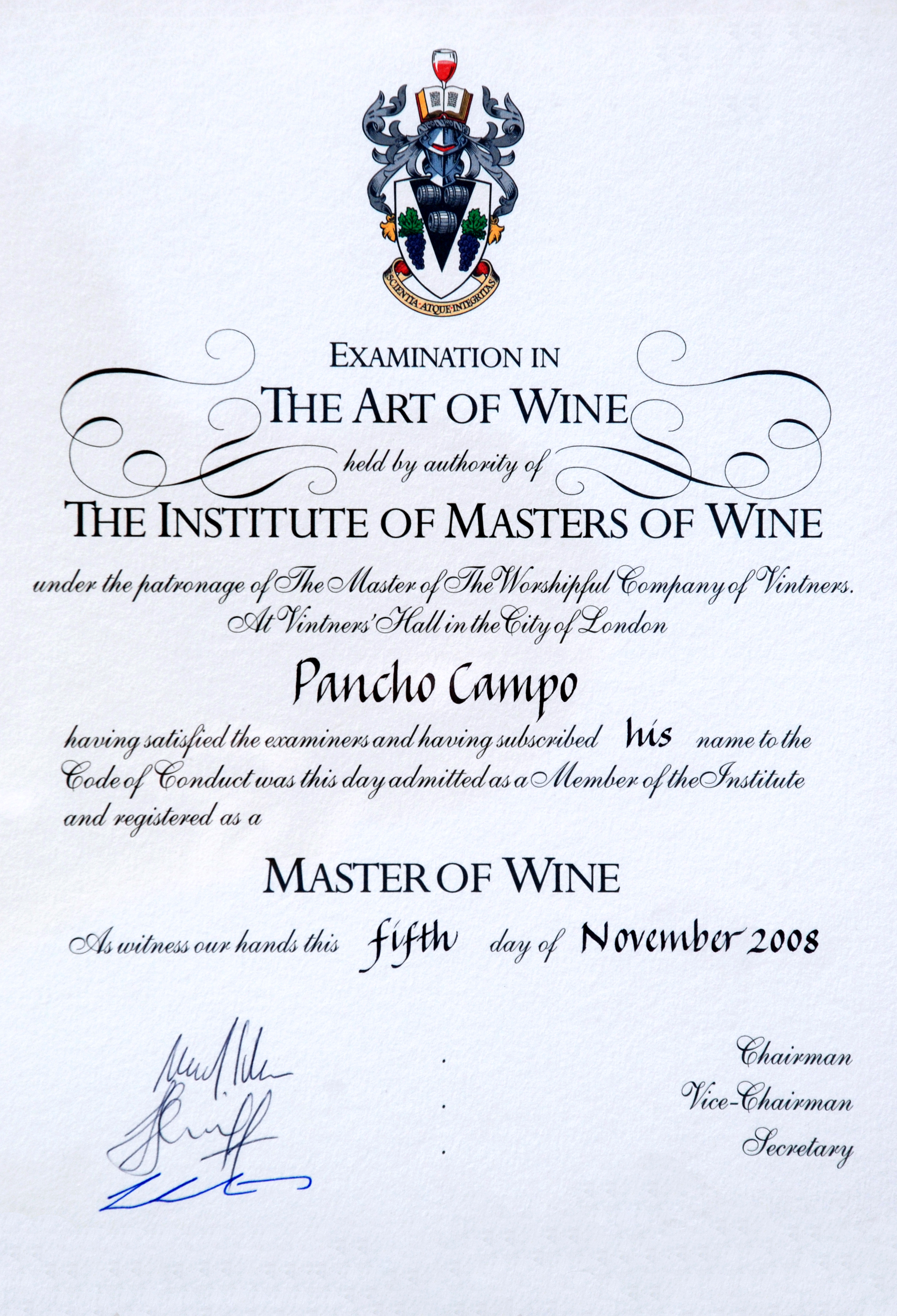

In 2005, Campo founded The Wine Academy of Spain and in 2008 became the first Spanish-speaking Master of Wine. In 2011, he faced an investigation by the Institute of Masters of Wine related to his collaboration with wine critic Robert Parker. He resigned from the institute in 2012.

In 2009, he initiated the Wine Future international congress, which has attracted prominent wine industry names and international leaders to discuss the economic crisis and its effects on the wine industry.

=== Interpol red notice ===
In 2009, Campo was refused entry to the United States for a business trip to Chicago, based on an Interpol red notice issued in 2005 by the United Arab Emirates, which requested Campo's arrest and extradition worldwide. After being refused entry, Campo was flown back to Europe and there released due to lack of corroborating evidence. Spain later refused extradition to the UAE. A year later, he was notified of having been tried in Dubai in absentia and sentenced. His business and family life suffered as a result, and he was barred from returning to the United States, resulting in the closure of his business interests there.

In February 2018, the red notice issued in 2005 by the UAE was vacated. According to Campo, the entire affair was a purely civil issue, resulting from allegedly unpaid rental car fees in the UAE that should never have resulted in a criminal complaint, nor in the notification to Interpol leading to refusal of entry to the U.S. and an arrest warrant. Campo's legal team considered bringing the case to the European Court of Human Rights to restore his reputation, and a demand for monetary damages.

== Personal life ==
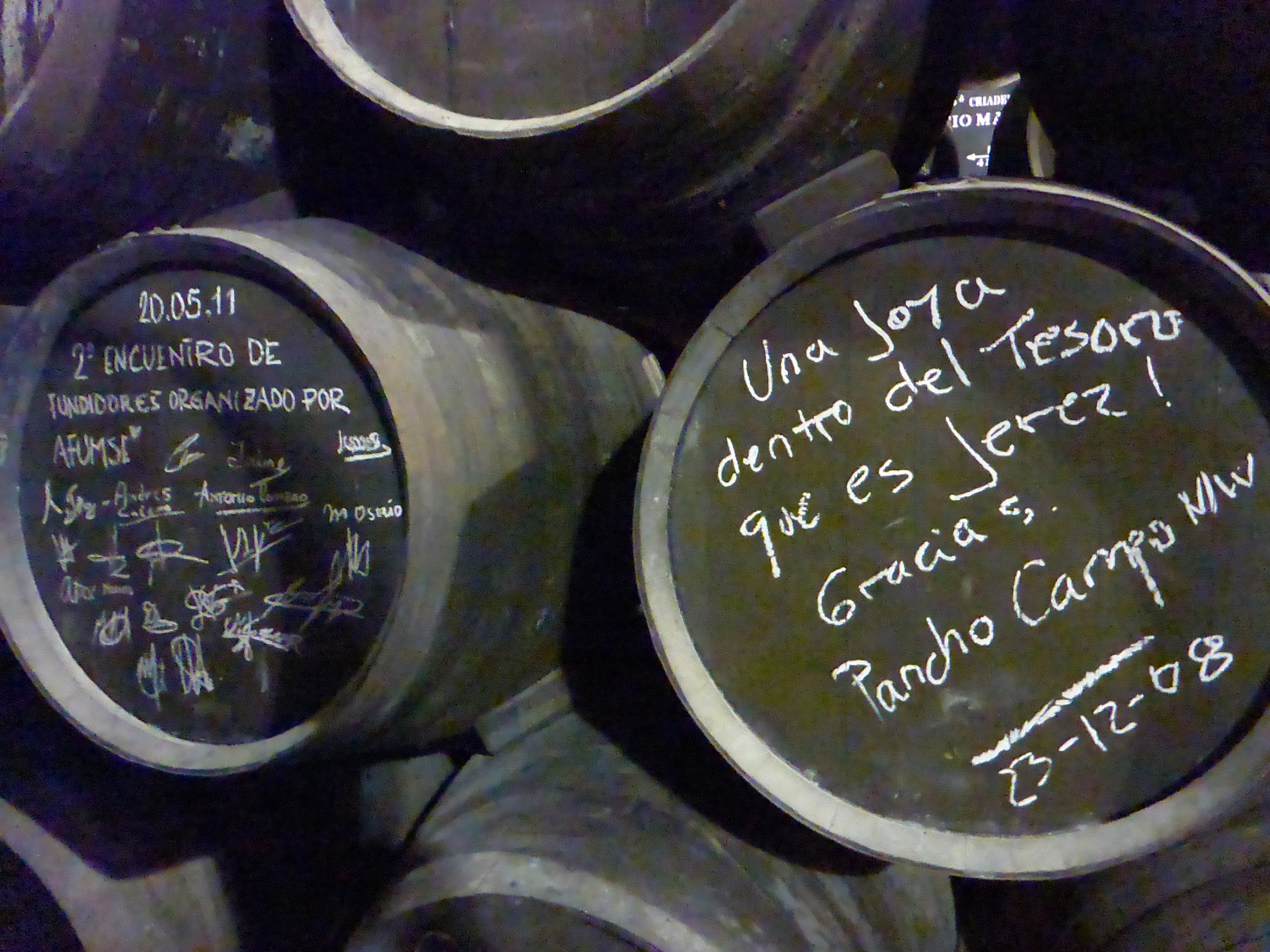
Signature in a Sherry barrel

Campo resides in Marbella, Spain with his wife and two children.
