= Campo Grande (Valladolid) =

Public park in Valladolid, Spain

Coordinates: 41°38′45″N 4°43′51″W

Map of Campo Grande with its most important parts: 1: Prince's Gate 2: Kids Games 3: Prince Paseo 4: Pergola with Fountain Swan. 5: Statue of Rosa chacel 6: Bust of Leopoldo Cano 7: Palomar 8: Floral shield of Valladolid and flag of Spain 9: Aviary 10: Statue of Miguel Iscar and Glorieta Book 11: Fountain of Fame 12: Faisanera and Fountain of the Frogs 13: Pond 14: Waterfall

The Campo Grande (English: "Large Field") is a large public park located in the heart of the city of Valladolid, Spain. It is triangular, has a 115,000 m² (11.5 ha) surface and is bordered by the streets Acera de Recoletos, Paseo de los Filipinos and Paseo de Zorrilla. Its main entrance is at Plaza de Zorrilla, where together with a modern bill gate lies a floral shield of the city. The park is enclosed around its perimeter by a simple fence that runs between pillars, with entrances on all sides.

Compared with the Retiro Park in Madrid, it is 10 times smaller in size (11.5 ha compared to 118), and almost 30 times smaller in size than Central Park in New York City (11.5 ha compared to 341).

Its origin as a park or, more specifically, as a garden area, dates back to 1787, although from the fifteenth century it was regarded as an important urban space. A notable feature of the park is the large and diverse birds. Spread over the surface lies a Faisanera, an aviary and a loft belonging to Castilla Pigeon Club, which have led to significant populations of peacocks, pheasants and pigeons. It also has a variety of trees that makes it a true botanical garden.

At various points in its history it was called the Field of Truth and then the Field of Mars, but it ultimately became known as Campo Grande.

== Gallery ==
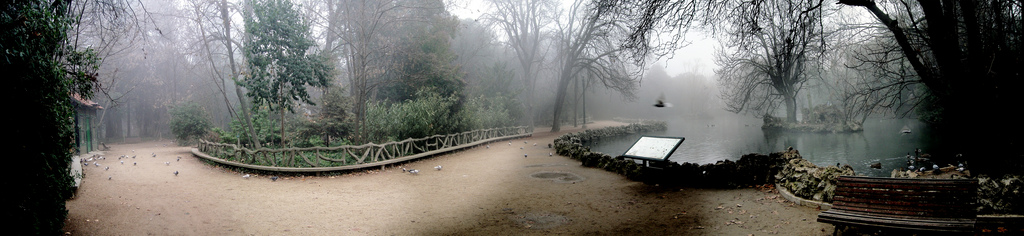
Panoramic view

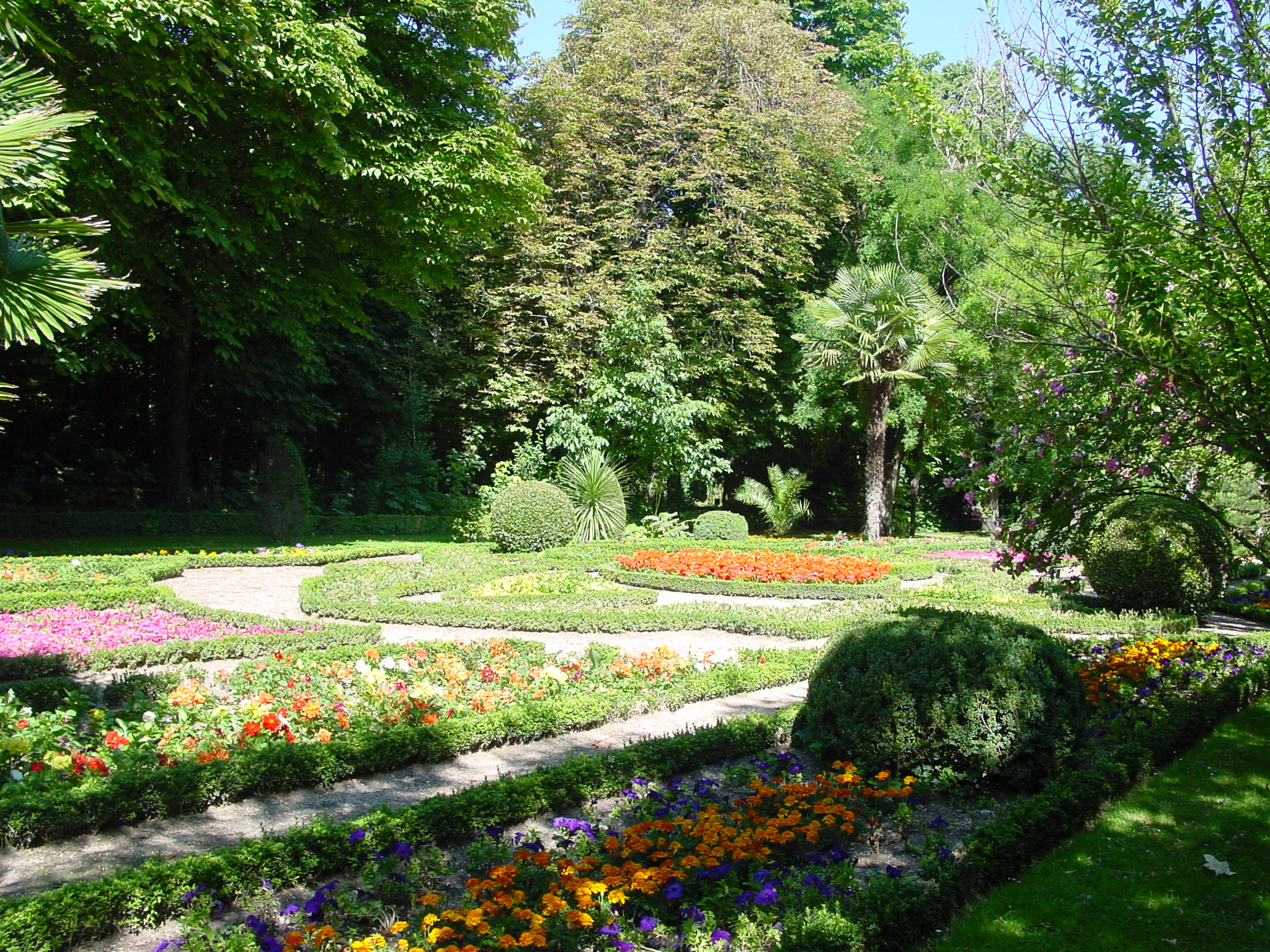

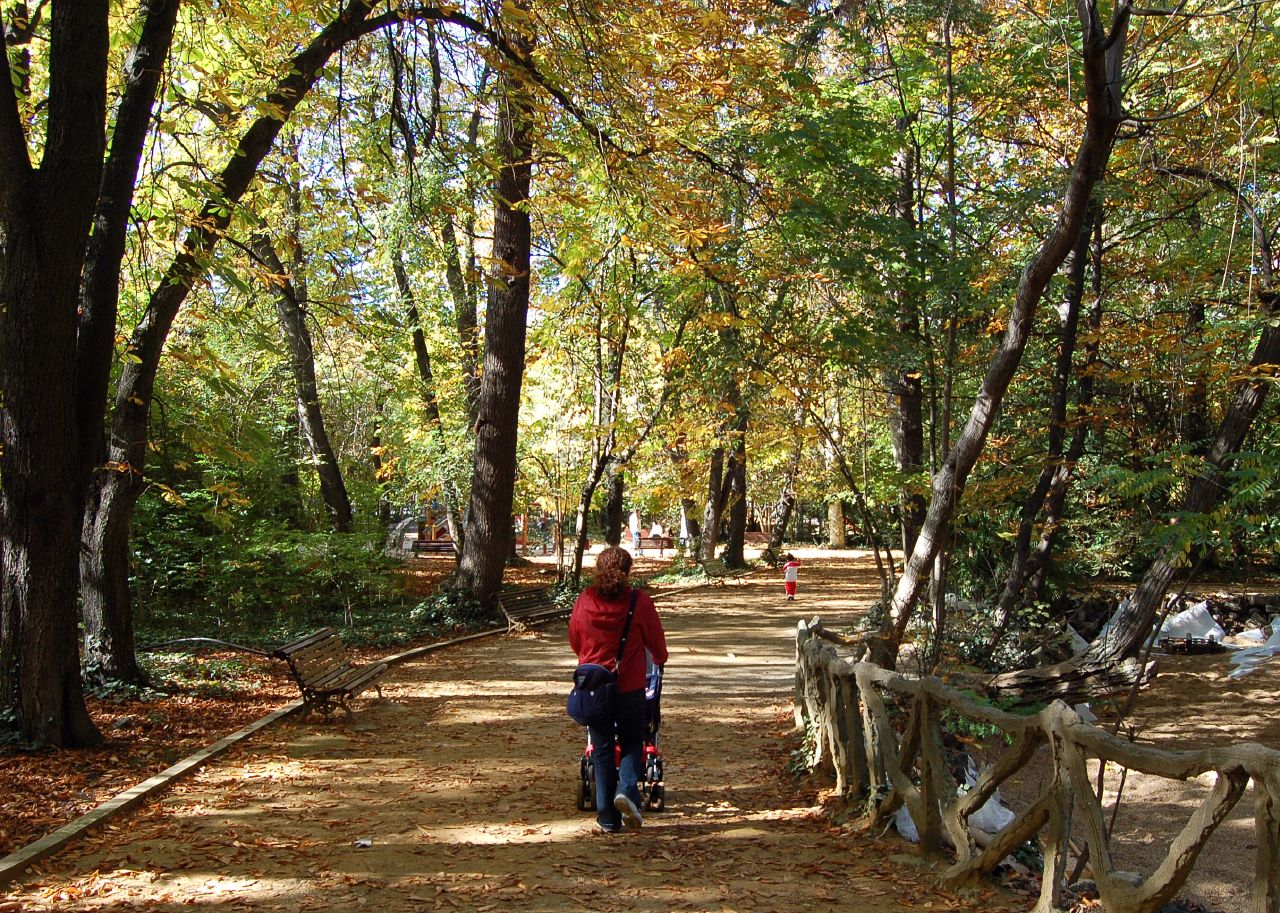

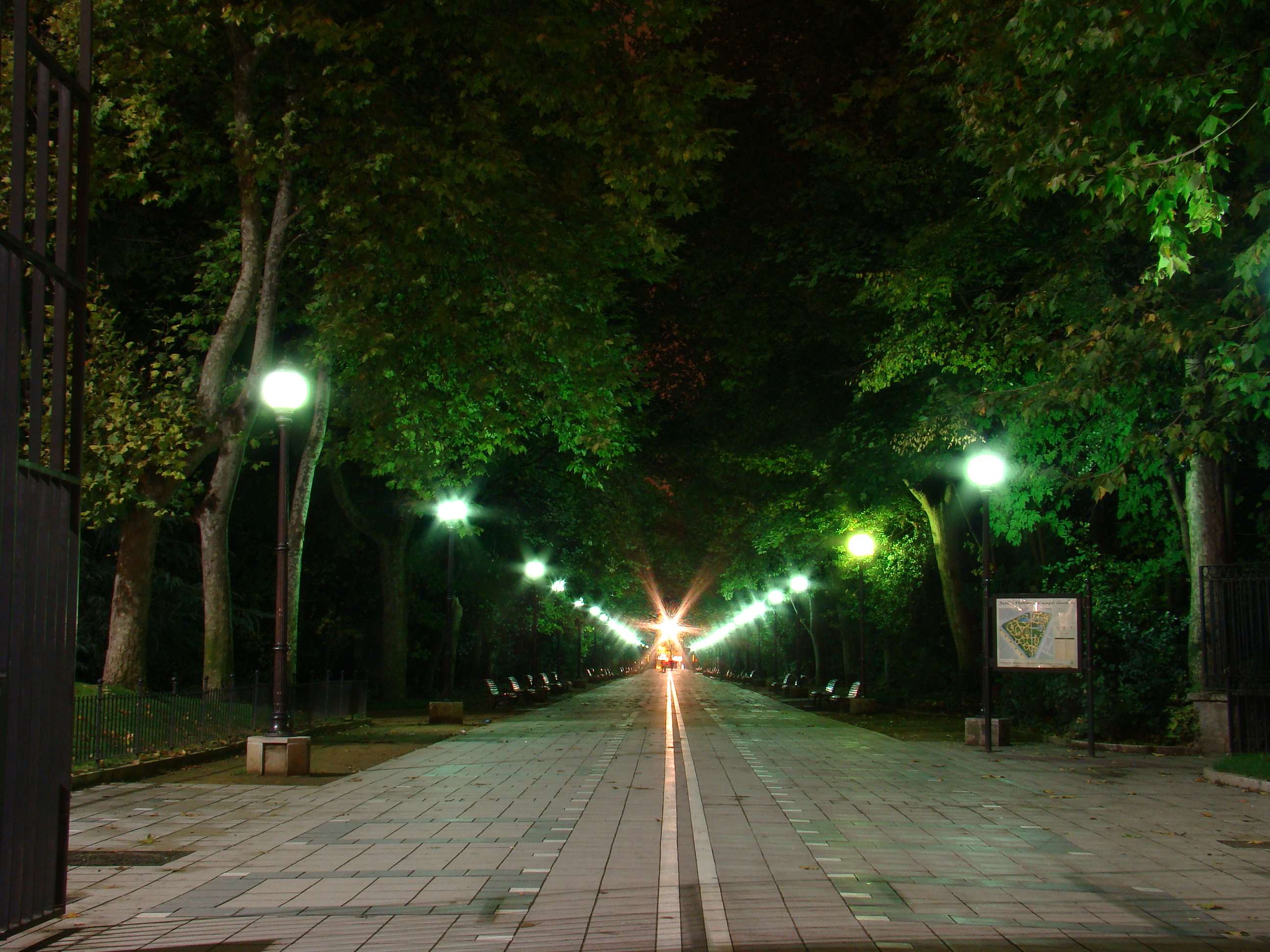

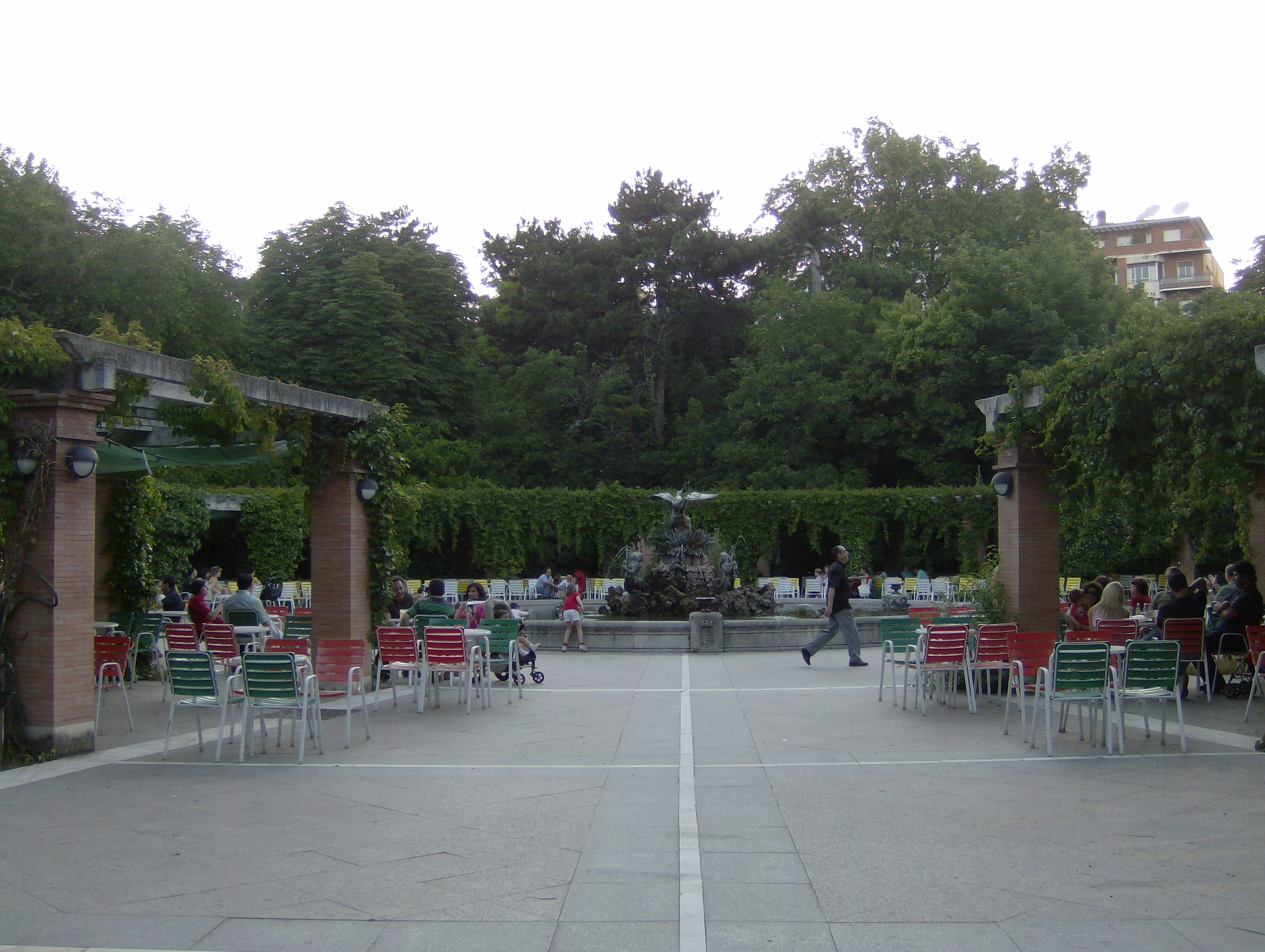

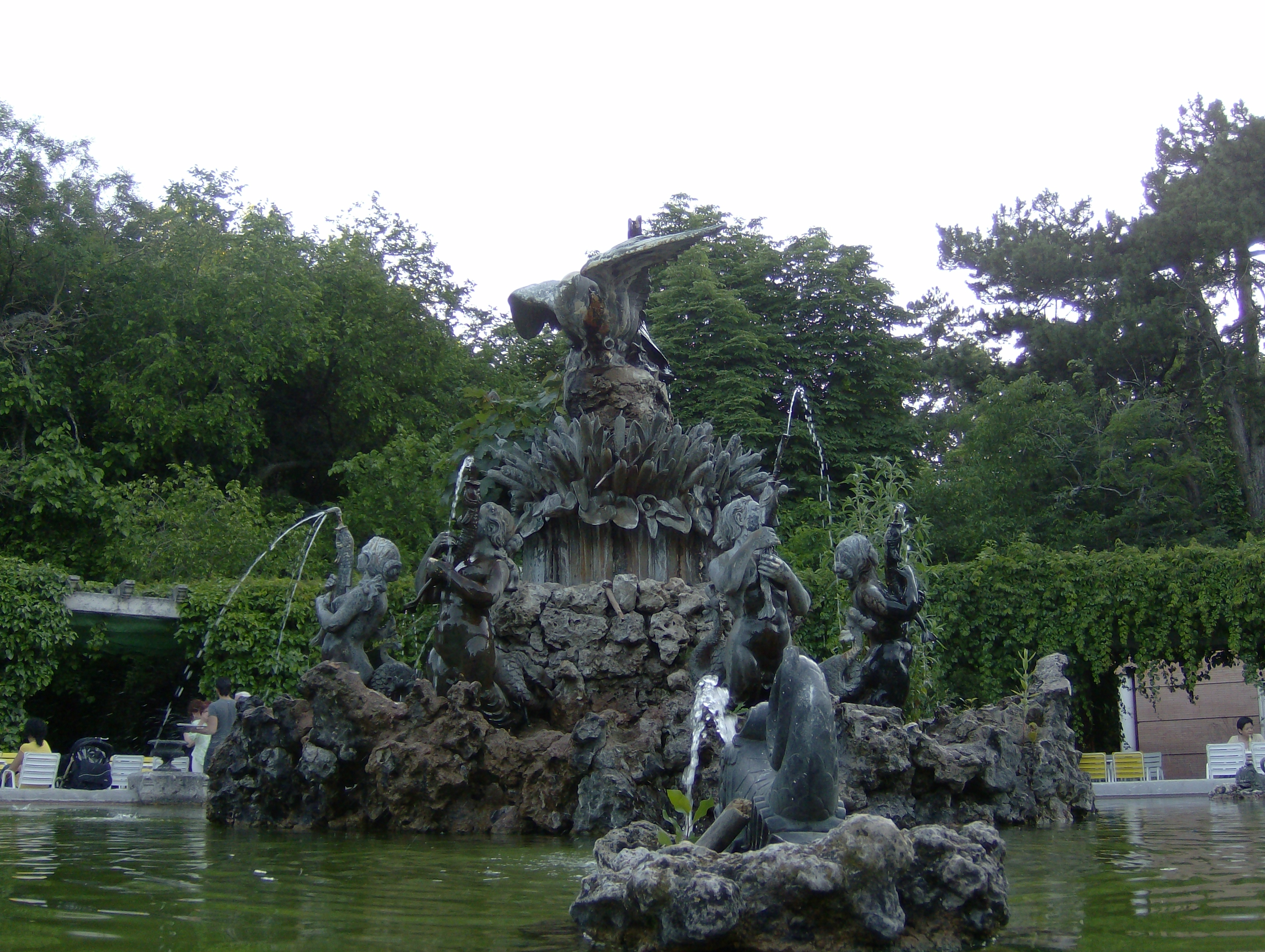

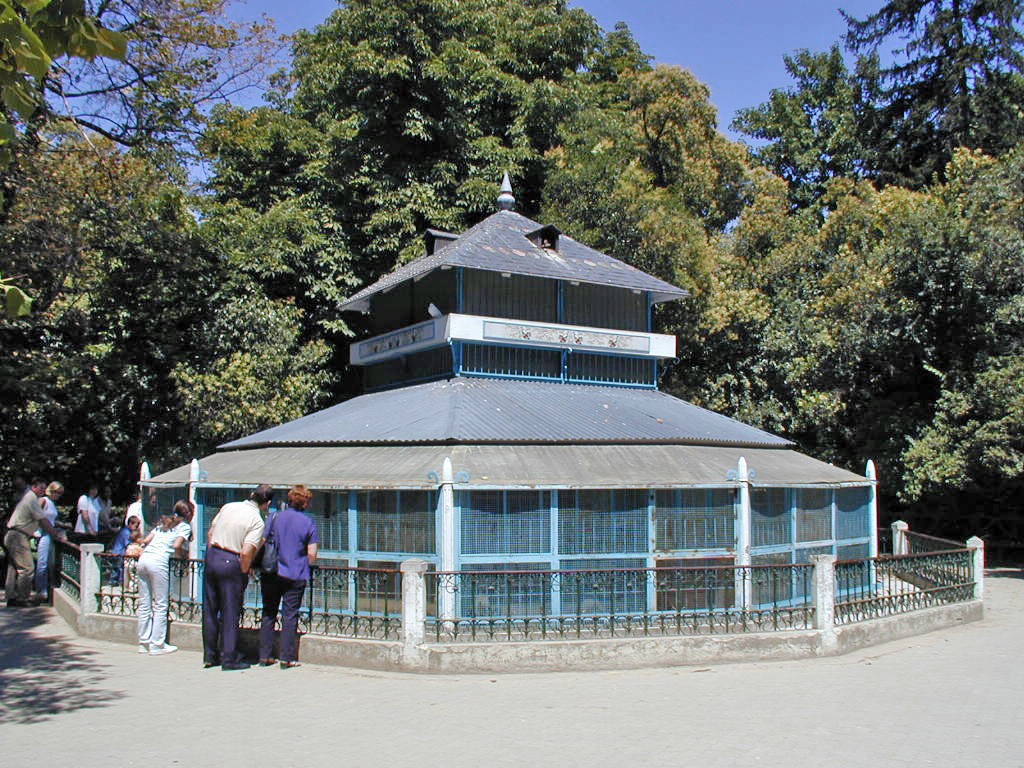
Aviary

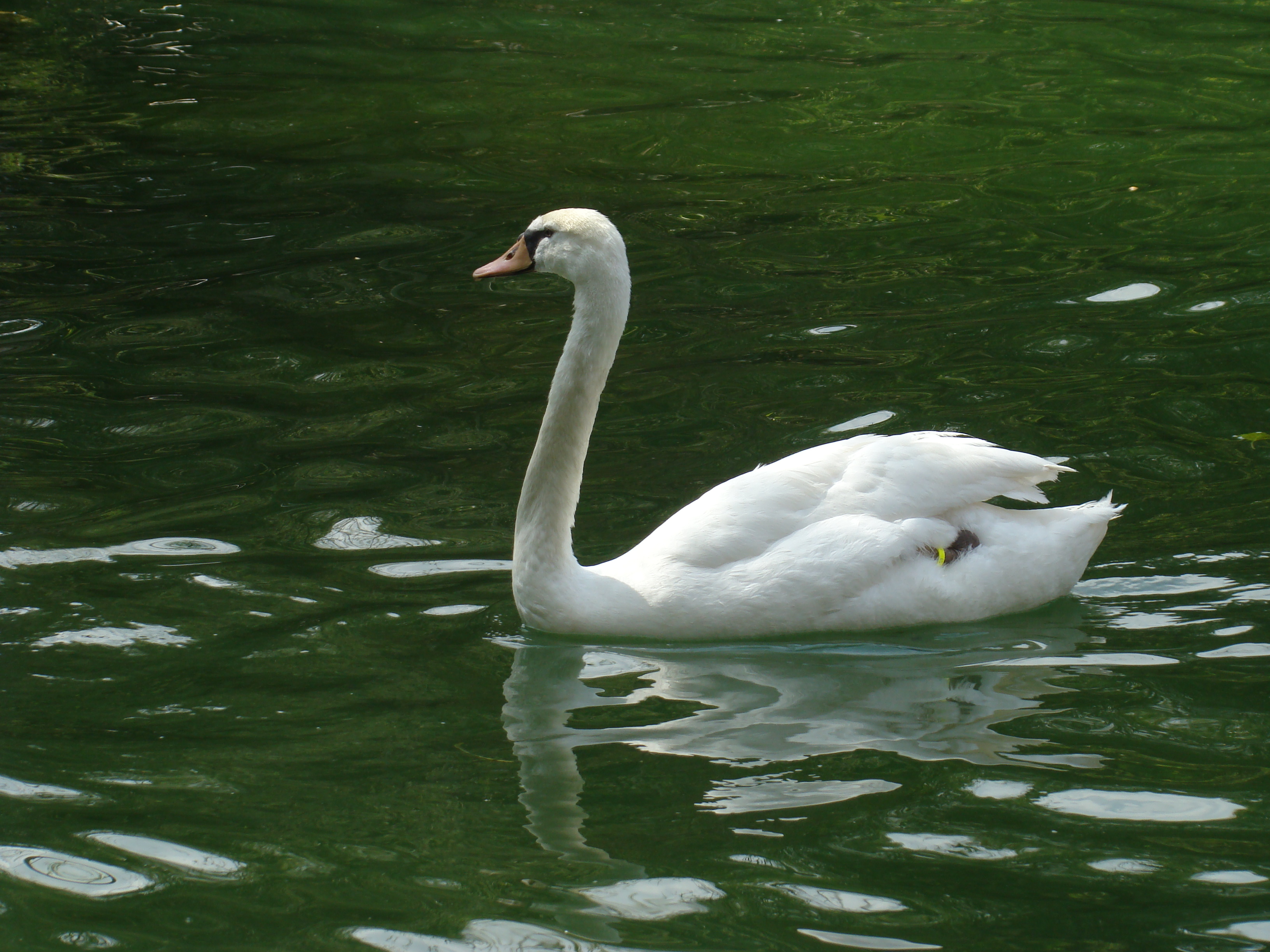
Mute swan

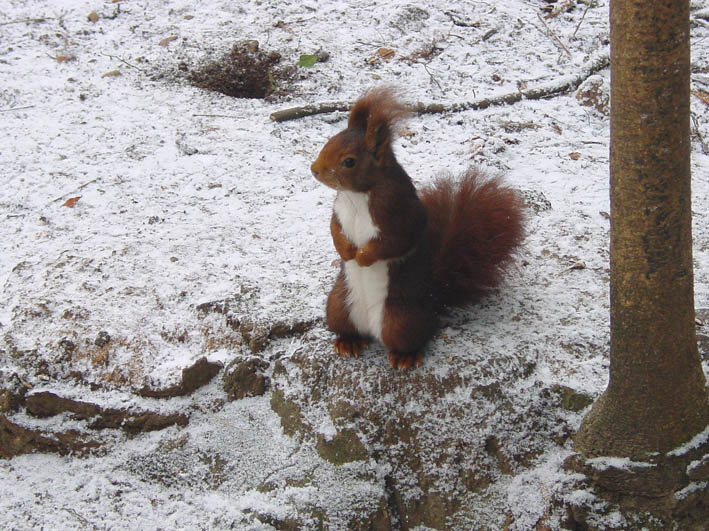
Red squirrel

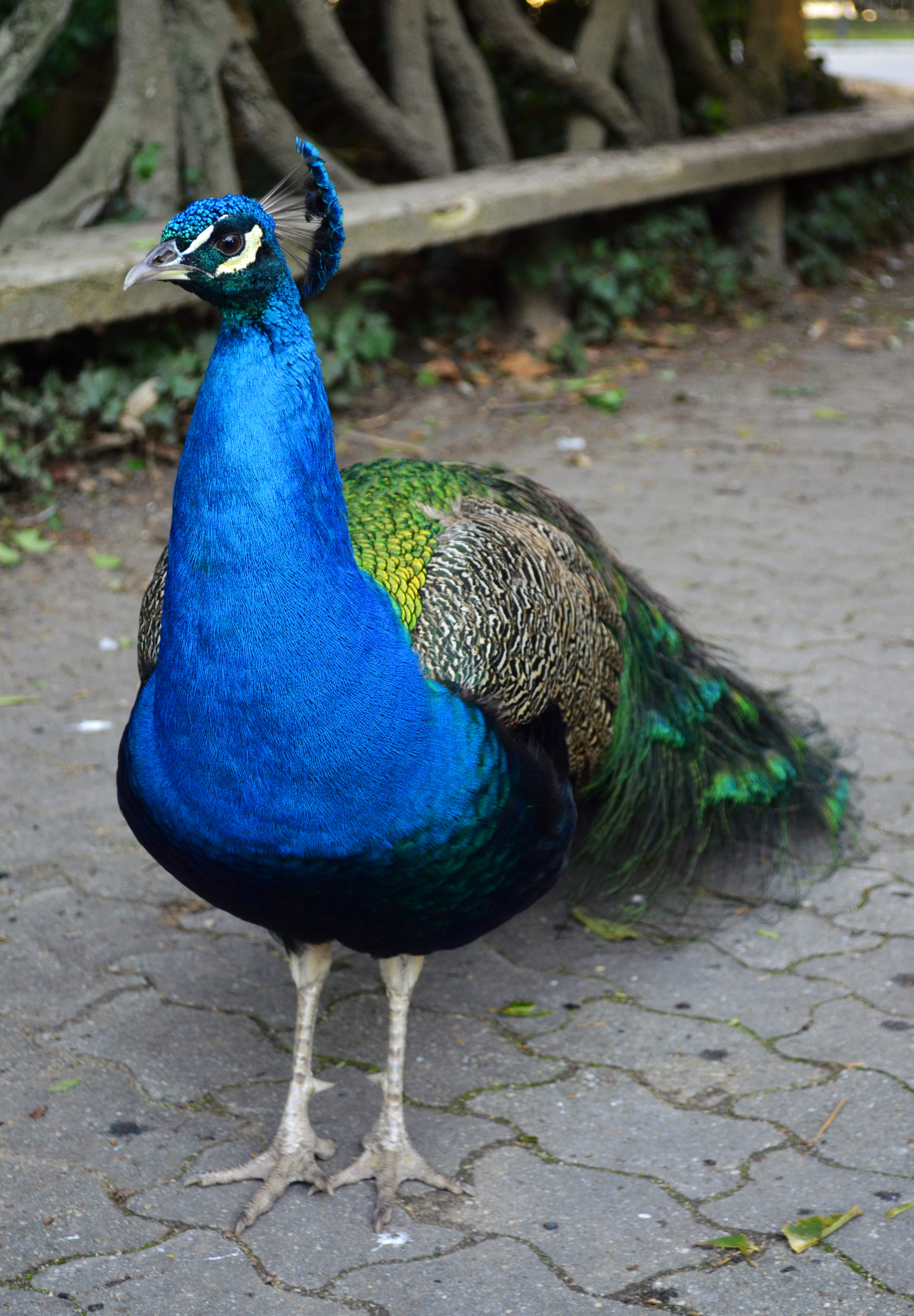
Indian Peafowl
