= Pier Paolo Campi =

Pier Paolo Campi (1668 – 1764) was an Italian Baroque sculptor.

He worked in Rome for the studio of Pierre Le Gros the Younger from 1703. His early works include: the Glory of the Angels, stucco, on the altar of San Salvatore in Lauro in Rome, St. Bonaventure - statue on the balustrade of the colonnade of St. Peter's Square in the Vatican and a marble sculpture of St. Sebastian for one of the altars of the church of Sant'Agnese in Piazza Navona, Rome.

In 1712, thanks to the recommendation of Pierre Le Gros, he received his first commission from the Benedictine monastery in Monte Cassino. He worked on commissions from the abbey for the next 23 years. The cooperation resulted in nine monumental sculptures of popes and abbey patrons. Most of those sculptures were destroyed during World War II; only the sculpture of St. Benedict partially survived.

Two of his late works can be seen in St. Peter's Basilica in Rome: St. Giulliana Falconieri (1732) and St. Pietro Nolasco (1742).

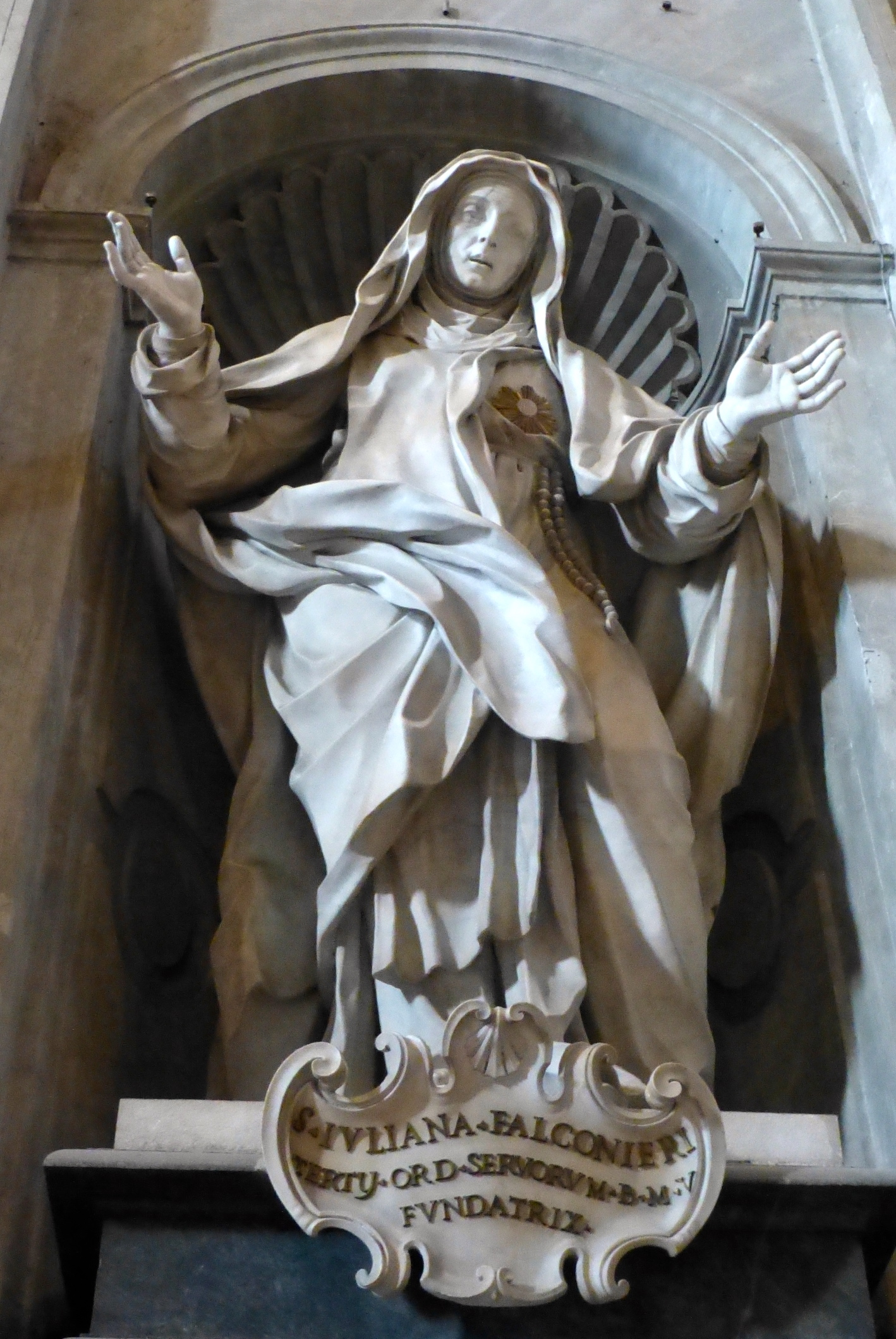
St. Juliana Falconieri, c. 1732, St. Peter's Basilica, Rome.

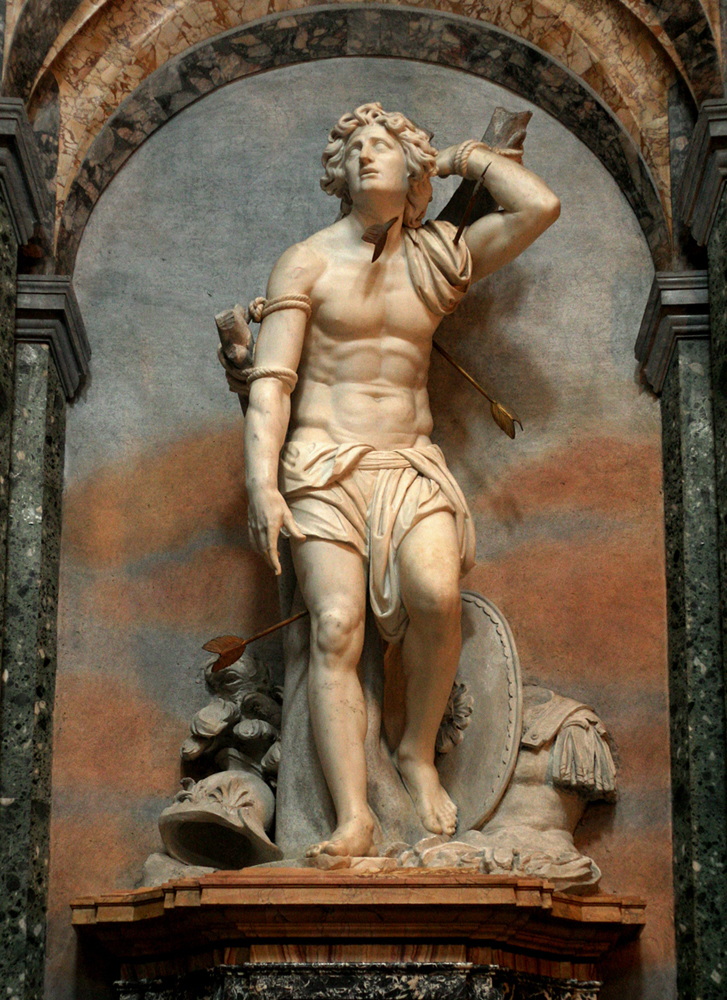
St. Sebastian, c. 1703, Sant'Agnese in Piazza Navona, Rome.
