= Deschamps =

Deschamps (French pronunciation: [deʃɑ̃], traditional English pronunciation: /ˈdɛʃən/ DESH-ən) is a common family name of French origin, which means "from the fields", from the French word champ = "field".

== People ==
=== Athletes ===
- Didier Deschamps (born 1968), French football player and manager
- Dylan Deschamps (born 2002), Canadian freestyle skier
- Maxime Deschamps (born 1991) Canadian skater
- Nicolas Deschamps (ice hockey), Canadian ice hockey player

=== Government officials ===
- Adolphe Deschamps (1807–1875), Belgian statesman and publisher
- Carlos Romero Deschamps (1944–2023), Mexican politician
- Johanne Deschamps (born 1959), Canadian politician
- Marie Deschamps (born 1952), Canadian jurist
- Noël Deschamps (1908–2005), Australian diplomat
- Robert Deschamps (born 1940), Canadian politician

=== Religious figures ===
- Gérard-Joseph Deschamps (1929–2022), Canadian Roman Catholic prelate
- Léger Marie Deschamps (1716–1774), French philosopher and Benedictine monk
- Nicolas Deschamps (writer) (1797–1872), French Jesuit and writer
- Victor-Auguste-Isidor Deschamps (1810–1883), Belgian cardinal and archbishop

=== Writers ===
- Émile Deschamps (1791–1871), French poet
- Eustache Deschamps (1328–1415), French poet
- François-Michel-Chrétien Deschamps (1683–1747), French playwright
- Gaston Deschamps (1861–1931), French archaeologist and writer
- Yvon Deschamps (born 1935), Canadian author and humorist

=== Other ===
- Benjamin Deschamps, Canadian saxophonist
- Christine Deschamps, French librarian
- Eric Deschamps (born 1975), American artist
- Fernand Deschamps (1868–1957), Belgian intellectual
- Georges A. Deschamps (1911–1998), French-American electrical engineer
- Gérard Deschamps (born 1937), French artist
- Hubert Deschamps (1923–1998), French actor, uncle of Jérôme
- Jean Deschamps (academic) (1925-1998), French academic
- Jean Deschamps (actor) (1920-2007), French architect and director
- Jean Deschamps (architect), 13th century French architect
- Jérôme Deschamps (born 1947), French actor, director and opera manager
- Louis Auguste Deschamps (1765–1842), French botanist and surgeon
- Maison Des Champs (born 2000), American anti-abortion activist
- Paul Deschamps (1888–1974), French medievalist, father of Hubert

== See also ==
- Decamps
- Van der Velden, Dutch counterpart
