= Van Velde =

van Velde is a surname. Notable people with the surname include:

- Bram van Velde (1895–1981), Dutch painter
- Geer van Velde (1898–1977), Dutch painter
- Gerard van Velde (born 1971), Dutch speed skater
- Jacoba van Velde (1903–1985), Dutch writer

== See also ==
- Van de Velde
