= Swaine =

Swaine is both a surname and a given name. Notable people with the name include:

== People with the surname ==
- Aisling Swaine, Irish academic in International Affairs
- Ann Swaine (<1821–1883), British writer and suffragist
- Francis Swaine (1725–1782), British marine painter, father of Monamy
- John Swaine (1775–1860), English engraver
- John Joseph Swaine (1932–2012), President of the Legislative Council of Hong Kong
- Leopold Swaine (1840–1931), British officer
- Michael Swaine (technical author), American author
- Michael D. Swaine, American expert in China security studies
- Monamy Swaine (c.1750-c.1800), British artist, son of Francis
- Robert Swaine (d. 1705), first owner of Leverington Hall in Cambridgeshire

== People with the given name ==
- Alfred Swaine Taylor (1806–1880), English toxicologist and medical writer
- Dorothy Swaine Thomas (1899–1977), American sociologist and economist
- Francis Swaine Muhlenberg (1795–1831), German-American politician

== See also ==
- Swain (disambiguation)
- Swaine London
