= In 't Veld =

In 't Veld is a Dutch toponymic surname meaning "in the field". Variations are In 't Veldt, In het Veld and the contraction Intveld. More common Dutch surnames with a similar meaning are Van de Velde, Van der Velde and Van der Velden ("from the fields"). Notable people with the name include:

- André in het Veld (born 1958), Dutch former freestyle swimmer
- Bart Spring in 't Veld (born 1976), Dutch television producer
- James Intveld (born 1959), Dutch-born American rockabilly singer-songwriter
- Jan in 't Veld (1925–2005), Dutch aerospace engineer and professor of industrial organization
- Joris in 't Veld (1885–1981), Dutch Social Democratic politician, minister, professor at the Leiden University
- Roel in 't Veld (born 1942), Dutch public administration scholar and Labour Party politician
- Sophie in 't Veld (born 1963), Dutch Member of the European Parliament

== See also ==
- Veldt (surname)
