= Veldt (disambiguation) =

Veldt, or veld, is open rural landscape (grassland, shrubland) in southern Africa.

Veldt may also refer to:

- "The Veldt" (short story), a science fiction story by Ray Bradbury
  - The Veldt (film), a 1987 Soviet film based on the story by Ray Bradbury
  - "The Veldt" (song), a song by Deadmau5, also based on the Bradbury story
- The Veldt (band), an American alternative group
- Veldt Township, Marshall County, Minnesota
- VELD Music Festival, a festival named after the song

== Surname ==
Veldt, Veld and Veldsman may also refer to:

- Lau Veldt (born 1953), Dutch track cyclist
- Tim Veldt (born 1984), Dutch track cyclist
- Piet Veldsman (born 1952), former South African rugby union player

== See also ==
- in 't Veld
