= Decamps =

Decamps is a French surname. Notable people with the surname include:

- Alexandre-Gabriel Decamps (1803–1860), French painter
- Derek Decamps (born 1985), French footballer
- Gabriel Decamps (born 1999), Brazilian tennis player
- Henri Décamps (born 1935), French biologist
- Jose DeCamps, Dominican-American dancer
- Kit DeCamps (1878–1951), American soldier, engineer, and football player
- Paul Decamps (1884–1915), French rugby union player

== See also ==
- DeCamps Island, island in New York state
- Roullet & Decamps, a defunct French toy company
- Deschamps
