= Peter Monamy =

English painter

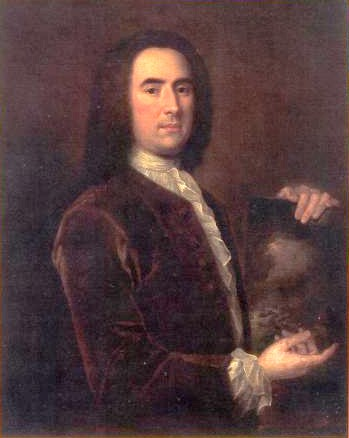
- c. 1730 portrait of Monamy by Thomas Stubley
- Born: 1681; London, England
- Died: 7 February 1749 (aged 68); London, England
- Movement: Marine art

Peter Monamy (1681 – 7 February 1749) was an English painter who specialised in marine art.

== Early life and family ==
Peter Monamy was baptised at the church of St Botolph's-without-Aldgate, London, England, on 12 January 1681 (new style). His name seems to be of French origin, and it is probable that he was of French descent. He was the last of the five known children, all born in London, of Pierre, or Peter, Monamy, born circa 1650 in Guernsey, and his English wife, Dorothy Gilbert; and the grandson of André Monamy, 1612–1680, who had been a strongly committed Commonwealth Parliamentarian, and one of Guernsey's Governors, during the 1650s. Dorothy Gilbert, born 1660 in London, was the daughter of James Gilbert, who had been Master of the Worshipful Company of Gunmakers in 1670 and 1672. A marriage allegation, dated 22 October 1675, records the union of Peter Mon-Amy, of St Martin's in the Fields, and Dorothy Gilbert, of St Trinity in the Minory, with her father's consent, at All Hallowes in the Wall, London. Peter (Pierre) Mon-Amy's age is given as "abt 23", and Dorothy Gilbert's age as "abt 18". Their actual ages appear to have been 25 and 15.

The Monamy family had been prominent merchants and residents of Guernsey since the 1560s, and in the Channel Islands since at least the 1530s. The painter's father, Pierre, who appears to have died in about 1685, had a brother named André, or Andrew, who was active in London as a merchant trader in salt and wool, during the late 17th and early 18th centuries. In December, 1696, Andrew Monamy, together with his cousin, Daniel Le Febvre, is described as "guardian" of the children of Peter (Pierre) Monamy, deceased. Andrew Monamy is also named in Admiralty archival records as having served as boatswain in 1710 on a 20 gun privateer named "La Chasse", owned by a syndicate of Guernsey merchants. Later in the same year Andrew is recorded as lieutenant on another privateer owned by Daniel Lefebvre and Andrew Mesurier of Guernsey. The gunner on this vessel, named "The Revenge of the Flying Sloop", was an Andrew Clark.

On 3 September 1696, Peter Monamy, aged 15, was bound as an apprentice for seven years by indenture to William Clark, a former (1687) Master of the Worshipful Company of Painter-Stainers, one of London's ancient guilds of craftsmen. Clark is recorded in several capacities in the London of the late 17th century, as a constable and juryman, with premises in Thames Street, and on London Bridge, and practised as what would today be called an interior decorator, with a thriving business. House decoration comprised a wide range of activities, including the provision of paintings as overdoors and overmantels, and on panelling, house murals on canvas as well as decorative sign-boards for trade establishments. William Clark died before January, 1704, when his will was proved.

Monamy was made free of his apprenticeship on 1 March 1704 (new style), the same day as James Thornhill, a fellow Painter-Stainer, who later became the first native English painter to be knighted, and whose major work is the decoration of the Painted Hall of the Greenwich Naval Hospital, celebrating English naval prowess and the Protestant monarchy.

In Wine and Walnuts, William Henry Pyne mentions that Monamy served his apprenticeship on London Bridge, and that he exhibited his works in the window of his shop. There is no indication that Monamy worked for anyone other than his master, William Clark, and the very strong likelihood is that he succeeded to Clark's practice at his death, and continued in the same business. This supposition is reinforced by the birth and baptism of his first child at St Olave's Church, Southwark in the vicinity of the south end of London Bridge.

On 17 April 1706, a daughter of Peter Monamy, painter, and Margaret, is recorded as baptised with the name of Margaret, at St Olave's, near London Bridge, on the south bank of the Thames. The child's death is registered on 7 May, and it must be assumed that her mother also died. On 9 January 1707 (new style), Peter Monamy is recorded as marrying Hannah Christopher, at Allhallows, London Wall.

Three children were born to Peter and Hannah Monamy in rapid succession: Andrew, baptised on 15 December 1708, at St Botolph's; Hannah, baptised on 5 March 1710, at St Mary's, Whitechapel; and another Andrew, baptised on 11 August 1712, also at St Mary's. As there is no further record of these children it must be assumed that all three died young, or in infancy. In 1708 the baptismal register records the couple, or the mother, as living in the Minories, near St Botolph's; and in 1712 in Red Lion Street, near St Mary's. The Minories was an area noted for its gunsmiths.

On 6 October 1708, Monamy registered an apprentice, Henry Kirby, who was bound to him for seven years by indenture. Kirby was the son of Henry Kirby, citizen and gunmaker of London, and a member of the Company of Gunmakers.

A further child, named Robert, is recorded as born to Peter and Hannah on 12 May 1720, and registered at St Saviour's, Southwark, Surrey. This suggests that Peter had returned to live on London Bridge, having previously had an interim London address in Red Lion Street. There is no further known record of this child.

== Missing years ==
The next confirmed biographical item comes from the Westminster Poor Rate Book, which lists "Peter Monyman" as living in Fish Yard, off St Margaret's Lane, from 1723 to 1729. Fish Yard was almost within the precincts of Westminster Hall, the seat of government, very close to Westminster Abbey, and St. Margaret's, Westminster, which is still the parish church of the House of Commons. A daughter, Anne, of Peter and Hannah Monamy, was baptised at St Margaret's, Westminster, on 3 September 1725.

At present it can only be conjectured what Monamy's whereabouts may have been during the years between about 1714 and 1720. It is not impossible, however, that he spent some time in Cork, Ireland, which at this time was a hive of activity for English, and particularly Huguenot, craftsmen. There are two notable paintings by Monamy depicting yachts of the Royal Cork Yacht Club, which are still owned by the club. Charles Brooking, father of the highly regarded marine painter, also named Charles (1723–1759), has left a record of his presence in Ireland; and William van der Hagen, another painter-decorator, and occasional marine painter, is also associated with the city of Cork. Another possibility is of a period of residence in Plymouth, where Charles Brooking Senior was involved in furbishing Rudyard's Eddystone Lighthouse. There is a striking painting of Henry Winstanley's earlier Eddystone lighthouse by Peter Monamy, now in the Plymouth Museum. A second painting of Winstanley's lighthouse, as well as one of Rudyard's, both by Monamy, are also known. During these years it may reasonably be conjectured that another daughter, Mary, would have been born to Peter and Hannah. There is no known record of her birth in London, but she later married Francis Swaine, on 26 June 1749, at Allhallows, London Wall.

From the above records, and subsequent comments, it can reasonably be surmised, as mentioned above, that Monamy set up in business on his own account, both as a decorator and easel painter, quite soon after being made free in 1704. He is repeatedly mentioned in later accounts as having owned a shop on London Bridge. William Henry Pyne, an artist and raconteur (1769–1843) mentions that "Monamy, the marine painter, some of whose pictures were scarcely inferior to Vandevelde's, served his apprenticeship on London Bridge, and exhibited his works in the window of his shop, to the delight of the sons of Neptune, men and boys, who were seen in crowds gazing at his wondrous art."

== Later life ==
An English Fleet Coming to Anchor

On taking up residence as a studio painter, in Westminster in the early 1720s, Monamy's practice to all appearances entered a new and prosperous phase. His standing as a Liveryman of the Painter-Stainer's Company in 1726 was cemented by the donation to Painter's Hall of what was subsequently described by Thomas Pennant as "a fine piece of shipping", which is still in situ. Five large paintings, one dated 1725, were produced for George Byng, 1st Viscount Torrington, (1663–1733) First Lord of the Admiralty from 1727, commemorating his naval triumphs. In Southill: A Regency House, 1951, Sir Oliver Millar mentions that three of these paintings are signed, that they are executed "in a very cartographic manner", and "are of considerable historical interest". While establishing himself as London's pre-eminent marine painter, Monamy will have continued to undertake commissions as a house decorator. There is extant a marine overmantel firmly attributable to him in a house in Old Burlington Street, near Bond Street, London, which is datable to 1728.

During the decade from 1730 to 1740 Monamy would have found that his practice became increasingly hard-pressed, as it met with the censure of groups of self-appointed arbiters of taste, and the importation of quantities of Old Master paintings from Italy and France, as well as of artists and aesthetic concepts from the continent. These were sufficiently detrimental to native English practitioners to drive William Hogarth, Monamy's close contemporary, to expressions of near-fury.

Hogarth is credited with hitting upon the idea of using the re-opening in 1736 of Vauxhall Gardens, a pleasure resort for Londoners, as a show-place for native English paintings. Monamy supplied at least four prominently displayed naval scenes for the Gardens. These are now lost, but known from engravings. In a review for the "Times Literary Supplement", 27 January 2012, of Coke and Borg's "Vauxhall Gardens", John Barrell points out that "a national art in the making was reinforced by a number of modern history paintings by Peter Monamy, of English naval victories". Two of these paintings (the Algerine Pirates and Sweet William's Farewell, both engraved by Paul Fourdrinier, who since about 1900 has also been mistakenly referred to as Peter, or Pierre, Fourdrinier) appear to have been on display prior to the war with Spain, which began in 1739. A substantial number of prints, in mezzotint and line, after Monamy's works, were produced in the years from about 1730 until just before his death in 1749. These continued to be reproduced and copied, in some quantity, until well into the 19th century. Those engravings executed during Monamy's lifetime are an excellent guide to the genuine manner of his oeuvre.

During his final years a significant number of Monamy's paintings can be closely associated with the naval exploits of several English fleet officer members of the Durell family of Jersey, and the de Sausmarez family of Guernsey, who were themselves linked by multiple marriage ties. In the period preceding Britain's crucial first bid for global naval supremacy, at Porto Bello in 1740, and during the mounting opposition to the appeasement policies and other political measures of Robert Walpole, England's long-serving Prime Minister, these sea-captains were among the most active and vociferous of his opponents. Monamy painted numerous versions of Admiral Vernon's capture of Porto Bello, including a canvas for public display at Vauxhall Gardens. It was reported in The Daily Post, a London newspaper, of Tuesday, 20 May 1740, that the Prince of Wales and Princess Augusta had selected "the Picture representing the taking of Porto Bello" for particular inspection during a visit to the Gardens the previous evening. Frederick, Prince of Wales, 1707–1751, was at that time publicly heading the political opposition to Robert Walpole.

Monamy continued as the marine painter most esteemed by active serving seamen, even during his slow financial decline and loss of aristocratic patronage, and for many decades after his death. In 1749 George Vertue expressed this reputation: "his industry and understanding in the forms and buildings of shipping with all the tackles ropes and sails etc. which he thoroughly understood made his paintings of greater value; besides his neatness and clean pencilling of sky and water by many was much esteemed, especially sea-faring people, officers, and other merchants." Joseph Highmore noted, in 1766, that "a sailor … is a better judge of the principal circumstances which enter into the composition of a sea-piece, than the best painter in the world, who was never at sea." Monamy was buried in St Margaret's Church on 7 February 1749.

These "indifferent circumstances", which only apply to his last two or three years, have been over-stressed in many later accounts of Monamy's life. Well over a year after his death, on 26 July 1750, his studio possessions, pictures, prints, drawings, ship models, furniture and collection of china were auctioned, the sale lasting a full day. His house, which he must have moved into from Fish Yard some time after 1730, was described in the auctioneer's advertisement as "next to King Henry VII Chapel in Old Palace Yard", at the east end of Westminster Abbey. The building is noticeable in an engraving of the Abbey by Samuel Wale included in Volume 1 of Robert Dodsley's London and its Environs Described, 1761. However, it is clear that Monamy's two daughters, Mary and Ann, and more particularly his widow, were left in financial difficulties.

Ann Monamy had married Thomas Cornwall, an apothecary, on 14 February 1745, at St George's Chapel, Mayfair, and their eldest son, Peter Monamy Cornwall, was baptised on 20 January 1747, at St Margaret's, Westminster. Four months after Peter Monamy's death Mary Monamy married Francis Swaine, 1725–1782, on 29 June 1749, at All Hallows-on-the-Wall. Their second child, and only known son, was baptised Monamy Swaine on 27 February 1753, at St Dunstan's, Stepney. Monamy Swaine followed his father and grandfather as a marine painter.

The range of Monamy's painting œuvre is remarkably wide and varied, and it is apparent that in his prime he must have headed a considerable studio, and that a number of younger and older assistants would have participated in studio productions during his 45-year career. It is very possible that Charles Brooking was one of these, during the 1740s. Francis Swaine, who became a highly regarded marine painter from about 1758 onwards, is explicitly referred to as "Old Swaine, pupil of Monamy", in a memoir of Admiral Sir George Young, who had taken part in the second Capture of Louisbourg, Nova Scotia, 1758. In Mark Noble's Biographical History of England, 1806, under the entry for Monamy, it is stated that "Swaine, of Stretton Ground, Westminster, his disciple, and bred under him, was an excellent painter of moon-light pieces."

== Posthumous reputation ==
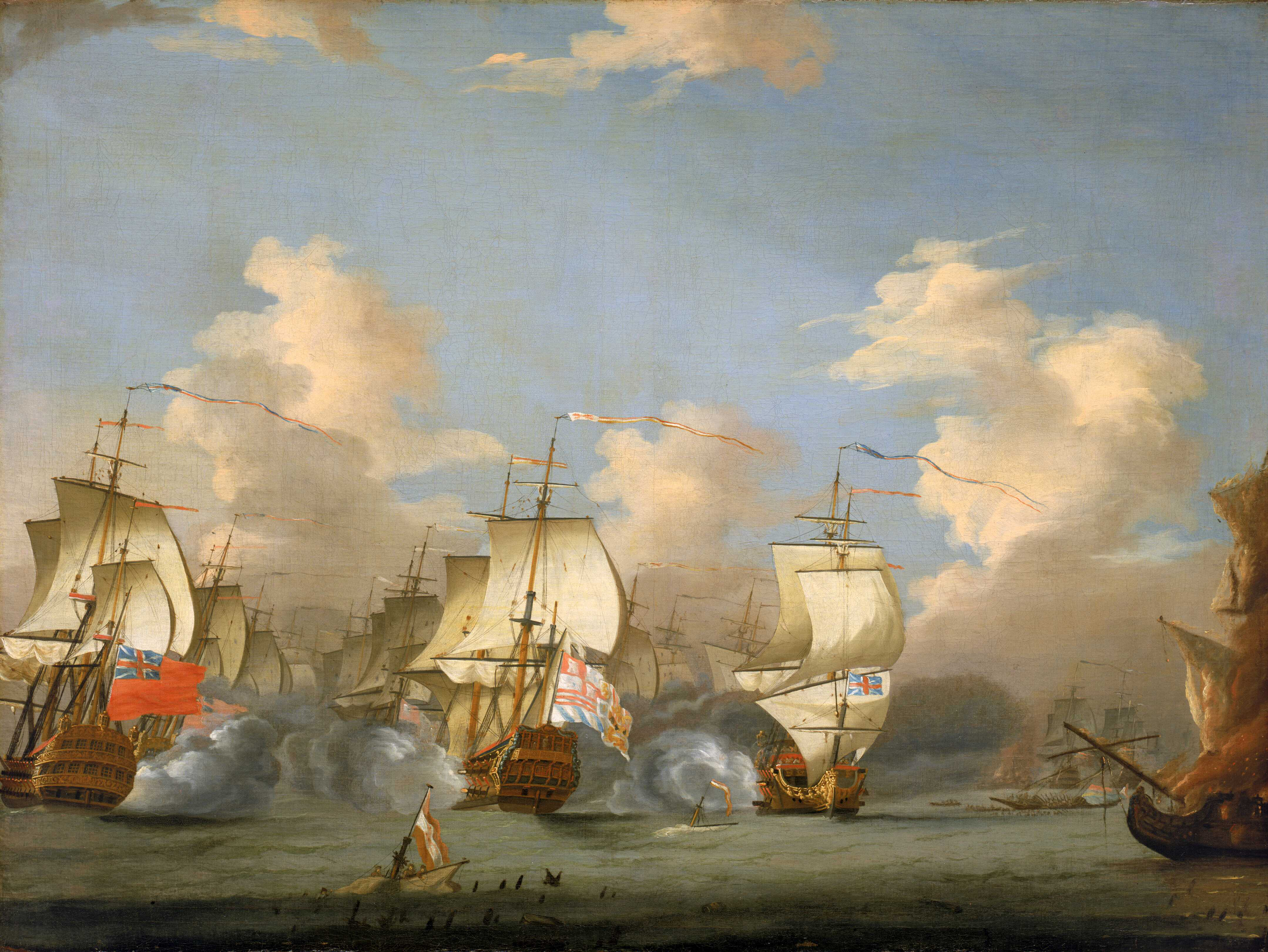
The Battle of Cape Passaro, 11 August 1718

Throughout the 18th century, and well into the 19th, Monamy was consistently described in all references as "famous", even by Horace Walpole, although Walpole added that "he had little reason to expect his fame", because of his training as an apprentice, and "the views of his family". Later art-historical comment, partly influenced by Walpole, but especially during the 20th century, has tended to disparagement. In some cases these later accounts of Monamy's career, including the entry written by Lionel Cust in the first edition of the Dictionary of National Biography, 1885–1900, are wildly inaccurate. Although the entry for Monamy in E.H.H.Archibald's 1980 edition of his "Dictionary of Sea Painters" correctly gives Monamy's city of birth as London, it is otherwise riddled with a number of inexplicable errors. Notable among earlier inventive fabrications is an article which appeared in The Mariner's Mirror of April 1911, purporting to describe his life and work. Even this fantasy, however, does not suggest that Monamy was ever employed by the van de Velde family of marine painters, an unsupported assumption which first appeared in about 1950. Since about that time, or a little earlier, there has been a flow of paintings entering the market, and now forming parts of otherwise reputable collections, which can only be described as pastiches, detectable as inauthentic when compared with works that have solid 18th century provenance. In spite of the progressive adulteration of the Monamy oeuvre, and before the 20th century, it was nevertheless still possible for Julian Marshall to quote, in his Catalogue of Engraved National Portraits in the South Kensington National Art Library, 1895, that after completing his apprenticeship, Monamy had been "reckoned the finest painter of shipping in England."

A tendency of later critics and art historians is to suppose that Monamy experienced little competition as a marine painter, following the death of the Younger van de Velde in 1707. The truth, however, is that there were several native rivals in the marine genre, including Isaac Sailmaker (after 70 years in England he can be counted a virtual Englishman); Francis Place; the Vale brothers, Humphrey and Robert; Thomas Baston; J.Boon; Robert Woodcock; and later J.Cook; Samuel Scott; Thomas Mellish; Thomas Allen; and others active during Monamy's final two decades.
