= Nicolas Deschamps =

Nicolas Deschamps may refer to:

- Nicolas Deschamps (ice hockey) (born 1990), Canadian ice hockey player
- Nicolas Deschamps (writer) (1797–1872), French Jesuit writer
