= The Night Porter =

1974 film by Liliana Cavani

- Theatrical release poster
- Italian: Il portiere di notte
- Directed by: Liliana Cavani
- Screenplay by: Liliana Cavani; Italo Moscati; Barbara Alberti (Note: Collaboration); Amedeo Pagani
- Story by: Liliana Cavani; Barbara Alberti; Amedeo Pagani
- Produced by: Robert Gordon Edwards; Esa De Simone
- Starring: Dirk Bogarde; Charlotte Rampling; Philippe Leroy; Gabriele Ferzetti
- Cinematography: Alfio Contini
- Edited by: Franco Arcalli
- Music by: Daniele Paris
- Production company: Lotar Film
- Distributed by: Ital-Noleggio Cinematografico
- Release dates: 3 April 1974 (France); 11 April 1974 (Italy)
- Running time: 118 minutes
- Country: Italy
- Languages: English; German
- Box office: $1.3 million (West Germany)

The Night Porter (Italian: Il portiere di notte) is a 1974 Italian erotic psychological war drama film co-written and directed by Liliana Cavani. It stars Dirk Bogarde and Charlotte Rampling, with Philippe Leroy, Gabriele Ferzetti, and Isa Miranda in supporting roles. Set in Vienna in 1957, the film centers on the sadomasochistic relationship between a former Nazi extermination camp officer (Bogarde) and one of his inmates (Rampling).

The film's themes of sexual and sadomasochistic obsession, and its use of Holocaust imagery, have made the film controversial since its initial release, dividing critics over its artistic value. In July 2018, it was selected to be screened in the Venice Classics section of the 75th Venice International Film Festival.

== Plot ==
During World War II, Maximilian Theo Aldorfer, a Nazi SS officer who posed as a doctor to take sensational photographs in extermination camps, and Lucia, a teenage girl interned in one such camp due to her father's socialist political ties, had an ambiguous sadomasochistic relationship. Max tormented Lucia, but also acted as her protector.

In 1957, Lucia, now married to an American orchestra conductor, meets Max again by chance. Max is now a night porter at a hotel in Vienna, Austria, and a reluctant member of a group of former SS comrades who have been carefully covering up their pasts by destroying documents and eliminating witnesses to their wartime activities. Max has an upcoming mock trial at the hands of the group for his war crimes. The group's leader, Hans Vogler, accuses Max of wanting to live "hidden away like a church mouse" while Max refutes that he wishes to remain hidden but still supports the group's activities.

During Max's night shift at the hotel, Max reconnected with Lucia through a bit of roughhousing. Because she could testify against him, Lucia's existence is a threat to Max and his former comrades. He goes to see a former Nazi collaborator, Mario, who knows Lucia is still alive; Max murders him to protect his secret and Lucia. After Lucia's husband leaves for Berlin for business, Max and Lucia renew their past lovemaking in Max's apartment.

Max confesses to Countess Stein, another guest at his hotel, that he has found his "little girl". Intrigued, Stein probes for their romance situation. Max divulges their story of when Lucia sings a Marlene Dietrich song, "Wenn ich mir was wünschen dürfte" ("If I Could Make a Wish"), to the camp guards while wearing pieces of an SS uniform, and Max "rewards" her with the severed head of a male inmate who had been bullying her, referencing Salome. The Countess tells him that he is insane; Max replies that they are both "in the same boat."

Meanwhile, Vogler has Max spied on by Adolph, a youth who works at the hotel. Max is interviewed by the police about Mario's murder. He spends days with Lucia in his apartment, chaining her to the wall so that "they can't take her away", and sleeps little. Vogler, who wants Lucia to testify against Max in the mock trial—though he harbors more ambiguous long-term intentions towards her—visits and informs her that Max is ill. He suggests that Lucia must also be ill to allow herself to be in this position, but she sends him away, claiming to be with Max of her own free will.

The former SS officers are infuriated at Max for hiding a key witness. Max refuses to proceed with the trial, calling it a "farce," and admits he works as a night porter because of his sense of shame during the day. He returns to Lucia, telling her that the police questioned him and others at the hotel about her disappearance, and that no suspicion fell on him. Eventually, Max quits his job, devoting all of his time to Lucia. The former SS officers cut off the couple's food supply from a nearby grocery store. When Max briefly walks along an outdoor terrace, Vogler shoots and wounds him. Max barricades the apartment door, and he and Lucia begin rationing.

Max seeks help by phoning his old hotel colleagues, who refuse to be implicated by him. He tries asking his neighbor to run an errand, who is unwilling to provide aid and is harboring Adolph in her apartment. Max retreats into the apartment, where Lucia is almost unconscious from malnutrition. After one of the former SS officers cuts off the electricity to Max's apartment, Max and Lucia, respectively dressed in his Nazi uniform and a negligee resembling one he gave her in the extermination camp, leave the building and drive away, followed by a car driven by Max's former colleagues. Max parks on a bridge, and he and Lucia get out and walk along the bridge rail as dawn breaks. Two gunshots ring out, and the lovers fall dead.

== Cast ==
- Dirk Bogarde as Maximilian Theo Aldorfer
- Charlotte Rampling as Lucia
- Philippe Leroy as Klaus
- Gabriele Ferzetti as Hans Vogler
- Giuseppe Addobbati as Stumm
- Isa Miranda as Countess Stein
- Nino Bignamini as Adolph
- Marino Masè as Atherton
- Amedeo Amodio as Bert
- Piero Vida as Day Porter
- Geoffrey Copleston as Kurt
- Manfred Freyberger as Dobson
- Ugo Cardea as Mario
- Hilda Gunther as Greta
- Nora Ricci as neighbour
- Piero Mazzinghi as concierge
- Kai S. Seefeld as Jacob
- Luigi Antonio Guerra (uncredited)

== Production ==
=== Development ===
Director Liliana Cavani co-wrote the screenplay for The Night Porter with Italo Moscati, Barbara Alberti, Amedeo Pagani. Cavani developed the idea for the film while making the 1965 documentary Women in the Resistance (Italian: La donna nella Resistenza) for Italian television on internment camps. During a halt in the production due to weather conditions, Cavani observed a woman placing a sheaf of roses at the site of a former prisoner camp. Intrigued, Cavani approached the woman.

There had been no family. She was not Jewish. She came back, she said, every year on the anniversary of her lover’s death. He was a member of the SS, she was a girl who had been imprisoned for holding Socialist beliefs, and having a well-known Socialist father. The hut foundations, where she placed her roses, were the site of the one in which she had been imprisoned; the day was the anniversary of the day on which her lover had been executed by the liberating Americans. She lived now in America but came back every year on that day. It was perfectly simply told, and unemotional. She left in the rain leaving Cavani with a story which haunted her for months.

As part of the documentary, Cavani interviewed the partisan and Ravensbrück survivor Lidia Beccaria Rolfi. The scholar Giovanni Miglianti posits that the film was greatly inspired by Beccaria's testimony, particulaty Cavani's interpretation of Beccaria's annual visit to Ravensbrück as being sexual in nature. Miglianti further posits that Beccaria's 1978 work Le donne di Ravensbrück. Testimonianze di deportate politiche Italiane, co-written with Anna Maria Bruzzone and the first Italian-language book about the deportation of Italian women to concentration camps, could be interpreted as an attempt by Beccaria to both reclaim her story and to disavow the sexual stereotypes of former female political deportees. Cavani also developed the story after interviewing two female Italian partisans who had survived Nazi internment camps: one, who spent three years in Dachau, told Cavani that she returned to the camp every year during the holidays " for reasons she would not—perhaps could not–explain"; and another who, after being freed from Auschwitz, found herself unable to return to her husband and children "because she was treated like a wretch, and made to feel she was an embarrassment, a reminder of something too disturbing. She had experienced cruelty, horror, ordeals—but what she could not forgive was being made by the Nazis to perceive the depths of human nature."

=== Filming ===
Filming took place in Vienna and at Cinecittà Studios in Rome. Locations included the Vienna Volksoper, the Linke Wienzeile Buildings, the Mozarthaus, the Vienna Central Cemetery, Karl-Marx-Hof, and Schönbrunn Palace. The concentration camp scenes were shot in the Tuscolano district of Rome. The film's costumes were designed by five-time Oscar-nominee Piero Tosi.

The budget, which had been paid for by the Italian distributor, ran out near the end of the shooting of the film's interiors at Cinecittà. To ensure the film's completion, producer Robert Gordon Edwards instructed editor Franco Arcalli to create a rough cut of the best scenes that had been shot, which he presented to an American colleague who worked at Les Artistes Associés (the French arm of United Artists). On the basis of the rough cut, the company agreed to pay for the filming of the exterior scenes in Vienna in exchange for French distribution rights.

Romy Schneider turned down the role of Lucia. Mia Farrow was considered, as well as Dominique Sanda, before Charlotte Rampling was cast. Rampling shot the film only four months after giving birth to her son Barnaby. She and Dirk Bogarde re-wrote and ad-libbed much of their dialogue. Bogarde also enlisted Anthony Forwood to help rewrite the script, uncredited. Bogarde seriously considered retiring from acting after the end of principal photography, which he considered a very draining experience.

=== Post-production ===
Several of the actors' voices were dubbed in post-production, including Philippe Leroy (by Edmund Purdom), Gabriele Ferzetti (by David de Keyser) and Geoffrey Copleston (by Charles Howerton).

== Reception ==
=== Critical response ===
On Rotten Tomatoes, the film holds an approval rating of 67% based on 33 reviews, with an average rating of 5.8/10. The website's critics consensus reads, "The Night Porter's salaciousness gives its exploration of historical trauma a bitter aftertaste, but audiences seeking provocation are unlikely to forget the sting of this erotic drama." In response to The Night Porter, Cavani was both celebrated for her courage in dealing with the theme of sexual transgression and, simultaneously, castigated for the controversial manner in which she presented that transgression within the context of a Nazi Holocaust narrative. The film met with particular criticism in the United States, with several high-profile American film critics finding the subject matter obscene.

Roger Ebert of the Chicago Sun-Times thought the main roles were well-performed, but nonetheless gave the film one star out of four, and called The Night Porter "as nasty as it is lubricious, a despicable attempt to titillate us by exploiting memories of persecution and suffering", while adding that he did not "object per se to the movie's subject matter." In The New York Times, Nora Sayre praised the performances of Bogarde and Rampling, and the "dark, rich tones" of the cinematography, but began her review by writing, "If you don't love pain, you won't find The Night Porter erotic—and by now, even painbuffs may be satiated with Nazi decadence." Vincent Canby, also writing for The New York Times, called it "romantic pornography" and "a piece of junk". Leonard Maltin's 2015 Movie Guide called it a "[s]leazy, bizarre drama", awarding it two out of four stars.

In Europe, the film was met with opposition as well. German magazine Filmdienst categorised the film as "political pornography". Despite the poor German critical response, it grossed over $1.3 million. In the French Cahiers du Cinéma, Michel Foucault criticised what he saw as a sexualised vision of Nazism.

In her 2000 essay for the Criterion Collection release, Annette Insdorf called The Night Porter "a provocative and problematic film. ... [I]t can be seen as an exercise in perversion and exploitation of the Holocaust for the sake of sensationalism. On the other hand, a closer reading of this English-language psychological thriller suggests a dark vision of compelling characters doomed by their World War II past." In his 2020 review for The Guardian, Peter Bradshaw described the film as a "dated" but "intriguing period piece", adding, "Perhaps there is something in its very crassness, horror and tastelessness that does at least jolt us towards an acknowledgment of pure evil."

Mikel J. Koven characterised The Night Porter as a "Nazi sexploitation" film.

=== Accolades ===
The film was nominated in two categories at the 1975 Nastro d'Argento Awards, for Best Director (Liliana Cavani) and for Best Screenplay (Cavani and Italo Moscati), but did not win in either category.

== See also ==
- List of cult films
- Sadism and masochism in fiction
- Films dealing with Nazism and sexuality

== Sources ==
- Conley, Timothy K. (2016). Screening Vienna: The City of Dreams in English-Language Cinema and Television. Amherst, New York: Cambria Press. ISBN 978-1-62196-716-3.
- Koven, Mikel J. (2004). "'The Film You Are About to See Is Based on Documented Fact': Italian Nazi Sexploitation Cinema". In Mathijs, Ernest; Mendik, Xavier (eds.). Alternative Europe: Eurotrash and Exploitation Cinema Since 1945. London, England: Wallflower Press. ISBN 978-1-903364-93-2.
- Magilow, Daniel H.; Silverman, Lisa (2015). Holocaust Representations in History: An Introduction. New York City, New York: Bloomsbury. ISBN 978-1-472-51300-7.
- Maltin, Leonard, ed. (2014). Leonard Maltin's 2015 Movie Guide: The Modern Era. New York City, New York: Signet. ISBN 9780451468499.
