= Snow (ship) =

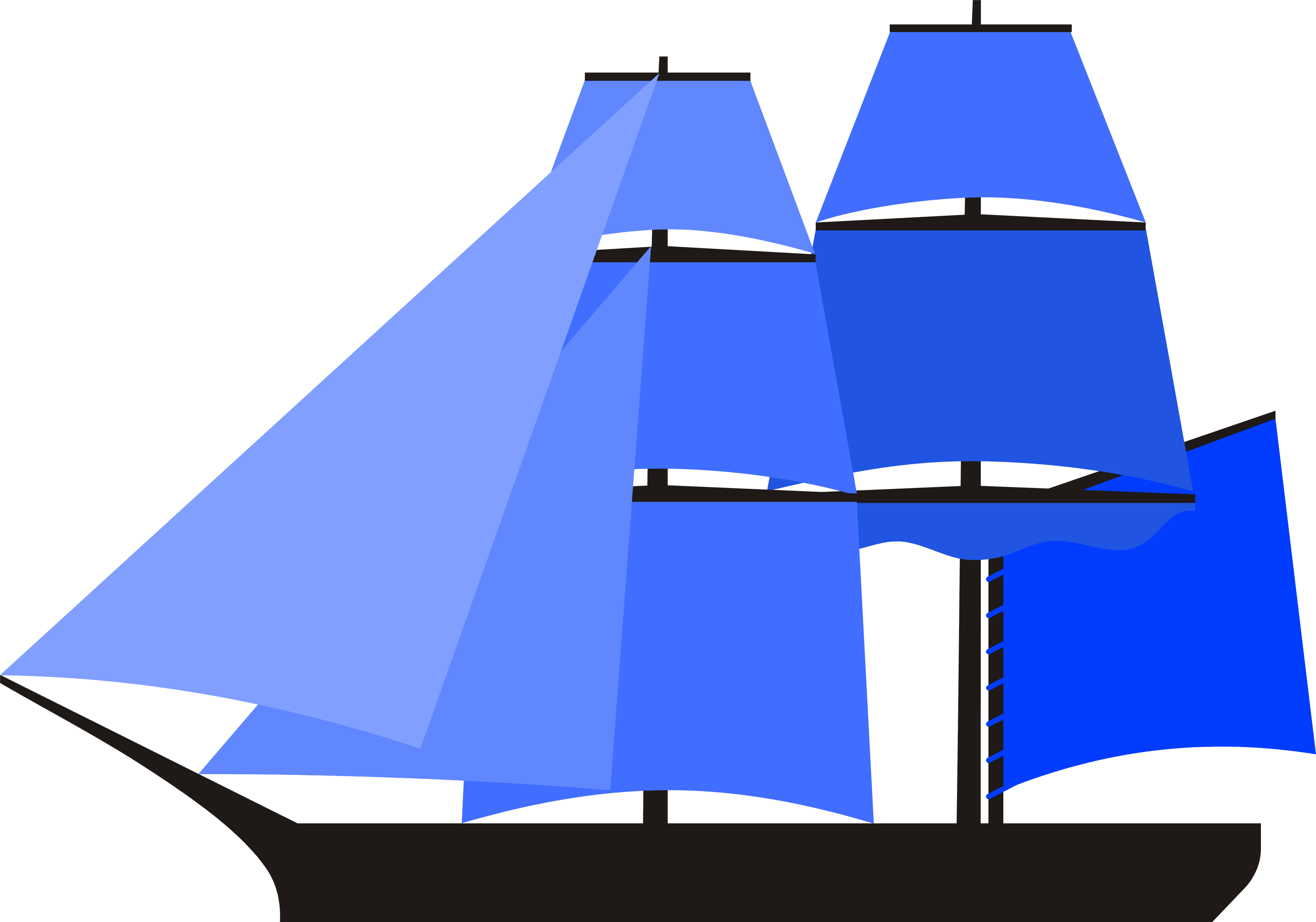
- Schematic view of a snow, showing the snow-mast, a loose footed gaff sail and clewed up main course
- Type: Sailing rig
- Place of origin: Northern Europe

In sailing, a snow, snaw or snauw is a square-rigged vessel with two masts, complemented by a snow- or trysail-mast stepped immediately abaft (behind) the main mast.

== History ==
The word 'snow' comes from 'snauw', which is an old Dutch word for beak, a reference to the characteristic sharp bow of the vessel. The snow evolved from the (three-masted) ship: the mizzen mast of a ship was gradually moved closer towards the mainmast, until the mizzen mast was no longer a separate mast, but was instead made fast at the main mast top. As such, in the 17th century the snow used to be sometimes classified as a three-masted vessel.

The snow dates back to the late 17th century and originally had a loose-footed gaff sail; the boom was introduced somewhere in the 18th century. It was a popular type of vessel in the Baltic Sea and was employed by a large number of nations during its time. The snow was considered a handy and fast sailing vessel, typically the largest two-masted vessel around, and was employed in both navy and merchant service. When used as a naval vessel, snows were, in the early 18th century, typically fitted with 5 to 16 guns. Naval snows were mostly used for coastal patrols and privateering whereas in the merchant service snows traded all the way to the Mediterranean and sometimes even sailed as far as the West Indies.

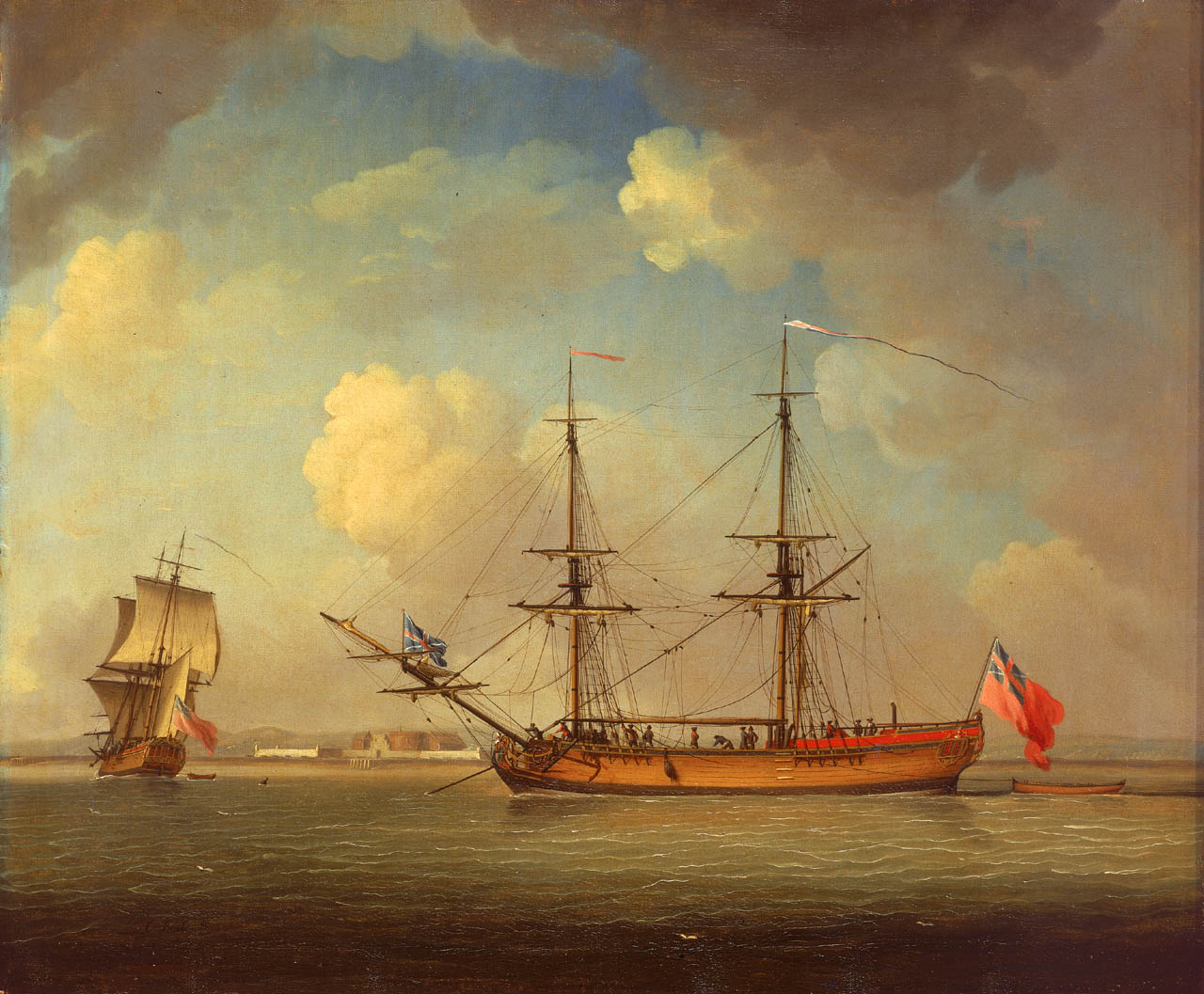
1759 painting of a Royal Navy snow in two positions by Charles Brooking

Snow: the largest of all old two-masted vessels. The sails and rigging on the main mast of a snow are exactly similar to those on the same masts in a full-rigged ship; only that there is a small mast behind the mainmast of the former, which carries a sail nearly resembling the mizzen of a ship.

— Captain Charles Johnson, A General History of the Pyrates

== Comparison with brig ==
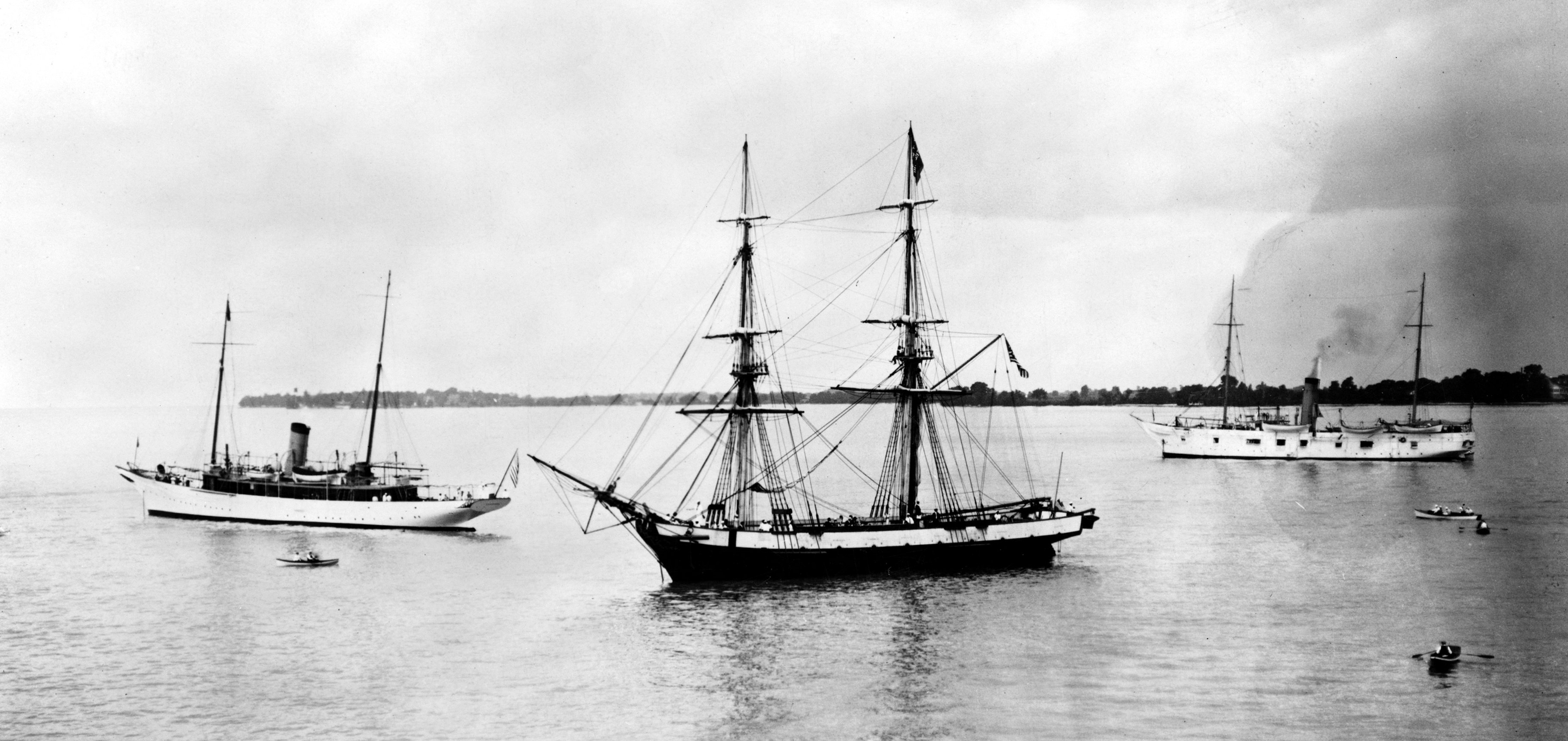
The "snow-brig" USS Niagara (center) in 1913

While the snow and the brig might appear closely related, this is in fact not the case. The two rigs developed from different directions, the brig evolving from the generally smaller brigantine, and the much older snow evolving from the larger three-masted ship.

The most visible difference between the brig and the snow is the latter's "snow-mast", stepped directly behind the main mast. In contrast to the brig, where the gaff and boom attach directly to the main mast, a snow's gaff, and in later times, its boom, were attached to the snow-mast. The use of this characteristic snow-mast offered several advantages over attaching the gaff directly to the main mast.

The yoke (or jaw) of the gaff and the lacing of the gaff sail on a snow could move freely on the snow mast, unhindered by the iron bands that held together the (main) mast, nor limited by the main yard. The gaff on the snow mast could be raised higher than the main yard and independently of it. The resulting freedom allowed a snow, in contrast to a brig, to fly a main course without complications, as they typically did.

However, in the late 18th century, brigs started to set main courses as well, which gave rise to the term snow-brig. The differences lessened even further when the snow-mast was replaced by a steel cable, at which point the term "snow-brig" gradually became interchangeable with the term "brig" and the term "snow" fell in disuse.

The twin brigs Lawrence and Niagara, American warships which participated in the Battle of Lake Erie in 1813, were both snow-brigs.

== In popular culture ==
In Patrick O'Brian's 1969 novel Master and Commander, the first in the Aubrey-Maturin series, the sloop HMS Sophie is disguised as a civilian snow by rigging a cable vertically behind the mainmast.

== See also ==
- Brig
- Brigantine
- Full-rigged ship
