= Monamy Swaine =

British painter (c.1750–c.1800)

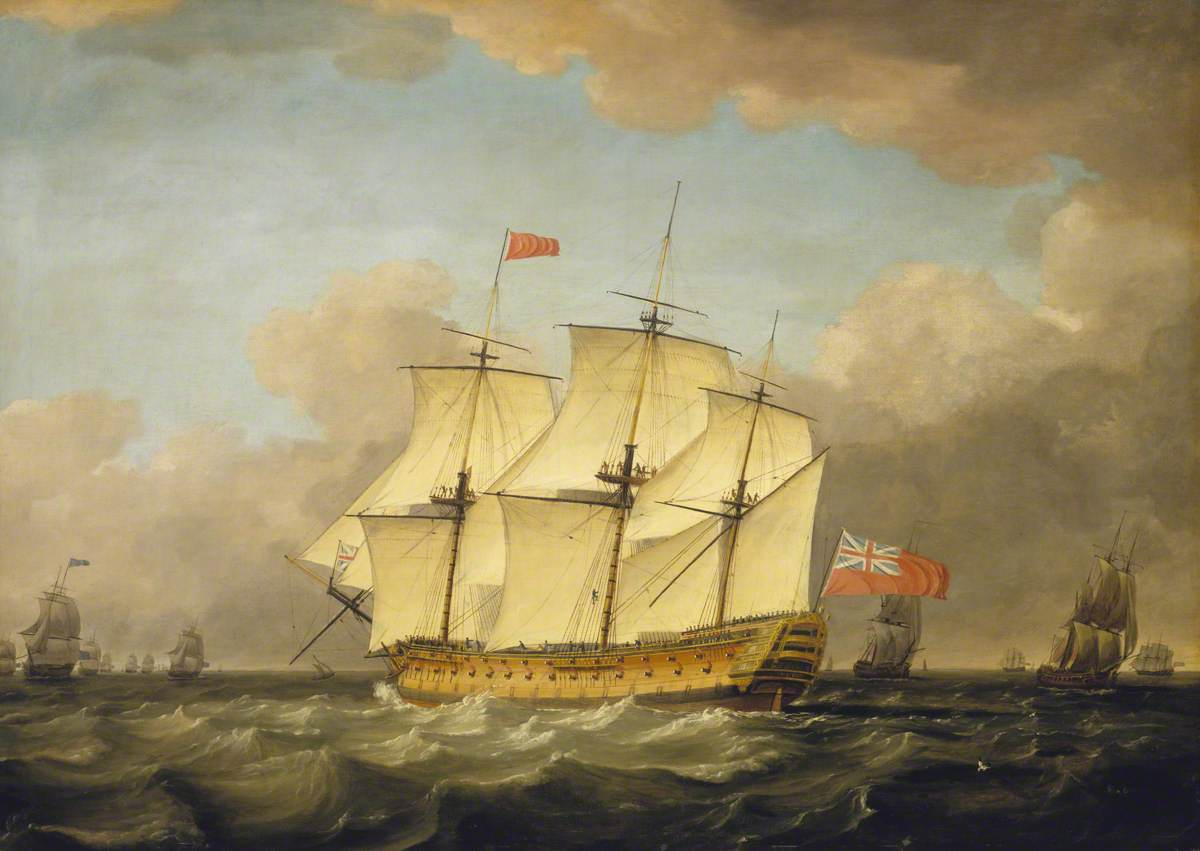
Swaine's The 'Victory' Leaving the Channel in 1793 held by the National Maritime Museum

Monamy Swaine (c.1750–c.1800) was a British painter. His works are held in collections including the National Maritime Museum. His father was the artist Francis Swaine (c.1715-1782) and his mother, Mary, was the daughter of the artist Peter Monamy (1681-1749).

Swaine specialised in still-life, genre paintings, and marine paintings. He exhibited at the Free Society of Artists from 1769 to 1774.

== Gallery ==
Some of Swaine's paintings:

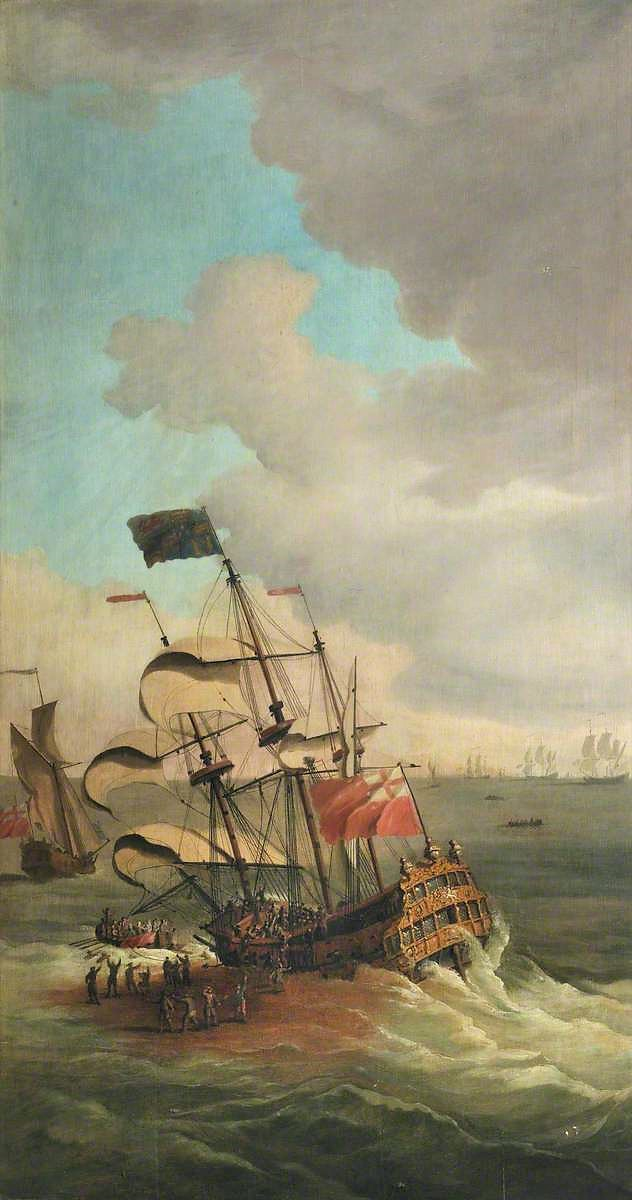
The Wreck of HMS 'Gloucester' off Yarmouth, 6 May 1682

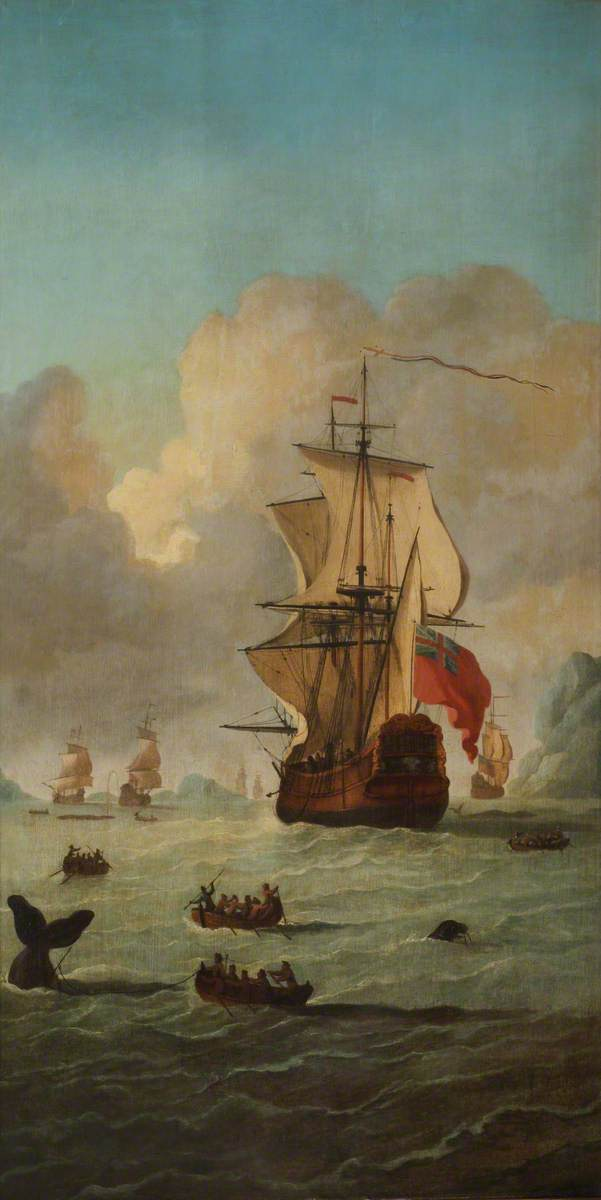
A Whaling Scene

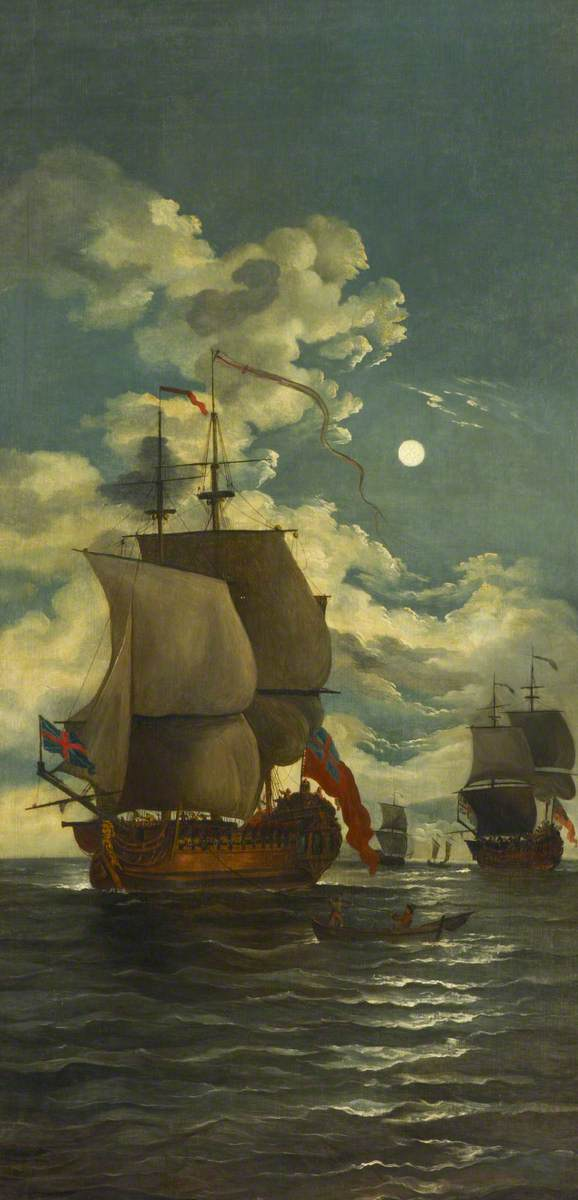
Moonlight Scene - Ships Saluting

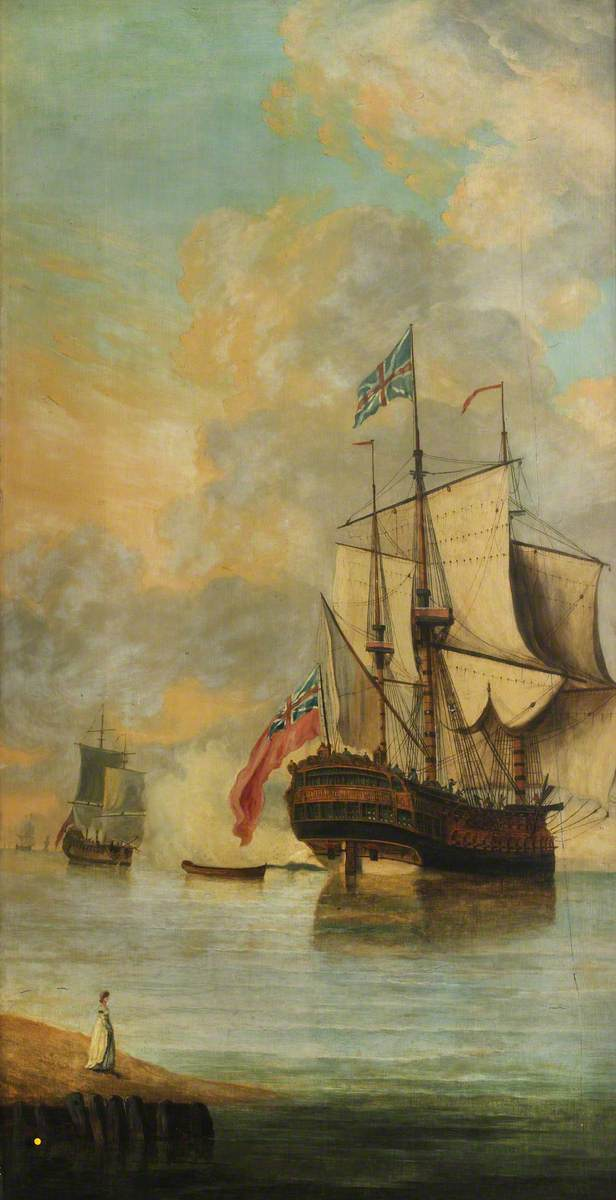
An English Flagship Saluting

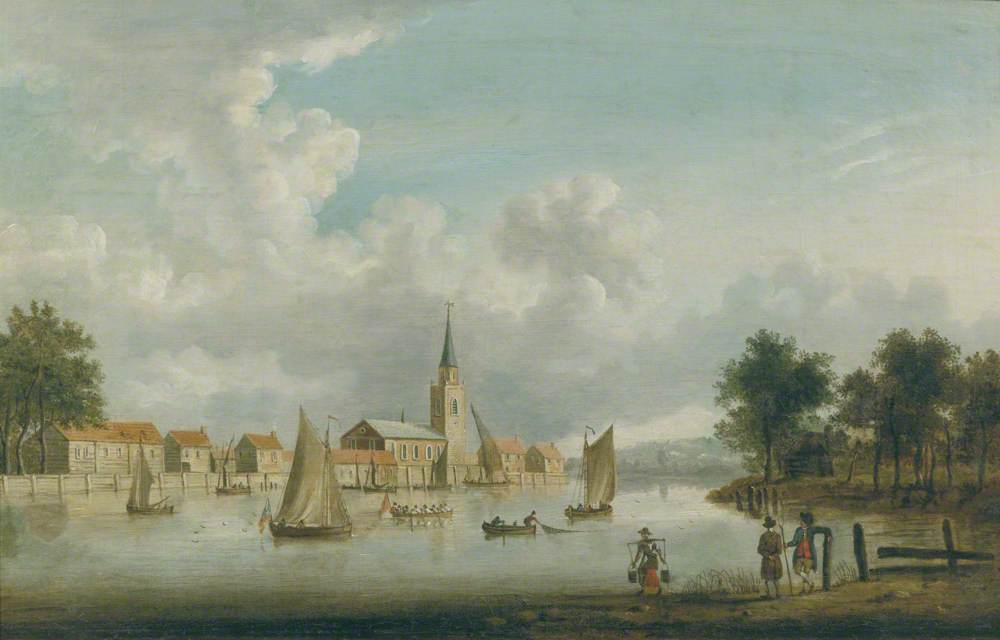
The Thames at Battersea, London

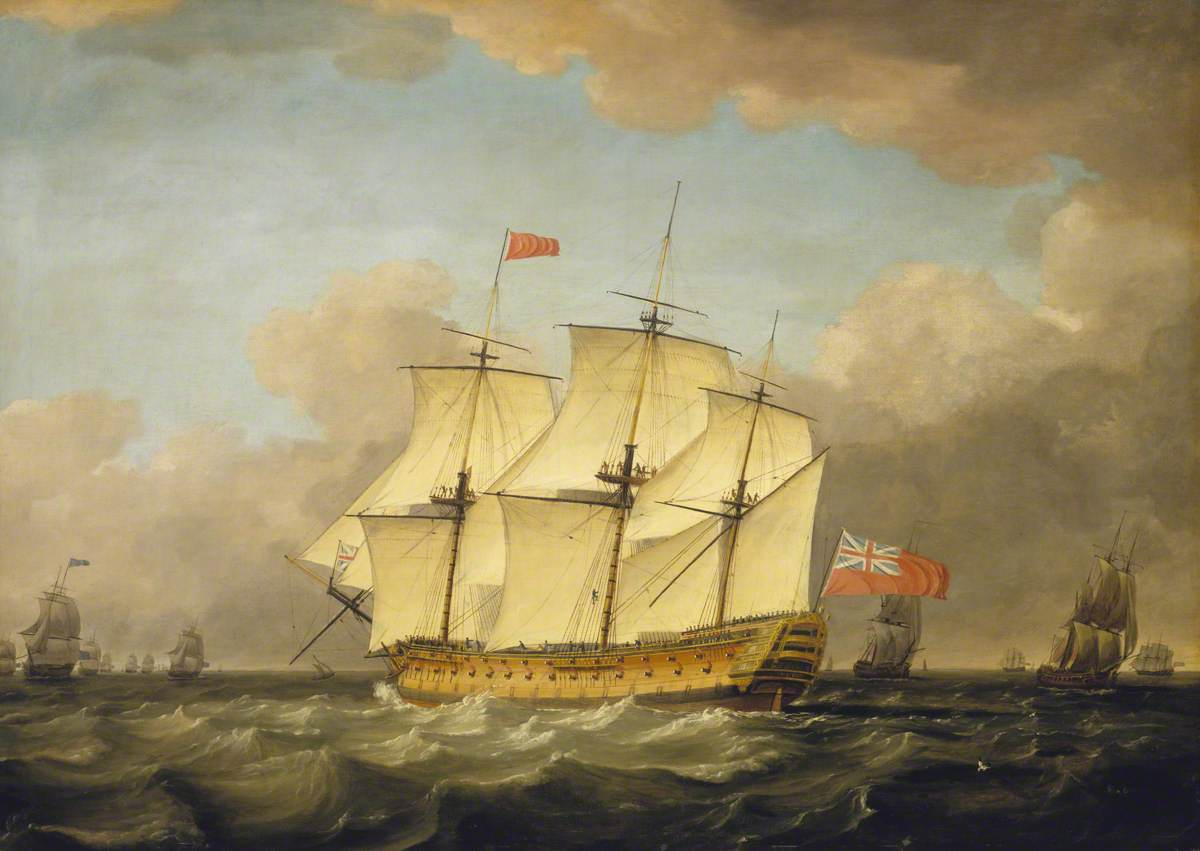
The 'Victory' Leaving the Channel in 1793
