= Kootz =

Kootz is a surname. Notable people with the surname include:

- Johanna Kootz (born 1942), German librarian and sociologist.
- Samuel M. Kootz (1898-1982) American art dealer and author
