= 't =

Contraction of the article "het", meaning "the"

In the Dutch language, the word 't (Dutch pronunciation: [ət]) is a contraction of the article "het", meaning "the". 't can be found as a tussenvoegsel, a word that is positioned between a person's first and last name. Careful writers should use an apostrophe (U+2019 ’ RIGHT SINGLE QUOTATION MARK) in front of the t – and not confuse it with a left quotation mark (U+2018 ‘ LEFT SINGLE QUOTATION MARK) and put a space before the apostrophe.

== Examples ==
- Dirk van 't Klooster
- Evert-Jan 't Hoen
- Gerard 't Hooft
- Haas Visser 't Hooft
- in 't Veld (surname)
  - Bart Spring in 't Veld (note: surname is "Spring in 't Veld")
  - Sophie in 't Veld
- Jacobus Henricus van 't Hoff
- John van 't Schip
- Maarten 't Hart
- Tom van 't Hek
- Van 't Hof (surname)
- Van 't Wout (surname)
- Willem Visser 't Hooft
- Youp van 't Hek

== See also ==
- Definite article reduction, a similar contraction in some dialects of English
- N-apostrophe, a similar digraph in Afrikaans.
