= Van der Velde =

Van der Velde, Vandervelde or Vander Velde is a Dutch-language toponymic surname meaning "from the field". Common variations on this name include Van der Velden, Van de Velde and Vandevelde.

Notable people with the surname include:

- Carl Franz van der Velde (1779–1824), German judge and author of historical novels
- Carol Ruth Vander Velde (1926–1972), American mathematician
- Charles William Meredith van de Velde (1818–1898) Dutch painter and cartographer
- David Vandervelde, American indie-pop musician
- Emile Vandervelde (1866–1938), Belgian politician, President of the International Socialist Bureau
- Hennie van der Velde (b. 1944), Dutch swimmer
- Janika Vandervelde (b. 1955), American composer
- Johan van der Velde (b. 1956), Dutch cyclist
- Julian Vandervelde (b. 1987), American football player
- Jürgen Van der Velde (b. 1977), Belgian football goalkeeper
- Jurjen van der Velde (b. 2002) Dutch professional darts player
- Martine van der Velde (born 1989), Dutch politician
- Nadine Van der Velde (b. 1962), Canadian American actress, producer, and writer
- Ricardo van der Velde (b. 1987), Dutch cyclist
- Riemer van der Velde (b. 1940), Dutch football club chairman
- Rien van der Velde (b. 1957), Dutch politician
- Sam Vandervelde (b. 1971), American mathematician

== See also ==
- Vandervelde metro station, metro station in Brussels
- Van de Velde
