= Bram van Velde =

Dutch painter (1891–1985)

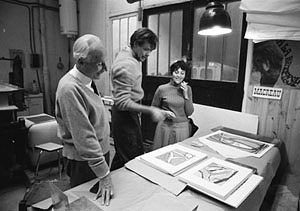
photo of Bram van Velde (left) in 1969, looking at his lithographs, printed by Peter Bramsen; photo of Erling Mandelmann

Abraham "Bram" Gerardus van Velde (19 October 1895 – 28 December 1981) was a Dutch painter known for an intensely colored and geometric semi-representational painting style related to Tachisme, and Lyrical Abstraction. He is often seen as member of the School of Paris but his work resides somewhere between expressionism and surrealism, and evolved in the 1960s into an expressive abstract art. His paintings from the 1950s are similar to the contemporary work of Matisse, Picasso and the abstract expressionist Adolph Gottlieb. He was championed by a number of French-speaking writers, including Samuel Beckett and the poet André du Bouchet.

== Early life ==
Bram van Velde was born in Zoeterwoude, near Leiden, into an intensely poor family, and this would mark him profoundly for life. His mother, Catharina von der Voorst (1867–1949) was the illegitimate daughter of a Count. His father, Willem van Velde (1868–1914) owned a small company engaged in water transportation on the Rhine. Bram was the second of four children (his sister Cornelia was born in 1892, Geer and Jacoba were born in 1898 and 1903). After going bankrupt, the father abandoned the family; the mother and children moved repeatedly over the next years, from Leyden to Lisse, and finally to The Hague.

In 1907, the young Bram entered into service as an apprentice in the painting and interior decorating company of Schaijk & Kramers in The Hague. He was encouraged in his art by the co-owner Eduard H. Kramers and his son Wijnand, who were appreciators and collectors of art, and these two would become Bram van Velde's artistic patrons until around 1934. Because of his status as bread-winner for his family, Bram van Velde was exempted from service in the First World War, and he was able to continue his work as a painter and decorator, and to enroll in the Mauritshuis of The Hague, where he was able to copy masterworks in the collection.

== Early career ==
In 1922, the Kramers encouraged van Velde to travel and gave him a monthly stipend. He went first to Munich in May, then to north of Bremen (in Worpswede) in June, where, since the 1890s, there existed a colony of expressionist artists. This three-month exposure to contemporary art revolutionized van Velde's work. He left Worpswede shortly after, and moved to Paris (in the Belleville quartier, 19th arrondissement). His career progressed slowly, and in February 1927 he exhibited his works in Bremen. This was followed by the Jury-Freie Kunstschau of Berlin in April. Finally, he (with his brother Geer) was admitted into the Salon des Indépendants in Paris, where he would show his works several times (1928 to 1932, in 1940 and 1941). In this period he went to Chartres in the company of Otto Freundlich, and also discovered the works of Henri Matisse (probably at the home of Paul Guillaume). Matisse would have a great impact on van Velde's work (as too, in coming years, would van Velde's discovery of Pablo Picasso).

On 6 October 1928, van Velde married the German painter Lilly (Sophie Caroline) Klöker (1896–1936), whom he had been seeing since perhaps his stay at Worpswede. With the Great Depression, their material conditions deteriorated and they moved to Spain, and in September 1932 they were living in Mallorca. It is here that van Velde used the early painting of Matisse as his inspiration and he made a series of still-lives in which his later abstraction started to show itself. When the Spanish Civil War started in 1936, Lilly died in a hospital and Bram van Velde fled back to Marseille with several of his canvases made on Mallorca. He came back to Paris and moved in with his brother Geer. He met Marthe Arnaud, a former Lutheran missionary in the Zambezi, and they became a couple. At the studio of his brother Geer van Velde—also becoming an abstract painter—Bram van Velde met the writer Samuel Beckett, and the two would develop a friendship. Stopped on the street by the police in 1938 because he was speaking German with Marthe, van Velde was briefly imprisoned (his papers were not in order), and brief incarcerations would occur several times in the coming years.

== Maturity ==
In 1939, van Velde came upon his own painting style while working in a large-format with gouache. He stopped painting in 1941, but began again in autumn 1945. His first solo exhibition opened on 21 March 1946 in Paris in the "Galerie Mai" with 25 canvases, nearly all of his existing works, but the show was a failure. Beckett wrote his first essay on his work in les Cahiers d'art de Zervos. In 1947, van Velde signed a contract with the Galerie Maeght in Paris, and in 1948 he showed his work in the Kootz gallery in New York, but this was also a commercial failure, despite a good review by Willem de Kooning. After one more commercial disaster at Maeght, van Velde stopped painting for a year. In 1952, Maeght canceled their contract with him, while retaining his works.

In 1958, Franz Meyer organized the first museum exposition of Bram van Velde, a retrospective at the Kunsthalle of Bern. The couple Bram-Marthe left Paris the same year, but Marthe died the following year (11 August), having been hit by a car during a brief trip to Paris. At Christmas 1959, Bram van Velde met Madeleine in Geneva, and the two became a couple.

Starting in 1961, van Velde began to achieve a certain critical success. Jean-Michel Meurice made a documentary film about the artist. Younger expressive painters such as Pierre Alechinsky and the Danish Cobra-painter Asger Jorn admired Van Velde's art and his privat vue on art very strongly; they met him frequently and let their own art be influenced by his expressive art. Van Velde shuttled between Paris and Geneva, and in 1967 he moved to the latter. When the relation with Madeleine broke down, he returned to the Bourgogne where he lived and worked in a very sober little house. In 1957 Van Velde made his first lithography, and with the help of Jaques Putman he made long series of lithographies in the following years.

In 1962, 1964 and 1968, van Velde had exhibitions in the United States organized by the Knoedler gallery. In 1968 the art critic can appreciate him as 'an important abstract expressionist painter with an independent vision'. In 1962 he visited Willem de Kooning—also of Dutch origins—but the contact between the two artists is not very satisfying for either side. After 1970, van Velde travelled to visit his own expositions in Poland, Iceland, Italy and Norway, Brussels, Copenhagen, Amsterdam and Rome. He did not make much new work during this period. In 1964, he was named "chevalier" of the Ordre des Arts et des Lettres, and the Netherlands awarded him the Order of Orange-Nassau in 1969. In 1973, he painted at La Chapelle-sur-Carouge several large gouaches which are seen as the last "savage" appearance of colour in his work. Aimé Maeght took him back in his gallery, almost 20 years after having dropped him. In 1975, he was received by universities in Lausanne, Geneva and Neuchâtel, and in 1980 he was made chevalier of the "Order of the Falcon" in Iceland. For his 80th birthday, a collective homage was published by the presses at Fata Morgana (Montpellier).

Bram van Velde died on 28 December 1981 at Grimaud (near Arles), and is buried there. His mentor and friend Jacques Putman, who supported him and his career after Bram's departure from Maeght, is buried beside him (Putman died on 27 February 1994 in Paris).
