= Johanna Kootz =

German librarian

Johanna Kootz (born 1942) is a German librarian and sociologist. She was a pioneer of women's studies and advancement at Free University of Berlin. In 2004, she was awarded the Margherita von Brentano Prize for her life's work.

== Life ==
Johanna Kootz trained as a librarian and then studied sociology at München and Berlin from 1965 to 1971. Her diploma thesis with Gisela Steppke entitled Zur Frauenfrage im Kapitalismus was published by Suhrkamp Verlag in 1973 with the collaboration of Germanist Gisela Brandt; three further editions followed until 1987. It is regarded as one of the first studies on women's and gender studies in the German-speaking world after 1945 and, according to Sabine Hark, "as the first German-language feminist monograph written in the radius of the emerging interface between the university and the New Women's Movement."

Johanna Kootz is the mother of a son. Marriage was out of the question for her in the 1970s because, in her opinion, it was associated with social and individual discrimination. Kootz said in 1977 in an interview with Spiegel editor Ariane Barth,

Without the women's movement I would not have had the courage to consider having a child.

== Work ==
Since the early 1970s, Johanna Kootz was instrumental in introducing women's issues into teaching and research at the FU. At that time, the opportunities for women to pursue science as a profession were limited and there were hardly any German-language publications dealing with equal rights for women. From the early 1970s, female students and lecturers protested against the underrepresentation of women in research and teaching and androcentrism in science. The first seminars for women's studies - then called "women's seminars" - were held at the Free University of Berlin in sociology and political science. Together with the sociologists Ulla Bock and Elisabeth Böhmer, Johanna Kootz was part of the planning group of the Central Institution for the Promotion of Women's Studies and Women's Research at Freie Universität Berlin (since 2000: Central Institution for the Promotion of Women's and Gender Studies, ZEFG), almost at the same time as the activities at Bielefeld University, these were the first institutions in West Germany to promote "women-specific research" (as it was called at the time) and young female academics. In 1981, she took over the management of the Center for Women's Studies as a research assistant.

In order to make the work and history of women visible, Johanna Kootz built up a library on women's and gender studies at the FU, which today comprises more than 6,200 volumes and 20 current journals and periodicals. She also initiated the documentation of women's research-related theses and qualifications at the FU Berlin since 1979 and the development of the database Habilitierte Frauen in Deutschland seit 1970. She was also one of the initiators of the Rhoda-Erdmann Program, which offers further training for women working in academia during their qualification phase.

Outside the university, Johanna Kootz was involved in the founding of the first women's shelter in West Germany in Berlin in 1976 and from 1977 to 1980 was part of the scientific support team for this shelter, which was initially set up as a model project. This resulted in the first comprehensive study on the situation of abused women and domestic violence in West Germany.

In 1995, Johanna Kootz began her collaboration with the Ravensbrück Memorial on the occasion of the German-Israeli project Victims and Survivors. Jewish Women Prisoners in Ravensbrück Concentration Camp During and After World War II, a cooperation between Tel Aviv University and the FU Berlin. In the following years, she offered at the Otto Suhr Institute on gender relations in National Socialism and the Ravensbrück concentration camp for women, to which she also invited former prisoners. As part of an interdisciplinary women's research group at the FU, she published the volume Das Frauenkonzentrationslager Ravensbrück - Quellenlage und Quellenkritik in 1997 together with the memorial site director Insa Eschebach. She dealt in particular with the history of the female Italian prisoners in Ravensbrück. She arranged for the translation of the accounts of Lidia Beccaria Rolfi and in 2007 published the book Zurückkehren als Fremde. From Ravensbrück to Italy: 1945-1948 and As an Italian in Ravensbrück in 2016.

After leaving Freie Universität in 2003, Johanna Kootz remained active in the "International Circle of Friends of the Ravensbrück Memorial".
