= Benjamin Deschamps =

Canadian jazz saxophonist

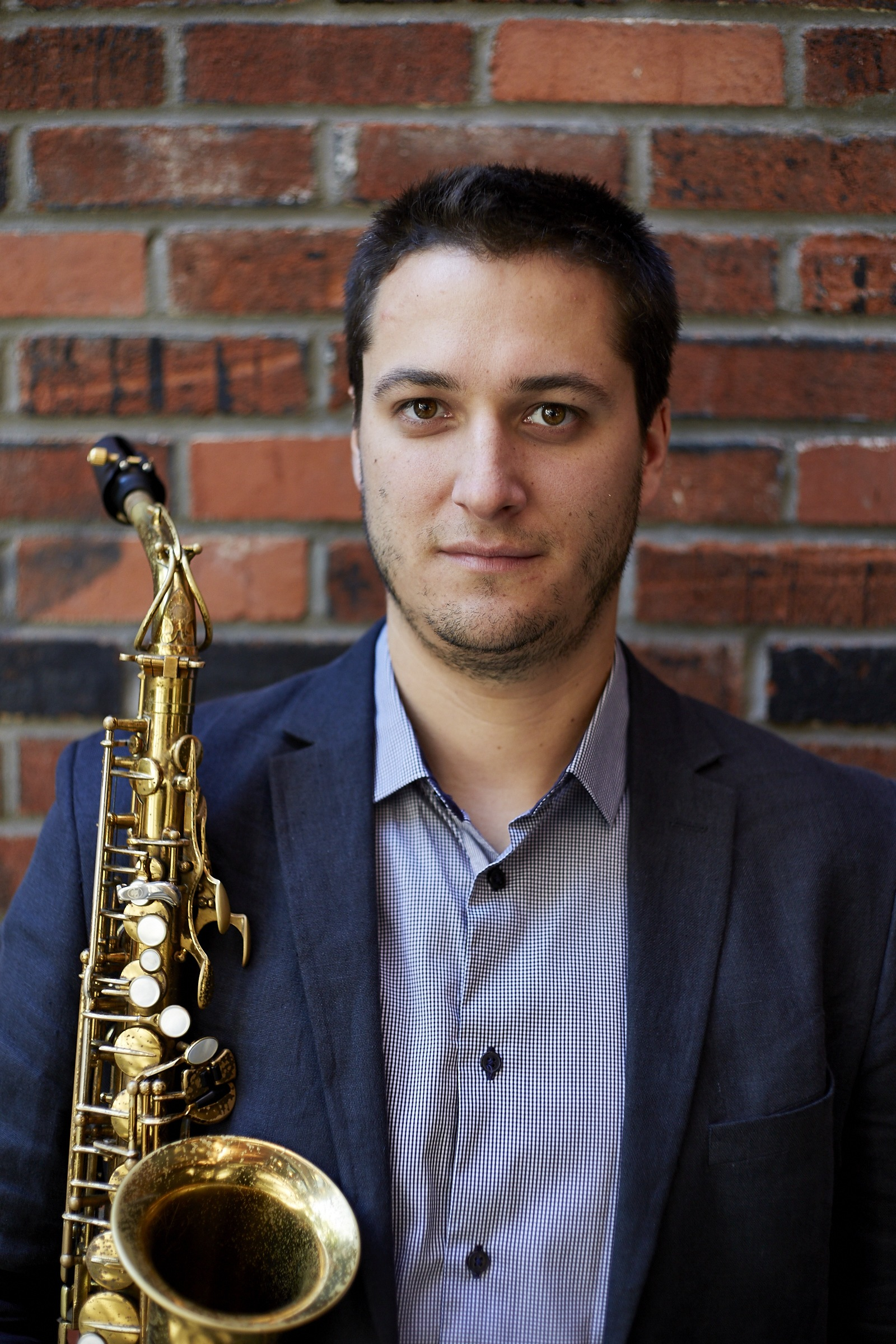

Background information
- Born: May 13, 1988 (age 37); Montreal
- Genres: Jazz
- Instruments: saxophone, flute, clarinet
- Website: https://www.benjamindeschamps.com/

Benjamin Deschamps is a Canadian jazz saxophonist based in Montreal. He has won numerous awards, including the 2017-2018 Révélation Radio-Canada en jazz. Although he is best known for his talents as a saxophonist and composer, he is also an arranger and plays the flute and clarinet.

== Biography ==
Benjamin Deschamps was inspired to pursue music by his father who was a musician and music teacher himself. Benjamin attended Collège Notre-Dame, where he began to play the saxophone at the age of twelve. Passionate about classical music, he furthered his musical training by enrolling in college studies in jazz music at Cégep Saint-Laurent. During his studies, he discovered a little more about the world of jazz music and saxophone and studied with Jean-Pierre Zanella. He was drawn to the creative and free side of this genre, which allowed him to improvise and play with harmonies. In 2012, he completed his bachelor's degree in jazz performance at McGill University where he learn was taught by Rémi Bolduc, Frank Lozano, Jan Jarczyk and Joe Sullivan.

After his college studies, he joined the Montreal All City Big Band from 2006 to 2010. He left the band to found the Atomic Big Band in 2010 with musicians from the Montreal emerging jazz scene. Following his graduation from McGill, Deschamps took part in the McGill Jazz Orchestra 1 tour that went to France, while also leading the Montreal All City Big Band.

In 2013, he performed with Jacques Kuba Séguin's band Odd Lot in a tour in Poland. Upon his return, he founded the Benjamin Deschamps Quartet with his friends Charles Trudel on piano, Sébastien Pellerin on double bass and Alain Bourgeois on drums. They released their first album, What Do We Know, in March 2014. Now a quintet, with the addition of Jean-Nicolas Trottier on trombone, the band released its second album, Demi-nuit, in 2017. The album was financed by the Conseil des Arts de Montréal's Jazz Creation grant, received after he obtained his master's degree in jazz performance at McGill University.

Deschamps released his third recording in 2018 with his band No Codes.

He also performs with many artists of different musical genres as a sideman. He has toured Mexico and Western Canada with Rachel Therrien's Quintet and Europe with Garou and the production Forever Gentlemen. He also played with the Ensemble Charles Trudel and the JazzLab Orchestra. He has participated in the recording of several albums, including those of Steve Hill, Damien Robitaille and Bernard Adamus.

== Discography ==
=== Lead ===
- What do we know, Benjamin Deschamps Quartet (2014)
- Demi-Nuit, Benjamin Deschamps Quintet (2017)
- No Codes, No Codes (2018)
- Augmented Reality (2021)

=== Sideman ===
- Montreal All City Big Band (2008)
- Bigras Fan, Dan Bigras (2009)
- Lulu Hughes & the Montreal all city big band (2010)
- Double Feature, McGill University Jazz Orchestra I (2012)
- La première fois, Fanfare Jarry (2014)
- Home Inspiration, Rachel Therrien Quintet (2014) - alto saxophone
- Insight Out, Vera Marijt (2015) - alto saxophone
- Fruit, Ensemble Charles Trudel (2017) - alto saxophone
- WDYT, Rachel Therrien Quintet (2017) - alto saxophone
- Ensemble de Magnac, Sebastien Bailey (2018) - alto saxophone
- Oshosi, Thomas Morelli-Bernard (2019) - soprano, alto and tenor saxophones, flute and piccolo
- Forever Overhead, Tim Baker (2019) - tenor saxophone
- C'qui nous reste du Texas, Bernard Adamus (2019)
- Marjorie Kelly, Mat Vezio (2019) - tenor and baritone saxophones
- Bientôt ce sera Noël, Damien Robitaille (2019) - baritone saxophone, clarinet, flute and piccolo
- Steve Hill and the Devil Horns, Steve Hill (2020) - tenor saxophone
- Loguslabusmuszikus, JazzLab Orchestra (2021) - tenor and soprano saxophones and flute
- Take It or Leave It, Izzo Blues Coalition (2021) - tenor and baritone saxophones

== Prizes and awards ==
- Grand Prize of the Festi Jazz de Rimouski 2013 with Benjamin Deschamps Quartet
- Jazz creation grant from the Conseil des arts de Montréal in 2016
- Révélation Radio-Canada en jazz 2017-2018
- TD Grand Jazz Award 2019 from the Festival International de Jazz de Montréal
- Prize of the JPL Victo Jazz 2019 with Benjamin Deschamps Quintet
