= Italo Moscati =

Italian writer and film director

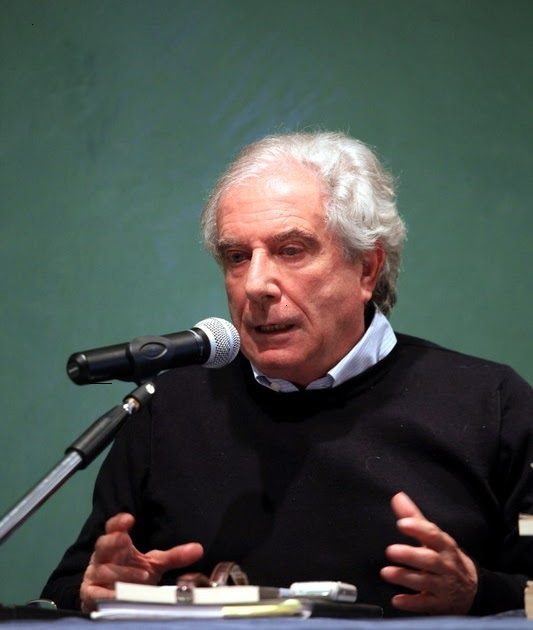
Italo Moscati

Italo Moscati (born, August 22, 1937) is an Italian writer, film director, and screenwriter. He was born in Milan and, since 1967, has lived and worked in Rome.

Moscati has collaborated with many notable figures in Italian cinema and television, including Liliana Cavani, Luigi Comencini, and Giuliano Montaldo. He is also active as a theater and film critic for numerous newspapers and magazines and is a contributor to the Italian entertainment website Cineblog.it. He was also Deputy Director of RAI Educational and, for four years, worked as president of the Center of Contemporary Art in Prato. He has written many plays staged by Ugo Gregoretti, Piero Maccarinelli and Augusto Zucchi. Among his recent books are: Pasolini e il teorema del sesso; Il cattivo Eduardo; 2001– Un’altra Odissea; and Le scarpe di Jack Kerouac.
