= Jacoba van Velde =

Dutch writer, translator and dramaturge

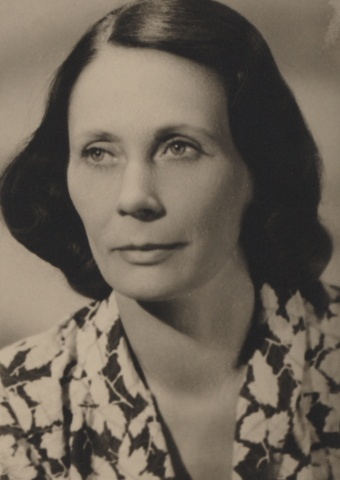
Jacoba van Velde (1945)

Jacoba van Velde (10 May 1903, in The Hague – 7 September 1985, in Amsterdam) was a Dutch writer, translator, and dramaturge. Her first novel, De grote zaal (The Great Hall), appeared in the literary journal Querido in 1953 and was translated into thirteen languages within ten years. During her life around 75,000 copies of De grote zaal were sold. In 2010, the book was chosen for the Nederland Leest (Netherlands Reads) campaign and copies were given away for free to members of all the public libraries in The Netherlands.

== Biography ==
Jacoba was the youngest of four children, with an older sister and two older brothers. Her father was often absent during her youth and her mother was a washerwoman. She only went to school until she was ten, but taught herself different languages. At age sixteen, she had already been associated with the company that would later be officially called Bouwmeester Revue for a few years as figurante and then in the dance ensemble. In 1924, she married the violinist Harry Polah; they performed in Berlin. Later, she formed a group with the male dance duo Pola Maslowa & Rabanoff. Together they went along cabarets and music halls in a large number of European countries. In 1937, she married the actor and writer Arnold (Bob) Clerx. Both marriages remained childless.

Van Velde lived a great part of her life in Paris, just like her brothers Geer van Velde and Bram van Velde, who made a name for themselves as painters after World War II. Just after the war, she was a literary agent under the name Tonny Clerx, for the French work of the Irish author Samuel Beckett. In 1947, she left that position to focus on her own writing.

Van Velde's oeuvre remained small; mostly she worked as translator and dramaturge. She translated plays by Samuel Beckett, Eugène Ionesco and Jean Genet from French to Dutch, among other things.

Her second and final novel, Een blad in de wind (A Leaf in the Wind) (1961), received less critical acclaim. Jacoba van Velde began writing a third novel, De verliezers (The Losers), but never completed it.

== Bibliography ==
- 1947 – Évasion (story)
- 1953 – De grote zaal (The Great Hall) (novel)
- 1961 – Een blad in de wind (A Leaf in the Wind) (novel)
- 1987 – Verzameld werk (Collected works) (two novels and ten stories)
