= Van der Velden =

Van der Velden is a Dutch toponymic surname meaning "from the fields". In 2007, there were over 10,000 people with this name in The Netherlands. Among variations on this name are Vandervelden (primarily in Belgium), Vander Velden, Van de Velden, Van den Velden, Van der Velde, Van de Velde, Vandervelde, Vandevelde, and Van Velden. Notable people with the surname include:

- Arie van der Velden (1881–1967), Dutch competitive sailor
- Audrey Vandervelden (born 1954), Canadian volleyball player
- Bianca van der Velden (born 1976), Dutch synchronized swimmer
- Brooke van Velden (born 1992), New Zealand politician
- Eline Van der Velden (born 1986), Dutch comedian, writer, actress and producer in England
- Hugo van der Velden (born 1963), Dutch art historian
- Johannes Joseph van der Velden (1891–1954), German Catholic theologian and Bishop of Aachen
- Junior van der Velden (born 1998), Dutch football defender
- Logan Vander Velden (born 1971), American basketball player
- Marly van der Velden (born 1988), Dutch actor and fashion designer
- Mieneke van der Velden (born 1962), Dutch gambist (viola de gamba player)
- Monique van der Velden (born 1973), Dutch figure skater
- Nick van der Velden (born 1981), Dutch football midfielder
- Niek van der Velden (born 2000), Dutch snowboarder
- Nicole van der Velden (born 1994), Aruban competitive sailor
- Petrus van der Velden (1837–1913), Dutch painter who immigrated to New Zealand in 1890
- Piet van der Velden (1899–1975), Dutch water polo player
- Sonja van der Velden (born 1976), Dutch synchronized swimmer

== See also ==
- 14664 Vandervelden, main-belt asteroid named after Erwin Rene van der Velden, Australian astrophotographer
- Deschamps, French counterpart
