= Jean Deschamps (academic) =

French university academic

Jean Deschamps (1 July 1925 - 22 February 1998) was a French university academic and honorary president of the Université de Pau et des Pays de l'Adour.

== Life ==
Born in Guimps, he joined the French Resistance aged 18, creating a group which fought on the Royan front in 1944 and was later merged into the regular 107th Infantry Regiment. After studying chemistry in Bordeaux, he became chief of works then maître de conférences at the Faculty in Rabat (Morocco). In 1961 he became a professor and later dean of that Faculty.

== Publications ==
- Deschamps, Jean (1996). Savoir et/ou pouvoir essai sur la démarche scientifico-technique (in French). Pau: Publications de l'Université de Pau (PUP). ISBN 2908930315.

== Talks ==
In 1991-1996 he produced over a hundred 60-minute cassettes recording his lectures. In 2008 the UPPA collected some of them and began numbering them and the following year they became available online.

== Sources (in French) ==
- Hommage to Jean Deschamps, by Claude Laugénie
- Conférences de Jean Deschamps on the Mission Culture scientifique et technique website of the UPPA
