= Fourdrinier =

Fourdrinier is a surname. Notable people with the surname include:

- Henry Fourdrinier (1766–1854), British inventor
- Paul Fourdrinier (1698–1758), engraver in England
- Sealy Fourdrinier (1773–1847), English paper-making entrepreneur
