= Lidia Beccaria Rolfi =

Italian teacher, writer and partisan (1925–1996)

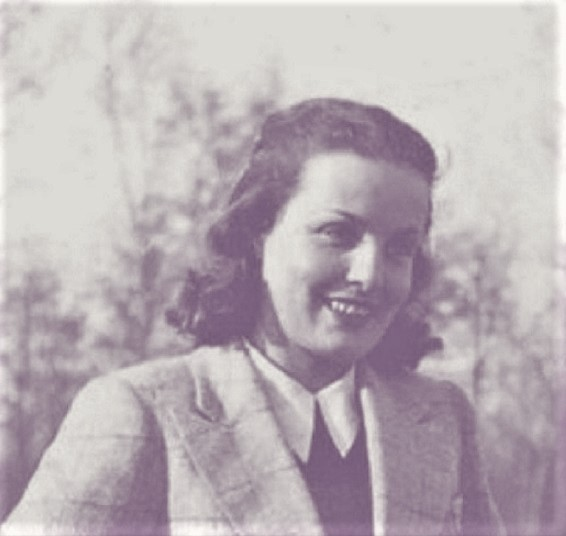
- Rolfi during the 1950s
- Born: Lidia Beccaria; 8 April 1925; Mondovì, Kingdom of Italy
- Died: 17 January 1996 (aged 70); Mondovì, Italy
- Education: University of Turin
- Occupations: Teacher; writer
- Spouse: Giorgio Rolfi
- Children: 1
- Military career
- Allegiance: Italian resistance
- Nickname: Maestrina Rossana
- Units: 11th Division Garibaldi, 15th Brigade "Saluzzo"
- Conflict: Italian Civil War

Lidia Beccaria Rolfi (née Beccaria; 8 April 1925 – 17 January 1996) was an Italian elementary school teacher, writer, diarist, partisan and Socialist Party politician. A member of the Italian resistance, Beccaria was arrested by the National Republican Guard and later deported to Ravensbrück concentration camp by the Gestapo. In 1978, Beccaria co-authored the first Italian-language book about the deportation of Italian women to concentration camps in Nazi Germany.

== Early life and education ==
Beccaria was born Lida Beccaria on 8 April 1925 in Mondovì to a peasant farming family. The youngest of five, Beccaria was the only one of her siblings to continue her education. Completing her teacher training in 1943, Beccaria began teaching at an elementary school in the village of Torrette di Casteldelfino in the Varaita Valley.

== Italian resistance ==
By the time of the Armistice of Cassibile on 3 September 1943, Beccaria had made contact with the Italian resistance. On 3 December 1943, Beccaria joined the 15th Brigade "Saluzzo" of the 11th Division Garibaldi as a partisan courier. Adopting the nom de guerre "Maestrina Rossana", Beccaria worked to maintain contact between the "Saluzzo" and the Varaita Valley, collected money for Jewish families in hiding and made grenades.

On 13 March 1944, (Note: Also cited as 13 April 1944.) Beccaria was arrested in the village where she worked by the National Republican Guard and taken to the “Hotel zum Engel” in Sampeyre. There Beccaria was interrogated and tortured for a day and a night, before being handed over to the Gestapo in Cuneo. Initially held in Saluzzo, Beccaria was soon transferred to the New Prison in Turin. Held there for two months, Beccaria shared a prison cell with Anna Segre Levi, the grandmother of her fellow partisan Isacco Levi.

=== Ravensbrück ===
On 27 June 1944, (Note: Also cited as being the night of 25/26 June.) Beccaria and 13 other female prisoners were loaded into a cattle wagon under the pretense of being sent to "work" in Germany. Travelling via Bolzano, on the evening of 30 June the train arrived at Fürstenberg station in the small town of Fürstenberg near Berlin. Forced to march the four kilometers to Ravensbrück concentration camp by the SS, Beccaria and the 13 other prisoners were the first group of Italian political deportees to be interned at the camp. In October, Beccaria Rolfi was assigned to carry out forced labour at the neighboring Siemens & Halske factory. Managing to steal paper from the factory, as well as sourcing a pencil stub through her fellow prisoners, Beccaria fashioned small notebooks she named "my diary" (Italian: il mio diario).

Beccaria recorded her own personal experiences, as well as poems by Dante, Carducci, Gozzano, and Pascoli which she wrote from memory. The diaries also served a communal purpose, with basic glossaries of German and French words and French-language poems by inmates, including Charlotte Delbo, used to teach Beccaria French.

On 26 April 1945, the SS forced the prisoners at Ravensbrück on a death march. Liberated by the Red Army on 30 April, Beccaria was later sent to a displaced persons camp in Lübeck. Beccaria, as a former political deportee, was viewed with contempt and denied access to Red Cross parcels.

== Post-war ==
Repatriated on 1 September 1945, Beccaria faced discrimination from both her fellow partisans and wider Italian society. As a former political deportee Beccaria faced suspicion of being a collaborator and the stereotype of having been sexually exploited by her Nazi captors; and her contributions to the resistance were ignored. Prevented from returning to her former school by a superintendent with fascist sympathies, Beccaria earned a teaching degree from the University of Turin and was later able to return to teaching.

=== Public testimony ===
On 4 and 5 December 1959, Beccaria spoke publicly about Ravensbrück for the first time at a touring exhibition by the Museo della Deportazione in Turin. By the end of the month Beccaria published her first testimony in Il Giorno. During the 1960s, Beccaria began working with the Institute of the History of Resistance in Cuneo, the National Association Partisans of Italy and the International Ravensbrück Committee. Beccaria also gave educational tours of concentration camps, and worked to bring the experiences of survivors into the public consciousness. A member of the Socialist Party, Beccaria served as the deputy mayor and councilor for Mondovì.

In 1964, Beccaria was interviewed by Liliana Cavani, who later released the 1974 film The Night Porter, for the 1965 documentary Women in the Resistance (Italian: La donna nella Resistenza). In multiple interviews and the preface to the screenplay of The Night Porter, Cavani detailed how she had taken inspiration for the film from an unnamed concentration camp survivor. The scholar Giovanni Miglianti posits that the film was greatly inspired by Beccaria's testimony, particulaty Cavani's interpretation of Beccaria's annual visit to Ravensbrück as being sexual in nature. Miglianti further posits that Beccaria's 1978 work Le donne di Ravensbrück. Testimonianze di deportate politiche Italiane, co-written with Anna Maria Bruzzone and the first Italian-language book about the deportation of Italian women to concentration camps, could be interpreted as an attempt by Beccaria to both reclaim her story and to disavow the sexual stereotypes of former female political deportees.

In 2021, the Saluzzo civil library was renamed after Beccaria.

== Personal life ==
Upon her return to Italy, Beccaria married Giorgio Rolfi with whom she had one son.

On 17 January 1996, Beccaria died in Mondovì aged 70.

== Publications ==
- Rolfi, Lidia Beccaria; Bruzzone, Anna Maria (1978). Le donne di Ravensbrück. Testimonianze di deportate politiche Italiane [Women of Ravensbrück. Testimonies of Italian Political Deportees]. Torino: Einaudi.
- Rolfi, Lidia Beccaria (1996). L’esile filo della memoria. Ravensbrück, 1945: un drammatico ritorno alla libertà [The Thin Thread of Memory. Ravensbrück, 1945: A dramatic return to freedom]. Torino: Einaudi. ISBN 9788806139575.
