= Ann Swaine =

British writer and a suffragist

- Born: <1821; Birstall, England
- Died: 21 June 1883; York, England

Ann Swaine (<1821 – 21 June 1883) was a British writer and a suffragist concerned with improving the higher education of women.

== Life ==
Swaine was born in Birstall in Yorkshire and she was baptised in 1821. She was the first child of Edward and Martha (born Sykes) Swaine. She was involved in her local school; the Unitarian Sunday School and she was the honorary secretary of the Yorkshire Ladies' Educational Association. This association was established in 1825 by women to support other women living in poor industrial conditions. The association was still in operation in 2017. She wanted the law to change so married women might have their own possessions and all could be educated in universities. She was a member of the Ladies' Council of Education of Yorkshire.

In 1849 her father published a pamphlet based on a lecture title The Political Franchise: A Public Trust. He argued the case for universal suffrage for men, but he excluded women from his ambitions.

She translated a theological work by Albert Réville from French. It was titled History of the Doctrine of the Deity of Jesus Christ and it was published in 1870. In the 1881 census she described herself as having "no proper trade or profession".

In 1882 the Sunday School Association published her book Remarkable Women as Examples for Girls which included biographies of notable women. The book included the biographies of Mary Carpenter, Caroline Herschel, Harriet Martineau, Charlotte Brontë and other role models.

Swaine died unmarried in York in 1883. Her father survived her. She had cared for him for 28 years. The Englishwoman's Review commented after her death on how Swaine's writing showed her pragmatism and common sense.
