= François-Michel-Chrétien Deschamps =

French playwright

François-Michel-Chrétien Deschamps (1683, near Troyes, Champagne – 10 November 1747, Paris) was an 18th-century French playwright.

A cavalry lieutenant, later employed in finance, Deschamps wrote several tragedies, of which one, Caton d’Utique (1715), was successful; the others - Antiochus et Cléopâtre (1717), Artaxerxès (1735), Méduse (1739) - were not.

Deschamps also wrote Recherches sur le théâtre français (1735, 3 vol. in-8°).

== Sources ==
- Gustave Vapereau, Dictionnaire universel des littératures, Paris, Hachette, 1876, (p. 613)
