= Jürgen Van der Velde =

Belgian footballer

Personal information
- Full name: Jürgen Niko Johan Van der Velde
- Date of birth: 9 February 1977 (age 49)
- Place of birth: Brussels, Belgium
- Height: 1.88 m (6 ft 2 in)
- Position: Goalkeeper

Youth career
- K.R.C. Mechelen
- K. Londerzeel S.K.

Senior career*
Years	Team	Apps	(Gls)
1995–1999	R.W.D. Molenbeek	5	(0)
1999–2001	RFC Athois		
2003–2004	FC Beringen		
2004–2005	Bocholter VV		
2005–2006	FC Rhodienne		
2009–2012	KOVC Sterrebeek		
2012–2014	FC Pepingen		

International career^{‡}
1996–1998	Belgium U21	6	(0)
- * Club domestic league appearances and goals as of 6 February 2017 ‡ National team caps and goals as of 6 February 2017

Jürgen Van der Velde is a Belgian football adviser and former professional football player who played as a goalkeeper.

== Club career ==
Jurgen played professionally for R.W.D. Molenbeek in Belgium from 1995 til 1999. His professional career was cut short by a severe injury, but he continued to play in Belgian amateur divisions until the age of 37.

== International career ==
He got several caps for the Belgium national under-21 football team. He also played for his country's B-squad.

== Professional life ==
Van der Velde learned the Chinese Mandarin language and worked as an entrepreneur and for many years. In 2017 he started working as a football consultant and ambassador.
