= Henri Décamps =

French biologist (born 1935)

Henri Décamps, born on 18 December 1935 in Paris, is a French biologist specialising in the ecology of rivers and river landscapes. He has been a member of the French Academy of sciences since 2008 (correspondent in 1993), of the Académie d'agriculture de France since 2004 (correspondent in 1998) and a member of Academia Europaea since 2009.

== Biography ==
Student at the Lycée Lapérouse in Albi, he obtained a degree in natural sciences and a diploma of advanced studies in hydrobiology at the Faculty of Sciences of the University of Toulouse. He was appointed a researcher at the Centre national de la recherche scientifique (CNRS) in 1961. He was awarded the title of emeritus in 2001 and is attached to the Functional Ecology and Environment Laboratory (ECOLAB).

== Scientific work ==
Henri Décamps first worked on the ecology of aquatic insects of the order Trichoptera, highlighting the influence of the vegetation cover of drainage basins on the diversity of aquatic fauna in mountain streams in the Pyrenees. He then participated in the study of planktonic algal blooms in the Lot River, and identified the causes and consequences of this phenomenon. This work led him to launch two cooperative projects: "large rivers" within the framework of PIREN (CNRS's Environmental Research Programme) and "ecotones" within the framework of UNESCO's Man and Biosphere (MAB) programme. In 1980, he was appointed Director of the CNRS Vegetation Map Service, with the mission of developing this service laboratory into an ecological research laboratory. He then created a team on the study of riverside corridors, in collaboration with the University of Washington in Seattle. This approach has led to several publications on the structure and functioning of river ecosystems. It demonstrates the importance of riparian areas as an interface for exchanges between running water ecosystems and neighbouring terrestrial ecosystems, leading to a better understanding of the dynamics of riparian vegetation cover, the decomposition of their litter and their role in recycling carbon and nitrogen into floodplains. These results have played an important role in the development of two key concepts in landscape ecology: the concepts of corridor and connectivity, which are particularly used in conservation biology. In his book "Ecologie du paysage", written with Odile Décamps, he presents a synthesis of advances in landscape ecology and introduces the notion of Panarchy and sketches a synthesis between multiple approaches to landscape (in particular that of landscape ecologists in relation to that of landscape ecology).

Elected to the French Academy of sciences, Henri Décamps directed a report on extreme weather events, which led him to participate in the drafting of the IPCC special report on this issue. His most recent work focuses on issues related to the development of scientific ecology.

== Other functions and offices ==
Henri Décamps was a member of the National Committee for Scientific Research at the CNRS. He has chaired various research committees within the framework of the environmental programmes of the CNRS, the Ministry of the Environment and UNESCO. He also chaired the International Association for Landscape Ecology (IALE), the Scientific Council of the Adour-Garonne Basin Committee and the Public Interest Group "Forest Ecosystems - GIP ECOFOR".

== Distinctions ==
- Winner of the Memorial Baldi
- Reading of the International Society of Limnology
- Gold medal from the University of Prague
- Honorary Member of the American Society of Ecology
- Chevalier of the Legion d'Honneur and of the Ordre national du Mérite
- Officier of the Palmes Académiques

The Sénouillac school in the Tarn has been named after him since 2014 and the collège des Trois Vallées in Salies du Salat, Haute-Garonne, adopted him as the sponsor of its "La Main à la pâte" school project in 2018.
