= Francis Swaine =

British painter

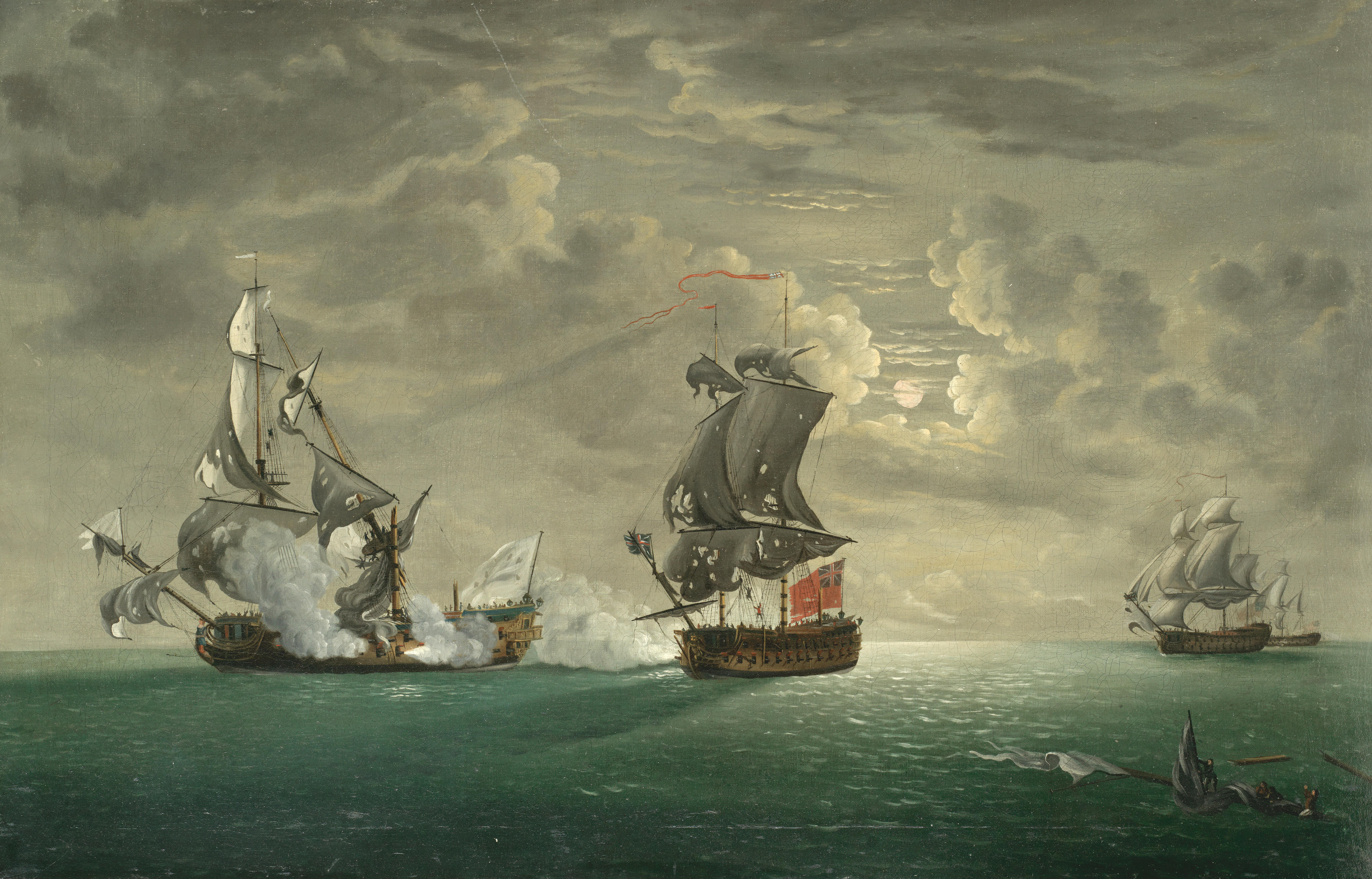
The Capture of the 'Foudroyant', 84 guns, by the 'Monmouth', 64 guns, 28 February 1758. Painting by F. Swaine. National Maritime Museum, London. "The Moonlight Battle"

Francis Swaine (1725–1782) was a British marine painter.

== Early life ==
He was born in 1725, and christened on 7 October of that year at St Dunstan's, Stepney, London. His parents were named Francis Swaine and Ann Joel. In 1735 the elder Francis Swaine, the marine painter's father, applied in writing to the Commissioners of His Majesty's Navy for employment as a Navy Messenger, in succession to Mr William Wyatt. He mentions that he had served "upwards of twenty eight years" in the Navy, and that his father had died Purser of the Royal Katherine. He mentions also that he had carried out "little labours in drawing", and that he at that time had five small children. The first-born of these children was the Francis Swaine who became the marine painter. The elder Swaine was duly employed as a Navy Messenger. He served for 20 years and died on 10 October 1755, aged 64.

== Career ==
Swaine is said to have been influenced by the style of van de Velde. There is no clear evidence of this alleged influence. The suggestion that Swaine may have been a pupil of Charles Brooking can be dismissed, as the difference in age between the two painters was a mere two years, and there is no visual evidence to support any such influence. On the other hand, Swaine was demonstrably strongly influenced by the style of the painter Peter Monamy (1681–1749), whose pupil he was. In the will of Sir Samuel Young (1766–1826), son of Admiral Sir George Young (1732–1810), Francis Swaine is explicitly referred to as "Old Swaine, pupil of Monami". In Mark Noble's Biographical History of England, 1806, under the entry for Monamy, it is also stated that "Swaine, of Stretton Ground, Westminster, his disciple, and bred under him, was an excellent painter of moon-light pieces." This remark is well confirmed by his "Capture of the Foudroyant" (see illustration), which is also referred to in at least one source (David Erskine) as "The Moonlight Battle". The French ship subsequently served in the English Fleet as the Foudroyant.

== Family ==
Swaine married Monamy's daughter Mary at Allhallows, London Wall, on 29 June 1749, when he was aged 24. Their children were christened Anna Maria Swaine, on 27 Jan 1750/51; and Monamy Swaine, christened on 27 Feb 1753, both at St Dunstan's church in Stepney. Monamy Swaine also became a marine painter. Francis Swaine was a popular artist of his time and regularly displayed works at the Society of Artists of Great Britain and the Free Society of Artists. He died in 1782. Today, several of his works are held in the National Maritime Museum in London.
