= Geer van Velde =

Dutch painter (1898–1977)

- Born: Gerardus van Velde; 5 April 1898; Lisse, Netherlands
- Died: 5 March 1977 (aged 78); Cachan, France
- Known for: Painter

Gerardus "Geer" van Velde (5 April 1898, Lisse – 5 March 1977, Cachan, Paris) was a Dutch painter.

== Biography ==
Van Velde was the second son of Willem Adriaan van Velde, then owner of a small case of inland waterway transport fuelwood and charcoal on the Rhine and Hendrika Catharina von der Voorst, illegitimate daughter of an earl. Catharina and her four children (Neeltje, Bram, Geer, and Jacoba) were abandoned by Willem Adriaan after the bankruptcy of his business, leaving them in misery. Moving frequently, they eventually settled in The Hague in 1903. In 1910, at the age of twelve, Geer became an apprentice designer in the firm with Schaijk & Eduard H. Kramers. Kramers encouraged Geer and his brother Bram van Velde to develop their interest in painting and funded both to a certain degree. The brothers moved to Paris; their experience of the 1925 Arts Décoratifs exhibition had motivated the move. Geer rented his own studio in 1926.

He had a close relationship to writer Samuel Beckett; their common friend, art patron Peggy Guggenheim, suggested it was a homoerotic relationship. Beckett bought some of van Velde's paintings and wrote about them.

== Literature ==
Germain Viatte: Geer Van Velde. Cahiers d’Art, 1989.
