= Charles Brooking =

English painter (c.1723–1759)

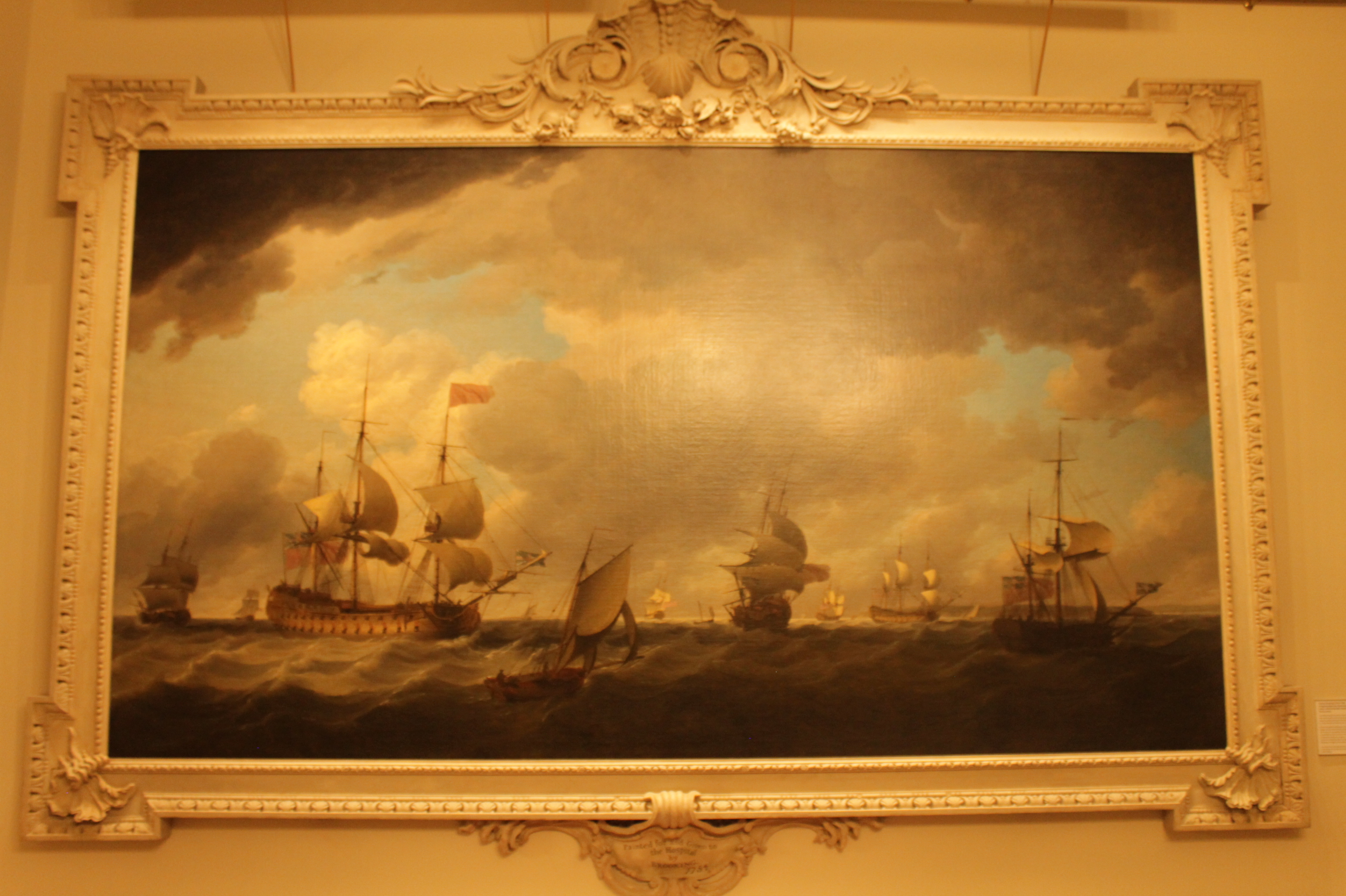
A Flagship Before the Wind under Easy Sail by Charles Brooking 1745

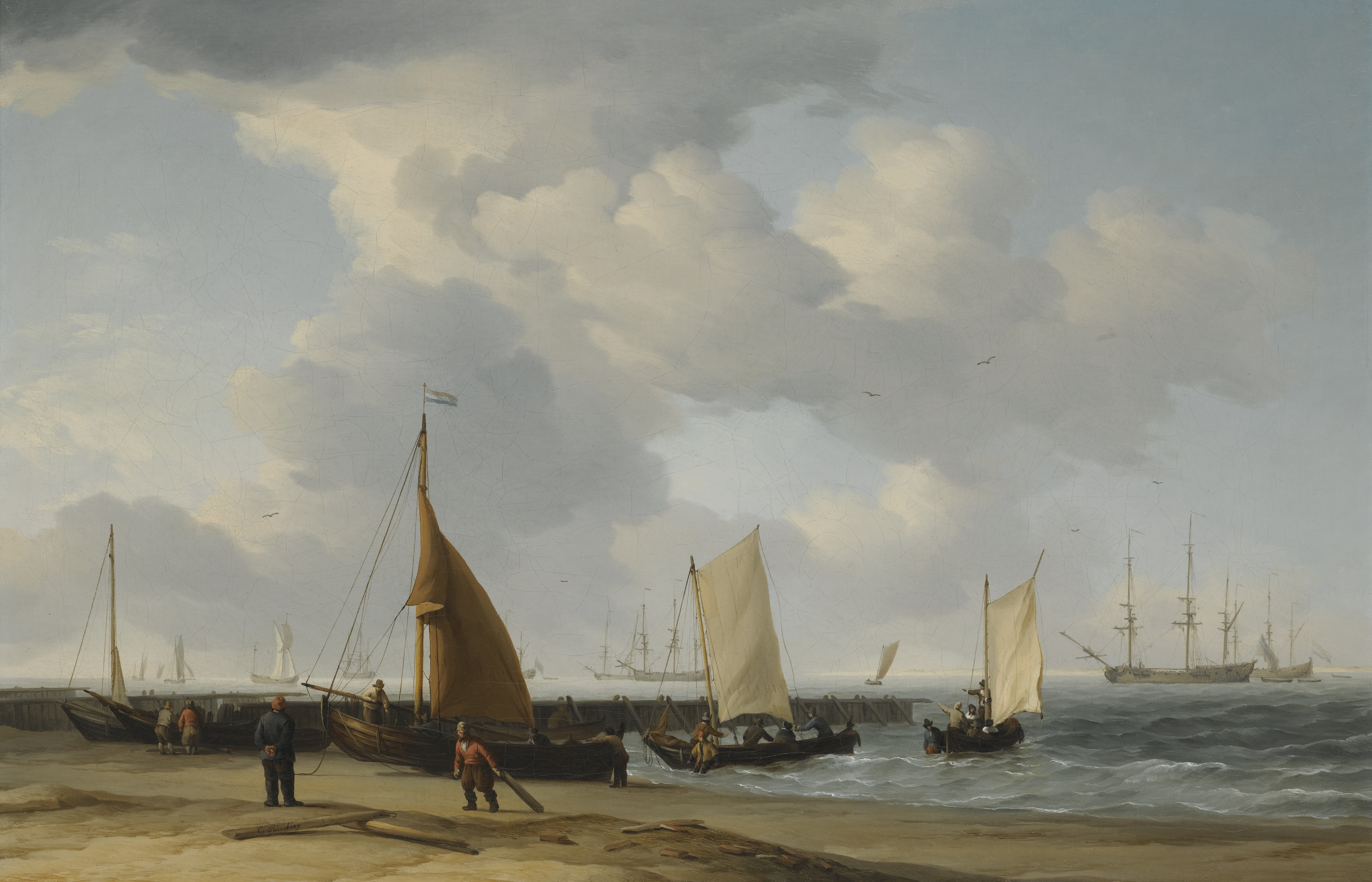
A Dutch Beach Scene with a Man-of-War in the Distance

Charles Brooking (c. 1723 –1759) was an English painter of marine scenes.

== Life ==
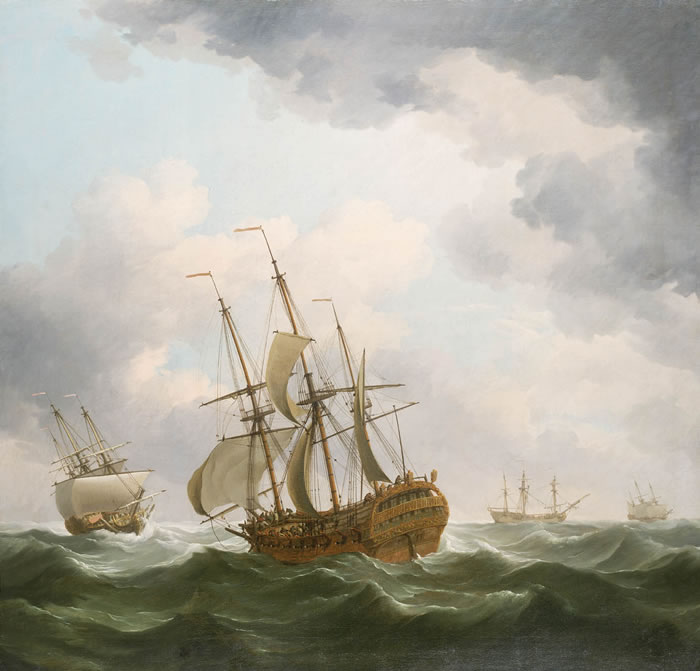
East Indiamen in a Gale, 45 x 48 inches, signed by Charles Brooking, c. 1759. National Maritime Museum.

It is highly probable that Brooking’s father was a Charles Brooking (1677–1738) who was recorded as employed by Greenwich Hospital (London) between 1729 and 1736 as a painter and decorator. Charles Brooking senior had earlier been active in Plymouth and Dublin where he is recorded as working on Trinity College Dublin in 1723-25. He also produced one of the earliest dedicated maps of Dublin which was published in London in 1728.

On 27 November 1732, "Master Charles Brooking" was recorded as an apprentice, one of two taken on by Brooking senior on that date.

An anecdote related by the marine artist Dominic Serres about Brooking is that he worked for a picture dealer in Leicester Square, London, who exploited him until his “discovery” by Taylor White, the Treasurer of the Foundling Hospital in London.

A Flagship Before the Wind, 14 x 40 inches (1754)

Brooking became much more widely known in 1754, when as a result of his “discovery” he was commissioned by the Foundling Hospital to paint what is now titled A Flagship Before the Wind Under Easy Sail, following which he was elected a Governor and Guardian of the institution. This painting is a huge sea piece intended to "match" another painting, whereabouts unknown, said to be of a “Fleet in the Downs”, by Peter Monamy.

It is claimed that Dominic Serres received some instruction for a short time from Brooking. It has also been suggested that Francis Swaine was another pupil, but the age difference between the two painters was a mere two years, and there is no visual evidence that Swaine followed Brooking’s manner.

Brooking is said to have died of consumption on 25 March 1759, reportedly leaving his family destitute.

== Work ==
Brooking's earliest known works are two pictures, one depicting a moonlit harbour scene and the other a burning ship, which he signed and inscribed with his age, 17, and thus datable to 1740. Since he was described as a "celebrated painter of sea-pieces" in 1752, when he worked for John Ellis (c.1710–76), he had evidently been producing work for at least 12 years before that date. The mention by Ellis occurs in his Natural History of the Corallines, published in London in 1755. Ellis employed Brooking as a botanical draughtsman. An example of earlier work by Brooking is his painting of an engagement between Commodore Walker and a fleet of French ships which occurred on 23 May 1745, which was engraved and published by Boydell in 1753. This painting is now in the Greenwich Maritime Museum.

Except for paintings such as this, which record specific historical events, Brooking’s early works are not easy to date more precisely, other than stylistically and by theme, and have not yet been closely examined for their chronological development. His first two pictures show some influence of Peter Monamy, but he was already displaying strong signs of a distinctive personal manner. He soon drew away from the native traditions of the marine genre, which included formal ship portraiture, although there are at least two works signed by him, one now in the Maritime Museum at Greenwich, which portray a ship in this convention. There is also a group of paintings and prints, signed or inscribed "Monamy" and datable to the years circa 1745-1750, but whose style is more consistent with Brooking’s. Some of the identical prints occur with attributions by different print dealers to both painters in separate issues.

Brooking’s accuracy and exceptionally careful attention to detail manifest his intimate knowledge of maritime practice and naval architecture, as well as his remarkably close observation of the ocean conditions of wave and wind. Contemporary accounts suggest that he had been “much at sea” and he certainly owned a small yacht. In his early years he was evidently employed in some maritime capacity, possibly in a pilot boat at Gravesend. Some of his presumed later works plainly show the influence of Willem van de Velde the Younger.

The National Maritime Museum in Greenwich, London holds 23 of his oil paintings, a complete set of 28 engravings after his works, and 4 drawings bequeathed by the U.S. President, J.F.Kennedy. A plaque to Brooking was unveiled by the Lord Mayor of the City of London at Tokenhouse Yard in October, 2008.

== Bibliography ==
- John Ellis. A Natural History of the Corallines (1755).
- Edward Edwards. Anecdotes of Painters (1808).
- Colin Sorensen. Charles Brooking 1723 -1759 (Aldeburgh and Bristol Exhibition Catalogue, 1966).
- Benedict Nicolson. The Treasures of the Foundling Hospital (OUP, 1972).
- David Joel & James Taylor. Charles Brooking (1723-59) and the 18th Century Marine Painters (Antique Collectors Club, 1999). ISBN 978-1-85149-277-0
- David Joel. The Call of the Sea: Peter Monamy, Charles Brooking and the early British marine painters (catalogue for an exhibition mounted at the St Barbe Museum and Art Gallery, Lymington, Hampshire, England, 13 August – 17 October 2009). ISBN 978-0-9559729-1-1
