= Nicolas Deschamps (writer) =

French Jesuit and writer (1797–1872)

- Born: 1797; Villefranche, Rhône, France
- Died: 1872 (aged 74–75); Aix-en-Provence
- Occupation: Jesuit writer
- Known for: Les Sociétés secrètes

Nicolas Deschamps (born at Villefranche, Rhône, France, 1797; died at Aix-en-Provence, 1872) was a French Jesuit controversial writer.

== Life ==
He entered the Society of Jesus in 1826; taught literature and rhetoric in several colleges and wrote extensively.

== Works ==
Apart from a few didactic and devotional books, like "Cours élémentaire de littérature" (Avignon, 1860) and "Les fleurs de Marie" (Paris, 1863), his works are largely polemical. They and bear on burning questions of politics and religion in the France of his day: the educational monopoly of the University of France; the state faculties of theology; the Organic Articles; liberty of association; Communism; the issue of paganism in classical education.

The best-known of Deschamps's works is Les Sociétés secrètes, a work of conspiracy theory published after the author's death (Avignon, 1874–1876), re-edited and brought up to date by Claudio Janet (Paris, 1880 and 1881). In it, Deschamps characterized European Freemasonry as a baneful force working to harm religion, the social order, patriotism, and morality. He blamed it for the July Revolution and the French Revolution of 1848, and purported to trace its origins back to Manichæism.
