= Van de Velde =

Van de Velde, Vande Velde, or Vandevelde is a Dutch toponymic surname meaning "from the field". Van de Velde is the 32nd most common name in Belgium, with 8,903 people in 2008, while in 2007 there were 3,319 people named "Van de Velde" in The Netherlands. Among other variations on this name are Van der Velde, Vandevelde, Van Velde, Van de Velden, and Van der Velden.

== Artists ==
- Peter van de Velde (1503–1586), Flemish painter born Pieter de Kempeneer and a.k.a. Pedro Campaña (each: "Peter of the Field")
- Esaias van de Velde (1587–1630), Dutch landscape painter
- Jan van de Velde the Elder or I (1568–1623), Dutch engraver
- Jan van de Velde II (1593–1641), Dutch engraver and painter; son of Jan I, cousin of Esias
- Jan Jansz van de Velde III (1620–1662), Dutch still life painter; son of the above
- Willem van de Velde, the elder (c. 1611–1693), Dutch seascape painter; no relation to the above
- Willem van de Velde, the younger (1633–1707), Dutch marine painter; son of Willem the Elder
- Adriaen van de Velde (1636–1672), Dutch animal and landscape painter; son of Willem the Elder
- Peter van de Velde (1634 – after 1723), Flemish marine painter
- Charles William Meredith van de Velde (1818–1898), Dutch Lieutenant-at-sea and painter
- Henry van de Velde (1863–1957), Belgian painter, architect and interior designer
- Wannes Van de Velde (1937–2008), Flemish singer and poet

== Film ==
- Jean van de Velde (b. 1957), Dutch film director, father of Yannick van de Velde
- Yannick van de Velde (b. 1989), Dutch actor, son of Jean van de Velde

== Sports ==
- Chris VandeVelde (b. 1987), American ice hockey player
- Christian Vande Velde (b. 1976), American cyclist, son of John Vande Velde
- Darryl Van de Velde (1951–2024), Australian rugby league footballer, coach and administrator
- Jean van de Velde (b. 1966), French golfer
- John Vande Velde (b. 1948), American cyclist
- Julie Van de Velde (born 1993), Belgian racing cyclist
- Rita Van De Velde (born 1941), Belgian gymnast
- Steven van de Velde (b. 1994), Dutch beach volleyball player and convicted child rapist
- Tim Van de Velde (born 2000), Belgian athlete

== Writers ==
- Philippe Vandevelde (1957–2019), Belgian comics writer
- Roger van de Velde (1925–1970), Belgian writer
- Vivian Vande Velde (b. 1951), American author

== Others ==
- Abraham Momber van de Velde (fl. 1705–1710), last Dutch governor of Mauritius
- James van de Velde, former Yale University lecturer and a figure in the 1998 Suzanne Jovin case
- James Oliver Van de Velde (1795–1855), Roman Catholic Bishop of Chicago
- Theodoor Hendrik van de Velde (1873–1937), Dutch physician and gynæcologist

== See also ==
- Van de Velde N.V., Belgian lingerie company
- Duchamp (surname), French counterpart
- Del Campo (surname), Spanish counterpart
