= List of people from Italy =

This is a list of notable individuals from the geographic region of Italy, distinguished by their connection to the nation through residence in the region or legal status there. They are categorized based on their specific areas of achievement and prominence.

== Acting ==
- Jeff Cameron (1932–1985) actor
- Stefano Accorsi (born 1971)
- Henry Armetta (1888–1945), character actor
- Roberto Benigni (born 1952), Oscar-winning actor, comedian, screenwriter, and director
- Rossano Brazzi (1916–1994)
- Lando Buzzanca (1935–2022), theatrical, film, and television actor
- Mario Carotenuto (1916–1995), actor of film and theatre
- Nino Castelnuovo (1936–2021). Most famous for playing opposite Catherine Deneuve in the 1964 film Les Parapluies de Cherbourg and in Italy, for his lead performance in the popular 1967 RAI TV mini-series I Promessi Sposi.
- Tino Caspanello (born 1983), actor, playwright, director, and set designer
- Sergio Castellitto (born 1953), Italian actor, film director, screenwriter
- Pietro Castellitto (born 1991), actor, filmmaker
- Adolfo Celi (1922–1986), actor and director, played Emilio Largo in the 1965 James Bond film Thunderball
- Gino Cervi (1901–1974), actor and manager
- Walter Chiari (1924–1991), stage and screen actor
- Eduardo De Filippo (1900–1984), playwright and actor
- Manuel De Peppe (born 1970), actor, singer, arranger, music producer, composer, pianist, and drummer
- Sergio Franchi (1926–1999), film actor and singer
- Vittorio Gassman (1922–2000), film and theatre actor and director
- Elio Germano (born 1980), actor who won the Best Actor Award at the Cannes Film Festival in 2010.
- Giancarlo Giannini (born 1942), actor and dubber
- Terence Hill (born 1939), actor, who became famous for playing in Italian western movies (also known as Spaghetti Westerns).
- Roberto Lamarca (1959–2017), actor migrated to Venezuela. He is most recognised for his portrayal of Arístides Valerio, on the RCTV telenovela Por estas calles.
- Nino Manfredi (1921–2004), one of the most prominent actors in the commedia all'italiana genre.
- Marcello Mastroianni (1924–1996), actor who became the preeminent leading man in Italian cinema during the 1960s.
- Aldo Monti (1929–2016), actor migrated in Venezuela and Mexico
- Amedeo Nazzari (1907–1979), actor.
- Alberto Sordi (1920–2003), actor. Depicted the vices, virtues, and foibles of post-World War II Italy in a long career of mostly comic films.
- Giorgio Strehler (1921–1997), actor and theatre director, founder of the Piccolo Teatro di Milano
- Ugo Tognazzi (1922–1990), film and theatre actor
- Totò, born Antonio de Curtis (1898–1967), actor
- Massimo Troisi (1953–1994), actor and director
- Rudolph Valentino (1895–1926), actor
- Raf Vallone (1916–2002), actor, footballer, and journalist
- Carlo Verdone (born 1950), actor, screenwriter and film director
- Gian Maria Volonté (1933–1994), actor. Known outside of Italy for his roles in A Fistful of Dollars (1964) and For a Few Dollars More (1965)
- Luca Zingaretti (born 1961), actor and film director, known for playing Salvo Montalbano in the Inspector Montalbano series
- Marta Abba (1900–1988) actress
- Pier Angeli (1932–1971), Golden Globe-winning television and film actress who starred in American, British and European films
- Laura Antonelli (1941–2015), actress
- Asia Argento (born 1975), actress, singer, model, and director
- Monica Bellucci (born 1964), actress and fashion model
- Francesca Bertini, silent film actress
- Nicoletta Braschi (born 1960), actress and producer, best known for her work with her husband, actor and director Roberto Benigni
- Clara Calamai (1909–1998), actress, known for playing Carlo's mother, the female lead in Luchino Visconti's Ossessione (1943).
- Claudia Cardinale (1938-2025), actress
- Chiara Caselli (born 1967), actress
- Valentina Cortese (1923–2019), actress
- Eleonora Duse (1858–1924), actress, especially noted for her roles in Henrik Ibsen's plays.
- Valeria Golino (born 1966), film and television actress. Known to English language audiences for the 1988 film Rain Man, and the Hot Shots! films.
- Virna Lisi (1936–2014), actress, winner of Cannes and César awards.
- Gina Lollobrigida (1927–2023), actress. One of the first European sex symbols in the post-World War II era.
- Sophia Loren, actress. Her performance in the film Two Women (1960) won her the Academy Award for Best Actress, making her the first actor to win an Oscar for a non-English-language performance.
- Anna Magnani (1908–1973), actress. She was nominated twice for an Academy Award for best actress, winning the Oscar in 1955 for her role in The Rose Tattoo.
- Silvana Mangano (1930–1989), actress
- Elsa Martinelli (1935–2017), actress and fashion model
- Giulietta Masina (1921–1994), actress
- Mariangela Melato (1941–2013), actress
- Sandra Milo, actress
- Aldo Monti (1929–2016), actor. He migrated to Venezuela in 1947 and then to Mexico in 1957
- Ornella Muti (born 1955), actress
- Wanda Osiris (1905–1994), actress, revue soubrette, and singer
- Rosanna Schiaffino (1939–2009), actress
- Alida Valli (1921–2006), actress
- Monica Vitti (1931–2022), actress
- Lorenzo Zurzolo (born 2000), actor
- Slut Boy Billy (born 1998), actor

== Architects ==
=== Ancient Rome ===
- Cocceius Auctus, Roman architect during the age of Augustus
- Lucius Vitruvius Cordo, Roman architect; known for his work Arco dei Gavi
- Hyginus Gromaticus, Roman surveyor under the reign of Trajan
- Rabirius, Roman architect active during the reign of Domitian
- Vitruvius, Roman writer, architect and engineer; author of De architectura, regarded as the oldest surviving text on the history of architecture

=== Middle Ages ===
- Guglielmo Agnelli (c. 1238–1313), sculptor and architect. He built the campanile of the Badia a Settimo.
- Pietro Baseggio (14th century), architect and sculptor. In 1361, he was named superintendent of construction for the Doge's palace.
- Bartolomeo Bon (died after 1464), sculptor and architect. Among his works are Gothic Ca' d'Oro (1424–1430) and the marble door of the church of Frari.
- Bertolino Bragerio (active c. 1288), builder of the cathedral of Cremona.
- Jacopo Celega (d. 1386), architect. Around 1330 he took over construction of the church of Frari.
- Diotisalvi (12th century), architect
- Maginardo (fl. 1006–1032), architect active in the Diocese of Arezzo
- Lorenzo Maitani (c. 1275–1330), architect and sculptor; primarily responsible for the construction and decoration of the façade of Orvieto Cathedral.

=== Renaissance ===
- Leon Battista Alberti (1404–1472), artist, architect and theoretician. He wrote De Re Aedificatoria in 1452; was the first architectural treatise of the Renaissance.
- Galeazzo Alessi (1512–1572), architect. His main works are the church Santa Maria Assunta di Carignano, the Marino Palace (started in 1557) and the Parodi Palace (1567).
- Donato Bramante (1444–1514), architect. Under the patronage of Pope Julius II, he drew up the new St. Peter's Basilica.
- Filippo Brunelleschi (1377–1446), architect. His major work is the dome of the Florence Cathedral (1420–1436).
- Bernardo Buontalenti (c. 1531–1608), architect, engineer, designer, painter and inventor. He was one of the great Renaissance polymaths.
- Giacomo della Porta (c. 1533–1602), architect whose work represents the development in style from late Mannerism to early Baroque.
- Giovanni Maria Falconetto (1468–1535), architect and painter. Examples of his work include the Porta San Giovanni and the Porta Savonarola, two gates to the city of Padua.
- Filarete (c. 1400– c. 1469), architect, sculptor and writer. He wrote an important treatise, Libro architettonico (1464), defending the principles of ancient architecture.
- Domenico Fontana (1543–1607), architect who worked on St. Peter's Basilica and other famous buildings of Rome and Naples.
- Francesco di Giorgio Martini (1439–1502), architect and theoretician. His Trattato di architettura, ingegneria e arte militare (1482) is one of the most important documents of Renaissance architectural theory.
- Giacomo Andrea da Ferrara (died 1500).
- Giuliano da Maiano (c. 1432–1490), architect; made an important contribution to spreading the Renaissance style to Southern Italy.
- Giuliano da Sangallo (c. 1443–1516), sculptor, architect and military engineer; designed the Church of Santa Maria delle Carceri at Prato and palaces in Florence.
- Luciano Laurana (c. 1420–1479), principal designer of the Palazzo Ducale at Urbino and one of the main figures in 15th century Italian architecture.
- Pirro Ligorio (c. 1510–1583), architect, painter, antiquarian and garden designer, known for his designs for the Casina of Pio IV in the Vatican and his gardens for the Villa d'Este at Tivoli.
- Michelozzo (1396–1472), architect and sculptor; designed the Palazzo Medici Riccardi in Florence, which set the standard for Renaissance palace architecture in Tuscany for the next century.
- Andrea Palladio (1508–1580), architect and theoretician. His treatise I quattro libri dell’architettura (1570) made him the most influential person in the history of Western architecture.
- Baldassare Peruzzi (1481–1536), architect and painter
- Antonio da Sangallo the Elder (c. 1453–1534), architect. He executed, under the influence of Bramante, the Church of the Madonna di San Biagio (1518–consecrated 1529).
- Antonio da Sangallo the Younger (1484–1546), architect. He designed the Palazzo Farnese in Rome (1534–46); a fortress like Florentine-style palace.
- Michele Sanmicheli (1484–1559), architect, especially noted for his original treatment of military fortifications.
- Jacopo Sansovino (1486–1570), sculptor and architect. His Library of St. Mark's is one of the major architectural works of the 16th century.
- Vincenzo Scamozzi (1552–1616), architect and theoretician, author of one of the most comprehensive Renaissance treatises, the six-volume L’Idea dell’Architettura Universale (1615).
- Sebastiano Serlio (1475–1554), architect and theoretician. He is remembered primarily for his treatise Tutte l'opere d'architettura et prospetiva (eight books, 1537–1575).
- Giacomo Barozzi da Vignola (1507–1573), architect. Among his works are the Villa Farnese for Cardinal Alessandro Farnese and Villa Giulia for Pope Julius III.

=== Baroque ===
- Francesco Borromini (1599–1667), architect. His buildings include the churches of San Carlo alle Quattro Fontane (1638–1641) and Sant'Ivo alla Sapienza (1642–1660).
- Cosimo Fanzago (1591–1678), architect and sculptor; exponent of Baroque architecture in Naples
- Carlo Fontana (1634/1638–1714)
- Rosario Gagliardi (1698–1762), Sicilian Baroque architect
- Guarino Guarini (1624–1683), architect. He was one of the first to analyse with perceptivity the structure of medieval architecture, in his treatise Architettura Civile (published posthumously in 1737).
- Filippo Juvarra (1678–1736), architect, draughtsman and designer
- Baldassarre Longhena (1598–1682), architect known for the Church of Santa Maria della Salute
- Carlo Maderno (1556–1629), architect; directed the construction of St. Peter's Basilica for a time
- Pietro da Cortona (1596–1669), architect, painter and decorator known for the Church of Santi Luca e Martina
- Carlo Rainaldi (1611–1691), architect of the Church of Santa Maria in Campitelli (1663–1667)
- Francesco Bartolomeo Rastrelli (1700–1771), Baroque architect active in Russia
- Vincenzo Sinatra (1720–1765), architect. Following the 1693 Noto earthquake, Sinatra was responsible for many of the new buildings in the new city of Noto.
- Nicola Salvi (1697–1751), architect known for the Trevi Fountain.
- Giovanni Battista Vaccarini (1702–1768), architect, worked in the Sicilian Baroque style
- Luigi Vanvitelli (1700–1773), architect
- Andrea Giganti (1731–1787), architect

=== Neoclassicism ===
- Alessandro Antonelli (1798–1888), architect, known for Mole Antonelliana in Turin and the Novara Cathedral and the Basilica of St. Gaudenzio in Novara
- Nicola Bettoli (1780–1854), architect, known as the designer of the Neoclassicist Teatro Regio, and Duches Marie Louise (1821).
- Luigi Cagnola (1762–1833), architect, whose work influenced later generations of Italian architects.
- Luigi Canina (1795–1856), archaeologist and architect. He was important as a protagonist of archaeologically correct Neoclassicism in Rome.
- Antonio Corazzi (1792–1877), architect. He designed a number of imposing public buildings in Warsaw.
- Alessandro Galilei (1691–1737), architect. He designed the façades of Basilica of St. John Lateran (1733–1735) and San Giovanni dei Fiorentini (1734).
- Giacomo Leoni (1686–1746), architect
- Giuseppe Venanzio Marvuglia (1729–1814), architect. One of his works is Casina Cinese (1799–1802).
- Giovanni Battista Piranesi (1720–1778), engraver and architect, known for his grandiose architectural constructions.
- Giacomo Quarenghi (1744–1817), architect and painter, known as the builder of numerous works in Russia during and immediately after the reign of Catherine II the Great.
- Carlo Rossi (1775–1849), architect, who worked the major portion of his life in Russia.
- Francesco Sabatini (1722–1797), architect, who worked in Spain.
- Francesco Tamburini (1846–1891), architect who designed many important architectural landmarks in Argentina.
- Faustino Trebbi (1761–1836), architect and ornamental painter.
- Giuseppe Valadier (1762–1839), architect, urban planner, designer and writer. He was one of the most important exponents of international Neoclassicism in central Italy.

=== The 1900s ===
- Franco Albini (1905–1977), architect, urban planner and designer. His work was various and eclectic, and reflected the independence of Italian designs from the tyrannies of Modernist orthodoxy.
- Gae Aulenti (1927–2012), architect and designer known for her contributions to the design of museums such as the Musée d'Orsay, Centre Pompidou, and the Asian Art Museum of San Francisco, as well as the restoration of Palazzo Grassi in Venice.
- Carlo Aymonino (1926–2010), architect. He received the Honorary Fellow award from the American Institute of Architects.
- Ernesto Basile (1857–1932), architect, teacher and designer. An exponent of modernism and Art Nouveau.
- Mario Bellini (born 1935), architect and designer. He won Compasso d'Oro the eight times, and the Gold Medal of Civic Merit of the city of Milan.
- Achillina Bo (1914-1992), architect and designer migrated in Brazil.
- Cini Boeri (1924–2020), architect and designer who won many awards and prizes.
- Stefano Boeri (born 1956), architect and editor, founder of the research group "Multiplicity", former editor-in-chief of the magazines "Abitare" and "Domus".
- Achille Castiglioni (1918–2002), architect and designer. He won the Compasso d'Oro nine times. (See also: Livio and Pier Giacomo Castiglioni).
- Giancarlo De Carlo (1919–2005), architect, member of CIAM and Team 10. Known for his works at the University of Urbino (1973–1979 and later)
- Ignazio Gardella (1905–1999), architect, designer, race car driver and aircraft.
- Graziano Gasparini (1924–2019), architect specialised in restoring Spanish Colonial architecture, while pursuing a parallel career as an architectural historian.
- Roberto Gottardi (1927–2017), architect who worked in Venezuela and Cuba.
- Vittorio Gregotti (1927–2020), architect, designer and writer.
- Franca Helg (1920–1989), architect, designer, and academic.
- Adalberto Libera (1903–1963), architect. One of the most representative architects of the Italian Modern movement.
- Pier Luigi Nervi (1891–1979), structural engineer and architect known for his innovative use of reinforced concrete, especially with numerous notable thin shell structures worldwide.
- Alberto Meda (born 1945), Compasso d'Oro winning engineer and designer.
- Alessandro Mendini (1931–2019), designer and architect. His work is represented in museums and private collections all over the world.
- Giovanni Michelucci (1891–1990), architect, urban planner and engraver. A key figure in the progress and advancement of contemporary Italian architecture during the 20th century.
- Carlo Mollino (1905–1973), architect, designer, race car and aircraft driver.
- Luigi Moretti (1907–1973), architect. One of the most important Italian architects of the 20th century.
- Giovanni Muzio (1893–1982), architect. He was the most influential member of the group of Italian architects associated with the Novecento Italiano.
- Marcello Piacentini (1881–1960), architect and urban theorist most closely associated with Italy's fascist government.
- Renzo Piano (born 1937), architect, known for his design for the Centre Georges Pompidou (1971–1977) in Paris awarded by Pritzker Prize.
- Giò Ponti (1891–1979), architect and designer associated with the development of modern architecture and modern industrial design in Italy.
- Paolo Portoghesi (1931–2023), architect and architectural historian; became known as the creator of the original and significant Casa Baldi (1959) on the Via Flaminia.
- Jorge Rigamonti (1948–2008), architect migrated in Venezuela who produced national and international award-winning designs, an active architecture professor for over 30 years.
- Ernesto Nathan Rogers (1909–1969), architect and theoretician, partner BBPR architecture studio; cousin of architect Richard Rogers.
- Richard Rogers (1933–2021), architect noted for his modernist and functionalist designs in high-tech architecture.
- Aldo Rossi (1931–1997), architect and theoretician. His book The Architecture of the City (1966) is a classic of modern architectural theory.
- Giuseppe Samonà (1898–1983), architect and urban planner. One of the most important Italian architects of the 20th century.
- Antonio Sant'Elia (1888–1916), architect. Associated with the movement known as Futurism; known for his visionary drawings of the city of the future.
- Carlo Scarpa (1906–1978), architect. Among his works may be cited the Palazzo Foscari (1935–1956) and Castelvecchio Museum (1956–1964).
- Paolo Soleri (1919–2013), architect and urban planner creator of the Arcology stile. He established the educational Cosanti Foundation and Arcosanti.
- Ettore Sottsass (1917–2007), architect and designer; internationally known as one of the initiators of the renewal of design and architecture.
- Roberto Stampa (1858– after 1911), Italian architect.
- Manfredo Tafuri (1935–1994), architect, art historian and theorist. Known for his critical essays for Oppositions magazine (1970).
- Giuseppe Terragni (1904–1943), architect associated with Rationalism and Gruppo 7. His Casa del Fascio (1932–36) is regarded as his finest work.
- Paolo Venini (1895–1959), one of the leading figures in the production of Murano glass and an important contributor to 20th century Italian design.
- Lella and Massimo Vignelli (1934–2016 and 1934–2014 respectively), architects and designers known for packaging, houseware, furniture, public signage, and showroom design.
- Marco Zanuso (1916–2001), leading modernist architect and designer.
- Bruno Zevi (1918–2000), architect, historian, professor, curator, author, and editor. Zevi was a vocal critic of "classicizing" modern architecture and postmodernism.

== Chefs and gastronomists ==
- Pellegrino Artusi (1820–1911), writer and gastronomist, credited with establishing a truly national Italian cuisine. His La scienza in cucina e l'arte di mangiare bene (1891) was the first gastronomic treatise comprising all regions of united Italy.
- Bruno Barbieri
- Benny the Chef (Benedetto D'Epiro)
- Ettore Boiardi
- Massimo Bottura
- Caesar Cardini, creator of the Caesar salad.
- Martino da Como (c. 1430– late 15th century), "Prince of cooks", considered the western world's first celebrity chef. His book Libro de Arte Coquinaria (1465) was a benchmark for Italian cuisine and laid the ground for European gastronomic tradition.
- Giada De Laurentiis – host of the Food Network program Everyday Italian
- Carlo Petrini (born 1949), politician, writer and gastronomist. Taking part in a campaign against the McDonald's chain and a busy daily routine, he founded the worldwide influential Slow Food movement in 1986.
- Sirio Maccioni (1932–2020), restaurateur and author known for opening Le Cirque of New York.
- Luisa Marelli Valazza (born 1950), three-star Michelin chef.

== Craftsmen ==
- Cesare Antonio Accius (fl.1609), engraver.
- Nicola Amati (1596–1684), Master Luthier and a craftsman of string instruments.
- Pagolo Arsago (died 1563), goldsmith.
- Sebastiano Bianchi (fl.1580), engraver.
- Carlo Mario Camusso (died 1956), silversmith migrated in Peru.
- Alessandro della Via (fl.1730), engraver.
- Battista Farina (1893–1966), automobile designer and the founder of the Carrozzeria Pininfarina coachbuilding company, a name associated with many well-known postwar cars.
- Baldassare Gabbugiani (fl.1755), engraver.
- Gianni Gallo (1935–2011), engraver.
- Giorgetto Giugiaro (born 1938), automotive designer. In 1999 Giugiaro was named Car Designer of the Century and inducted into the Automotive Hall of Fame in 2002.
- Matteo Goffriller (1659–1742), master luthier, particularly noted for the quality of his cellos. He was the founder of the "Venetian School" of luthiers.
- Giuseppe Guarneri (1698–1744), master luthier from the Guarneri family of Cremona. He rivals Antonio Stradivari (1644–1737).
- Ferruccio Lamborghini (1916–1993), automobile designer, inventor, engineer, winemaker, industrialist, maker of high-end sports cars, and businessman; created Automobili Lamborghini in 1963.
- Flavio Manzoni (born 1965), architect and automobile designer, Senior Vice President of Design at Ferrari from 2010.
- Sergio Scaglietti (1920–2011), automobile designer.
- Antonio Stradivari (1644–1737), master Luthier and a craftsman of string instruments.
- Massimo Tamburini (1943–2014), motorcycle designer for Cagiva, Ducati, and MV Agusta.
- Bartolommeo Tutiani (fl. 1515), engraver.
- Antonio Zabelli (1742–1796), engraver.

== Engineers and inventors ==
- Giovanni Battista Antonelli (1527–1588), military engineer
- Battista Antonelli, military engineer, designed the major fortress of the Spanish Empire in the New World
- Eugenio Barsanti (1821–1864), engineer and Catholic priest, inventor of the Barsanti-Matteucci engine along with Felice Matteucci
- Walter Becchia (1896–1976), mechanical engineer, designed the motor of the Citroën 2CV
- Enrico Bernardi (1841–1919), inventor of an early petrol engine design
- Alfonso Bialetti (1888–1970), founder of Bialetti who popularized the moka pot stovetop coffee maker
- Giuseppe Mario Bellanca (1886–1960) - aviation pioneer, airplane designer and builder
- Enea Bossi Sr. (1888–1963), aerospace engineer and aircraft designer
- Giovanni Branca (1571–1645), engineer and architect
- Tito Livio Burattini (1617–1681), engineer, inventor, architect, Egyptologist, scientist, instrument-maker, traveller, and nobleman.
- Matteo Campani-Alimenis (1620–1678), inventor of the Magic lantern (1678).
- Secondo Campini (1904–1980), aircraft designer whose Caproni Campini N.1 made the first jet-powered aircraft flight announced to the public
- Alessandro Capra (c. 1608 – c. 1684), engineer, inventor, and mathematician
- Giovanni Battista Caproni (1886–1957), aeronautical engineer, civil engineer, electrical engineer, and aircraft designer who founded an aircraft-manufacturing company bearing his name (1908).
- Giorgio Carta, bioengineer, professor of chemical engineering
- Mario Castoldi (1888–1968), aeronautical engineer; designer of the Macchi MC.200, Macchi MC.202 and Macchi MC.205 fighter aircraft
- Bernard Castro (1904–1991), industrial engineer, inventor of the modern convertible couch
- Leonardo Chiariglione (born 1943), electrical engineer, inventor and co-founder of the Moving Pictures Experts Group (MPEG). He led a team that set the universal standards for digital audio and video, such as the mpeg and the mp3.
- Carlo Chiti, mechanical engineer, chief designer of Alfa Romeo and Ferrari race cars
- Aldo Costa (born 1961), engineer and engineering director; his 14 constructors' championships and 12 drivers' titles with Ferrari and Mercedes make him the most successful engineer and designer in F1 history.
- Mario Masciulli (1909–1991), military engineer of the Italian Regia Marina, director of the Office of Submarine Secret Weapons during World War II. He was awarded the Silver Medal of Military Valor.
- Luigi Negrelli (1799–1858), civil and hydraulic engineer; designed several bridges and railways in the Austrian Empire and well beyond, known for planning and designing the Suez Canal.
- Maria Artini (1894–1951), first female university graduate in electrical engineering in Italy (1918).
- Corradino D'Ascanio (1891–1981), aeronautical engineer, inventor of motor scooter (Vespa in 1946).
- Luigi Emanueli (1883–1959), engineer, inventor of oil-filled cable (1924).
- Lorenzo Allievi (1856–1941), hydraulic engineer, best known for his studies on the water hammer problem.
- Federico Faggin (born 1941), physicist, engineer, credited with developing the Self Aligned MOS Silicon Gate Technology, co-invented and designed the world's first microprocessor, the Intel 4004 (1970–1971).
- Enrico Forlanini (1848–1930), engineer and aeronautical pioneer, inventor of the helicopter (1877) and hydrofoil (1900).
- Flavio Gioia (c. 1300 – ?), mariner, inventor
- Francesco Lana de Terzi (1631–1687), Jesuit, mathematician, and naturalist. Called the father of aeronautics for his pioneering efforts.
- Leonardo da Vinci (1452–1519), artist, engineer, and scientist. Perhaps no one in history achieved so much in so many different fields.
- Vincenzo Lancia (1881–1937), racing driver, engineer and founder of Lancia car maker firm.
- Giovanni Luppis (1813–1875), engineer and officer, co-inventor of the self-propelled torpedo in the 1860s.
- Alfieri Maserati (1887–1932), automotive engineer, known for establishing and leading the Maserati racing car manufacturer with the other Maserati Brothers.
- Giorgina Madìa (1904–1942), physicist and electrical engineer, specializing in electrical communications, and a member of the Italian resistance during World War II.
- Felice Matteucci (1808–1887), hydraulic engineer, co-inventor with Eugenio Barsanti, of the internal combustion engine (1854).
- Antonio Meucci (1808–1889), chemical and mechanical engineer, inventor of the telephone (1871).
- Riccardo Morandi (1902–1989), engineer. He designed the Ponte Vespucci in Florence, the General Rafael Urdaneta Bridge in Venezuela, the Ponte Morandi in Genoa, and the Salone dell'Automobile in Turin.
- Pier Luigi Nervi (1891–1979) engineer, specialized in civil engineering. He collaborated with international architects, including Le Corbusier and Louis Kahn.
- Camillo Olivetti (1868–1943), electrical engineer, founder of Olivetti.
- Pier Giorgio Perotto (1930–2002), electrical engineer and inventor. Working for Olivetti he designed and built one of the world"s first electronic programmable calculators, the Programma 101, launched at the 1964 New York World's Fair.
- Giovanni Battista Piatti (1812–1867), civil engineer, inventor of the pneumatic rock-drilling machine.
- Giovanni Battista Pirelli (1848–1932), entrepreneur, engineer and politician, founder of rubber company Pirelli based in Milan.
- Ignazio Porro (1801–1875), engineer and optician, invented Porro prism binocular (1875).
- Adele Racheli (1897–1992), engineer, co-founder of Milan patent protection office (1925).
- Agostino Ramelli (1531–1600), engineer, invented the hydraulic motor (1588).
- Nicola Romeo (1876–1938), engineer and entrepreneur mostly known for founding the car manufacturer Alfa Romeo.
- Raffaele Rossetti (1881–1951), engineer and military naval officer, creator of the first human torpedo.
- Alberto Sangiovanni-Vincentelli (born on 1947), computer engineer. Professor at University of California, Berkeley. Co-founded Cadence Design Systems and Synopsys.
- Orazio Satta Puliga mechanical engineer, chief designer of Alfa Romeo Racing Team
- Germain Sommeiller (1815–1871), civil engineer. He directed the construction of the Fréjus Rail Tunnel between France and Italy; introduced the first industrial pneumatic drill for tunnel digging.
- Emma Strada (1884–1970), first woman to obtain a civil engineering degree from the Polytechnic of Turin.
- Juanelo Turriano (c. 1500–1585), clockmaker, engineer and mathematician. He built the Artificio de Juanelo.
- Andrea Viterbi (born 1935), Italian Jewish electrical engineer and businessman; co-founder of Qualcomm and inventor of the Viterbi algorithm

== Explorers ==
- Alberto Maria de Agostini (1883–1960), explorer of Patagonia
- António de Noli (1415– c. 1497), explorer for Portugal
- Giovanni Battista Belzoni (1778–1823), explorer, engineer, and amateur archaeologist, often regarded as one of the first Egyptologists
- John Cabot (Giovanni Caboto) (c. 1450–1499), explorer for England
- Sebastian Cabot (Sebastiano Caboto) (c. 1476–1557), cartographer and explorer for England and Spain, he explored the Río de la Plata, the Paraná River and was the person European to arrive in the lower section of the Paraguay River.
- Gaetano Casati (1838–1902), explorer of Africa
- Christopher Columbus (Cristoforo Colombo) (1451–1506), explorer for Spain. Born in Genua. In Italian language "Cristoforo Colombo". Sailed in 1492. Was the first European to arrive in the Bahamas and other Caribbean islands.
- Niccolò de' Conti (c. 1395–1469), merchant and explorer of India.
- Henri de Tonti (1649/1650–1704), explorer for France. Founded the first European settlement in the lower Mississippi River Valley in 1686.
- Giovanni da Pian del Carpine (c. 1180–1252), Franciscan friar, first noteworthy European traveller in the Mongol Empire.
- Giovanni da Verrazzano (1485–1528), explorer for France. First European to sight New York and Narragansett bays.
- Alessandro Malaspina (1754–1810), nobleman, Spanish naval officer and explorer.
- Umberto Nobile (1885–1978), engineer and Arctic explorer. The first man to fly over the North Pole.
- Juan Bautista Pastene, explored the coasts of Panama, Colombia, Ecuador, Peru and Chile as far south as the archipelago of Chiloé
- Antonio Pigafetta (c. 1491–1534), navigator and writer who accompanied Magellan in the first expedition of circumnavigation of the world.
- Filippo Salvatore Gilii (1721–1789), Jesuit priest who explored the basin of Orinoco River. Gilii is a highly celebrated figure in early South American linguistics due to his advanced insights into the nature of languages.
- Marco Polo (c. 1254–1324), explorer and merchant, famous for his travels in central Asia and China.
- Matteo Ricci (1552–1610), Italian Jesuit priest and one of the founding figures of the Jesuit China Mission.
- Pierre Savorgnan de Brazza (1852–1905), explorer for France. Famous for having added an area three times the size of France to the French empire in Africa.
- Ermanno Stradelli, explorer of Amazonian basin
- Amerigo Vespucci (1454–1512), explorer. Was the first European to arrive at the Amazon River in South America. The name for the Americas is derived from his given name.
- Romolo Gessi (1831–1881), explorer and soldier. He led numerous expeditions for the British in Africa, especially Sudan and the Nile River, freeing 30,000 slaves from bondage.

== Fictional characters ==
- Arlecchino
- Brighella
- Don Camillo
- Carmine Falcone
- Juliet Capulet
- Columbina
- Corleone family
- Salvatore Maroni
- Huntress
- Lucius Vorenus
- Titus Pullo
- Ezio Auditore da Firenze
- Mario Falcone
- Il Dottore
- Ugo Fantozzi
- Victor Frankenstein
- Luca Paguro, eponymous hero of the 2021 film, Luca
- Gianduja
- Romeo Montague
- Salvo Montalbano
- Mercutio
- Pantalone
- Peppone
- Pedrolino
- Ray Barone
- Tony Soprano
- Pierrot
- Pinocchio
- Pulcinella
- Scaramouche
- Topo Gigio
- Trivelino
- Tommy Vercetti
- Tony Verdeschi

== Filmmakers ==
- Filoteo Alberini (1865–1937), film director, one of the pioneers of cinema; devised the wide screen movies (1914).
- Gianni Amelio (born 1945), film director. He achieved international fame with The Stolen Children (winner of the Grand Jury Prize at the 1992 Cannes Film Festival).
- Michelangelo Antonioni (1912–2007), film director. His most successful motion pictures internationally were L'avventura (1960) and Blow-up (1966).
- Dario Argento (born 1940), film director, producer and screenwriter. Films include The Bird with the Crystal Plumage (1970), Deep Red (1975) and Suspiria (1977).
- Pupi Avati (born 1938), film director, producer and screenwriter. Some of his most successful films were Impiegati (1985), Christmas Present (1986) and The Last Minute (1987).
- Marco Bellocchio (born 1939), film director, screenwriter and actor. Known for his debut film Fists in the Pocket (1965).
- Roberto Benigni (born 1952), film director and actor. One of the most popular comics of Italian cinema; in 1997 he wrote, directed and starred in the international hit Life is Beautiful
- Bernardo Bertolucci (1940–2018), film director and screenwriter. Last Tango in Paris (1972) brought him international fame
- Alessandro Blasetti (1900–1987), film director and screenwriter was one of the leading figures in Italian cinema during the Fascist era. He is sometimes known as the "father of Italian cinema" because of his role in reviving the struggling industry in the late 1920s. Blasetti influenced Italian neorealism with the film Quattro passi fra le nuvole.
- Frank Capra (1897–1991), film director, producer and writer who became the creative force behind some of the major award-winning films of the 1930s and 1940s.
- Luigi Comencini (1916–2007), film director. Leading figure in Italian cinema; known for his film Bread, Love and Dreams (1953)
- Eduardo De Filippo (1900–1984), film director and actor
- Giuseppe De Santis (1917–1997), film director; known for his direction of Bitter Rice (1949), considered the first successful Neorealist film
- Vittorio De Seta (1923–2011), film director. He made nine such short documentaries over the decade and in 1960 made his feature film directorial debut with the acclaimed Banditi a Orgosolo
- Vittorio De Sica (1901–1974), film director and actor. His Shoeshine (1946), The Bicycle Thief (1948), and Umberto D. (1952) are classics of postwar Italian neorealism
- Ruggero Deodato (1939–2022), film director, actor and screenwriter. Creator of one of the most infamous splatter films of all time, 1979's neo-realist Amazonian nightmare Cannibal Holocaust
- Federico Fellini (1920–1993), film director. Won Oscars for La Strada (1954), Le Notti di Cabiria (1957), 8 1/2 (1963) and Amarcord (1973); one of the 20th century's most influential movie directors
- Marco Ferreri (1928–1997), film director. known film is La Grande Bouffe (1973).
- Lucio Fulci (1927–1996), film director, screenwriter and actor, known for his directorial work on gore films, including Zombi 2 (1979) and The Beyond (1981).
- Matteo Garrone (born 1968), film director; known for his film Gomorrah (2008)
- Pietro Germi (1914–1974), film director and actor. The film Divorce Italian Style (1961) was a huge worldwide box-office hit which earned him an Oscar for best screenplay
- Clyde Geronimi (1901–1989), animation director. He is best known for his work at Walt Disney Productions
- Alberto Lattuada (1914–2005), film director. Was a major figure in Italian cinema of the period after World War II. Known for co-directing with Fellini on his first film, Variety Lights (1950)
- Sergio Leone (1929–1989), film director. He is mostly associated with the "Spaghetti Western" genre, especially the dollar trilogy; one of the most influential directors of his generation
- Mario Monicelli (1915–2010), film director. One of the masters of the Commedia all'Italiana
- Nanni Moretti (born 1953), film director. He is known for his films Caro diario (1993) and The Son's Room (2001)
- Ermanno Olmi (1931–2018), film director; known for his internationally successful The Tree of Wooden Clogs (1978)
- Ferzan Özpetek (born 1959), film director and screenwriter. Film include The Ignorant Fairies (2001) and Facing Windows (2003)
- Pier Paolo Pasolini (1922–1975), film director and writer. His films include Mamma Roma (1962), The Gospel According to St. Matthew (1964), Oedipus Rex (1967) and Teorema (1968)
- Giovanni Pastrone (1883–1959), film director and producer. He conceived a colossal film designed to revolutionize movie-making, a goal he realized with Cabiria (1914)
- Elio Petri (1929–1982), film director and screenwriter. Investigation of a Citizen Above Suspicion (1970), is generally considered his masterpiece
- Gillo Pontecorvo (1919–2006), film director; known for authoring The Battle of Algiers (1966)
- Francesco Rosi (1922–2015), film director; known for his masterpiece Salvatore Giuliano (1962)
- Roberto Rossellini (1906–1977), film director. His films Rome, Open City (1945) and Paisà (1946) focussed international attention on the Italian Neorealist movement in films
- Gabriele Salvatores (born 1950), film director and screenwriter; known for his film Mediterraneo (1991)
- Martin Scorsese (born 1942), film director known for directing films such as Goodfellas (1990) and various other gangster films.
- Michele Soavi (born 1957), film director; known for his film Cemetery Man (1994)
- Silvio Soldini (born 1958), film director, known films we find Bread and Tulips (1999) and Agata e la tempesta (2004)
- Paolo Sorrentino (born 1970), film director and screenwriter. He is known for his film The Consequences of Love (2004)
- Paolo and Vittorio Taviani (born 1931, 1929–2018), have directed together several successful movies. Among those are: Padre Padrone (1977), The Night of the Shooting Stars (1982) and Kaos (1984)
- Giuseppe Tornatore (born 1956), film director, known for his masterpiece Cinema Paradiso (1988)
- Luchino Visconti (1906–1976), film and theatre director; called the father of neorealism for his early films Ossessione (1943) and La terra trema (1948)
- Lina Wertmüller (1928–2021), film director. She achieved international fame with The Seduction of Mimi (1972) and Love and Anarchy (1973). She was the first female to be nominated for the Academy Award for Best Director.
- Franco Zeffirelli (1923–2019), film director. Among his major films are three Shakespeare adaptations: The Taming of the Shrew (1967), Romeo and Juliet (1968) and Hamlet (1990)
- Valerio Zurlini (1926–1982), film director, stage director and screenwriter. He is well known for his internationally successful Estate Violenta (1959)

== Illustrators ==
- Leonetto Cappiello (1875–1942), poster art designer. He has been called the father of modern advertising
- Adolfo de Carolis (1874–1928), painter, illustrator and wood-engraver
- Onofrio Catacchio (born 1964), cartoonist
- Max Crivello (born 1958), illustrator and cartoonist
- Gabriele Dell'Otto (born 1973), illustrator and author whose works have been published around the world
- Franco Donatelli (1924–1995), comic artist and illustrator
- Virginio Livraghi, comic strip illustrator
- Enrico Mazzanti (1850–1910), engineer and cartoonist, who illustrated the first edition of Pinocchio
- Bartolomeo Pinelli (1781–1835), illustrator and engraver. He illustrated in his figures the costumes of the Italian peoples, the great epic poems and numerous other subjects
- Valentina Romeo (born 1977), cartoonist, illustrator, billiards player
- Maria Zacchè (born 1933), illustrator
- Laura Zuccheri (born 1971), comic artist, illustrator, and painter

== Military and political figures ==
=== Etruscan civilization ===
- Mezentius, legendary Etruscan king who reigned at Caere and fought against Aeneas
- Lars Porsena (6th century BC), legendary Etruscan king, alleged to have besieged Rome in a vain attempt to reinstate Lucius Tarquinius Superbus on the throne
- Lars Tolumnius (died 428 BC), the most famous king of the wealthy Etruscan city-state of Veii

=== Ancient Rome ===
- Agrippa Menenius Lanatus (died 493 BC), consul of the Roman Republic in 503 BC, with Publius Postumius Tubertus. Victorious over the Sabines and was awarded a triumph which he celebrated on 4 April 503 BC.
- Scipio Aemilianus (185 BC–129 BC), Roman general famed both for his exploits during the Third Punic War (149–146 BC) and for his subjugation of Spain (134–133 BC)
- Caligula (31 August 12–24 January 41 AD) was Roman emperor from 37 to 41 AD. Was widely considered to be one of Rome's most cruel and sadistic emperors ever to rule
- Marcus Aemilius Lepidus (c. 89 or 88 BC–late 13 or early 12 BC), Roman statesman, one of the triumvirs who ruled Rome after 43 BC
- Lucius Aemilius Paullus Macedonicus (ca. 229 BC–160 BC), Roman general whose victory over the Macedonians at Pydna ended the Third Macedonian War.
- Publius Cornelius Scipio (c. 255 BC-211 BC), Roman general and statesman of the Roman Republic and the father of Scipio Africanus.
- Nero (15 December 37–9 June 68 AD) The last emperor of the Julio-Claudian Dynasty and is believed to be responsible for the burning of Rome
- Mark Antony (83 BC–30 BC), Roman politician and general
- Romulus and Remus (c. mid to late 8th century BC), Romulus was the first king of the Roman Kingdom
- Marcus Atilius Regulus (fl. 3rd century BC), Roman general and statesman
- Augustus (63 BC–AD 14), first and among the most important of the Roman Emperors. One of the great administrative geniuses of history
- Publius Quinctilius Varus (46 BC – AD 9), Roman general and politician. Varus is generally remembered for having lost three Roman legions when ambushed by Germanic tribes led by Arminius in the Battle of the Teutoburg Forest, whereupon he took his own life.
- Marcus Aurelius (121–180), Roman emperor, has symbolized for many generations in the West the Golden Age of the Roman Empire
- Lucius Junius Brutus (545 BC–509 BC), Roman consul, traditional founder of the Roman Republic
- Marcus Junius Brutus (85 BC–42 BC), Roman politician, leader of the conspirators who assassinated Julius Caesar (44 BC)
- Julius Caesar (100 BC–44 BC), Roman statesman and general, famous for the conquest of Gaul. A figure of genius and audacity equaled by few in history
- Marcus Furius Camillus (c. 446 BC–365 BC), Roman soldier and statesman
- Catiline (108 BC–62 BC), Roman politician
- Tiberius (16 November 42 BC–16 March 37 AD), second Roman emperor, succeeding Augustus
- Cato the Elder (234 BC–149 BC), Roman statesman, orator and the first Latin prose writer of importance
- Cato the Younger (95 BC–46 BC), Roman politician and statesman in the late Roman Republic
- Cicero (106 BC–43 BC), Roman statesman, scholar, writer and orator.
- Cincinnatus (519 BC–438 BC), Roman politician
- Appius Claudius Caecus (fl. 3rd century BC), outstanding statesman, legal expert, and author of early Rome
- Marcus Claudius Marcellus (c. 268 BC–208 BC), Roman general who captured Syracuse during the Second Punic War (218–201)
- Publius Cornelius Scipio Africanus (236/235 BC–183 BC), general and statesman, most notable as one of the main architects of Rome's victory against Carthage in the Second Punic War.One of the great military minds of all times
- Publius Clodius Pulcher (c. 93 BC–52 BC), disruptive politician, head of a band of political thugs, and bitter enemy of Cicero in late republican Rome
- Lucius Cornelius Scipio Barbatus (?–c. 280 BC), consul in 298 BC. He defeated the Etruscans at Volaterrae and afterwards fought against the Samnites
- Lucius Cornelius Sulla (c. 138 BC–78 BC), Roman general and statesman
- Manius Curius Dentatus (?–270 BC), Roman general. As consul led the Romans to victory over the Samnites and defeated Pyrrhus of Epirus near Beneventum (275 BC)
- Gaius Duilius (fl. 3rd century BC), Roman commander who won a major naval victory over the Carthaginians during the First Punic War (264–241 BC)
- Germanicus (15 BC–AD 19), Roman general who avenged the defeat sustained by Varus (AD 9), defeating Arminius at Idistaviso on the Weser (AD 16)
- Gaius Gracchus (154 BC–121 BC), Roman politician
- Marcus Licinius Crassus (c. 115 BC–53 BC), Roman general and politician
- Lucullus (c. 117 BC–57/56 BC), Roman general who fought Mithradates VI Eupator of Pontus from 74 to 66 BC
- Gaius Maecenas (70 BC–8 BC), Roman diplomat, counsellor to the Roman emperor Augustus
- Gaius Marius (157 BC–86 BC), Roman general and politician
- Quintus Fabius Maximus Verrucosus (c. 280 BC–203 BC), Roman politician and general, famous for having invented the guerrilla warfare (method of combat in 217 BC)
- Lucius Aemilius Paullus Macedonicus (c. 229 BC–160 BC), Roman general whose victory over the Macedonians at Pydna ended the Third Macedonian War (171–168 BC)
- Pontius Pilate (16 BC–AD 36), Roman politician, famous primarily as a crucial character in the New Testament account of Jesus
- Antoninus Pius (86–161), Roman emperor, mild-mannered and capable, he was the fourth of the Five Good Emperors"
- Pompey (106 BC–48 BC), Roman military and political leader of the late Roman Republic
- Lucius Tarquinius Superbus (535 BC-509 BC), King of Rome famed for his resistance against the people trying to found the Roman Republic
- Trajan (53–117), Emperor who presided over the greatest expansion in Roman history. He was born in Italica, a colony of Italian settlers in Hispania, and his family was from Umbria
- Titus Quinctius Flamininus (c. 229 BC–174 BC), Roman general and statesman who established the Roman hegemony over Greece
- Quintus Sertorius (c. 126 BC–73 BC), one of the most able Roman generals, who displayed a particular genius for leading armies of irregulars
- Marcus Vipsanius Agrippa (63 BC–12 BC), Roman statesman and general; he was long honored by the Roman military as the inventor of the Harpax
- Titus Caesar Vespasianus (39BC – 81 BC), Roman emperor from 79 to 81. A member of the Flavian dynasty, Titus becoming the first Roman emperor ever to succeed his biological father.
- Gaius Ofonius Tigellinus (c. 10–69), prefect of the Roman Imperial bodyguard, known as the Praetorian Guard, from 62 until 68, during the reign of Emperor Nero.
- Flavius Aetius (391–454), military commander and the most influential man in the Roman Empire for two decades (433–454). He was called as The Last Roman

=== Roman Catholic Church ===
- Pope Adrian I (c. 700–795), pope from 772 to 795; his pontificate was unequalled in length by that of any successor of Saint Peter until a thousand years later
- Pope Agapetus I (?–536), of noble birth, he was an archdeacon at the time of his election (13 May 535)
- Pope Alexander III (c. 1100/1105–1181), pope from 1159 to 1181. He is remembered for the long-standing dispute with the Holy Roman Emperor Frederick I
- Ambrose (337 or 340–397), bishop of Milan; one of the most influential ecclesiastical figures of the 4th century; he was also the teacher of Saint Augustine
- Augustine of Canterbury (?–604), Benedictine monk and the first Archbishop of Canterbury. He is considered the "Apostle to the English" and a founder of the English Church
- Benedict of Nursia (c. 480 – c. 547), father of Western monasticism; the rule that he established became the norm for monastic living throughout Europe
- Pope Benedict V (?–966), pope, or antipope, from 22 May 964, to 23 June 964, when he was deposed
- Pope Boniface VIII (c. 1235–1303), issued in 1302, the famous bull Unam sanctam (pushing papal supremacy to its historical extreme)
- Pope Celestine I (?–432), pope from 422 to 432
- Pope Celestine V (1215–1296), pope from 5 July to 13 December 1294, the first pontiff to abdicate. He founded the Celestine order
- Peter Damian (c. 1007–1072), cardinal and Doctor of the Church. He was an original leader and a forceful figure in the Gregorian Reform movement
- Pope Gregory I (c. 540–604), founder" of the medieval papacy, which exercised both secular and spiritual power; he is considered one of the great Latin Fathers of the Church
- Pope Gregory II (669–731), greatly encouraged the Christianizing of Germany by SS; the Donation of Sutri (728) is considered the constitutive act of the Papal States
- Pope Gregory VII (c. 1015/1028–1085), one of the great reforming popes; known for the part he played in the Investiture Controversy
- John Gualbert (985 or 995–1073), Roman Catholic saint. The founder of the Vallumbrosan Order
- Pope Honorius I (?–638), pope from 625 to 638 whose posthumous condemnation as a heretic subsequently caused extensive controversy on the question of papal infallibility
- Pope Honorius III (?–1227), often considered one of the great administrators in papal history
- Pope Innocent III (1160–1216), during his reign, the papacy was at the height of its powers
- Pope John II (?–535), pope from 533 to 535. He was the first pontiff to change his original name, which he considered pagan, assuming the name of the martyred Saint John I (523–526)
- Pope John VIII (?–?), often considered one of the ablest pontiffs of the 9th century
- Pope John XIX (?–1032), pope from 1024 to 1032
- Pope Julius II (1443–1513), pope from 1503 to 1513. Nicknamed the Warrior Pope or the Fearsome Pope, he chose his papal name not in honour of Pope Julius I but in emulation of Julius Caesar.
- Pope Leo I (c. 400–461), pope from 440 to 461, master exponent of papal supremacy
- Pope Leo III (750–816), known for crowning Charlemagne as the first Holy Roman Emperor
- Pope Liberius (?–366), pope from 352 to 366
- Matilda of Tuscany (1046–1115), noblewoman. She was a strong supporter of the papacy during the Investiture Controversy
- Carlo Musitano (1635–1714), Catholic priest and physician
- Pope Nicholas I (c. 800–867), pope from 858 to 867, master theorist of papal power, considered to have been the most forceful of the early medieval pontiffs
- Paulinus of Nola (353–431), bishop of Nola and one of the most important Christian Latin poets of his time. He is also the inventor of church bells
- Romuald (c. 950–1025–1027), Christian ascetic who founded the Camaldolese Benedictines (Hermits)
- Pope Sergius I (?–701), pope from 687 to 701, one of the most important 7th-century pontiffs
- Pope Stephen II (715–757), pope from 752 to 757. He severed ties with the Byzantine Empire and thus became the first temporal sovereign of the newly founded Papal States
- Pope Sylvester I (?–335), one of the most illustrious popes of his age; after his death, became a major figure of legend
- Pope Symmachus (?–514), pope from 498 to 514
- Rainerius Saccho, 13th century Inquisitor

=== Renaissance ===
- Alessandro de' Medici, Duke of Florence (1510–1537), the first duke of Florence (1532–37)
- Catherine de' Medici (1519–1589), Queen of France
- Cosimo de' Medici (1389–1464), founder of the Medici political dynasty
- Cosimo I de' Medici, Grand Duke of Tuscany (1519–1574), second duke of Florence (1537–74) and first grand duke of Tuscany (1569–74)
- Ferdinando I de' Medici, Grand Duke of Tuscany (1549–1609), grand duke of Tuscany from 1587 to 1609
- Francesco I de' Medici, Grand Duke of Tuscany (1541–1587), second grand duke of Tuscany, ruling from 1574 to 1587
- Giovanni di Bicci de' Medici (1360–1429), restored the family fortune and made the Medici family the wealthiest in Europe
- Lorenzo de' Medici (1449–1492), leader of Florence during the Golden Age of the Renaissance; patron of arts and letters, the most brilliant of the Medici
- Marie de' Medici (1575–1642), Queen and Regent of France who was a harsh opponent of Protestantism in France
- Salvestro de' Medici (1331–1388), Gonfaloniere and Provost of the city of Florence
- Pope Clement VII (Giulio de' Medici) (1478–1534), pope from 1523 to 1534; it was Pope Clement who excommunicated Henry VIII of England
- Pope Leo X (Giovanni de' Medici) (1475–1521), cardinal-deacon from the age of 13
- Pope Leo XI (Alessandro Ottaviano de' Medici) (1535–1605), pope from 1–27 April 1605
- Cesare Borgia (1475/1476–1507), Spanish-Italian condottiero, nobleman, politician, and cardinal. Powerful lord, and a leading figure in the politics of his era
- Castruccio Castracani degli Antelminelli (1281–1328). condottiero and duke of Lucca
- Bartolomeo Colleoni (1400–1475), condottiere, at various times in Venetian and Milanese service and from 1454 general in chief of the Republic of Venice for life
- Andrea Doria (1466–1560), condottiere, and admiral who was the foremost naval leader of his time
- Galeazzo da Sanseverino(1460–1525), condottiere and Grand Écuyer de France
- Erasmo of Narni (1370–1443, known as Gattamelata), served Florence, Venice and the pope before becoming dictator of Padua
- Frederick II, Holy Roman Emperor (1194–1250), King of Sicily and promoter of Sicilian culture and political power; expanded domain into much of Italy
- Federico da Montefeltro (1422–1482), lord of Urbino from 1444 (as Duke from 1474) until his death. He is widely regarded as one of the most successful condottieri of his time
- Giovanni dalle Bande Nere (1498–1526), the most noted soldier of all the Medici
- Giovanni Giustiniani Longo (1418–1453), kinsman to the powerful house of Doria in Genoa and protostrator of the Byzantine Empire, who led the defense of Constantinople against the Ottoman army of Sultan Mehmed II in 1453.
- Sigismondo Pandolfo Malatesta (1417–1468), condottiero and nobleman. He was widely considered by his contemporaries as one of the most daring military leaders in Italy
- Angelo Tartaglia (1350 or 1370 – 1421), was a great soldier of fortune, captain of the Papal Army, lord of Lavello and Toscanella
- Niccolò Piccinino (1386–1444), soldier of fortune who played an important role in the 15th-century wars of the Visconti of Milan against Venice, Florence, and the pope
- Giovanni Dionigi Galeni (1519–1587), farmer, then Ottoman privateer and admiral, who later became beylerbey of the Regency of Algiers, and finally Grand Admiral of the Ottoman fleet
- Francesco I Sforza (1401–1466), condottiere who played a crucial role in 15th-century Italian politics
- Muzio Sforza (1369–1424), soldier of fortune who played an important role in the wars of his period and whose son Francesco became duke of Milan
- Gian Giacomo Trivulzio (1440/1441–1518), aristocrat and condottiero who served as a military captain under Galeazzo, later became the grand Marshal of France
- Sebastiano Venier (c. 1496–1578), Doge of Venice from 1577 to 1578. He is best remembered in his role as the Venetian admiral at the Battle of Lepanto
- Roberto Sanseverino d'Aragona (1418 – 10 August 1487) was a Neapolitan condottiero, Highly esteemed man of arms, veteran of numerous battles, he was one of the greatest leaders of the Italian Renaissance.
- Fabrizio Maramaldo (1494—December 1552) was an Italian Condottiero.

=== Early Modern period to Unification ===
- Charles Emmanuel I, Duke of Savoy (1562–1630), skilled soldier and shrewd politician. He was nicknamed Testa d'feu ("Head of Fire") for his rashness and military attitudes
- Camillo Caracciolo, 2nd Prince of Avellino (1563- 1630), was a Neapolitan military leader and statesman of the Kingdom of Naples and the Spanish Empire.
- Girolamo Carafa (1564 – 1633) was general in Spanish and Imperial service from Abruzzo. He participated in the Thirty Years War and the Eighty Years War. He is remembered for his major contribution at the Battle of White Mountain.
- Ottavio d'Aragona Taglivia (1565-1623) was a Sicilian commander and nobleman in the service of the Hispanic Monarchy.
- Tommaso Caracciolo (1572–1631), was a Field Marshal who commanded parts of the Spanish forces in the Thirty Years' War.
- Carlo Andrea Caracciolo, 2nd Marquis of Torrecuso, (1583–1646 ), was a Neapolitan nobleman and soldier in the service of the Spanish Empire
- Michelangelo Alessandro Colli-Marchi (1738–1808), general in the service of the Austrian army
- Torquato Conti (1591–1636), military commander who served as a General-Field Marshal of the Holy Roman Empire during the Thirty Years' War
- Andrea Cantelmo (1598 – 1645) was a Neapolitan commander of Habsburg armies during the Thirty Years' War, the War of the Mantuan Succession, the second phase of the Eighty Years' War, the Franco-Spanish War (1635–59), and the Reapers War.
- Eugene of Savoy (1663–1736), general in the service of the Austrian Holy Roman emperor
- Francesco Morosini (1619–1694), doge of Venice (1688–94), of a family distinguished in Venice for five centuries
- Alexander Farnese, Duke of Parma (1545–1592), revitalized Spanish rule in the southern provinces of the Netherlands (modern Belgium and Luxembourg)
- Francesco Eboli (1693–1758) was an Italian nobleman and soldier, Duke of Castropignano. Famous for his victory at the Battle of Velletri (1744)
- Achille Fontanelli (1755–1838), Minister of War and general of the Napoleonic Kingdom of Italy
- Pasquale Paoli (1725–1807), statesman and general, hailed as the father of Corsica. He wrote and promulgated the modern world's first democratic constitution in 1755
- Pietro Micca (1677–1706), the miner who at the sacrifice of his own life saved the citadel of Turin (1706) from French troops
- Francesco Morosini (1619–1694), doge of Venice (1688–94), of a family distinguished in Venice for five centuries
- Raimondo Montecuccoli (1609–1680), field marshal and military reformer. In the service of the Habsburgs, he took part in the Thirty Years' War
- Napoleon (1769–1821), Corsican military and political leader, founder and leader of the First French Empire, the Italian Republic and Kingdom
- Ottavio Piccolomini (1599–1656), general and diplomat in the service of the House of Habsburg during the Thirty Years' War
- Franziska Scanagatta (1776–1864), military officer who served the Austrian Empire.
- Ambrogio Spinola, 1st Marquis of the Balbases (1569–1630), general and master of siege warfare in the service of Spain
- Victor Amadeus II of Savoy (1666–1732), King of Sicily (1713–1720) and of Sardinia (1720–1730), established the foundation for the future Italian national state
- Lucio Caracciolo (1771 - 1836) was a Neapolitan aristocrat and general who was a distinguished member of the Courts and Cavalry Commander in the Napoleonic Wars
- Carlo Luigi Castelli (1790-1860), militar of Venezuela independence war

=== 1861 to the rise of Fascism ===
- Pietro Badoglio (1871–1956), general and statesman during the dictatorship of Benito Mussolini
- Italo Balbo (1896–1940), airman and fascist leader who played a decisive role in developing Benito Mussolini's air force
- Oreste Baratieri (1841–1901), general and governor of Italian Eritrea
- Cesare Battisti (1875–1916), politician
- Camillo Benso, conte di Cavour (1810–1861), politician, leading figure in the movement toward Italian unification
- Jacques Alexandre Bixio (1808–1865), medical doctor, balloonist, and politician migrated in France
- Nino Bixio (1821-1873), general and politician during the Italian Wars of Unification.
- Juan Bautista Cambiaso (1820–1886), sailor and soldier, best known for helping establish the naval forces of the nascent Dominican Republic
- Francesco Crispi (1819–1901), statesman who, after being exiled from Naples and Sardinia-Piedmont for revolutionary activities, eventually became premier of a united Italy
- Salvo D'Acquisto (1920–1943), member of the Italian Carabinieri, awarded the Gold Medal of Military Valor in memory of his heroism
- Tommaso De Cristoforis, Lieutenant Colonel notable for his command during the Battle of Dogali and was awarded the Gold Medal of Military Valor
- Francesco de Pinedo (1890–1933), aviator officer who is best known for his long-range flying boat flights in the 1920s that demonstrated the feasibility of global air travel.
- Armando Diaz (1861–1928), general and a Marshal of Italy during the I World War
- Giulio Douhet (1869–1930), military, the first to envision the true potential of airpower and strategic bombardment
- Alessandro Ferrero La Marmora (1799–1855), general who is best remembered for founding the military unit known as the Bersaglieri
- Orestes Ferrara (1876–1972), attorney and journalist, who fought for Cuba's independence who founded one of the best newspapers of La Habana
- Giuseppe Garibaldi (1807–1882), patriot and soldier of the Risorgimento; contributed to the achievement of Italian unification under the royal House of Savoy
- Maurizio Giglio (1920–1944), soldier, policeman and secret agent, recipient of the Gold Medal of Military Valor
- Giovanni Giolitti (1842–1928), statesman and five times prime minister under whose leadership Italy prospered
- Antonio Gramsci (1891–1937), intellectual and politician, a founder of the Italian Communist Party whose ideas greatly influenced Italian communism
- Giacomo Matteotti (1885–1924), socialist politician. He strongly denounced the National Fascist Party. Two weeks after his speech, he was kidnapped and murdered by fascists
- Giuseppe Mazzini (1805–1872), propagandist and revolutionary; a champion of the movement for Italian unity known as the Risorgimento
- Benito Mussolini (1883–1945), prime minister (1922–43) and the first of 20th-century Europe's fascist dictators
- Nick Nuccio (1901–1989), was two-time mayor of Tampa, Florida in the 1950s and 60s.
- Vittorio Emanuele Orlando (1860–1952), Prime Minister of Italy from October 1917 to June 1919. Representing Italy in the 1919 Paris Peace Conference with his foreign minister Sidney Sonnino. Known as "Premier of Victory" for defeating the Central Powers along with the Entente in World War I
- Coriolano Ponza di San Martino (1842–1926), general and politician. Senator of the Kingdom and Minister of War in the Pelloux II, Saracco and Zanardelli governments.
- Daisy di Robilant (died 1933), noblewoman, fascist and feminist campaigner for children's and women's rights
- Serafino Romualdi (1900-1967), writer, labor unionist and anti-fascist activist. He was an official with United States unions and anti-communist labor federations in their work in Central and South America.
- Carlo Rosselli (1899–1937), political leader, journalist, and historian. He was committed to the anti-fascist struggle in Italy and in the Spanish Civil War
- Piero Torrigiani (1846–1920), mayor of Florence
- Enrico Toti (1882–1916), deportist, patriot and hero of World War I
- Umberto II di Savoia (1904–1983), was the last King of Italy
- Victor Emmanuel II (1820–1878), King of Sardinia–Piedmont who became the first king of a united Italy
- Victor Emmanuel III (1869–1947), King of Italy whose reign brought the end of the Italian monarchy

=== Italian Republic ===
- Giulio Andreotti (1919–2013), Christian Democratic politician who was several times prime minister of Italy in the period from 1972 to 1992
- Enrico Berlinguer (1922–1984), secretary-general of the Italian Communist Party from March 1972 until his death
- Silvio Berlusconi (1936–2023), media tycoon who served three times as prime minister of Italy (1994; 2001–06; 2008–11)
- Umberto Bossi (born 1941), politician who was leader (born 1991) of the Lega Nord party
- Bettino Craxi (1934–2000), politician who became his nation's first Socialist prime minister (1983–87)
- Alcide De Gasperi (1881–1954), statesman and politician, considered to be one of the Founding fathers of the European Union
- Enrico De Nicola (1877–1959), politician, the first provisional Head of State of the newborn republic of Italy from 1946 to 1948
- Antonio Di Pietro (born 1950), jurist and politician who uncovered a wide-ranging government corruption scandal
- Luigi Einaudi (1874–1961), economist and statesman, the first president (1948–55) of the Republic of Italy
- Mario Draghi (born 1947), politician, economist, banker, prime minister of Italy since 2021. He served as President of the European Central Bank (ECB) between 2011 and 2019
- Amintore Fanfani (1908–1999), leader served five times as premier of Italy
- Nilde Iotti (1920–1999), politician
- Aldo Moro (1916–1978), leader of the Christian Democratic Party, who served five times as premier of Italy. In 1978 he was kidnapped and subsequently murdered by left-wing terrorists
- Lorenzo Natali (1922-1989)[1], journalist and politician, two times elected as vicepresident of European Commission
- Romano Prodi (born 1939), politician who was twice prime minister of Italy (1996–98; 2006–08) and who served as president of the European Commission (1999–2004)
- Serafino Romualdi (1900-1967), writer, labor unionist and anti-fascist activist. He was an official with United States unions and anti-communist labor federations in their work in Central and South America.
- Antonio Segni (1891–1972), statesman, twice premier (1955–57, 1959–60), and fourth president (1962–64) of Italy
- Luigi Sturzo (1871–1959), priest, public official, and political organizer who founded a party that was a forerunner of the Italian Christian Democrat movement
- Palmiro Togliatti (1893–1964), politician who led the Italian Communist Party for nearly 40 years and made it the largest in Europe
- Altiero Spinelli (1907–1986), statesman, author of the so-called "Spinelli Plan", co-author of the Ventotene Manifesto, founder of the Crocodile Club, co-founder of the Union of European Federalists, hailed as one of the Fathers of European Union

== Musicians ==
=== Composers ===
==== Middle Ages ====
- Johannes Ciconia (c. 1370–1412), composer and theorist. His open melodic style, clarity of texture, and "modern" sense of harmonic direction make him an attractive and accessible composer
- Gherardello da Firenze (c. 1320/1325–1362–1363), composer. He was known for his liturgical compositions but only two mass movements have survived
- Guido of Arezzo (c. 990–1050), music theorist whose principles served as a foundation for modern Western musical notation
- Jacopo da Bologna (fl. 1340–1360), court composer during the Trecento and one of the earliest composers of polyphonic secular songs
- Francesco Landini (c. 1325/1335–1397), composer, organist and poet. Celebrated in his own day as a master of the Italian ars nova style, among his works are madrigals, cacce, and ballate
- Marchetto da Padova (fl. 1305–1319), music theorist and composer. He lived at Cesena and Verona at some time and was in the service of Rainier, Prince of Monaco

==== Renaissance ====
- Giovanni Animuccia (c. 1500–1571), composer who contributed to the development of the oratorio
- Adriano Banchieri (1568–1634), one of the principal composers of madrigal comedies and choral pieces
- Giulio Caccini (1551–1618), composer and singer; Le nuove musiche (1602), a collection of songs with basso continuo, was of landmark importance in establishing the new monodic style
- Francesco Canova da Milano (1497–1543), lutenist and composer. Known as Il divino ("the divine"), he was the finest composer of lute music before John Dowland
- Emilio de' Cavalieri (1550–1602), composer. One of the earliest to compose dramatic music
- Andrea Gabrieli (1532/33–1585), composer and organist, known for his madrigals and his large-scale choral and instrumental music for public ceremonies
- Giovanni Gabrieli (c. 1554/1557–1612), composer and organist. He was one of the most influential musicians of his time
- Carlo Gesualdo (1566–1613), composer and lutist. He is famous for his intensely expressive madrigals, which use a chromatic language not heard of until the 19th century
- Giovanni Pierluigi da Palestrina (1525/1526–1594), composer associated with the Roman School (Renaissance music)
- Luzzasco Luzzaschi (c. 1545–1607), composer, organist, and teacher of the late Renaissance
- Luca Marenzio (1553–1599), composer whose madrigals are considered to be among the finest examples of Italian madrigals of the late 16th century
- Claudio Merulo (1533–1604), composer. He was organist of Brescia Cathedral (1556–7) and of St Mark's Basilica, Venice (1557–84), where he was also an organ consultant, publisher and teacher
- Claudio Monteverdi (1567–1643), composer, violinist and singer considered a crucial figure in the history of music
- Jacopo Peri (1561–1633), composer and singer; often called the inventor of opera
- Gioseffo Zarlino (1517–1590), composer and writer on music, the most celebrated music theorist of the mid-16th century

==== Baroque ====
- Tomaso Albinoni (1671–1751), composer remembered chiefly for his instrumental music
- Gregorio Allegri (1582–1652), composer of church music. The famous Miserere, performed yearly on Wednesday and Friday of Passion Week, in the papal chapel, is his composition
- Francesca Caccini (1587–1641), composer and singer, daughter of Giulio Caccini. She was the first woman to compose opera and probably the most prolific woman composer of her time
- Antonio Caldara (1670/71–1736), composer. He composed many operas and oratorios, other sacred and secular vocal music, and chamber works. His canons were especially popular
- Giacomo Carissimi (1605–1674), composer and one of the most celebrated masters of the early Baroque, or, more accurately, the Roman School of music
- Francesco Cavalli (1602–1676), the most important Italian composer of opera in the mid-17th century
- Antonio Cesti (1623–1669), composer who, with Francesco Cavalli, was one of the leading Italian composers of the 17th century
- Arcangelo Corelli (1653–1713), violinist, composer, conductor and teacher. Founder of the Italian school of violin
- Girolamo Frescobaldi (1583–1643), musician and one of the most important composers of keyboard instrumental music in the late Renaissance and early Baroque music periods
- Francesco Geminiani (1687–1762), composer, violinist, teacher, writer on musical performance, and a leading figure in early 18th-century music
- Leonardo Leo (1694–1744), composer who was noted for his comic operas and who was instrumental in forming the Neapolitan style of opera composition
- Pietro Locatelli (1695–1764), composer and violinist. His influential L′arte del violino (1733) contains 12 solo violin concertos and 24 caprices for solo violin
- Jean Baptiste Lully (1632–1687), Italian-French composer. He was court composer to Louis XIV, founding the national French opera and producing court ballets for Molière's plays
- Giovanni Battista Pergolesi (1710–1736), composer whose intermezzo La serva padrona (1733) was one of the most celebrated stage works of the 18th century
- Nicola Porpora (1686–1768), composer. Leading Italian teacher of singing of the 18th century
- Alessandro Scarlatti (1660–1725), composer of operas and religious works. He is considered the founder of the Neapolitan school of opera
- Domenico Scarlatti (1685–1757), composer noted particularly for his 555 keyboard sonatas, which substantially expanded the technical and musical possibilities of the harpsichord
- Barbara Strozzi (1619–1677), virtuoso singer and composer of vocal music, one of only a few women in the 17th century to publish their own compositions
- Giuseppe Tartini (1692–1770), violinist, composer, and theorist who helped establish the modern style of violin bowing and formulated principles of musical ornamentation and harmony
- Giuseppe Torelli (1658–1709), composer and violinist, noted for his essential role in the development of the solo concerto, concerto grosso, and sonata da camera forms
- Antonio Vivaldi (1678–1741), composer, Italian baroque, known for violin music and the concerto grosso
- Domenico Zipoli (1688–1726), organist and composer. He migrated to Córdoba, Viceroyalty of Peru. He became a Jesuit in order to work in the Reductions of Paraguay where he taught music among the Guaraní people.

==== Classical period ====
- Luigi Boccherini (1743–1805), composer and cellist. His vast chamber music output includes some 125 string quintets, some 90 string quartets, and many string trios
- Ferdinando Carulli (1770–1841), guitarist, composer and teacher. Known for his concertos, sonatas, studies, variations and transcriptions (over 300 opus numbers)
- Domenico Cimarosa (1749–1801), composer; a leading representative of the opera buffa. Among his numerous works, Il matrimonio segreto (1792) is universally renowned
- Baldassare Galuppi (1706–1784), composer whose comic operas won him the title father of the opera buffa."
- Mauro Giuliani (1781–1829), the most important guitarist and composer of guitar music of his time
- Niccolò Jommelli (1714–1774), composer of religious music and operas, an innovator in his use of the orchestra
- Giovanni Battista Martini (1706–1784), composer, music theorist, and music historian who was internationally renowned as a teacher
- Giovanni Paisiello (1740–1816), one of the most successful and influential opera composers of his time. He composed more than 80 operas, including a very popular Barber of Seville (1782)
- Niccolò Piccinni (1728–1800), composer of more than 100 operas. His most famous opera was La buona figliuola (1760), which established him as one of the leading composers of his day
- Antonio Salieri (1750–1825), composer whose operas were acclaimed throughout Europe in the late 18th century
- Giovanni Battista Sammartini (1700/1701–1775), composer who was an important formative influence on the pre-Classical symphony
- Tommaso Traetta (1727–1779), composer, he was responsible of operatic reforms including reducing the ornateness of style and the primacy of star singers
- Giovanni Battista Viotti (1755–1824), violinist and composer, principal founder of the 19th-century school of violin playing

==== Romantic ====
- Vincenzo Bellini (1801–1835), opera composer. His most celebrated works are the operas La sonnambula and Norma (both 1831)
- Arrigo Boito (1842–1918), composer and poet. He is remembered for his opera Mefistofele (1868)
- Alfredo Catalani (1854–1893), composer of the popular opera La Wally (1892). His operas were among the most important in the period preceding the verismo school
- Luigi Cherubini (1760–1842), composer, who lived in Paris after 1788. Of his nearly 40 operas, the most popular were Lodoïska (1791), Médée (1797), and Les deux journées (1800)
- Muzio Clementi (1752–1832), composer, pianist, organist and teacher who is acknowledged as the first to write specifically for the piano
- Gaetano Donizetti (1797–1848), opera composer. Among his major works are Lucia di Lammermoor (1835), La fille du régiment (1840), and La favorite (1840)
- Ruggero Leoncavallo (1857–1919), opera composer whose fame rests on the opera Pagliacci (1892)
- Pietro Mascagni (1863–1945), operatic composer, one of the principal exponents of verismo. Mascagni came up with his masterpiece Cavalleria rusticana in 1890 to tremendous success
- Saverio Mercadante (1795–1870), composer, teacher and orchestrator. He is considered to have been an important reformer of Italian opera
- Giuseppe Martucci (1856–1909), composer, conductor, pianist and teacher. Sometimes called "the Italian Brahms"
- Niccolò Paganini (1782–1840), composer and principal violin virtuoso of the 19th century
- Amilcare Ponchielli (1834–1886), composer, known for his opera La Gioconda (1876)
- Claudio Rebagliati Ricaldone (1843 -1909), violinist, composer migrated in Peru
- Gioachino Rossini (1792–1868), composer nicknamed "The Italian Mozart". Operas include: The Barber of Seville (1816), La Cenerentola (1817), and Semiramide (1823)
- Gaspare Spontini (1774–1851), composer and conductor. His most acclaimed work was La Vestale (1807)
- Giuseppe Verdi (1813–1901), leading Italian composer of opera in the 19th century, noted for operas such as Rigoletto (1851), La traviata (1853), Aida (1871) and Otello (1887) among others

==== The 1900s ====
- Alfredo Antonini (1901–1983), conductor and composer who was active on the CBS radio and television networks from the 1930s through the early 1970s
- Pippo Barzizza (1902–1994), composer, arranger, conductor and music director
- Luciano Berio (1925–2003), musician, whose success as theorist, conductor, composer, and teacher placed him among the leading representatives of the musical avant-garde
- Ferruccio Busoni (1866–1924), pianist and composer who attained fame as a pianist of brilliance and intellectual power
- Bruno Canfora (1924–2017), composer and conductor
- Mario Castelnuovo-Tedesco (1895–1968), composer in the Neoromantic style. Literature and Judaism were influential in his compositions
- Vito Carnevali (1888 – c. 1960) composer of choral music for the Roman Catholic Church
- Francesco Cilea (1866–1950), composer whose operas are distinguished by their melodic charm. known for Adriana Lecouvreur (1902)
- Luigi Dallapiccola (1904–1975), composer known for his lyrical twelve-tone compositions
- Lorenzo Ferrero (born 1951), composer. Among his major works are the operas Salvatore Giuliano (1986), La Conquista (2005), and Risorgimento! (2011)
- Daniele Gatti (born 1961), he is currently chief conductor of Maggio Musicale Fiorentino
- Umberto Giordano (1867–1948), opera composer in the verismo, or "realist", style, known for his opera Andrea Chénier (1896)
- Ruggero Leoncavallo (1857–1919), composer and opera librettist. Although he produced numerous operas and other songs it is his opera Pagliacci (1892) that remained his lasting contribution
- Bruno Maderna (1920–1973), composer and conductor. In 1955 he founded the Studio di fonologia musicale di Radio Milano with Luciano Berio disseminating contemporary music in Italy.
- Pietro Mascagni (1863–1945), opera composer, famous for Cavalleria rusticana, one of the classic verismo operas
- Gian Carlo Menotti (1911–2007), composer, librettist, director, and playwright who is primarily known for his output of 25 operas
- Giorgio Moroder (born 1940), composer and conductor. The father of Disco Music
- Ennio Morricone (1928–2020), composer and conductor. He is considered one of the most prolific and influential film composers of his era
- Luigi Nono (1924–1990), leading Italian composer of electronic, aleatory, and serial music
- Riz Ortolani (1926–2014), composer and conductor. He scored over 200 films and television programs in 2013, he received a Lifetime Achievement from the World Soundtrack Academy.
- Goffredo Petrassi (1904–2003), composer of modern classical music, conductor, and teacher
- Lorenzo Perosi (1873–1956), composer of sacred music and the only member of the Giovane Scuola who did not write opera.
- Piero Piccioni (1921–2004), composer, pianist, organist, conductor, lawyer, he was also the prolific author of more than 300 film soundtracks
- Giacomo Puccini (1858–1924), composer of operas. His finest operas, La bohème (1896), Tosca (1900), Madama Butterfly (1904), and Turandot (produced posthumously in 1926)
- Ottorino Respighi (1879–1936), composer, known for colourful tone poems The Fountains of Rome (1916) and The Pines of Rome (1924)
- Nino Rota (1911–1979), composer of film scores, notably for the films of Federico Fellini, Francis Ford Coppola and Luchino Visconti
- Renato Serio (born 1946), composer, conductor and arranger.

=== Conductors ===
- Claudio Abbado (1933–2014), conductor. Principal conductor of the London Symphony Orchestra (1979–88); director of the Vienna State Opera (1986–91), and the Berlin Philharmonic (1989–2001)
- Salvatore Accardo (born 1941), violinist and conductor, who is known for his interpretations of the works of Niccolò Paganini.
- Alfredo Antonini (1901–1983), leading symphony conductor and composer who was active on the international concert stage as well as on the CBS radio and television
- Enrico Bevignani (1841–1903), conductor, harpsichordist, composer, chief conductor at the Royal Opera House, La Fenice, Mariinsky Theatre and the Bolshoi where notably conducted the world premiere of Pyotr Tchaikovsky's Eugene Onegin in 1879.
- Ferruccio Busoni (1866–1924), pianist, conductor and composer who attained fame as a pianist of brilliance and intellectual power
- Guido Cantelli (1920–1956), conductor. Arturo Toscanini elected him his "spiritual heir" since the beginnings of his career
- Primo Casale (1904–1981), conductor, composer, and violinist. Promotor of the opera in Venezuela since 1948
- Riccardo Chailly (born 1953), conductor known for his devotion to contemporary music, and for his attempts to modernize approaches to the traditional symphonic repertory
- Riccardo Drigo (1846–1930), conductor, composer of ballet music and Italian opera, and a pianist.
- Victor de Sabata (1892–1967), conductor and composer. He is widely recognized as one of the most distinguished operatic conductors of the 20th century
- Piero Gamba (1936–2022), also known as Pierino Gamba, orchestral conductor and pianist. Gamba came to attention as a child prodigy.
- Daniele Gatti (born 1961), conductor. He is considered the foremost conductor of his generation"
- Franco Ferrara (1911–1985), conductor and teacher ofvarious prominent conductors, including Roberto Abbado, Riccardo Chailly, Andrew Davis and Riccardo Muti
- Gianandrea Gavazzeni (1909–1996), conductor of opera
- Carlo Maria Giulini (1914–2005), conductor esteemed for his skills in directing both grand opera and symphony orchestras
- Vittorio Gui (1885–1975), conductor, composer, musicologist and critic
- Fabio Luisi (born 1959), conductor of the Vienna Symphony and the Staatskapelle Dresden
- Gianandrea Noseda (born 1964), conductor of the National Symphony Orchestra of Washington D.C.
- Mantovani (1905–1980), known mononymously as Mantovani, conductor, composer and light orchestra-styled entertainer with a cascading strings musical signature
- Francesco Molinari-Pradelli (1911–1996). prominent opera conductor
- Riccardo Muti (born 1941), conductor of both opera and the symphonic repertory. He became one of the most respected and charismatic conductors of his generation
- Giorgio Polacco (1875–1960), conductor of the Metropolitan Opera from 1915 to 1917 and the Chicago Civic Opera from 1921 to 1930
- Claudio Scimone (1934–2018), conductor. He founded I Solisti Veneti in 1959, specializing in 18th-century and 20th-century Italian music
- Tullio Serafin (1878–1968), conductor. An outstanding conductor of Italian opera, he did much to foster the revival of interest in Bellini and Donizetti
- Giuseppe Sinopoli (1946–2001), performed with an intensity and daring that made him one of Europe's most controversial orchestra leaders
- Arturo Toscanini (1867–1957), conductor, considered one of the great virtuoso conductors of the first half of the 20th century
- Carlo Zecchi (1903–1984), conductor, pianist and music teacher

=== Singers ===
- Adamo (born 1943) – singer
- Annalisa (born 1985) – singer/songwriter
- Alexia (born 1967) – singer/songwriter
- Alessandra Amoroso (born 1986) – singer/songwriter
- Annalisa (born 1985) – singer/songwriter
- Renzo Arbore (born 1937) – singer, musician TV presenter
- Arisa (born 1982) – singer/songwriter
- Anna Azerli (born 1989) – pop-opera singer
- Bianca Atzei (born 1987) – singer/songwriter
- Serena Autieri (born 1976) – singer/songwriter
- Malika Ayane (born 1984) – singer/songwriter
- Baby K (born 1983) – singer/songwriter
- Umberto Balsamo (born 1943) – singer
- Paolo Beccaria – singer
- Carla Boni (1925–2009) – singer
- Carla Bruni (born 1967) – singer/songwriter
- Bassi Maestro (born 1973) – rapper
- Claudio Baglioni (born 1951) – singer/songwriter
- Franco Battiato (1945–2021) – singer/songwriter, composer
- Lucio Battisti (1943–1998) – singer/songwriter
- Andrea Bocelli (born 1958) – gospel singer/tenor
- Fred Bongusto (1935–2019) – singer/songwriter
- Alessandra Belloni (born 1954) – singer, drummer, dancer, teacher
- Primo Brown (1976–2016) – rapper
- Edoardo Bennato (born 1946) – singer/songwriter
- Eugenio Bennato (born 1948) – singer/songwriter
- Loredana Bertè (born 1950) – performer
- Orietta Berti (born 1943) – singer
- Carla Bissi (Alice) (1954) – singer/songwriter
- Andrea Bocelli (born 1958), opera tenor noted for his unique blend of opera and pop music
- Angelo Branduardi (born 1950) – singer/songwriter
- Michele Bravi (born 1994) – singer/songwriter
- Sergio Bruni (1921–2003), singer, guitarist, and songwriter. He was often called The Voice of Naples
- Fred Buscaglione (1921–1960) – singer/songwriter
- Carlo Buti (1902–1963) – singer. He was known as The Golden Voice of Italy
- Clementino (born 1982) – rapper
- Coez (born 1983) – singer/rapper
- Andrea Caccese (born 1988) − singer/songwriter
- Renato Carosone (1920–2001) – singer/songwriter
- Caterina Caselli (born 1946) – singer
- Raffaella Carrà (1943–2021) – singer/songwriter
- Albano Carrisi (born 1943) – singer/songwriter
- Marco Carta (born 1985) – singer/songwriter
- Janalynn Castelino (born 1998), singer/songwriter and doctor
- Mimmo Cavallo (born 1951), singer-songwriter and composer
- Adriano Celentano (born 1938) – singer/songwriter
- Giovanni Caccamo (born 1991) – pop singer
- Gigliola Cinquetti (born 1947) – singer/songwriter
- Chiara (born 1986) – singer/songwriter
- Riccardo Cocciante (born 1946) – singer/songwriter
- Lodovica Comello (born 1990) – singer/songwriter
- Paolo Conte (born 1937) – singer/songwriter
- Tony Croatto (1940–2005) – singer/songwriter
- Toto Cutugno (1943–2023) – singer/songwriter
- Lorella Cuccarini (born 1965) – singer/songwriter
- Betty Curtis (1936–2006) – singer
- Lucio Dalla (1943–2012) – singer/songwriter
- Tony Dallara (born 1936)– singer
- Pino Daniele (1955–2015) – singer/songwriter
- Gigi D'Alessio (born 1967) – singer/songwriter
- Dargen D'Amico (born 1980) – rapper/singer
- Pino D'Angiò (born 1952) – singer
- Cristina D'Avena (born 1964) – singer
- Fabrizio De André (1940–1999) – singer/songwriter
- Francesco De Gregori (born 1951) – singer/songwriter
- Roberto Demo (born 1965) – singer/songwriter
- Fred De Palma (born 1989) – rapper
- Manuel De Peppe (born 1970) – singer/songwriter
- Teresa De Sio (born 1955) – singer/songwriter
- Franco De Vita (born 1954) – singer/songwriter
- Nicola Di Bari (born 1940) – singer/songwriter
- Peppino di Capri (born 1939) – singer/songwriter
- Evio di Marzo (1954-2016) – singer/songwriter
- Aldo Donà (1922–2011) – singer/songwriter
- Pino Donaggio (born 1941) – singer
- Aldo Donati (1947–2014) – singer/songwriter
- Johnny Dorelli (born 1937) – singer
- Egreen (born 1984) – rapper
- Elisa (born 1977) – singer/songwriter
- Sergio Endrigo (1933–2005) – singer/songwriter
- El Presidente (born 1972) – rapper
- En?gma (born 1988) – rapper
- Ensi (born 1985) – rapper
- Fabri Fibra (born 1976) – rapper
- Fedez (born 1989) – rapper
- Nino Ferrer (1934–1998) – singer
- Bruno Filippini (born 1945) – singer
- Rosario Fiorello (born 1960) – singer/songwriter
- Gabriella Ferri (1942–2004) – singer/songwriter
- Giusy Ferreri (born 1979) – singer/songwriter
- Tiziano Ferro (born 1980) – singer/songwriter
- Eugenio Finardi (born 1952) – singer/songwriter
- Fiordaliso(born 1956) – singer
- Riccardo Fogli (born 1947) – singer/songwriter
- Jimmy Fontana (1934–2013) – singer/songwriter
- Ivano Fossati (born 1951) – singer/songwriter
- Rosanna Fratello (born in 1951) – singer and actress
- Gemitaiz (born 1988) – rapper
- Gué Pequeno (born 1980) – rapper
- Giorgio Gaber (1939–2003) – singer/songwriter
- Francesco Gabbani (born 1982) – singer/songwriter
- Rino Gaetano (1950–1981) – singer/songwriter
- Giorgia (born 1971) – singer/songwriter
- Enrico Gentile (born 1921)– singer. In 1940 he founded a vocal quartet named Quartetto Cetra
- Wilma Goich(born 1945) – singer
- Irene Grandi (born 1969) – singer/songwriter
- Rocco Granata (born 1938) – singer/songwriter
- Francesco Guccini (born 1940) – singer/songwriter
- J-Ax (born 1972) – rapper
- Jovanotti (born 1966) – singer/songwriter and rapper
- Enzo Jannacci (1935–2013) – singer/songwriter
- Gorni Kramer (1913–1995)– singer/songwriter
- Emis Killa (born 1989) – rapper
- Achille Lauro (born 1990) – rapper/singer
- Rudy La Scala (born 1954) – singer/songwriter and record producer
- Bruno Lauzi (1937–2006) – singer/songwriter
- Fausto Leali (born 1944) – singer/songwriter
- Luciano Ligabue (born 1960) – singer/songwriter
- MadMan (born 1988) – rapper
- Mahmood (born 1992) – singer/songwriter
- Marracash (born 1979) – rapper
- Cristiano Malgioglio (born 1945) – singer/songwriter
- Pablo Manavello (1950–2016) – singer/songwriter
- Fiorella Mannoia (born 1954) – performer
- Marino Marini (1924–1997)- singer and musician
- Emma Marrone (born 1984) – singer/songwriter
- Mia Martini (1947–1995) – singer/performer
- Marco Masini (born 1964) – singer-songwriter, pianist
- Paolo Meneguzzi (born 1976) – singer/songwriter
- Marco Mengoni (born 1988) – singer/songwriter
- Francesca Michielin (born 1995) – singer/songwriter
- Milva (1939–2021) – performer
- Mina (born 1940) – performer
- Moreno (born 1989) – rapper/singer
- Domenico Modugno (1928–1994) – singer/songwriter
- Yves Montand (1921–1991) – singer/songwriter
- Gianni Morandi (born 1944) – performer
- Fabrizio Moro (born 1975) – singer/songwriter
- Franco Mussida (Premiata Forneria Marconi) (born 1947) – singer/songwriter
- Gianna Nannini (born 1954) – singer/songwriter
- Neffa (born 1967) – rapper/singer/songwriter
- Nek (born 1972) – singer/songwriter
- Nesli (born 1980) – rapper
- Noemi (born 1982) – singer/songwriter
- Nitro (born 1993) – rapper
- Natalino Otto (1912–1969) - singer/songwriter
- Gino Paoli (1934–2026) – singer/songwriter
- Laura Pausini (born 1974) – singer/songwriter
- Rita Pavone (born 1946) – singer
- Emilio Pericoli (1928–2013) – singer
- Piero (born 1945) – singer/songwriter
- Nilla Pizzi (1919–2011) – singer
- Povia (born 1972) – singer/songwriter
- Patty Pravo (born 1948) – singer
- Pupo(born 1955), singer, lyricist, television presenter, writer and voice actor
- Alberto Rabagliati (1906–1974) – singer
- Rancore (born 1989) – rapper
- Rocco Hunt (born 1994) – rapper/singer
- Katyna Ranieri (1925–2018) – singer
- Massimo Ranieri (born 1951) – singer
- Eros Ramazzotti (born 1963) – singer/songwriter
- Mino Reitano (1944–2009) – singer/songwriter
- Tony Renis (born 1938) – singer
- Donatella Rettore (born 1953) – singer/songwriter
- Raffaele Riefoli (born 1959) – singer/songwriter
- Stefano Righi (born 1969) – singer/songwriter
- Vasco Rossi (born 1952) – singer/songwriter
- Fabio Rovazzi (born 1994) – rapper/singer
- Enrico Ruggeri (born 1957) – singer/songwriter
- Antonella Ruggiero (born 1952) – performer
- Giuni Russo (1951–2004) – singer/songwriter
- Salmo (born 1984) – rapper
- Paolo Salvatore (1941–2007), singer
- Flo Sandon's (1924–2006), singer
- Shade (born 1987) – rapper
- Valerio Scanu (born 1990) – singer/songwriter
- Slut Boy Billy (born 1998) - hip-pop, punk rap and trap rapper
- Bobby Solo (born 1945) – singer/songwriter
- Demetrio Stratos (Area) (1945–1973) – singer/songwriter
- Aldo Tagliapietra (Le Orme) (1945) – singer/songwriter
- Luigi Tenco (1938–1967) – singer/songwriter
- Little Tony (1941–2013) – singer/songwriter
- Alberto Urso (born 1997) – outstanding high sing tenor, singer
- Vacca (born 1979) – rapper
- Giada Valenti – singer/songwriter
- Ornella Vanoni (1934–2025) – singer
- Roberto Vecchioni (born 1943) – singer/songwriter
- Antonello Venditti (born 1949) – singer/songwriter
- Gioconda Vessichelli (21st-century) – opera singer and actress
- Edoardo Vianello (born 1938) – singer/songwriter
- Claudio Villa (1926–1987) – singer
- Yordano (born 1951) – singer/songwriter
- Iva Zanicchi(born 1940) – singer
- Renato Zero (born 1950) – singer/songwriter
- Zucchero (born 1955) – singer/songwriter

==== Castrati singers ====
- Antonio Baldi (fl. 1714 – c. 1735), alto castrato who created roles in the premieres of several operas by Handel
- Antonio Bernacchi (1685–1756), contralto castrato, sang in operas throughout Italy and also abroad, notably at Munich and for Handel in London
- Caffarelli (1710–1783), contralto castrato. A pupil of Nicola Porpora; he sang for Handel in London, England, in 1738, creating the title roles in Faramondo and Serse
- Giovanni Carestini (c. 1704 – c. 1760), contralto castrato, one of the foremost of his time. Début Rome 1721
- Girolamo Crescentini (1762–1846), mezzo-soprano castrato. His repertory being chiefly operas by Zingarelli, Cimarosa and Gazzaniga
- Farinelli (1705–1782), both soprano and contralto
- Giacinto Fontana, called "Farfallino" (1692–1739), soprano castrato. He was active primarily in Rome, specialized in performing female roles (women were not permitted to appear onstage in the Papal States)
- Nicolò Grimaldi (1673–1732), mezzo-soprano castrato known for his association with the composer George Frideric Handel, in two of whose early operas he sang
- Giovanni Francesco Grossi (1653–1697), soprano castrato. He sang Siface in Cavalli's Scipione affricano (1671) and was thereafter always known by that name
- Gaetano Guadagni (1728–1792), contralto castrato, known for singing the role of Orpheus at the premiere of Gluck's opera Orfeo ed Euridice in 1762
- Giuseppe Millico, called "Il Moscovita" (1737–1802), soprano castrato, known for his association with the composer Christoph Willibald Gluck, he performed in all the latter's reform operas.
- Alessandro Moreschi (1858–1922), soprano castrato, known as the angel of Rome "because of vocal purity
- Gaspare Pacchierotti (1740–1821), soprano castrato, one of the most famous singers of his time
- Senesino (1686–1758), contralto castrato, renowned for his power and his skill in both coloratura and expressive singing
- Giovanni Velluti (1780–1861), soprano. The last of the leading castrate singers

==== Sopranos ====
- Gemma Bellincioni (1864–1950), opera singer, soprano
- Maria Caniglia (1905–1979), soprano; one of the leading Italian dramatic sopranos of the 1930s and 1940s
- Mariella Devia (born 1948), after beginning her forty-five-year-long career as a lyric coloratura soprano, in recent years she has enjoyed success with some of the most dramatic roles in the bel canto repertoire.
- Mirella Freni (1935–2020), soprano; one of the dominant figures on the opera scene; she has since performed at many venues, including Milan, Vienna and Salzburg
- Adalgisa Gabbi (1857–1933), operatic soprano
- Cecilia Gasdia (born 1960), operatic soprano.
- Amelita Galli-Curci (1882–1963), coloratura soprano
- Giulia Grisi (1811–1869), operatic soprano whose brilliant dramatic voice established her as an operatic prima donna for more than 30 years
- Fausta Labia (1870–1935), operatic soprano
- Claudia Muzio (1889–1936), operatic soprano, whose international career was among the most successful of the early 20th century. She brought drama and pathos to all her roles
- Giuditta Pasta (1797–1865), soprano. She was famed for her roles in the operas of Rossini, Bellini and Donizetti; acclaimed for her vocal range and expressiveness
- Adelina Patti (1843–1919), soprano; one of the great coloratura singers of the 19th century
- Amelia Pinto (1876–1946), remembered for Wagner and Puccini performances
- Renata Scotto (born 1934), soprano and opera director; considered one of the preeminent singers of her generation, specializing in the bel canto repertoire
- Renata Tebaldi (1922–2004), lyric soprano; one of the most acclaimed members of the Metropolitan Opera company from 1955 to 1973, and retired from singing in 1976
- Luisa Tetrazzini (1871–1940), coloratura soprano; one of the finest of her time

==== Mezzo-sopranos ====
- Cecilia Bartoli (born 1966), operatic mezzo-soprano who achieved global stardom with her outstanding vocal skills
- Faustina Bordoni (1697–1781), mezzo-soprano; known for her beauty and acting as well as her vocal range and breath control
- Fiorenza Cossotto (born 1935), mezzo-soprano; she is considered by many to be one of the great mezzo-sopranos of the 20th century
- Armida Parsi-Pettinella (1868–1949), successful at the Scala, especially as Dalila
- Giulietta Simionato (1910–2010), mezzo-soprano who excelled at bel canto and lighter operas by Rossini and Mozart
- Ebe Stignani (1903/1904–1974), mezzo-soprano; member of the Scala ensemble and was regarded as its leading exponent of dramatic contralto and mezzo roles
- Lucia Valentini Terrani (1946–1998), mezzo-soprano, she was particularly associated with Rossini roles

==== Contraltos ====
- Marietta Alboni (1823–1894), operatic contralto known for her classic Italian bel canto
- Clorinda Corradi (1804–1877), opera singer; one of the most famous contraltos in history
- Giuseppina Grassini (1773–1850), noted Italian contralto and a singing teacher

==== Tenors ====
- Giovanni Ansani (1744–1826), operatic tenor
- Giuseppe Anselmi (1876–1929), operatic tenor
- Daniele Barioni (1930–2022), lyric tenor
- Carlo Bergonzi (1924–2014), lyric tenor; from 1956 to 1983, his beautiful voice was a fixture in the 19th-century Italian and French repertoire at the Metropolitan Opera
- Alessandro Bonci (1870–1940), leggero tenor
- Franco Bonisolli (1938–2003), lyric tenor
- Dino Borgioli (1891–1960), lyric tenor
- Enrico Caruso (1873–1921), lyric tenor, particularly associated with Verismo operas, and first successful recorded tenor of history
- Franco Corelli (1921–2003), spinto tenor; powerful voice and passionate singing style; had a major international opera career between 1951 and 1976
- Carlo Cossutta (1932–2000), dramatic tenor
- Giacomo David (1750–1830), operatic tenor
- Giovanni David (1790–1864), operatic tenor
- Giovanni Matteo De Candia (1810–1883), operatic tenor mostly known with his stage name as "Mario", married with soprano Giulia Grisi
- Fernando De Lucia (1860–1925), operatic tenor and singing teacher who enjoyed an international career
- Mario Del Monaco (1915–1982), dramatic tenor
- Bernardo De Muro (1881–1955), operatic tenor
- Enzo de Muro Lomanto (1902–1952), lyric tenor
- Giuseppe Di Stefano (1921–2008), lyric tenor who was hailed as one of the finest operatic tenors of his generation
- Domenico Donzelli (1790–1873), operatic tenor
- Mario Filippeschi (1907–1979), lyric tenor
- Salvatore Fisichella (1943), lyric-leggero tenor
- Sergio Franchi (1926–1999), film actor and tenor
- Beniamino Gigli (1890–1957), lyric-leggero tenor. The most famous tenor of his generation; was a leading in French and Italian operas from 1920 to 1932
- Giacomo Lauri-Volpi (1892–1979), lyric-spinto tenor; he performed throughout Europe and the Americas in a top-class career that spanned 40 years
- Francesco Marconi (1853–1916), lyric-spinto tenor
- Giovanni Martinelli (1885–1969), spinto tenor; his repertoire of about 50 roles included the leading tenor roles in nearly all the principal Italian operas
- Francesco Merli (1887–1976), dramatic tenor
- Pier Miranda Ferraro (1924–2008), lyric-dramatic tenor
- Nicola Monti (1920–1993), leggero tenor
- Andrea Nozzari (1776–1832), operatic tenor
- Luciano Pavarotti (1935–2007), lyric-leggero tenor
- Aureliano Pertile (1885–1952), lyric-dramatic tenor; one of the most important of the entire 20th century
- Arrigo Pola (1919–1999), lyric tenor
- Giacinto Prandelli (1914–2010), lyric tenor
- Gianni Raimondi (1923–2008), lyric-spinto tenor, particularly associated with the Italian repertory
- Giovanni Battista Rubini (1794–1854), operatic tenor; known for playing heroic roles
- Giovanni Sbriglia (1832–1916), operatic tenor
- Tito Schipa (1888–1965), leggero tenor; considered one of the finest tenore di grazia in operatic history
- Roberto Stagno (1840–1897), lyric tenor
- Ferruccio Tagliavini (1913–1995), lyric-leggero tenor
- Francesco Tamagno (1850–1905), lyric-spinto tenor; became famous for his performances in the title roles of Verdi's Otello and Don Carlos
- Enrico Tamberlik (1820–1889), operatic tenor
- Cesare Valletti (1922–2000), leggero tenor
- Giovanni Zenatello (1876–1949), dramatic tenor

==== Baritones ====
- Pasquale Amato (1878–1942), operatic baritone; from 1908 to 1921 he sang leading baritone roles at the Metropolitan Opera
- Ettore Bastianini (1922–1967), operatic baritone; was particularly associated with the operas of Verdi
- Mattia Battistini (1856–1928), operatic baritone; a great master of bel canto
- Renato Bruson (born 1934), operatic baritone; one of the most important Verdi baritones of the late 20th and early 21st century
- Piero Cappuccilli (1926–2005), operatic baritone; enjoyed a 35-year career during which he was widely regarded as the leading Italian baritone of his generation
- Antonio Cotogni (1831–1918), operatic baritone
- Giuseppe De Luca (1876–1950), operatic baritone
- Tito Gobbi (1913–1984), operatic baritone; he sang in most of the great opera houses and was acclaimed for his acting ability
- Rolando Panerai (1924–2019), baritone; début Florence (1946) with Lucia di Lammermoor
- Giorgio Ronconi (1810–1890), operatic baritone; one of the most popular artists on the lyric stage until his retirement in 1866
- Titta Ruffo (1877–1953), operatic baritone
- Antonio Scotti (1866–1936), baritone a principal artist of the New York Metropolitan Opera for more than 33 seasons, but also sang with great success at London's Royal Opera House, Covent Garden, and Milan's La Scala
- Giuseppe Taddei (1916–2010), baritone; he has performed more than 100 operatic roles over six decades

==== Basses ====
- Salvatore Baccaloni (1900–1969), operatic bass; known for his large repertory, he sang nearly 170 roles in five languages
- Sesto Bruscantini (1919–2003), operatic bass-baritone, buffo singer
- Enzo Dara (1938–2017), bass buffo; one of the foremost performers of his generation
- Nazzareno De Angelis (1881–1962), operatic bass, particularly associated with Verdi, Rossini and Wagner roles
- Ferruccio Furlanetto (born 1949), bass; known as a brilliant interpreter in the Italian repertoire and as a Mozart-singer
- Luigi Lablache (1794–1858), operatic bass admired for his musicianship and acting
- Paolo Montarsolo (1925–2006), operatic bass particularly associated with buffo roles
- Tancredi Pasero (1893–1983), bass; particularly associated with the Italian repertory
- Ezio Pinza (1892–1957), leading basso at the Metropolitan Opera House in New York City (1926–1948)
- Cesare Siepi (1923–2010), bass singer who won over audiences worldwide in signature roles such as Don Giovanni and Figaro in The Marriage of Figaro

== Painters ==
=== Ancient Rome ===
- Amulius (1st century AD), Roman painter. One of the principal painters of the Domus Aurea
- Furius Dionysius Philocalus (4th century AD), Roman chronograph and painter
- Pacuvius (220–130 BC), Roman writer and painter
- Studius (1st century BC and 1st century AD), Roman painter of the Augustan period

=== Middle Ages ===
- Altichiero (c. 1330 – c. 1390), painter who was the effective founder of the Veronese school and perhaps the most significant northern Italian artist of the 14th century
- Bonaventura Berlinghieri (fl. 1235–1244), painter of the Gothic period. His most celebrated work is St. Francis of Assisi (1235); one of the earliest icons of the Saint
- Pietro Cavallini (c. 1250 – c. 1330), painter and mosaicist. His surviving works are frescoes in Santa Cecilia in Trastevere and in Santa Maria Donna Regina Vecchia
- Cimabue (before 1251–1302), painter and mosaicist. Among his works may be cited the Sta. Trinità Madonna (c. 1290) and the Madonna Enthroned with St. Francis (c. 1290–95)
- Coppo di Marcovaldo (fl. 1260–1276), painter, one of the earliest about whom there is a body of documented knowledge. His one signed work is the Madonna del Bordone (1261)
- Bernardo Daddi (c. 1280–1348), painter, the outstanding painter in Florence in the period after the death of Giotto (who was possibly his teacher)
- Duccio (fl. 1278–1319), painter. Founder of the Sienese school. His most celebrated work is a large altar called the Maestà (1308–1311) in the Siena Cathedral
- Taddeo Gaddi (c. 1300–1366), painter and architect, known for the fresco series Life of the Virgin (completed in 1338)
- Giottino (fl. 1324–1369), painter of the school of Giotto. He has been credited with frescoes in Basilica of Santa Croce, Florence, and in the Lower Church of St. Francis in Assisi
- Giotto di Bondone (1266/7–1337), painter, the first of the great Italian masters. His work includes cycles of frescoes in Assisi, the Arena Chapel in Padua and the Church of Santa Croce
- Guido of Siena (13th century), painter. One of the innovators in Italian art after the dominance of the Byzantine style
- Ambrogio Lorenzetti (c. 1290–1348), painter of the Sienese school. Known for the cycle of frescoes (1337–39) in the Palazzo Pubblico, Siena
- Pietro Lorenzetti (c. 1280–1348), painter of the Sienese school. His Nativity of the Virgin (c. 1335–1342), is notable for his handling of perspective
- Simone Martini (c. 1284–1344), painter, important exponent of Gothic art. Among his works may be cited the Maestà fresco (1315) and Annunciation and two Saints (1333)
- Lippo Memmi (c. 1291–1356), painter from Siena. One of the artists who worked at the Orvieto Cathedral, for which he finished the Madonna dei Raccomandati (c. 1320)
- Orcagna (c. 1308–1368), painter, sculptor and architect. He was one of the leading artists of his day
- Paolo Veneziano (fl. 1333–1358), painter and possibly illuminator. He was by far the most prolific and influential Venetian painter of the early 14th century
- Giunta Pisano (fl. 1236–1255), painter. Three large Crucifixions are ascribed to the same master, whose signature can be traced on them
- Piero da Rimini, early 14th century, painter.
- Jacopo Torriti (fl. 1270–1300), painter and mosaicist. His work is now known only from two highly prominent signed apse mosaics in the basilicas of St. John Lateran and Santa Maria Maggiore

=== Renaissance and Mannerism ===
- Mariotto Albertinelli (1474–1515), painter, known for The Visitation (1503) and The Annunciation (1510)
- Alessandro Allori (1535–1607), painter. His varied output included altarpieces, portraits, and tapestry designs. The Pearl Fishing (1570–1572) is generally considered his masterpiece
- Andrea del Castagno (c. 1421–1457), painter in the early Florentine Renaissance. Known for a series of monumental frescoes depicting the Last Supper
- Andrea del Sarto (1486–1530), painter. His most striking among other well-known works is the series of frescoes on the life of St. John the Baptist in the Chiostro dello Scalzo (c. 1515–1526)
- Andrea del Verrocchio (c. 1435–1488), sculptor and painter. Among his principal paintings are Baptism of Christ (1472–1475) and several versions of the Madonna and Child
- Sofonisba Anguissola (c. 1535–1625), painter, mainly of portraits, the first woman artist to win international renown
- Antonello da Messina (c. 1430–1479), Sicilian painter. Major works were altarpieces and portraits
- Antonio da Correggio (1489–1534), painter, known for the frescoes in the domes of San Giovanni Evangelista and the Cathedral of Parma, where he worked from 1520 to 1530
- Giuseppe Arcimboldo (1527–1593), painter, famous for his allegorical or symbolical compositions in which he arranged objects such as fruits and vegetables into the form of the human face
- Alesso Baldovinetti (1425–1499), painter. He contributed importantly to the fledgling art of landscape painting
- Jacopo de' Barbari (c. 1440–before 1516), painter and printmaker. His few surviving paintings (about twelve) include the first known example of trompe-l'œil since antiquity
- Federico Barocci (c. 1526–1612), leading painter of the central Italian school in the last decades of the 16th century and an important precursor of the Baroque style
- Jacopo Bassano (c. 1510–1592), painter of the Venetian school, known for his religious paintings, lush landscapes, and scenes of everyday life
- Domenico di Pace Beccafumi (1486–1551), painter, sculptor, draughtsman, printmaker and illuminator. He was one of the protagonists of Tuscan Mannerism
- Gentile Bellini (c. 1429–1507), painter, member of the founding family of the Venetian school of Renaissance painting, known for his portraiture and his scenes of Venice
- Giovanni Bellini (c. 1430–1516), painter. Among his works may be cited St. Francis in Ecstasy (c. 1480) and Portrait of Doge Leonardo Loredan (1501)
- Jacopo Bellini (c. 1400 – c. 1470), painter who introduced the principles of Florentine early Renaissance art into Venice
- Ambrogio Bergognone (c. 1470 – 1523–1524), painter. His most important works are the frescoes in the Certosa di Pavia
- Boccaccio Boccaccino (c. 1467 – c. 1525), painter. His most impressive work is the fresco cycle of the Life of the Virgin along the nave in the cathedral at Cremona
- Giovanni Antonio Boltraffio (1466/1467–1516), painter. He was a pupil of Leonardo da Vinci, whose style he adhered to faithfully
- Paris Bordone (1500–1571), painter of religious, mythological, and anecdotal subjects, known for his striking sexualized paintings of women
- Sandro Botticelli (c. 1445–1510), painter of the Florentine school. The Primavera (c. 1482) and The Birth of Venus (c. 1486) rank now among the most familiar masterpieces of Florentine art
- Francesco Botticini (1446–1498), painter profoundly influenced by Castagno; worked under and was formed by Cosimo Rosselli and Verrocchio
- Bramantino (c. 1456 – c. 1530), painter and architect, a follower of Bramante, from whom he takes his nickname
- Bronzino (1503–1572), painter. He is noted chiefly for his stylized portraits. Of his religious works, Deposition of Christ (1540–1545) is the most famous
- Luca Cambiasi (1527–1585), painter and draughtsman. He was the outstanding Genoese painter of the 16th century
- Vittore Carpaccio (c. 1460 – 1525–1526), painter active in Venice, known for the cycle depicting the life of Saint Ursula and the Saint George series
- Cennino Cennini (c. 1370 – c. 1440), painter, known for writing Il libro dell'arte (1437), source on the methods, techniques, and attitudes of medieval artists
- Cigoli (1559–1613), painter, draughtsman, architect and scenographer. He was one of the most influential artists in 17th-century Florence
- Cima da Conegliano (c. 1459 – c. 1517), painter of the Venetian school whose style was marked by its use of landscape and by airy, luminous colour
- Niccolò Antonio Colantonio (fl. 1440–1470), painter, based in Naples, where he painted religious paintings in a style marked by Flemish influence
- Francesco del Cossa (c. 1430 – c. 1477), painter of the Ferrarese school, best known works are the frescoes in the Palazzo Schifanoia at Ferrara (probably commissioned in 1469)
- Lorenzo Costa (1460–1535), painter of the Ferrarese and Bolognese schools, known for his painting the Madonna and Child with the Bentivoglio family (1483)
- Carlo Crivelli (c. 1435 – c. 1495), painter. All his works were of religious subjects, done in an elaborate, old-fashioned style reminiscent of the linearism of Andrea Mantegna
- Daniele da Volterra (c. 1509–1566), painter and sculptor, noted for his finely drawn, highly idealized figures done in the style of Michelangelo
- Ercole de' Roberti (c. 1451–1496), painter. His dynamic figurative compositions are marked by an exceptional intensity of feeling
- Francesco de' Rossi (1510–1563), painter and designer, one of the leading Mannerist fresco painters of the Florentine-Roman school
- Niccolò dell'Abbate (1509 or 1512–1571), painter and decorator. He is credited with introducing landscape painting in France
- Dosso Dossi (c. 1490–1542), painter and leader of the Ferrarese school in the 16th century
- Gaudenzio Ferrari (c. 1471–1546), painter and sculptor, one of the leading representatives of the Lombard school
- Rosso Fiorentino (1494–1540), painter. His masterpiece is generally considered to be the Deposition or Descent from the Cross altarpiece in the Pinacoteca Comunale di Volterra
- Lavinia Fontana (1552–1614), painter. She was one of the first women painters in European history to have enjoyed professional success
- Prospero Fontana (1512–1597), painter, father of Lavinia Fontana. One of the leading painters in Bologna
- Vincenzo Foppa (c. 1430 – c. 1515), painter, leading figure in 15th-century Lombard art
- Fra Angelico (c. 1395–1455), painter. His best-known works are frescoes at the monastery of San Marco, Florence, and in the chapel of Pope Nicholas V in the Vatican
- Fra Bartolomeo (1472–1517), painter, a leading figure of the High Renaissance. Noted for his austere religious works
- Franciabigio (1482–1525), painter, known for his portraits and religious paintings
- Agnolo Gaddi (c. 1350–1396), painter. He was an influential and prolific artist who was the last major Florentine painter stylistically descended from Giotto
- Fede Galizia (1578–1630), painter, one of the earliest still life painters in Italy, who was also known for miniature portraits, landscapes, and religious subjects
- Maria Oriana Galli Bibiena (1656–1749), painter, member of the Galli da Bibbiena family of artists of Tuscan origin, specialised in mannerist portraits and history paintings
- Gentile da Fabriano (c. 1370–1427), painter, one of the outstanding exponents of the elegant international Gothic style
- Domenico Ghirlandaio (1449–1494), painter. His most famous achievement is his fresco cycle of the life of Mary and St. John the Baptist for the choir of Santa Maria Novella (1485–1490)
- Ridolfo Ghirlandaio (1483–1561), painter. He was the son of Domenico Ghirlandaio, and was trained in his father's workshop
- Giorgione (c. 1477/8–1510), painter of the Venetian school. His The Tempest (c. 1508), a milestone in Renaissance landscape painting
- Giovanni da Udine (1487–1564), painter and architect. A pupil of Raphael and one of his assistants in painting the frescoes of the Vatican
- Giovanni di Paolo (c. 1403–1482), painter. One of the most attractive and idiosyncratic painters of the Sienese School
- Stefano di Giovanni (c. 1400–1450), painter of the Sienese school, is noted for the gentle piety of his art
- Benozzo Gozzoli (c. 1421–1497), painter. He is famous for his numerous frescos, such as The Journey of the Magi to Bethlehem (1459–1461) in the Medici Palace, Florence
- Leonardo da Vinci (1452–1519), painter, sculptor, architect, musician, engineer and scientist. The supreme example of Renaissance genius. Author of Mona Lisa (c. 1503–1506)
- Filippino Lippi (c. 1457–1504), painter. His most popular painting is the Apparition of the Virgin to St. Bernard altarpiece (1480)
- Filippo Lippi (c. 1406–1469), painter. His finest fresco cycle is in Prato cathedral and depicts the lives of St. Stephen and St. John the Baptist
- Gian Paolo Lomazzo (1538–1592), painter. His first work, Trattato dell'arte della pittura, scoltura et architettura (1584) is in part a guide to contemporary concepts of decorum
- Lorenzo di Credi (1459–1537), painter and sculptor. Examples of his art are the Madonna with Child and Two Saints and Adoration
- Lorenzo Monaco (c. 1370 – c. 1425), painter, one of the leading artists in Florence at the beginning of the 15th century
- Lorenzo Lotto (c. 1480–1556), painter known for his perceptive portraits and mystical paintings of religious subjects
- Bernardino Luini (c. 1480/1482–1532), painter, known for his mythological and religious frescoes
- Andrea Mantegna (c. 1431–1506), painter. His most important works were nine tempera pictures of Triumph of Caesar (c. 1486) and his decoration of the ceiling of the Camera degli Sposi
- Masaccio (1401–1428), painter. His most famous works are the frescoes in the Brancacci Chapel and in the church of Santa Maria del Carmine, in Florence
- Masolino da Panicale (c. 1383 – c. 1447), painter of the Florentine school. He collaborated with Masaccio, in a cycle of frescoes in the Brancacci Chapel in Santa Maria del Carmine, in Florence
- Maturino da Firenze (c. 1490 – c. 1528), painter, a close companion of Polidoro da Caravaggio
- Melozzo da Forlì (c. 1438–1494), painter of the Umbrian school. One of the great fresco artists of the 15th century
- Michelangelo (1475–1564), sculptor, painter, architect and poet who exerted an unparalleled influence on the development of Western art. Author of The Creation of Adam (c. 1511)
- Moretto da Brescia (c. 1498–1554), painter. Together with Romanino and Girolamo Savoldo, he was one of the most distinguished painters of Brescia of the 16th century
- Giovanni Battista Moroni (c. 1520/1524–1578), painter. He was known for his sober and dignified portraits
- Palma Giovane (1548/1550–1628), painter. The leading Venetian painter and draftsman of the late 16th and early 17th centuries
- Palma Vecchio (c. 1480–1528), painter of the High Renaissance, noted for the craftsmanship of his religious and mythological works
- Parmigianino (1503–1540), painter, one of the first artists to develop the elegant and sophisticated version of Mannerist style
- Perino del Vaga (1501–1547), painter. A pupil and assistant of Raphael Sanzio in Rome, he carried out decorations in the Logge of the Vatican from Raphael's designs
- Francesco Pesellino (1422–1457), painter of the Florentine school who excelled in the execution of small-scale paintings
- Piero della Francesca (c. 1415–1492), painter and mathematician. His most famous cycle, The History of the True Cross (1452–1466), depicts scenes from the Golden Legend
- Piero di Cosimo (1462–1521), painter noted for his eccentric character and his fanciful mythological paintings
- Pietro Perugino (1446–1524), painter. One of his most famous masterpieces is The Delivery of the Keys (1481–1482), in the Sistine Chapel
- Pinturicchio (1454–1513), painter, known for his highly decorative frescoes. His most elaborate project was the decoration of the Cathedral of Siena
- Pisanello (c. 1395–1455), medalist and painter. He is regarded as the foremost exponent of the International Gothic style in Italian painting
- Polidoro da Caravaggio (c. 1499–1543), painter. One of the most original and innovative artists of the mid-16th century
- Antonio del Pollaiuolo (1429/1433–1498), painter, sculptor, goldsmith, and engraver, was a master of anatomical rendering and excelled in action subjects, notably mythologies
- Pontormo (1494–1557), painter. He is thought to have painted Vertumnus and Pomona (1520–1521), which shows qualities characteristic of mannerism
- Il Pordenone (c. 1484–1539), painter chiefly known for his frescoes of religious subjects
- Francesco Primaticcio (1504–1570), painter, architect, sculptor, and leader of the first school of Fontainebleau
- Francesco Raibolini (c. 1450–1517), painter, goldsmith and medallist. His major surviving paintings are altarpieces, mostly images of the Virgin and saints
- Raphael (1483–1520), painter and architect, expressed the ideals of the High Renaissance, known for his Madonnas
- Giulio Romano (c. 1499–1546), painter and architect. Well-known oils include The Stoning of St. Stephen (Church of Santo Stefano, Genoa) and Adoration of the Magi (Louvre)
- Cosimo Rosselli (1439–1507), painter. Of his many works in Florence the most famous is The Miracle-working Chalice in Sant' Ambrogio, a work that includes many contemporary portraits
- Andrea Schiavone (c. 1510/15–1563), painter and etcher. His most characteristic works were fairly small religious or mythological pictures for private patrons
- Sebastiano del Piombo (c. 1485–1547), painter of the Venetian School, known for his portraits, including his portrayal of Pope Clement VII (1526)
- Luca Signorelli (c. 1445–1523), painter, known for his nudes and for his novel compositional devices. His masterpiece is the fresco cycle in Orvieto Cathedral
- Il Sodoma (1477–1549), painter, a master of the human figure and leading pupil of Leonardo da Vinci
- Francesco Squarcione (c. 1395 – after 1468), painter who founded the Paduan school and is known for being the teacher of Andrea Mantegna and other noteworthy painters
- Taddeo di Bartolo (c. 1362–1422), painter. He was the leading painter in Siena in the first two decades of the 15th century and also worked in and for other cities
- Antonio Tempesta (1555–1630), painter and engraver from Florence who specialised in pastoral scenes
- Pellegrino Tibaldi (1527–1596), painter, sculptor, and architect who spread the style of Italian Mannerist painting in Spain during the late 16th century
- Tintoretto (1518–1594), painter of the Venetian school. One of the most important artists of the late Renaissance. His works include St. George and the Dragon (1555)
- Titian (c. 1488/1490–1576), painter of the Venetian school, noted for his religious and mythological works, such as Bacchus and Ariadne (1520–1523), and his portraits
- Cosimo Tura (c. 1430–1495), painter who was the founder and the first significant figure of the 15th-century school of Ferrara
- Paolo Uccello (1397–1475), painter. His three panels depicting The Battle of San Romano (1438), combine the decorative late Gothic style with the new heroic style of the early Renaissance
- Bartolomeo Veneto (fl. 1502–1546), painter who worked in Northern Italy in an area bounded by Venice and Milan
- Domenico Veneziano (c. 1410–1461), painter. In Florence he created his most celebrated work, the St. Lucy Altarpiece (c. 1445–1447)
- Paolo Veronese (1528–1588), painter of the Venetian school, famous for paintings such as The Wedding at Cana (1563) and The Feast in the House of Levi (1573)
- Alvise Vivarini (1442/1453–1503–1505), painter in the late Gothic style whose father, Antonio, was the founder of the influential Vivarini family of Venetian artists
- Bartolomeo Vivarini (c. 1432 – c. 1499), painter and member of the influential Vivarini family of Venetian artists
- Jacopo Zabolino (active 1461–1494) painter of frescoes of a mainly religious theme
- Federico Zuccari (c. 1540/1541–1609), painter and architect. He was the author of L'idea de' Pittori, Scultori, ed Architetti (1607)
- Taddeo Zuccari (1529–1566), painter. One of the most popular members of the Roman mannerist school

=== Baroque and Rococo ===
- Francesco Albani (1578–1660), painter, known for paintings of mythological and poetic subjects
- Giacomo Alberelli (1600–1650), painter, pupil of Jacopo Palma the Younger
- Cristofano Allori (1577–1621), painter. He became one of the foremost Florentine artists of the early Baroque period, also winning renown as a courtier, poet, musician and lover
- Jacopo Amigoni (1682–1752), painter and etcher. His oeuvre includes decorative frescoes for churches and palaces, history and mythological paintings and a few etchings
- Leonardo dell'Arca (active c. 1600), engraver. His work is held permanently at the Victoria and Albert Museum.
- Marcello Bacciarelli (1731–1818), painter working at the royal court in Warsaw, who captured seminal moments in Polish history on canvas
- Sisto Badalocchio (1585 – c. 1647), painter and engraver. His most important work are the frescoes in the cupola and pendentives of St. John the Baptist (Reggio Emilia)
- Pompeo Batoni (1708–1787), painter
- Bernardo Bellotto (1720–1780), painter of vedute ("view paintings")
- Guido Cagnacci (1601–1663), painter. Particularly noteworthy are his altarpieces of the Virgin and Child with Three Carmelite Saints (c. 1631) and Christ with Saints Joseph and Eligius (1635)
- Canaletto (1697–1768), painter and etcher, noted particularly for his highly detailed paintings of cities, esp Venice, which are marked by strong contrasts of light and shade
- Battistello Caracciolo (1578–1635), painter. Caravaggesque painter and the founder of Neapolitan Caravaggism
- Caravaggio (1571–1610), painter of the baroque whose influential works, such as The Entombment of Christ (1602–1603), are marked by intense realism and revolutionary use of light
- Annibale Carracci (1560–1609), painter. Well known among his numerous works are The Beaneater (1580–1590), The Choice of Hercules (1596) and Domine quo vadis? (c. 1603)
- Ludovico Carracci (1555–1619), painter, draughtsman and etcher born in Bologna
- Rosalba Carriera (1675–1757), portrait painter and miniaturist, Rococo style, known for her work in pastels
- Giuseppe Crespi (1665–1747), painter of the Bolognese school, known for the imposing paintings of the Seven Sacraments (1712)
- Carlo Dolci (1616–1686), Florentine painter, known for his paintings of the heads and half-figures of Jesus and the Mater Dolorosa
- Domenichino (1581–1641), painter of the baroque eclectic school who is noted for his religious and mythological works, including several frescoes of Saint Cecilia
- Domenico Fetti (c. 1589–1623), painter whose best-known works are small representations of biblical parables
- Filippo Gagliardi (1606–1659), painter active mainly in Rome. helped in the renovation of San Martino ai Monti (1647–54). He was a member of the Accademia di San Luca from at least 1638 and became principe in 1656–58. He was also a member of the Congregazione dei Virtuosi del Pantheon.
- Giovanni Battista Gaulli (1639–1709), painter. He was a celebrated artist of the Roman High Baroque. Worship of the Holy Name of Jesus (1674–1679) is his most noted work
- Artemisia Gentileschi (1593–1653), painter. Among her works may be cited Susanna and the Elders (1610) and Judith Slaying Holofernes (1614–1620)
- Orazio Gentileschi (1563–1639), painter. The Annunciation (1623), painted in Genoa and now in the Galleria Sabauda of Turin, is considered by several authorities his masterpiece
- Luca Giordano (1634–1705), painter, the most important Italian decorative artist of the second half of the 17th century
- Francesco Guardi (1712–1793), painter, a follower of Canaletto. His many charming landscapes are in the galleries of London, Paris, Venice and Boston
- Guercino (1591–1666), painter. Extremely skillful, prolific, and quick to finish his work, he was known for his frescoes, altarpieces, oils, and drawings
- Giovanni Lanfranco (1582–1647), painter, one of the foremost artists of the High Baroque. His masterpiece is the Assumption of the Virgin in the dome of Sant'Andrea della Valle (1625–1627)
- Pietro Longhi (1702–1785), painter, known for his small pictures depicting the life of upper-middle-class Venetians of his day
- Alessandro Magnasco (1667–1749), painter, known for his scenes of disembodied, flame-like figures in stormy landscapes or cavernous interiors
- Bartolomeo Manfredi (1582–1622), painter, active mainly in Rome, where he was one of the most important of Caravaggio's followers
- Carlo Maratta (1625–1713), painter and engraver of the Roman school; one of the last great masters of Baroque classicism
- Pietro Novelli (1603–1647), painter. Probably the most distinguished Sicilian painter of the 17th century
- Giovanni Paolo Panini (1691–1765), the foremost painter of Roman topography in the 18th century
- Giovanni Battista Piazzetta (1682–1754), painter, illustrator and designer. His most popular work is the celebrated Fortune Teller (1740)
- Andrea Pozzo (1642–1709), painter, a leading exponent of the baroque style. His masterpiece is the nave ceiling of the Church of Sant'Ignazio in Rome
- Mattia Preti (1613–1699), painter, called Il Calabrese for his birthplace. His most substantial undertaking was the decoration of St. John's, Valletta
- Guido Reni (1575–1642), painter noted for the classical idealism of his renderings of mythological and religious subjects
- Sebastiano Ricci (1659–1734), painter. He is remembered for his decorative paintings, which mark the transition between the late Baroque and the development of the Rococo style
- Salvator Rosa (1615–1673), painter, etcher and poet, known for his spirited battle pieces painted in the style of Falcone, for his marines, and especially for his landscapes
- Francesco Solimena (1657–1747), painter. The leading artist of the Neapolitan Baroque during the first half of the 18th century
- Massimo Stanzione (c. 1586 – c. 1656), painter. His style has a distinctive refinement and grace that has earned him the nickname "the Neapolitan Guido Reni."
- Bernardo Strozzi (c. 1581–1644), painter
- Giovanni Battista Tiepolo (1696–1770), painter. His frescoes in the Palazzo Labia and the doge's palace won him international fame
- Giovanni Domenico Tiepolo (1727–1804), painter and printmaker. His most noted early works are the chinoiserie decorations of the Villa Valmarana in Vicenza (1757)

=== The 1800s ===
- Giuseppe Abbati (1836–1868), painter of the macchiaioli group
- Andrea Appiani (1754–1817), fresco painter active in Milan and a court painter of Napoleon
- Giovanni Boldini (1842–1931), painter, one of the most renowned society portraitists of his day. He worked mainly in Paris, where he settled in 1872
- Fyodor Bruni (1799–1875), painter who worked in the Academic style
- Constantino Brumidi (1805–1880), Italian-American painter, whose best-known works are his frescoes in the Capitol building, Washington, D.C.
- Vincenzo Camuccini (1771–1844), painter. His many drawings reveal a fluid technique and lively artistic imagination
- Antonio Ciseri (1821–1891), painter of religious subjects
- Giuseppe De Nittis (1846–1884), painter, mainly of landscapes and scenes of city life
- Giacomo Di Chirico (1844–1883), Neapolitan painter
- Ciro Denza (1844–1915), Neapolitan painter of landscapes and seascapes.
- Giovanni Fattori (1825–1908), painter; leading figure of the macchiaioli school
- Teresa Fioroni-Voigt (1799–1880), was a miniaturist
- Francesco Hayez (1791–1882), painter, the leading artist of Romanticism in mid-19th-century Milan. His masterpiece is The Kiss (1859)
- Cesare Maccari (1840–1919), painter and sculptor, most famous for his fresco at Palazzo Madama portraying Cicero revealing Catilina's plot (1888)
- Carlo De Notaris (1812–1888) painter, Neoclassic style.
- Romualdo Prati (1874–1930), painter, mostly known for portraits. He also worked in Brazil.
- Enrico Sartori (1831–1889), painter, mainly of genre subjects
- Anatolio Scifoni (1841–1884), painter of genre paintings
- Giovanni Segantini (1858–1899), painter known for his Alpine landscapes and allegorical pictures, which blended Symbolist content with the technique of Neo-Impressionism

=== The 1900s ===
- Pietro Annigoni (1910–1988), painter (and occasional sculptor), the only artist of his time to become internationally famous as a society and state portraitist
- Giacomo Balla (1871–1958), painter, sculptor, stage designer, decorative artist and actor. He was one of the originators of Futurism
- Alziro Bergonzo (1906–1997), architect and painter
- Vincenzo Bianchini (1903–2000), painter, sculptor, writer, poet, doctor and philosopher
- Umberto Boccioni (1882–1916), painter, sculptor and theorist. His painting The City Rises (1910) is a dynamic composition of swirling human figures in a fragmented crowd scene
- Erma Bossi (1875–1952), German Expressionist painter
- Alberto Burri (1915–1995), painter and sculptor. He was one of the first artists to exploit the evocative force of waste materials, looking forward to Trash art in America and Arte Povera in Italy
- Aldo Carpi (1886–1973), rector of the Brera Academy and author of a collection of memoirs concerning his imprisonment in the infamous Mauthausen-Gusen concentration camp.
- Carlo Carrà (1881–1966), painter, known for his still lifes in the style of Metaphysical painting
- Bruno Caruso (1927–2018), painter, illustrator and political activist. He was a celebrated Italian Social Realist and member of the Italian neorealism movement.
- Nicoletta Ceccoli (born 1973), children's book illustrator
- Francesco Clemente (born 1952), painter and draftsman whose dramatic figural imagery was a major component in the revitalization of Italian art beginning in the 1980s
- Enzo Cucchi (born 1949), painter, draughtsman and sculptor. He was a key member of the Italian Transavantgarde movement
- Giorgio de Chirico (1888–1978), painter, founder of the scuola metafisica art movement
- Annalaura di Luggo
- Lazzaro Donati (1926–1977), painter. Born in Florence and attended the Academy of Fine Arts. He began to paint in 1953, and in 1955 held his first exhibition at the Indiano Gallery in Florence.
- Lucio Fontana (1899–1968), painter, sculptor and theorist, founder of Spatialism, noted for gashed monochrome paintings
- Renato Guttuso (1911–1987), painter. He was a forceful personality and Italy's leading exponent of Social realism in the 20th century
- Piero Manzoni (1933–1963), artist. He is regarded as one of the forerunners of Arte Povera and Conceptual art
- Amedeo Modigliani (1884–1920), painter and sculptor whose portraits and nudes, characterized by asymmetrical compositions, are among the most important portraits of the 20th century
- Giorgio Morandi (1890–1964), painter and etcher. He is widely acknowledged as a major Italian painter of the 20th century
- Giuseppe Pellizza da Volpedo (1868–1907), painter. His most famous work is The Fourth Estate (1901); a symbol of the 20th
- Giovanni Pelliccioli (born 1947), surrealist painter. In 1993 he created a new form in the world of the artistic painting – the "triangle"
- Luigi Russolo (1885–1947), painter. One of the five signers of the basic 1910 "Manifesto of Futurist Painting" before switching his attention to music
- Emilio Scanavino (1922–1986), painter and sculptor. One of the most important protagonists of the Spatialist movement in Italy
- Gino Severini (1883–1966), painter who synthesized the styles of Futurism and Cubism
- Mario Sironi (1885–1961), painter, sculptor, illustrator and designer. He was the leading artist of the Novecento Italiano group in the 1920s, developing a muscular, monumental figurative style
- Antonio Diego Voci (1920–1985), painter. Born in Gasperina, Calabria, Italy. Artist of a Thousand Faces. Surrealism Cubism Fauvism Realism Italian
- Sergio Zanni (born 1942), painter and sculptor
- Giulia Andreani (born 1985), painter. She works on archives and develops a history painting.

== Photographers ==
- Severo Antonelli (1907–1995)
- Felice Beato (1834–1909)
- Anton Giulio Bragaglia (1890–1960)
- Paolo Gasparini (born 1934)
- Giuseppe Incorpora (1834–1914)
- Pietro Marubi (1834–1903)
- Tina Modotti (1896–1942)
- Marco Panzetti (born 1981)
- Francesco Romoli (born 1977)
- Franco Rubartelli (born 1937)
- Ferdinando Scianna (born 1943)
- Ermanno Stradelli (1852-1926)
- Oliviero Toscani (born 1942)

== Printers ==
- Panfilo Castaldi (c. 1398 – c. 1490), physician and "master of the art of printing", to whom local tradition attributes the invention of moveable type
- Fortunato Bartolomeo de Felice, 2nd Conte di Panzutti (1723–1789), printer, publisher and scientist. Settled in Yverdon where he published a version of the Encyclopédie (1770–1780). Also known for his escapades across Europe with a married Countessa.
- Francesco Franceschi (c. 1530 – c. 1599), printer. Known for the high quality of his engravings, which were done using metal plates rather than wooden
- Gabriele Giolito de' Ferrari (c. 1508–1578), bookseller, printer and editor at Venice. He was one of the first major publishers of literature in the vernacular Italian language
- Johannes Philippus de Lignamine (c. 1420–?), printer and publisher, known for his publication of Herbarium Apuleii Platonici (1481)
- Aldus Manutius (1449–1515), printer, noted for his fine editions of the classics. Inventor of the italic type (1501) and also the first to use the semicolon
- Aldus Manutius the Younger (1547–1597), printer, last member of the Italian family of Manutius to be active in the famous Aldine Press
- Giovanni Battista Pasquali (1702–1784), printer, a leading printer in 18th-century Venice
- Pietro Perna (1519–1582), printer, the leading printer of late Renaissance Basel
- Ottaviano Petrucci (1466–1539), printer. Inventor of movable metal type for printing mensural and polyphonic music
- Lawrence Torrentinus (1499–1563), typographer and printer for Cosimo I de' Medici, Grand Duke of Tuscany

== Printmakers ==
- Domenico Campagnola (c. 1500–1564), painter and printmaker and one of the first professional draftsmen
- Giulio Campagnola (c. 1482 – c. 1515), painter and engraver who anticipated by over two centuries the development of stipple engraving
- Agostino Carracci (1557–1602), painter and printmaker. He was the brother of the more famous Annibale and cousin of Lodovico Carracci
- Giovanni Francesco Cassioni (17th century), engraver in wood
- Stefano della Bella (1610–1664), printmaker noted for his engravings of military events, in the manner of Jacques Callot
- Marcantonio Raimondi (c. 1480 – c. 1534), engraver, known for being the first important printmaker. He is therefore a key figure in the rise of the reproductive print
- Mario Labacco (active 1551–67), engraver
- Bartolomeo Nerici (c. 1708 – c. 1798), engraver in copper
- Francesco Rosselli (1445–before 1513), miniature painter, and an important engraver of maps and old master prints
- Ugo da Carpi (c. 1480–between 1520 and 1532), painter and printmaker, the first Italian practitioner of the art of the chiaroscuro woodcut

== Saints ==
- Agatha of Sicily (fl. 3rd century AD), legendary Christian saint, martyred under Roman Emperor Decius. She is invoked against outbreaks of fire and is the patron saint of bell makers
- Agnes of Rome (c. 291–c. 304), legendary Christian martyr, the patron saint of girls
- Robert Bellarmine (1542–1621), theologian, cardinal, Doctor of the Church, and a principal influence in the Counter-Reformation
- Bernardine of Siena (1380–1444), preacher. He was a Franciscan of the Observant congregation and one of the most effective and most widely known preachers of his day
- Charles Borromeo (1538–1584), cardinal and archbishop. He was one of the leaders of the Counter-Reformation
- John Bosco (1815–1888), Catholic priest, pioneer in educating the poor and founder of the Salesian Order
- Mother Frances Cabrini (1850–1917), religious migrated in USA. She founded the Missionary Sisters of the Sacred Heart of Jesus, that was a major support to the Italian immigrants to the United States.
- Catherine of Siena (1347–1380), Dominican tertiary, mystic, and patron saint of Italy who played a major role in returning the papacy from Avignon to Rome (1377)
- Camillus de Lellis (1550–1614), priest who founded the Camillians, a religious order dedicated to the care of the sick.
- Saint Cecilia (2nd century AD), patron saint of musicians and Church music. Venerated in both East and West, she is one of the eight women commemorated by name in the Canon of the Mass
- Paula Frassinetti (1809–1892), founder of the Congregation of the Sisters of Saint Dorothy. Her feast day is 11 June
- Francis of Paola (1416–1507), mendicant friar. The founder of the Minims, a religious order in the Catholic Church
- Hippolytus of Rome (170–235), Christian martyr who was also the first antipope (217/218–235)
- Januarius (?–c. 305), Bishop and martyr, sometimes called Gennaro, long popular because of the liquefaction of his blood on his feast day
- Lawrence of Brindisi (1559–1619), Capuchin friar. He was one of the leading polemicists of the Counter-Reformation in Germany
- Saint Longinus (1st century AD), Roman soldier who pierced Jesus's side with a spear as he hung on the cross
- Saint Lucy (283–304), Christian martyr. She is the patroness saint of the city of Syracuse (Sicily)
- Giuseppe Moscati (1880–1927), doctor, scientific researcher, and university professor noted both for his pioneering work in biochemistry and for his piety
- Philip Neri (1515–1595), priest. The founder of the Congregation of the Oratory, a congregation of secular priests and clerics
- Nicholas of Tolentino (1246–1305), known as the Patron of Holy Souls, was an Italian saint and mystic.
- Pio of Pietrelcina (1887–1968), Capuchin priest. He is renowned among Roman Catholics as one of the Church's modern stigmatists
- Rita of Cascia (1381–1457), Augustinian nun
- Saint Rosalia (1130–1166), hermitess, greatly venerated at Palermo and in the whole of Sicily of which she in patroness
- Rose of Viterbo (1233–1251), she spent her brief life as a recluse, who was outspoken in her support of the papacy.
- Roger of Cannae (1060–1129), Bishop
- Saint Valentine (3rd century AD), according to tradition, he is the patron saint of courtship, travelers, and young people
- Saint Vitus (c. 290 – c. 303), Christian saint. He is counted as one of the Fourteen Holy Helpers of the Catholic Church
- Artémides Zatti (1880–1951), Salesian and noted pharmacist that emigrated to Argentina in 1897 where became well known for his ardent faith and commitment to the sick in Patagonia.

== Scientists ==
- Maria Gaetana Agnesi (1718–1799), linguist, mathematician and philosopher, considered to be the first woman in the Western world to have achieved a reputation in mathematics
- Archimedes (288–212 BC), mathematician, physicist, engineer, inventor, and astronomer. Developed Archimedes' principle and invented Archimedes' screw.
- Roberto Assagioli (1888–1974), psychiatrist and psychologist. The founder of the healing system known as psychosynthesis
- Gjuro Baglivi (1668–1707), physician and scientist. He published the first clinical description of pulmonary edema and made classic observations on the histology and physiology of muscle
- Franco Basaglia (1924–1980), psychiatrist. He was the promoter of an important reform in the Italian mental health system, the "legge 180/78" (law number 180, year 1978)
- Agostino Bassi (1773–1856), entomologist. The first person to succeed in the experimental transmission of a contagious disease
- Ulisse Aldrovandi (1522–1605), naturalist, noted for his systematic and accurate observations of animals, plants and minerals
- Giuseppina Aliverti (1894–1982), geophysicist remembered for developing the Aliverti-Lovera method of measuring the radioactivity of water
- Giovanni Battista Amici (1786–1863), astronomer and microscopist. The inventor of the catadioptric microscope (presented at the Arts and Industry Exhibition in Milan in 1812)
- Edoardo Amaldi (1908–1989), physicist, one of the founding fathers of European space research, led the founding of the CERN, the ESRO and later the European Space Agency (ESA)
- Giovanni Arduino (1714–1795), father of Italian geology, who established bases for stratigraphic chronology by classifying the four main layers of the Earth's crust
- Silvano Arieti (1914–1981), psychiatrist and psychoanalyst long recognized as a leading authority on schizophrenia
- Gaspare Aselli (c. 1581–1625), physician who contributed to the knowledge of the circulation of body fluids by discovering the lacteal vessels
- Roberto Assagioli (1888–1974), psychiatrist and psychologist. The founder of the healing system known as psychosynthesis
- Amedeo Avogadro (1776–1856), chemist and physicist. The founder of the molecular theory now known as Avogadro's law.
- Fabio Badilini (born 1964), pioneer in noninvasive electrocardiography.
- Gjuro Baglivi (1668–1707), physician and scientist. He published the first clinical description of pulmonary edema and made classic observations on the histology and physiology of muscle
- Marcella Balconi (1919–1999) child neuropsychiatrist and member of the resistance during World War II. She pioneered the practice of psychoanalytic infant observation in Italy.
- Franco Basaglia (1924–1980), psychiatrist. He was the promoter of an important reform in the Italian mental health system, the "legge 180/78" (law number 180, year 1978)
- Agostino Bassi (1773–1856), entomologist. The first person to succeed in the experimental transmission of a contagious disease
- Laura Bassi (1711–1778), scientist and physics professor at the University of Bologna
- Jacopo Berengario da Carpi (c. 1460 – c. 1530), physician and anatomist who was the first to describe the heart valves
- Giulio Bizzozero (1846–1901), anatomist. He is known as the original discoverer of Helicobacter pylori (1893)
- Enrico Bombieri (born 1940), mathematician who was awarded the Fields Medal in 1974 for his work in number theory
- Claudio Bordignon (born 1950), biologist, performed the first procedure of gene therapy using stem cells as gene vectors (1992)
- Giovanni Alfonso Borelli (1608–1679), physiologist and physicist who was the first to explain muscular movement and other body functions according to the laws of statics and dynamics
- Virginia Angiola Borrino (1880–1965), physician who was the first woman to serve as head of a University Pediatric Ward in Italy
- Giacomo Bresadola (1847–1929), clergyman and a prolific and influential mycologist
- Franco Brezzi (born 1945), mathematician.
- Francesco Brioschi (1824–1897), mathematician, known for his contributions to the theory of algebraic equations and to the applications of mathematics to hydraulics
- Giuseppe Brotzu (1895–1976), physician, famous for having discovered the cephalosporin (1948)
- Tito Livio Burattini (1617–1681), mathematician, in his book Misura Universale, published in 1675, first suggested the name meter as the name for a unit of length
- Nicola Cabibbo (1935–2010), physicist who reconciled these strange-particle decays with the universality of weak interactions
- Federico Caffè (1914; disappeared 15 April 1987; declared dead 30 October 1998) was a notable economist from the Keynesian School.
- Leopoldo Marco Antonio Caldani (1725–1813), anatomist and physiologist. He is noted for his experimental studies on the function of the spinal cord
- Temistocle Calzecchi-Onesti (1853–1922), physicist, invented a tube filled with iron filings, called a "coherer" (1884)
- Tommaso Campailla (1668–1740), physician, philosopher and poet, inventor of "vapour stovens" that he used to fight syphilis rheumatism
- Giuseppe Campani (1635–1715), optician and astronomer who invented a lens-grinding lathe
- Stanislao Cannizzaro (1826–1910), chemist, in 1858 put an end to confusion over values to be attributed to atomic weights, using Avogadro's hypothesis
- Federico Capasso (born 1949), physicist, one of the inventors of the quantum cascade laser (QCL) in 1994
- Mario Capecchi (born 1937), molecular geneticist, famous for having contribution to development of "knockout mice" (1989)
- Gerolamo Cardano (1501–1576), mathematician and physician; initiated the general theory of cubic and quartic equations. He emphasized the need for both negative and complex numbers
- Antonio Cardarelli (1831–1926), physician remembered for describing Cardarelli's sign
- Antonio Carini (1872–1950), physician and bacteriologist who discovered Pneumocystis carinii, which is responsible for recurrent pneumonia in patients with AIDS
- Francesco Carlini (1783–1862), astronomer. Worked in the field of celestial mechanics, improved the theory of the motion of the Moon
- Giovanni Caselli (1815–1891), physicist, inventor of the pantelegraph (1861)
- Giovanni Domenico Cassini (1625–1712), mathematician, astronomer, engineer and astrologer who was the first to observe four of Saturn's moons
- Bonaventura Cavalieri (1598–1647), mathematician. He invented the method of indivisibles (1635) that foreshadowed integral calculus
- Luigi Luca Cavalli-Sforza (1922–2018), population geneticist, currently teaching since 1970 as emeritus professor at Stanford University. One of the most important geneticists of the 20th century
- Andrea Cavalleri (born 1969), physicist who specializes in optical science. Founder of the Max Planck Institute for the Structure and Dynamics of Matter. Professor at the University of Oxford. In 2018 was awarded with the Frank Isakson Prize
- Tiberius Cavallo (1749–1809), physicist and natural philosopher who wrote on the early experiments with electricity. He was known contemporaneously as the inventor of Cavallo's multiplier
- Ugo Cerletti (1877–1963), neurologist, co-inventor with Lucio Bini, of the method of electroconvulsive therapy in psychiatry
- Vincenzo Cerulli (1859–1927), astronomer. The author of the idea that the canali are just a special kind of optical illusion
- Andrea Cesalpino (1519–1603), physician, philosopher and botanist, produced the first scientific classification of plants and animals by genera and species
- Ernesto Cesàro (1859–1906), mathematician. In 1880 he developed methods of finding the sum of divergent series. Cesàro made important contributions to intrinsic geometry
- Giacinto Cestoni (1637–1718), naturalist, studied fleas and algae, and showed that scabies is provoked by Sarcoptes scabiei (1689)
- Vincenzo Chiarugi (1759–1820), physician who introduced humanitarian reforms to the psychiatric hospital care of people with mental disorders
- Agostino Codazzi (1793–1859), soldier, scientist, geographer, cartographer
- Angela Codazzi (1890–1972), geographer, cartographer
- Realdo Colombo (c. 1516–1559), one of the first anatomists in the Western world to describe pulmonary circulation
- Orso Mario Corbino (1876–1937), physicist and politician, discovered modulation calorimetry and Corbino effect, a variant of the Hall effect
- Alfonso Giacomo Gaspare Corti (1822–1876), anatomist, known for his discoveries on the anatomical structure of the ear
- Domenico Cotugno (1736–1822), physician. He discovered albuminuria (about a half century before Richard Bright) and was also one of the first scientists to identify urea in human urine
- Leon Croizat (1894–1982), scholar and botanist who developed an orthogenetic synthesis of evolution of biological form over space, in time, which he called panbiogeography
- Alessandro Cruto (1847–1908), inventor who improved on Thomas Alva Edison incandescent light bulb with carbon filament (1881)
- Lea Del Bo Rossi (1903–1978), medical researcher who found a staining method based on a Coz-silver impregnation technique
- Alessio Fasano, gastroenterologist and researcher at Harvard Medical School. Director of the Center for Celiac Research and Treatment at Mass. General Hospital for Children
- Bruno de Finetti (1906–1985), probabilist, statistician and actuary, noted for the "operational subjective" conception of probability
- Annibale de Gasparis (1819–1892), astronomer, his first asteroid discovery was 10 Hygiea in 1849. Between 1850 and 1865, he discovered eight more asteroids
- Ennio De Giorgi (1928–1996), mathematician. He brilliantly resolved the 19th Hilbert problem. Today, this contribution is known as the De Giorgi-Nash Theorem
- Mondino de Liuzzi (c. 1270–1326), physician and anatomist whose Anathomia corporis humani (MS. 1316; first printed in 1478) was the first modern work on anatomy
- Olinto De Pretto (1857–1921), industrialist and geologist. It is claimed by Italian mathematician, Umberto Bartocci that de Pretto may have been the first person to derive the energy–mass-equivalence E=mc^{2}, generally attributed to Albert Einstein
- Francesco de Vico (1805–1848), astronomer. He discovered a number of comets, including periodic comets 54P/de Vico-Swift-NEAT and 122P/de Vico
- Giambattista della Porta (c. 1535–1615), scholar and polymath, known for his work Magia Naturalis (1558), which dealt with alchemy, magic, and natural philosophy
- Ulisse Dini (1845–1918), mathematician and politician whose most important work was on the theory of functions of real variables
- Eustachio Divini (1610–1685), physician and astronomer; maker of clocks and lenses (1646), innovative compound microscope (1648)
- Giovanni Battista Donati (1826–1873), astronomer. He becomes one of the first to systematically adapt the new science of spectroscopy to astronomy
- Giovanni Dondi dell'Orologio (1330–1388), doctor and clock-maker at Padua, son of Jacopo Dondi, builder of the Astrarium
- Jacopo Dondi dell'Orologio (1293–1359), doctor and clock-maker at Padua, father of Giovanni
- Angelo Dubini (1813–1902), physician who identified Ancylostoma duodenale (1838)
- Girolamo Segato (1792–1836), Egyptologist and anatomist, best known for his unique work in the petrifaction of human cadavers.
- Renato Dulbecco (1914–2012), virologist, known for his brilliant work with two viruses that can transform animal cells into a cancer-like state in the test tube
- Federigo Enriques (1871–1946), mathematician, known principally as the first to give a classification of algebraic surfaces in birational geometry
- Paolo Enriques (1878–1932), zoologist of Padua University.
- Vittorio Erspamer (1909–1999), pharmacologist and chemist, famous for having discovered the serotonin (1935) and octopamine (1948)
- Bartolomeo Eustachi (1500 or 1514–1574), anatomist. He described many structures in the human body, including the Eustachian tube of the ear
- Francesco Faà di Bruno (1825–1888), mathematician, known for the Faà di Bruno formula (1855, 1857)
- Hieronymus Fabricius (1537–1619), anatomist and surgeon, called the founder of modern embryology
- Gabriele Falloppio (1523–1562), anatomist and physician. His important discoveries include the fallopian tubes, leading from uterus to ovaries
- Enrico Fermi (1901–1954), physicist, constructed the world's first nuclear reactor (1942), initiated the Atomic Age
- Lodovico Ferrari (1522–1565), mathematician, famous for having discovered the solution of the general quartic equation
- Galileo Ferraris (1847–1897), physicist and electrical engineer, noted for the discovery of the rotating magnetic field, basic working principle of the induction motor
- Amarro Fiamberti (10 September 1894 – 1970), psychiatrist who first performed a transorbital lobotomy (by accessing the frontal lobe of the brain through the orbits) in 1937
- Leonardo Fibonacci (c. 1170 – c. 1250), mathematician, eponym of the Fibonacci number sequence. He is considered to be the most talented Western mathematician of the Middle Ages.
- Quirico Filopanti (1812–1894), mathematician and politician. In his book Miranda! (1858), he was the first to propose universal time and worldwide standard time zones 21 years before Sandford Fleming
- Giovanni Fontana (1395–1455), physician and engineer
- Carlo Forlanini (1847–1918), physician, inventor of artificial pneumothorax (1882) for treatment of pulmonary tuberculosis
- Carlo Fornasini (1854–1931), micropalaeontologist who studied Foraminifera
- Girolamo Fracastoro (1478–1553), physician and scholar, the first to state the germ theory of infection and is regarded as the founder of scientific epidemiology
- Guido Fubini (1879–1943), mathematician, eponym of Fubini's theorem in measure theory
- Pirro Maria Gabrielli (1643–1705), physician
- Galileo Galilei (1564–1642), physicist and astronomer. The founder of modern science who accurately described heliocentric Solar System
- Luigi Galvani (1737–1798), physician and physicist, noted for his discovery of animal electricity
- Agostino Gemelli (1878–1959), physician, psychologist, and priest, founder of a university and eponym of the Agostino Gemelli University Polyclinic
- Luca Ghini (1490–1556), physician and botanist, best known as the creator of the first recorded herbarium and founder of the world's first botanical garden
- Gabriele Ghisellini (born 1956), astrophysicist
- Riccardo Giacconi (1931–2018), astrophysicist, called the father of X-ray astronomy
- Clelia Giacobini (1931–2010), microbiologist, a pioneer of microbiology applied to conservation-restoration
- Fabiola Gianotti (born 1960), experimental particle physicist, first woman ever Director-General at CERN
- Corrado Gini (1884–1965), statistician, demographer and sociologist, developer of Gini coefficient
- Camillo Golgi (1843–1926), histologist noted for work on the structure of the nervous system and for his discovery of Golgi apparatus (1897)
- Luigi Guido Grandi (1671–1742), philosopher, mathematician and engineer, known for studying the rose curve, a curve which has the shape of a petalled flower, and for Grandi's series
- Giovanni Battista Grassi (1854–1925), zoologist who discovered that mosquitoes were responsible for transmitting malaria between humans
- Francesco Maria Grimaldi (1618–1663), physicist and mathematician, noted for his discoveries in the field of optics, he was the first to describe the diffraction of light
- Nicola Guarino (born 1954), scientist, co-inventor with Chris Welty, of the OntoClean, the first methodology for formal ontological analysis
- Guido da Vigevano (c. 1280 – c. 1349), physician and inventor who became one of the first writers to include illustrations in a work on anatomy
- Giovanni Battista Hodierna (1597–1660), astronomer. He was one of the first to create a catalog of celestial objects with a telescope
- Arturo Issel (1842–1922), geologist, palaeontologist, malacologist and archaeologist. He is noted for first defining the Tyrrhenian Stage (1914)
- Joseph-Louis Lagrange (1736–1813), Italian-French who made major contributions to mathematics, astronomics and physics
- Giovanni Maria Lancisi (1654–1720), clinician and anatomist who is considered the first modern hygienist
- Pio Lava Boccardo (1902–1971), zootechnician and wildlife breeder migrated in Venezuela
- Rita Levi-Montalcini (1909–2012), neurologist, famous for having discovered the nerve growth factor (NGF)
- Aloysius Lilius (c. 1510–1576), astronomer and physician. The principal author of the Gregorian Calendar (1582)
- Cesare Lombroso (1835–1909), criminologist, phrenologist, physician, and founder of the Italian School of Positivist Criminology
- Salvador Luria (1912–1991), microbiologist. He shared a 1969 Nobel Prize for investigating the mechanism of viral infection in living cells
- Giovanni Antonio Magini (1555–1617), astronomer, astrologer, cartographer and mathematician, known for his reduced size edition of Ptolemy's Geographiae (1596)
- Ettore Majorana (1906–1938), theoretical physicist. He is noted for the eponymous Majorana equation
- Marcello Malpighi (1628–1694), physician and biologist. He is regarded as the founder of microscopic anatomy and may be regarded as the first histologist
- Massimo Marchiori (?–?), computer scientist who made major contributions to the development of the World Wide Web. He was also the creator of HyperSearch
- Guglielmo Marconi (1874–1937), physicist, credited as the inventor of radio, often called the father of wireless communication and technology (1896)
- Filippo Mazzei (1730–1816), physician, philosopher, diplomat, and author, ardent supporter of the American Revolution, and correspondent of Thomas Jefferson. In 1774 he published a pamphlet containing the phrase "All men are by nature equally free and independent". According to John Fitzgerald Kennedy, Mazzei's phrase may have inspired Jefferson in drafting the Declaration of Independence.
- Fulvio Melia (born 1956), writer and astrophysicist; author of Electrodynamics (2001), The Edge of Infinity. Supermassive Black Holes in the Universe (2003), and High-Energy Astrophysics (2009)
- Macedonio Melloni (1798–1854), physicist, demonstrated that radiant heat has similar physical properties to those of light
- Giuseppe Mercalli (1850–1914), volcanologist and seismologist, inventor of the Mercalli intensity scale (1902)
- Franco Modigliani (1918–2003), economist and educator who received the Nobel Prize for Economics in 1985 for his work on household savings and the dynamics of financial markets
- Geminiano Montanari (1633–1687), astronomer. Today, it is better known for his discovery of the variability of the star Algol (c. 1667)
- Maria Montessori (1870–1952), physician and educator. The innovative educational method that bears her name (1907) is now spread in 22,000 schools in at least 110 countries worldwide
- Giovanni Battista Morgagni (1682–1771), anatomist, called the founder of pathologic anatomy
- Angelo Mosso (1846–1910), physiologist who created the first crude neuroimaging technique
- Giulio Natta (1903–1979), chemist, famous for having discovered isotactic polypropylene (1954) and polymers (1957). He won a Nobel Prize in 1963 with Karl Ziegler for work on catalisys of high polymers.
- Adelchi Negri (1876–1912), pathologist and microbiologist who identified what later became known as Negri bodies (1903) in the brains of animals and humans infected with the rabies virus
- Leopoldo Nobili (1784–1835), physicist, designed the first precision instrument for measuring electric current (1825)
- Giuseppe Occhialini (1907–1993), physicist, contributed to the discovery of the pion or pi-meson decay in 1947, with César Lattes and Cecil Frank Powell
- Barnaba Oriani (1752–1832), astronomer. Great scholar of orbital theories
- Filippo Pacini (1812–1883), anatomist who isolated the Vibrio cholerae (1854); the bacteria that causes cholera
- Antonio Pacinotti (1841–1912), physicist, inventor of the dynamo (1858) and electric motor (1858)
- Luca Pacioli (1446/7–1517), mathematician and founder of accounting. He popularized the system of double bookkeeping for keeping financial records and is often known as the father of modern accounting
- Ferdinando Palasciano (1815–1891), physician and politician, considered one of the forerunners of the foundation of the Red Cross
- Luigi Palmieri (1807–1896), physicist and meteorologist, inventor of the mercury seismometer
- Pier Paolo Pandolfi (born 1963), geneticist, discovered the genes underlying acute promyelocytic leukaemia (APL)
- Enzo Paoletti (1943–2018), virologist who developed the technology to express foreign antigens in vaccinia and other poxviruses.
- Vilfredo Pareto (1848–1923), engineer, sociologist, economist, and philosopher, eponym of Pareto distribution, Pareto efficiency, Pareto index and Pareto principle
- Giorgio Parisi (born 1948), theoretical physicist, called the father of the modern field of chaos theory
- Emanuele Paternò (1847–1935), chemist, discoverer of the Paternò–Büchi reaction (1909)
- Giuseppe Peano (1858–1932), mathematician and a founder of symbolic logic whose interests centred on the foundations of mathematics and on the development of a formal logical language
- Gaetano Perusini (1879–1915), physician, remembered for his contribution to the description of Alzheimer's
- Giuseppe Piazzi (1746–1826), mathematician and astronomer who discovered (1 January 1801) and named the first asteroid, or "minor planet", Ceres
- Raffaele Piria (1814–1865), chemist. The first to successfully synthesize salicylic acid (1839); the active ingredient in aspirin
- Giovanni Antonio Amedeo Plana (1781–1864), astronomer and mathematician. The founder of the Observatory of Turin
- Giulio Racah (1909–1965), Italian-Israeli mathematician and physicist; Acting President of the Hebrew University of Jerusalem
- Antonio Raimondi (1826–1890), geographer and scientist
- Franco Rasetti (1901–2001), physicist, paleontologist and botanist. Together with Enrico Fermi, he discovered key processes leading to nuclear fission but refused to work on the Manhattan Project on moral grounds
- Bernardino Ramazzini (1633–1714), physician, considered a founder of occupational medicine
- Francesco Redi (1626–1697), physician who demonstrated that the presence of maggots in putrefying meat does not result from spontaneous generation but from eggs laid on the meat by flies
- Jacopo Riccati (1676–1754), mathematician, known in connection with his problem, called Riccati's equation, published in the Acla eruditorum (1724)
- Matteo Ricci (1552–1610), missionary to China, mathematician, linguist and published the first Chinese edition of Euclid's Elements
- Gregorio Ricci-Curbastro (1853–1925), mathematician, inventor of tensor analysis collaborator with Tullio Levi-Civita
- Giovanni Battista Riccioli (1598–1671), astronomer, devised the system for the nomenclature of lunar features that is now the international standard
- Augusto Righi (1850–1920), physicist who played an important role in the development of electromagnetism
- Scipione Riva-Rocci (1863–1937), internist and pediatrician. The inventor of the first mercury sphygmomanometer
- Rogerius (before 1140–c. 1195), surgeon who wrote a work on medicine entitled Practica Chirurgiae ("The Practice of Surgery") around 1180
- Gian Domenico Romagnosi (1761–1835), philosopher, economist and jurist, famous for having discovered the same link between electricity and magnetism
- Bruno Rossi (1905–1993), experimental physicist. An authority on cosmic rays
- Carlo Rubbia (born 1934), physicist who in 1984 shared with Simon van der Meer the Nobel Prize for Physics for the discovery of the massive, short-lived subatomic W particle and Z particle
- Paolo Ruffini (1765–1822), mathematician and physician who made studies of equations that anticipated the algebraic theory of groups
- Nazareno Strampelli (1866–1942), geneticist and agronomist, whose innovative scientific work in wheat breeding 30 years earlier than Borlaug laid the foundations for the Green Revolution
- Giovanni Girolamo Saccheri (1667–1733), philosopher and mathematician who did early work on non-Euclidean geometry, although he didn't see it as such
- Sanctorius (1561–1636), physiologist and physician. He laid the foundation for the study of metabolism
- Henry Salvatori (1901–1997), geophysicist founder of Western Geophysical an international oil exploration company for the purpose of using reflection seismology to explore petroleum.
- Antonio Scarpa (1752–1832), anatomist, famous for the anatomical eponyms Scarpa triangle and Scarpa ganglion of the ear
- Giovanni Schiaparelli (1835–1910), astronomer and science historian who first observed lines on the surface of Mars, which he described as canals
- Angelo Secchi (1818–1878), astronomer. He is known especially for his work in spectroscopy and was a pioneer in classifying stars by their spectra
- Emilio Segrè (1905–1989), physicist, known for his discovery of the antiproton
- Francesco Selmi (1817–1881), chemist. One of the founders of colloid chemistry
- Enrico Sertoli (1842–1910), physiologist and histologist. The discoverer of the cells of the seminiferous tubules of the testis that bear his name (1865)
- Ascanio Sobrero (1812–1888), chemist, famous for having discovered the synthesis of nitroglycerine (1846)
- Lazzaro Spallanzani (1729–1799), biologist and physiologist, called the father of artificial insemination (done at Pavia in 1784)
- Francesco Stelluti (1577–1652), polymath who worked in the fields of mathematics, microscopy, literature and astronomy; in 1625 he published the first accounts of microscopic observation
- Gasparo Tagliacozzi (1546–1599), plastic surgeon. He is considered a pioneer in the field; called the father of plastic surgery
- Niccolò Tartaglia (1499–1557), mathematician who originated the science of ballistics
- Fabiola Terzi (born 1961), physician-scientist, known for her research on chronic kidney disease
- Vincenzo Tiberio (1869–1915), physician and researcher. He was one of many scientists to notice the antibacterial power of some types of mold before Alexander Fleming's discovery of penicillin
- Laura Bassi (1711–1778), scientist who was the first woman to become a physics professor at a European university
- Giuseppe Toaldo (1719–1797), physicist, gave special attention to the study of atmospheric electricity and to the means of protecting buildings against lightning
- Evangelista Torricelli (1608–1647), physicist and mathematician, inventor of the barometer (1643)
- Trotula (11th–12th centuries), physician who wrote several influential works on women's medicine; whose texts on gynecology and obstetrics were widely used for several hundred years in Europe
- Pellegrino Turri (1765–1828), built the first typewriter proven to have worked in 1808. He also invented carbon paper (1806)
- Carlo Urbani (1956–2003), physician. The first person to discover severe acute respiratory syndrome (SARS) in 1998
- Antonio Vallisneri (1661–1730), physician and naturalist who made numerous experiments in entomology and human organology, and combated the doctrine of spontaneous generation
- Antonio Maria Valsalva (1666–1723), professor of anatomy at Bologna. He described several anatomical features of the ear in his book, De aure humana tractatus (1704)
- Costanzo Varolio (1543–1575), remembered for his studies on the anatomy of the brain, and his description of the pons that bears his name
- Gabriele Veneziano (born 1942), theoretical physicist and a founder of string theory
- Giovanni Battista Venturi (1746–1822), physicist. He was the discoverer and eponym of Venturi effect
- Emilio Veratti (1872–1967), anatomist who described the sarcoplasmic reticulum
- Alessandro Volta (1745–1827), electricity pioneer, eponym of the volt, inventor of the electric battery (1800)
- Vito Volterra (1860–1940), mathematician and physicist who strongly influenced the modern development of calculus
- Giuseppe Zamboni (1776–1846), physicist who invented the Zamboni pile (1812); a model of dry battery
- Francesco Zantedeschi (1797–1873), physicist who published papers (1829, 1830) on the production of electric currents in closed circuits by the approach and withdrawal of a magnet
- Antonino Zichichi (born 1929), nuclear physicist
- Niccolò Zucchi (1586–1670), astronomer and physicist. May have been the first to observe belts on the planet Jupiter with a telescope (on 17 May 1630), also claimed to have explored the idea of a reflecting telescope in 1616, predating Galileo Galilei and Giovanni Francesco Sagredo's discussions of the same idea a few years later.
- Giovanni Battista Zupi (c. 1590–1650), astronomer and mathematician. The first person to discover that the planet Mercury had orbital phases

== Sculptors ==
- Agostino di Duccio (1418 – c. 1481), sculptor whose work is characterized by its linear decorativeness
- Giovanni Antonio Amadeo (c. 1447–1522), sculptor, architect and engineer; he took part in the sculpture of the great octagonal dome of Milan Cathedral
- Bartolomeo Ammanati (1511–1592), sculptor and architect; his works, the two members of the del Monte family and the Fountains of Juno and Neptune, are generally considered his masterpieces
- Benedetto Antelami (c. 1150 – c. 1230), sculptor and architect. He is credited with the sculptural decorations of Fidenza Cathedral and Ferrara Cathedral
- Andrea di Alessandro 16th century, sculptor; responsible for the bronze candelabra in the Santa Maria della Salute church.
- Arnolfo di Cambio (c. 1240 – 1300–1310), sculptor and architect; his sculptures have a strong sense of volume that shows the influence on him of antique Roman models
- Giannino Castiglioni (1884–1971), sculptor who worked mostly in monumental and funerary sculpture (father of Achille, Livio, and Pier Giacomo Castiglioni)
- Bartolommeo Bandinelli (1493–1560), sculptor and painter; his most famous and conspicuous sculpture is Hercules and Cacus (1527–34), a pendant to Michelangelo's David
- Renato Barisani (1918–2011), sculptor and painter
- Lorenzo Bartolini (1777–1850), sculptor; his most imposing creation is the Nicola Demidoff monument in Florence
- Benedetto da Maiano (1442–1497), sculptor and architect; whose work is characterized by its decorative elegance and realistic detail
- Gian Lorenzo Bernini (1598–1680), sculptor and architect during the Baroque period; works include Apollo and Daphne (1622–25) and Ecstasy of Saint Theresa (1647–1652)
- Umberto Boccioni (1882–1916), painter and sculptor. The leading theorist of futurist art; his sculpture, Unique Forms of Continuity in Space (1913) is generally considered his masterpiece
- Antonio Canova (1757–1822), sculptor. Leading exponent of the neoclassical school; works include Psyche Revived by Cupid's Kiss (1787–93, 1800–03)
- Benvenuto Cellini (1500–1571), goldsmith, medallist, sculptor and writer. He was one of the foremost Italian Mannerist artists of the 16th century
- Hugo Daini (1919–1976), sculptor mainly active in Venezuela in the second half of the twentieth century.
- Vincenzo Danti (1530–1576), sculptor, architect, and writer, born in Perugia and active mainly in Florence
- Andrea della Robbia (1435–1525), sculptor; known for Crucifixion and the Assumption of the Virgin at La Verna
- Desiderio da Settignano (c. 1430–1464), sculptor; his delicate, sensitive, original technique was best expressed in portrait busts of women and children
- Donatello (c. 1386–1466), sculptor, pioneer of the Renaissance style of natural, lifelike figures, such as the bronze statue David (c. 1440)
- Giovanni Battista Foggini (1652–1725), sculptor and architect; the foremost Florentine sculptor of the late Baroque period
- Domenico Gagini (1420–1492), sculptor. Although he worked at times in Florence and Rome, he is known for his activity in northern Italy
- Silvio Gazzaniga (1921–2016), sculptor. His major works includes FIFA World Cup Trophy, UEFA Europa League trophy and UEFA Supercup trophy
- Vincenzo Gemito (1852–1929), Italian sculptor, draughtsmen
- Lorenzo Ghiberti (1378–1455), sculptor, goldsmith and designer active in Florence
- Giambologna (1529–1608), sculptor in the mannerist style; works include Fountain of Neptune (1563–67) and The Rape of the Sabine Women (1574–80)
- Jacopo della Quercia (c. 1374–1438), sculptor; he is especially noted for his imposing allegorical figures for the Gaia Fountain in Siena
- Cesare Lapini (1848 – after 1890), sculptor; noted for both small marbles and larger work
- Francesco Laurana (c. 1430–1502), sculptor; known for his portrait busts of women, characterized by serene, detached dignity and aristocratic elegance
- Leone Leoni (1509–1590), sculptor and medalist; his most important works were kneeling bronze figures of Charles V and Philip II, with their families, for the sanctuary in the Escorial
- Tullio Lombardo (1460–1532), sculptor; he is noted for the mausoleum of Doge Pietro Mocenigo in Santi Giovanni e Paolo and for other tombs, including that of Dante at Ravenna
- Stefano Maderno (c. 1576–1636), sculptor. He was one of the leading sculptors in Rome during the papacy of Paul V (1605–1621)
- Giacomo Manzù (1908–1991), sculptor; known for his relief sculptures, which give contemporary dimensions to Christian themes
- Marino Marini (1901–1980), sculptor; known for his many vigorous sculptures of horses and horsemen (e.g., Horse and Rider, 1952–53)
- Arturo Martini (1889–1947), sculptor who was active between the World Wars. He is known for figurative sculptures executed in a wide variety of styles and materials
- Livio Masciarelli (1913–1984), sculptor
- Luigi Melchiorre (1859-After 1908), sculptor
- Michelangelo (1475–1564), sculptor and painter; one of the most famous artists in history; creations include Pietà (1499) and David (1504)
- Mino da Fiesole (c. 1429–1484), sculptor; he is noted for his portrait busts
- Giovanni Angelo Montorsoli (c. 1506–1563), sculptor of the Michelangelesque school, and seems to have acted as assistant to Michelangelo
- Nanni di Banco (c. 1384–1421), sculptor; the classically influenced Four Crowned Martyrs (c. 1415) is considered his masterpiece
- Niccolò dell'Arca (c. 1435/1440–1494), sculptor. The Ragusa, Bari, and Apulia variants of his name suggest that he might have come from southern Italy
- Constantino Pandiani (1837–1922), marble and bronze sculptor
- Modesto Parlatore (1849–1912), sculptor
- Luigi Pasquarelli (1832–1889), marble sculptor
- Salesio Pegrassi (1812–1879), sculptor of funereal monuments, statuettes and decorative work
- Salvatore Pisani (1859–1920), sculptor of stucco, bronze and terracotta
- Andrea Pisano (1290–1348), sculptor; his most important work, the first bronze doors of the Baptistery in Florence, was begun in 1330
- Giovanni Pisano (c. 1250 – c. 1315), sculptor, painter and architect; his most famous work is the Pulpit of St. Andrew (1301)
- Nicola Pisano (1220/1225–1284), sometimes considered to be the founder of modern sculpture
- Arnaldo Pomodoro (1926–2025), sculptor; one of the most famous contemporary artists
- Egidio Pozzi (19th to 20th Century), sculptor of portraits, monuments, statues
- Guglielmo Pugi (1850–1915), sculptor based in Florence who was represented at international world's fairs
- Luca della Robbia (1399/1400–1482), sculptor, the most famous member of a family of artists. Two of his famous works are The Nativity (c. 1460) and Madonna and Child (c. 1475)
- Bernardo Rossellino (1409–1464), sculptor and architect. He was among the most distinguished Florentine marble sculptors in the second half of the 15th century
- Giuseppe Sanmartino (1720–1793), sculptor; his masterpiece in this genre is the four Virtues of Charles of Bourbon (1763–64)
- Andrea Sansovino (c. 1467–1529), sculptor; his statues and reliefs for church decoration, such as the Virgin and Child with St. Anne (1512) at San Agostino, were greatly admired
- Laura de Santillana (1955–2019), contemporary glass artist
- Adamo Tadolini (1788–1863), sculptor of the Neoclassic style
- Pietro Tenerani (1789–1869), sculptor of the Neoclassic style
- Secondo Tizzoni (1916–2001), sculptor
- Pietro Torrigiano (1472–1528), sculptor; his gilt bronze masterpiece, the tomb of King Henry VII and his queen, is preserved in Westminster Abbey
- Serafino Tramezzini (1859 - 1893), sculptor
- Vecchietta (1410–1480), painter, sculptor, goldsmith, architect and military engineer. One of the most influential artists of the early Renaissance
- Alessandro Vittoria (1525–1608), sculptor. He was celebrated for his portrait busts and decorative work, much of which was created for the restoration of the Doge's Palace
- Vittorio Santoro (born 1962), Italian/Swiss artist working in sculptures, installations, audio works, works on paper, real-time activities and artist books.
- Jafet Torelli (d. 1898) sculptor and ceramicist.
- Luigi Tosti (1845–), sculptor

== Sportspeople ==
- Giacomo Agostini (born 1942), motorcycle racer
- Fabian Aichner (born 1990), professional wrestler
- Mario Andretti (born 1940), four-time IndyCar and F1 world champion; one of only two drivers to win races in F1, IndyCar, World Sportscar Championship and NASCAR; His record includes 109 career wins on major circuits.
- Alberto Ascari (1918–1955), automobile racing driver; world champion driver in 1952 and 1953
- Charles Atlas (1892–1972), bodybuilder best remembered as the developer of a bodybuilding method
- Walter Avarelli (1912–1987), bridge player, a member of the famous Blue Team, with whom he won nine Bermuda Bowls and three World Team Olympiads from 1956 to 1972.
- Roberto Baggio (born 1967), footballer, Italy's all time FIFA World Cup top scorer, former winner of Ballon d’Or and FIFA World Player of the Year (1993)
- Stefano Baldini (born 1971), retired runner
- Jacques Balmat (1762–1834), mountaineer, called Le Mont Blanc, often regarded as the "Father of Alpinism"; Together with Michel-Gabriel Paccard, he completed the first ever ascent of Mont Blanc (1786)
- Marco Belinelli (born 1986), NBA player for the San Antonio Spurs
- Mario Balotelli (born 1990), footballer; 2010 European Golden Boy and Euro 2012 co-leading scorer
- Franco Baresi (1960–2026), former footballer
- Andrea Bargnani (born 1985), basketball player with the New York Knicks of the National Basketball Association
- Gino Bartali (1914–2000), cyclist, won the Giro d'Italia twice (in 1936 and 1937) and the Tour de France in 1938
- Stefania Belmondo (born 1969), 10-time Olympic medalist in cross-country skiing
- Nino Benvenuti (1938–2025), former boxer
- Giuseppe Bergomi (born 1963), former professional footballer
- Anton Bernard (born 1989), professional ice hockey
- Lorenzo Bernardi (born 1968), volleyball player; Elected by the FIVB "Volleyball Player of the Century" in 2001
- Matteo Berrettini (born 1996), tennis player
- Livio Berruti (born 1939), sprinter, was the 1960 Rome Olympic 200-meter champion
- Paolo Bettini (born 1974), road racing cyclist
- Nino Bibbia (1922–2013), one of skeleton's great, Italy's first Winter Olympic gold medalist. In his illustrious career, he earned 231 golds, 97 silvers, and 84 bronzes; The World's most prestigious race is named after him
- Pierluigi Bini, rock climber
- Leonardo Bonucci (born 1987), footballer.
- Scipione Borghese (1871–1927), aristocrat, industrialist, politician, explorer, mountain climber and racing driver winner of the Peking to Paris race in 1907
- Gianluigi Buffon (born 1978), footballer; goalkeeper.
- Salvatore Burruni (1933–2004), flyweight and bantamweight boxer
- Tony Cairoli (born 1985), eight-time Grand Prix motocross world champion; record of 144 races wins and 72 Grand Prix wins make him the second most successful in motocross history
- Giuseppe Campari (1892–1933), Grand Prix motor racing driver
- Roberto Cammarelle (born 1980), former boxer
- Fabio Cannavaro (born 1973), footballer; centre back; won the FIFA World Player of the Year award in 2006.
- Primo Carnera (1906–1967), heavyweight boxing champion of the world
- Andrea Cassarà (born 1984), Olympic fencer
- Jury Chechi (born 1969), gymnast, nicknamed "The Lord of the Rings"; first athlete in the sport to win five consecutive world championships gold medals in the same event
- Luigi Chinetti (1901–1994), racecar driver who drove in 12 consecutive 24 Hours of Le Mans races, taking three outright wins there . He emigrated to the United States during World War II.
- Pierluigi Collina (born 1960), football referee
- Deborah Compagnoni (born 1970), alpine skier, won three gold medals at the 1992, 1994 and 1998 Winter Olympics
- Adolfo Consolini (1917–1969), discus thrower. He win the gold medal in London 1948 he set an Olympic record at 52.78 m.
- Fausto Coppi (1919–1960), cyclist; successes earned him the title Il Campionissimo, or champion of champions
- Umberto De Morpurgo (1896–1961), tennis player, highest world ranking No. 8, Olympic bronze (singles)
- Alessandro Del Piero (born 1974), footballer.
- Frankie Dettori (born 1970), jockey.
- Klaus Dibiasi (born 1947), diver, the only Olympic diver to have won three successive gold medals and the only one to win medals at four Summer Olympics.
- Alessio Di Chirico (born 1989), mixed martial arts fighter
- Daniela Esposito, bowler
- Giuseppe Farina (1906–1966), racing driver; first Formula One World Champion
- Enzo Ferrari (1898–1988), race car driver and entrepreneur, founder of the Scuderia Ferrari Grand Prix motor racing team
- Domenico Fioravanti (born 1977), retired swimmer
- Roland Fischnaller (born 1980), snowboarder
- Giancarlo Fisichella (born 1973), former Formula One driver
- Fabio Fognini (born 1987), professional tennis player
- Danilo Gallinari (born 1988), No.6 pick in the 2008 NBA draft, NBA player for Oklahoma City Thunder
- Maurice Garin (1871–1957), first giant of Italian cycling, known for winning the inaugural Tour de France in 1903
- Andrea Giani (born 1970), coach and retired volleyball player
- Camila Giorgi (born 1991), tennis player
- Antonio Giovinazzi (born 1993), racing driver currently competing for Alfa Romeo Racing in Formula One
- Paul Hildgartner (born 1952), luger
- Josefa Idem (born 1964), one of sprint canoeing's legends, winner of 38 international medals among Olympic Games, World and European Championships; Her eight Olympic appearances is a female record
- Christof Innerhofer (born 1984), alpine skier, won the men's Super-G at the world Alpine championships in Garmisch-Partenkirchen, Germany
- Vitantonio Liuzzi (born 1980), former Formula One driver
- Duilio Loi (1929–2008), boxer
- Paolo Maldini (born 1968), footballer; centre back.
- Edoardo Mangiarotti (1919–2012), won more Olympic titles and World championships than any other fencer in history
- Antonio Maspes (1932–2000), sprinter cyclist
- Sandro Mazzola (1942–2026), footballer
- Giuseppe Meazza (1910–1979), footballer
- Dino Meneghin (born 1950), basketball player
- Pietro Mennea (1952–2013), sprinter and politician; was the 1980 Moscow Olympic 200-meter champion, and also held the 200 m world record for 17 years
- Reinhold Messner (born 1944), mountaineer and explorer
- Stefano Modena (born 1963), racing driver from Italy, FIA European Formula Three Cup champion in 1986 and International Formula 3000 champion in 1987; participated in 81 Formula One Grands Prix during the years 1987–1992
- Francesco Molinari (born 1982), professional golfer
- Eugenio Monti (1928–2003), bobsledder, most successful athlete in the history of bobsledding with 9 World Championship gold medals and 6 Olympic medals, and the first ever to receive the International Fair Play Committee's Pierre de Coubertin World Trophy
- Uberto De Morpurgo (1896–1961), Austrian-born Italian tennis player
- Paola Mosca Barberis (born 1977), Italian alpine skier
- Francesco Moser (born 1951), road bicycle racer
- Sandro Munari (born in 1940), race car driver strongly associated with rally icon Lancia Stratos HF won a further Monte Carlo Rally hat-trick in the 1970s, among a total of seven World Rally Championship victories.
- Carlton Myers (born 1971), basketball player
- Nedo Nadi (1894–1940), fencer; only one to win a gold medal in each of the three weapons at a single Olympic Games
- Alfonso Nano (born 1987), former professional footballer
- Gastone Nencini (1930–1980), road racing cyclist who won the 1960 Tour de France and the 1957 Giro d'Italia
- Alessandro Nesta (born 1976), footballer; defender
- Vincenzo Nibali (born 1984), professional road bicycle racer
- Tazio Nuvolari (1892–1953), motorcycle and racecar driver
- Patrizio Oliva (born 1959), former boxer
- Abdon Pamich (born 1934), race walker
- Marco Pantani (1970–2004), cyclist, won both the Tour de France, cycling's premier road race, and the Giro d'Italia in 1998
- Dominik Paris (born 1989), alpine skier
- Sergio Parisse (born 1983), rugby union player
- Riccardo Patrese (born 1954), former Formula One driver
- Umberto Pelizzari (born 1965), free diver
- Felix Peselj (born 1990), World Cup Nordic combined skier
- Giorgio Petrosyan (born 1985), kickboxer
- Silvio Piola (1913–1996), footballer who played as a striker
- Andrea Pirlo (born 1979), footballer
- Gianmarco Pozzecco (born 1972), basketball player, an all-around offensive talent; won, for seven years, the ranking for the top assist men in the Italian League
- Gaetano Poziello (born 1975), footballer
- Gigi Riva (born 1944), footballer considered to be one of the best players of his generation, as well as one of the greatest strikers of all time
- Gianni Rivera (born 1943), former footballer
- Costantino Rocca (born 1956), most successful male golfer that Italy has produced
- Antonio Rossi (born 1968), sprint canoer who has competed since the early 1990s
- Paolo Rossi (1956–2020), footballer; is listed among Pelé's 125 all-time greatest footballers
- Valentino Rossi (born 1979), motorcycle racer; one of the most successful motorcycle racers of all time
- Clemente Russo (born 1982), boxer
- Sergio Sabatino (born 1988), professional footballer
- Alessio Sakara (born 1981), mixed martial arts fighter
- Bruno Sammartino, wrestler
- Alex Schwazer (born 1984), race walker
- Martina Scuratti (born 2002), footballer
- Sara Simeoni (born 1953), high jumper; won a gold medal at the 1980 Summer Olympics and twice set a world record in the women's high jump
- Jannik Sinner (born 2001), tennis player
- Giovanni Siorpaes (1869–1909), mountaineer
- Santo Siorpaes (1832–1900), mountaineer
- Virginia Tacci (born 1566 or 1567), jockey in Siena
- Limbergo Taccola (1928–2003), footballer
- Francesco Tagliani (1914–?), footballer
- Marco Tardelli (born 1954), former football player and manager
- Federico Tesio (1869–1954), breeder of Thoroughbreds for horse racing. He has been called "the only genius ever to operate in the breeding world"
- Gustavo Thoeni (born 1951), skier; His record of four overall World Cup titles in five years are exceeded only by Marc Girardelli's five
- Alberto Tomba (born 1966), alpine skier, known as Tomba la Bomba; Earned 3 Olympic gold medals and 9 World Cup trophies winning 50 events
- Francesco Totti (born 1976), footballer
- Alex Treves (1929–2020), Italian-born American Olympic fencer
- Jarno Trulli (born 1974), former Formula One driver
- Ondina Valla (1916–2006), athlete; first Italian woman to win an Olympic gold medal
- Achille Varzi (1904–1948), Grand Prix driver
- Marvin Vettori (born 1993), mixed martial arts fighter
- Valentina Vezzali (born 1974), female fencer; One of only four athletes in the history of the Summer Olympic Games to have won five medals in the same individual event
- Christian Vieri (born 1973), footballer; one of the finest strikers in Europe
- Dorothea Wierer (born 1990), professional biathlete
- Alex Zanardi (born 1966), racing driver; won two CART championship titles in North America during the late 1990s
- Dino Zoff (born 1942), football goalkeeper
- Armin Zöggeler (born 1974), luger; nicknamed Il Cannibale; first Olympian ever, summer or winter, to win six consecutive medals in the same individual event; also holds a record of 10 World Cup titles and 57 victories
- Gianfranco Zola (born 1966), footballer; voted Chelsea's best player in the centenary celebrations of 2005

== Writers and philosophers ==
=== Ancient and Late Antique ===
- Lucius Accius (170 BC–c. 86 BC), Roman poet. Author of more than 40 tragedies with subjects taken from Greek mythology
- Livius Andronicus (c. 284 BC–c. 204 BC), founder of Roman epic poetry and drama
- Arator (480/490–?), Christian poet, his best known work, De Actibus Apostolorum, is a verse history of the Apostles
- Boethius (470/475–524), Roman scholar, Christian philosopher, and statesman, author of the celebrated De consolatione philosophiae
- Cassiodorus (490 – c. 585), historian, statesman, and monk who helped to save the culture of Rome at a time of impending barbarism
- Catullus (c. 84 BC–c. 54 BC), Roman poet whose expressions of love and hatred are generally considered the finest lyric poetry of ancient Rome
- Ennius (239 BC–169 BC), epic poet, dramatist, and satirist, the most influential of the early Latin poets, rightly called the founder of Roman literature
- Julius Firmicus Maternus (?–?), Christian Latin writer and astrologer
- Gaius Valerius Flaccus (?–c. 90), Roman poet. He wrote an eight-book epic, the Argonautica, on Jason's fabled quest for the Golden Fleece
- Venantius Fortunatus (c. 540 – c. 600), poet and bishop of Poitiers, whose Latin poems and hymns combine echoes of classical Latin poets with medieval tone
- Sextus Julius Frontinus (c. 40–103), Roman administrator and writer. His most famous work De aquaeductu, in two books written after he was appointed curator of the Roman water-supply (97)
- Aulus Gellius (c. 125–after 180), Latin author and grammarian remembered for his miscellany Attic Nights, in which many fragments of lost works are preserved
- Horace (65 BC–8 BC), Roman poet, outstanding Latin lyric poet and satirist under the emperor Augustus
- Juvenal (55/60–127), most powerful of all Roman satiric poets
- Livy (59/64 BC–AD 17), one of the great Roman historians
- Lucretius (c. 99 BC–c. 55 BC), Roman poet and philosopher known for his single, long poem, De rerum natura
- Gnaeus Naevius (c. 270 BC–c. 200 BC), second of a triad of early Latin epic poets and dramatists, between Livius Andronicus and Ennius
- Cornelius Nepos (c. 100 BC–c. 25 BC), Roman biographer. His only extant work is a collection of biographies, mostly from a lost larger work, De Viris Illustribus (on illustrious men)
- Ovid (43 BC–17 AD), Roman poet noted especially for his Ars amatoria and Metamorphoses
- Persius (34–62), Roman satirist, author of six satires, which show the influence of Horace and of Stoicism and which were imitated by John Donne and translated by John Dryden (1692)
- Petronius (d. 66 AD), reputed author of the Satyricon, a literary portrait of Roman society of the 1st century AD
- Plautus (c. 254 BC–184 BC), Roman comic dramatist, whose works, loosely adapted from Greek plays, established a truly Roman drama in the Latin language
- Pliny the Elder (23–79), Roman savant and author of the celebrated Natural History
- Pliny the Younger (61/62–c. 113), Roman author and administrator
- Sextus Propertius (55/43 BC–16 BC), elegiac poet of ancient Rome
- Gaius Musonius Rufus (1st century AD), Roman Stoic philosopher, known as the teacher of Epictetus
- Sallust (86 BC–35/34 BC), Roman historian and one of the great Latin literary stylists
- Silius Italicus (c. 26–102), Roman poet and politician. He was the author of the longest surviving Latin poem, Punica, an epic in 17 books on the Second Punic War (218–202 BC)
- Statius (c. 45–c. 96), one of the principal Roman epic and lyric poets of the Silver Age of Latin literature (18–133)
- Suetonius (69–after 122), Roman biographer and antiquarian whose writings include De viris illustribus and De vita Caesarum
- Quintus Aurelius Symmachus (c. 345–402), Roman statesman, orator and writer who was a leading opponent of Christianity
- Tibullus (c. 55 BC–c. 19 BC), Roman poet
- Marcus Terentius Varro (116 BC–27 BC), scholar and satirist, known for his Saturae Menippeae
- Marcus Velleius Paterculus (c. 19 BC–c. AD 31), Roman historian. Author of a short history of Rome which he wrote to commemorate the consulship of his friend Marcus Vinicius (AD 30)
- Virgil (70 BC–19 BC), Roman poet, known for his national epic, the Aeneid

=== The Middle Ages ===
- Albertanus of Brescia (c. 1195 – c. 1251), Latin prose writer; known work is Liber consolationis et consilii ("The book of consolation and council")
- Dante Alighieri (1265–1321), poet; known for the epic poem The Divine Comedy
- Cecco Angiolieri (c. 1260 – c. 1312), poet who is considered by some the first master of Italian comic verse
- Anselm of Canterbury (1033–1109), founder of Scholasticism; he was one of the most important Christian thinkers of the 11th century
- Thomas Aquinas (c. 1225–1274), philosopher and theologian in the scholastic tradition; his most influential work is the Summa Theologica (1265–1274) which consists of three parts
- Bonaventure (1221–1274), leading medieval theologian, philosopher, minister general of the Franciscan order and cardinal bishop of Albano. He wrote several works on the spiritual life
- Boncompagno da Signa (c. 1165/1175–1240), philosopher, grammarian and historian
- Guido Cavalcanti (c. 1255–1300), poet, a major figure among the Florentine poets
- Gioacchino da Fiore (1130–1202), theologian, mystic and esotericist. His thoughts inspired many philosophical movements as the Joachimites and the Florians
- Dino Compagni (c. 1255–1324), historical writer and political figure
- Pietro d'Abano (1257–1315), physician, philosopher, and astrologer
- Bonvesin da la Riva (c. 1240 – c. 1313), poet and writer
- Francis of Assisi (1181/1182–1226), founder of the Franciscan orders of the Friars Minor
- Giacomo da Lentini (fl. 13th century), poet. He is traditionally credited with the invention of the sonnet
- Guido delle Colonne (c. 1215 – c. 1290), jurist, poet, and Latin prose writer; author of a prose narrative of the Trojan War entitled Historia destructionis Troiae (completed about 1287)
- Guido Guinizelli (c. 1230–1276), considered a precursor of Dante and the originator of the so-called dolce stil novo, or sweet new style
- Guittone d'Arezzo (c. 1235–1294), poet and the founder of the Tuscan School
- Jacobus de Voragine (1228/30–1298), archbishop of Genoa, chronicler, and author of the Golden Legend; one of the most popular religious works of the Middle Ages
- Jacopone da Todi (c. 1230–1306), Franciscan poet; he wrote many ardent, mystical poems and is probably the author of the Latin poem Stabat Mater Dolorosa
- Lanfranc (c. 1005–1089), philosopher and theologian
- Brunetto Latini (c. 1220–1294), philosopher, scholar and statesman; wrote, in French, Li livres dou tresor, the first vernacular encyclopedia
- Peter Lombard (c. 1100–1160), theologian; his philosophical work, the Four Books of Sentences, was the standard theological text of the Middle Ages
- Marsilius of Padua (1270–1342), political philosopher, whose work Defensor pacis ("Defender of the Peace"), one of the most revolutionary of medieval documents
- Matthew of Aquasparta (1240–1302), Franciscan and scholastic philosopher
- Michael of Cesena (c. 1270–1342), Franciscan, general of that Order, and theologian
- Thomas of Celano (c. 1200 – c. 1255), Friar Minor and poet; author of three hagiographies about Saint Francis of Assisi
- Giovanni Villani (c. 1275–1348), chronicler whose European attitude to history foreshadowed Humanism

=== Humanism and the Renaissance ===
- Pietro Aretino (1492–1556), writer and satirist; known for his literary attacks on his wealthy and powerful contemporaries and for six volumes of letters
- Ludovico Ariosto (1474–1533), poet remembered for his epic poem Orlando furioso (1516)
- Pietro Bembo (1470–1547), cardinal who wrote one of the earliest Italian grammars and assisted in establishing the Italian literary language
- Francesco Berni (1497/98–1535), poet; important for the distinctive style of his Italian burlesque, which was called bernesco and imitated by many poets
- Giovanni Boccaccio (1313–1375), poet and scholar, author of De mulieribus claris, the Decameron and poems in the vernacular
- Matteo Maria Boiardo (1440/41–1494), poet whose Orlando innamorato, the first poem to combine elements of both Arthurian and Carolingian traditions of romance
- Giovanni Botero (c. 1544–1617), philosopher and diplomat, known for his work The Reason of State (1589)
- Luigi Da Porto (1485–1530), writer and storiographer, better known as the author of the novel Novella novamente ritrovata with the story of Romeo and Juliet, later adapted by William Shakespeare for his famous drama
- Leonardo Bruni (c. 1370–1444), a leading historian of his time. He wrote History of the Florentine People (1414–15); is generally considered the first modern work of history
- Giordano Bruno (1548–1600), philosopher; his major metaphysical works, De la causa, principio, et Uno (1584) and De l'infinito universo et Mondi (1584), were published in France
- Giulio Camillo (c. 1480–1544), philosopher; known for his theatre, described in his posthumously published work L’Idea del Theatro
- Tommaso Campanella(1568–1639), Dominican friar, philosopher and poet. His most significant work was The City of the Sun, a utopia describing an egalitarian theocratic society where property is held in common
- Baldassare Castiglione (1478–1529), courtier, diplomat and writer, known for his dialogue The Book of the Courtier; one of the great books of its time
- Francesco Colonna (1433–1527), author of Hypnerotomachia Poliphili.
- Cesare Cremonini (1550–1631), Aristotelian philosopher at Padua University
- Mario Equicola (c. 1470–1525), writer; author of Libro de natura de amore (1525) and Istituzioni del comporre in ogni sorta di rima della lingua volgare (1541)
- Marsilio Ficino (1433–1499), philosopher; his chief work was Theologia Platonica de immortalitate animae (1482), in which he combined Christian theology and Neoplatonic elements
- Francesco Filelfo (1398–1481), writer; author of pieces in prose, published under the title Convivia Mediolanensia, and a great many Latin translations from the Greek
- Veronica Franco (1546–1591), poet and high-ranking courtesan; famous in her day for her intellectual and artistic accomplishments
- Giovanni Battista Guarini (1538–1612), poet who, with Torquato Tasso, is credited with establishing the form of a new literary genre, the pastoral drama
- Francesco Guicciardini (1483–1540), historian; author of the most important contemporary History of Italy (1537–1540); the masterwork of Italian historical literature of the Renaissance
- Cristoforo Landino (1424–1498), writer; he wrote three works framed as philosophical dialogues: De anima (1453), De vera nobilitate (1469), and the Disputationes Camaldulenses (c. 1474)
- Niccolò Machiavelli (1469–1527), political philosopher and writer; known for his The Prince (written in 1513 and published in 1532); one of the world's most famous essays on political science
- Giannozzo Manetti (1396–1459), politician and diplomat; significant scholar of the early Italian Renaissance
- Girolamo Mei (1519–1594), writer; his treatise De modis musicis antiquorum (a study of ancient Greek music) greatly influenced the ideas of the Florentine Camerata
- Guidobaldo del Monte (1545–1607), mathematician, philosopher and astronomer; known for his work Mechanicorum Liber (1577)
- Gianfrancesco Straparola (1480–1557), writer, whose collection of 75 stories Le piacevoli notti contains the first known versions of many popular fairy tales. Along with Basile, he set the standards for the literary form of fairy tale
- Agostino Nifo (c. 1473–1538 or 1545), philosopher and commentator; his principal works are: De intellectu et daemonibus (1492) and De immortalitate animi (1518–1524)
- Marius Nizolius (1498–1576), philosopher and scholar; his major work was the Thesaurus Ciceronianus, published in 1535
- Franciscus Patricius (1529–1597), philosopher and scientist. His two great works: Discussionum peripateticorum libri XV (1571) and Nova de universis philosophia (1591)
- Petrarch (1304–1374), scholar and poet; his Il Canzoniere had enormous influence on the poets of the 15th and 16th centuries
- Alessandro Piccolomini (1508–1579), philosopher; his works include Il Dialogo della bella creanza delle donne, o Raffaella (1539) and the comedies Amor costante (1536) and Alessandro (1544)
- Giovanni Pico della Mirandola (1463–1494), scholar and Platonist philosopher; his Oration on the Dignity of Man (1486) is better known than any other philosophical text of the 15th century
- Bartolomeo Platina (1421–1481), writer and gastronomist. Author of Lives of the Popes (1479); the first systematic handbook of papal history and On honourable pleasure and health (1465); the world's first printed cookbook
- Poliziano (1454–1494), poet and philologist; among his works: Stanze per la giostra (incomplete) and Orfeo (1475)
- Pietro Pomponazzi (1462–1525), philosopher; his principal work is On the Immortality of the Soul (1516)
- Simone Porzio (1496–1554), philosopher. His principal works are: An homo bonus, vel malus volens fiat (1551) and De mente humana (1551)
- Francesco Pucci (1543–1597), philosopher; author of Forma d'una repubblica cattolica (1581)
- Luigi Pulci (1432–1484), poet; he ridiculed the heroic poems of his time in his mock epic Morgante (1478, 1483)
- Ottavio Rinuccini (1562–1621), poet, courtier and opera librettist
- Coluccio Salutati (1331–1406), philosopher, man of letters and a skilled writer; Coluccio drew heavily upon the classical tradition
- Jacopo Sannazaro (1456–1530), poet; author of Arcadia (1501–1504), first pastoral romance
- Julius Caesar Scaliger (1484–1558), scholar; author of De causis linguae Latinae (1540) and Poetics (1561)
- Sperone Speroni (1500–1588), philosopher and scholar; he was one of the central members of Padua's literary academy, Accademia degli Infiammati, and wrote on both moral and literary matters
- Torquato Tasso (1544–1595), poet, one of the foremost writers of the Renaissance, celebrated for his heroic epic poem Jerusalem Delivered (1581)
- Bernardino Telesio (1509–1588), philosopher; his chief work was De rerum natura iuxta propria principia (1565), marked the period of transition from Aristotelianism to modern thought
- Gian Giorgio Trissino (1478–1550), literary theorist, philologist, dramatist, and poet, an important innovator in Italian drama
- Lorenzo Valla (1407–1457), rhetorician, and educator who attacked medieval traditions and anticipated views of the Protestant reformers
- Lucilio Vanini (1585–1619), philosopher; author of Amphitheatrum Aeternae Providentiae Divino-Magicum (1615) and De Admirandis Naturae Reginae Deaeque Mortalium Arcanis (1616)
- Benedetto Varchi (1502/1503–1565), poet and historian; known for his work Storia fiorentina (16 vol.), published only in 1721
- Giorgio Vasari (1511–1574), writer, architect and painter, known for his entertaining biographies of artists, Le Vite de' più eccellenti architetti, pittori, et scultori italiani (1550)
- Nicoletto Vernia (1442–1499), Averroist philosopher, at the University of Padua
- Giovanni della Casa (1503–1556), poet, writer and diplomat. His Il Galateo (1558), the most celebrated etiquette book in European history, set the foundation for modern etiquette, polite behavior and manners literature

=== The Baroque period and the Enlightenment ===
- Claudio Achillini (1574–1640), poet and jurist; one of the better known Marinisti
- Vittorio Alfieri (1749–1803), tragic poet; from 1775 to 1787, wrote 19 verse tragedies; his works include Filippo (1775), Oreste (1786) and Mirra (1786)
- Francesco Algarotti (1712–1764), philosopher and art critic; author of a number of stimulating essays on the subjects of architecture (1753), the opera (1755), and painting (1762)
- Maria Gaetana Agnesi (1718–1799), philosopher and mathematician; first woman to write a mathematics handbook and first woman as mathematics professor in a university
- Giuseppe Marc'Antonio Baretti (1719–1789), literary critic; author of Italian Library (1757)
- Giambattista Basile (c. 1575–1632), poet; his collection of 50 short stories Pentamerone (1634–6), provided the content later borrowed by Charles Perrault and Brothers Grimm. With Straparola, he is one of the two fathers of fairy tale tradition
- Cesare Beccaria (1738–1794), philosopher, criminologist and jurist; works include his treatise Dei delitti e delle pene (1763–64)
- Saverio Bettinelli (1718–1808), writer; author of Lettere dieci di Virgilio agli Arcadi (1758)
- Tommaso Campanella (1568–1639), Dominican philosopher and writer; remembered for his socialistic work The City of the Sun (1602)
- Giacomo Casanova (1725–1798), was author and adventurer from the Republic of Venice
- Giuseppe Lorenzo Maria Casaregi (1670–1737), jurist and advocate
- Melchiorre Cesarotti (1730–1808), poet and translator; author of Essay on the Philosophy of Taste (1785) and Essay on the Philosophy of Languages (1785)
- Elena Cornaro Piscopia (1646–1684), philosopher, first woman to graduate from a university with a doctorate
- Lorenzo Da Ponte (1749–1838), poet and librettist; his most important librettos were for Mozart: The Marriage of Figaro (1786), Don Giovanni (1787), and Così fan tutte (1790)
- Carlo Denina (1731–1813), historian; author of Delle rivoluzioni d'Italia (1769–70) and Delle revoluzioni della Germania (1804)
- Antonio Genovesi (1712–1769), writer and political; author of Disciplinarum Metaphysicarum Elementa (1743–52) and Logica (1745)
- Pietro Giannone (1676–1748), historian and jurist; his most important work was his Il Triregno, ossia del regno del cielo, della terra, e del papa; published only in 1895
- Carlo Goldoni (1707–1793), playwright; wrote more than 260 dramatic works of all sorts, including opera
- Gasparo Gozzi (1713–1786), poet, critic and journalist. His principal writings are: Lettere famigliari (1755), Il Mondo morale (1760) and Osservatore Veneto periodico (1761)
- Giovanni Battista Guarini (1538–1612), poet and theoretician of literature; his best-known work is Il pastor fido (1590), a pastoral tragicomedy
- Scipione Maffei (1675–1755), writer and art critic; his most important works: Conclusioni di amore (1702), La scienza cavalleresca (1710) and De fabula equestris ordinis Constantiniani (1712)
- Giambattista Marino (1569–1625), poet. Founder of the school of Marinism (later Secentismo); among his principal works is L'Adone (1623), a long narrative poem
- Metastasio (1698–1782), poet and librettist; considered the most important writer of opera seria libretti. His melodrama Attilio Regolo (1750) is generally considered his masterpiece
- Ludovico Antonio Muratori (1672–1750), historian; author of Antiquitates Italicae Medii Aevi (6 vols; 1738–42) and Annali d'Italia (12 vols; 1744–49)
- Ferrante Pallavicino (1615–1644) satirist and novelist; his most important works: Baccinata ouero battarella per le api barberine (1642) and La Retorica delle puttane (1643)
- Giuseppe Parini (1729–1799), prose writer and poet; author of Dialogo sopra la nobiltà (1757) and Il giorno (4 books, 1763–1801)
- Cesare Ripa (c. 1560 – c. 1622), aesthetician and writer; author of the Iconologia overo Descrittione Dell’imagini Universali cavate dall’Antichità et da altri luoghi (1593), an influential emblem book
- Paolo Vergani (1753–1820), economist of the Papal States
- Alessandro Verri (1741–1816), novelist and reformer; author of Le avventure di Saffo poetessa di Mitilene (1782), Notti romane al sepolcro degli Scipioni (1792–1804) and La vita di Erostrato (1815)
- Pietro Verri (1728–1797), political economist and writer; his chief works are: Riflessioni sulle leggi vincolanti (1769) and Meditazioni sull' economia politica (1771)
- Giambattista Vico (1668–1744), philosopher and historian; his major theories were developed in his Scienza nuova (1725)

=== The 1800s ===
- Giuseppe Gioacchino Belli (1791–1863), poet; he described the vast panorama of Roman society in colorful dialect
- Giovanni Berchet (1783–1851), patriot and poet; he wrote stirring patriotic ballads of a romantic type and rhymed romances, such as Giulia and Matilde
- Luigi Capuana (1839–1915), critic and novelist; among his best works are the short stories in Paesane (1894) and the novel The Marquis of Roccaverdina (1901)
- Giosuè Carducci (1835–1907), poet, winner of the Nobel Prize for Literature in 1906, and one of the most influential literary figures of his age
- Carlo Collodi (1826–1890), author and journalist, best known as the creator of the canonical piece of children's literature and world's most translated non-religious book The Adventures of Pinocchio
- Gabriele D'Annunzio (1863–1938), poet, military hero and political leader; author of Il piacere (1889), L'innocente (1892), Giovanni Episcopo (1892) and Il trionfo della morte (1894)
- Edmondo De Amicis (1846–1908), novelist and short-story writer; his most important work is the sentimental children's story Heart (1886)
- Federico De Roberto (1861–1927), writer; known for his novel I Vicerè (1894)
- Francesco de Sanctis (1817–1883), historian and literary critic; important works are his Saggi critici (1866) and his Storia della letteratura italiana (1870–71)
- Antonio Fogazzaro (1842–1911), novelist and poet; his famous Piccolo mondo antico (1896), it is considered one of the great Italian novels of the 19th century
- Ugo Foscolo (1778–1827), poet and patriot; his popular novel The Last Letters of Jacopo Ortis (1802) bitterly denounced Napoleon's cession of Venetia to Austria
- Vincenzo Gioberti (1801–1852), philosopher and political writer; his most celebrated work is Del primato morale e civile degli italiani (1843)
- Giuseppe Giusti (1809–1850), satirical poet; known for his poem, Sant’Ambrogio (c. 1846)
- Raimondo Guarini (1765–1852), archaeologist, epigrapher, poet; authored the first Oscan/Latin dictionary
- Francesco Guicciardini (1851–1915), member of the Italian cabinet
- Giacomo Leopardi (1798–1837), poet and philosopher; author of Canti (1816–37), expressing a deeply pessimistic view of humanity and human nature
- Errico Malatesta (1853–1932), anarchist, theorist and revolutionary socialist.
- Alessandro Manzoni (1785–1873), poet and novelist; he is famous for the novel The Betrothed, generally ranked among the masterpieces of world literature
- Ippolito Nievo (1831–1861), writer and patriot; known for his novel Confessioni di un Italiano, also known as Confessioni d'un ottuagenario which was published posthumously in 1867
- Giovanni Pascoli (1855–1912), poet; his works include Carmina (in Latin, 1914), the more mystical Myricae (1891) and the patriotic Odi e inni (1906)
- Silvio Pellico (1789–1854), dramatic poet; his principal works are Francesca da Rimini (1818) and My Prisons (1832)
- Antonio Rosmini-Serbati (1797–1855), religious philosopher; he is known for his work, Nuovo saggio sull’origine delle idee, published in 1830
- Emilio Salgari (1862–1911), adventure novelist for the young; creator of popular heroic figure Sandokan
- Niccolò Tommaseo (1802–1874), poet and critic; editor of a Dizionario della Lingua Italiana in eight volumes (1861–74), of a dictionary of synonyms (1830) and other works
- Achille Torelli (1841–1922), playwright
- Giovanni Verga (1840–1922), novelist; his works include Cavalleria rusticana (1880), I Malavoglia (1881), Novelle rusticane (1883), and Mastro-Don Gesualdo (1889)

=== The 1900s ===
- Nicola Abbagnano (1901–1990), author of such books as La struttura dell'esistenza (1939). He was the first and most important Italian existentialist
- Corrado Alvaro (1895–1956), novelist and journalist; author of Gente in Aspromonte, considered by most critics to be his masterpiece
- Giulio Angioni (1939–2017), novelist and anthropologist
- Max Ascoli (1898–1978), philosopher and lawyer migrated in United States of America
- Giorgio Bassani (1916–2000), novelist; his most acclaimed work, The Garden of the Finzi-Continis, published in 1962
- Carmelo Bene (1937–2002), actor, poet, theater director, film director and screenwriter author of One Hamlet Less, Salomè.
- Vitaliano Brancati (1907–1954), writer; in 1950 won the Bagutta Prize
- Norberto Bobbio (1909–2004), philosopher of law and political sciences and a historian of political thought.
- Gesualdo Bufalino (1920–1996), writer; his novel, Le menzogne della notte (1988) won the Strega Prize
- Dino Buzzati (1906–1972), writer, novelist and painter; his most famous work is a novel, The Tartar Steppe, published in 1940
- Italo Calvino (1923–1985), novelist; his trilogy of historical fantasies The Cloven Viscount (1952), The Baron in the Trees (1957), and The Nonexistent Knight (1959) brought him international acclaim
- Andrea Camilleri (1925–2019), writer; the creator of the popular Inspector Salvo Montalbano
- Dino Campana (1885–1932), poet, author of Canti Orfici.
- Carlo Cassola (1917–1987), neorealist novelist; known for his novel, Bébo's Girl, published in 1960
- Benedetto Croce (1866–1952), historian, humanist, and foremost Italian philosopher of the first half of the 20th century
- Erri De Luca (born 1950), poet and writer; author of Aceto, arcobaleno (1992), Tre cavalli (2000) and Montedidio (2002)
- Victoria de Stefano (1940–2023), novelist migrated in Venezuela, essayist, philosopher and educator.
- Grazia Deledda (1871–1936), novelist. She was awarded the Nobel Prize in 1926; her best-known works are Elias Portolu (1903), Cenere (1904), and La madre (1920)
- Umberto Eco (1932–2016), novelist; internationally known for his novel The Name of the Rose (1980)
- Julius Evola (1898–1974), philosopher and social thinker; one of the leading exponents of the Hermetic tradition
- Luigi Fabbri (1877–1935), anarchist writer and educator migrated in Uruguay
- Oriana Fallaci (1929–2006), author, and political interviewer; important works are her The Rage and the Pride (2001) and The Force of Reason (2004)
- Beppe Fenoglio (1922–1963), novelist; he is known for his novel Il partigiano Johnny, which was published posthumously (and incomplete) in 1968
- Luciano Floridi (born 1964), philosopher. He is the director of the Digital Ethics Center at Yale University
- Dario Fo (1926–2016), satirist, playwright, theater director, actor, and composer. He received the Nobel Prize for Literature in 1997
- Carlo Emilio Gadda (1893–1973), novelist; known novel is That Awful Mess on Via Merulana (1957)
- Francesco Gaeta (1879–1927)
- Giovanni Gentile (1875–1944), idealist philosopher, politician, educator, and editor, sometimes called the "Philosopher of Fascism”
- Natalia Ginzburg (1916–1991), novelist; known for her novels La strada che va in città (1942), È stato così (1947) and Le voci della sera (1961)
- Giovannino Guareschi (1908–1968), journalist and novelist, known as author of The Little World of Don Camillo (tr. 1950) and its sequels
- José Ingenieros (1877–1925), physician, pharmacist, positivist philosopher and essayist.
- Tommaso Landolfi (1908–1979), author and translator; most known and translated work is An Autumn Story (1947)
- Carlo Levi (1902–1975), writer, painter, and political journalist; known for his book, Christ Stopped at Eboli, published in 1945
- Primo Levi (1919–1987), writer and chemist; his first memoir, If This Is a Man has been described as one of the most important works of the 20th century
- Claudio Magris (born 1939), writer; author of Illazioni su una sciabola (1984), Danubio (1986), Stadelmann (1988), Un altro mare (1991) and Microcosmi (1997)
- Filippo Tommaso Marinetti (1876–1944), writer and novelist. The ideological founder of Futurism; among his works are Le Roi Bombance (1905) and Futurist Manifesto (1909)
- Alda Merini (1931–2009), writer and poet.
- Eugenio Montale (1896–1981), poet whose works, which greatly influenced 20th-century Italian literature, include Le Occasioni (1939) and Satura (1962). He won the 1975 Nobel Prize for literature
- Indro Montanelli (1909–2001), journalist and historian, known for his new approach to writing history in books such as History of Rome (1957) and History of the Greeks (1959)
- Elsa Morante (1912–1985), novelist and poet; her most acclaimed work, History, published in 1974
- Alberto Moravia (1907–1990), novelist; author of Gli indifferenti (1929) and of the anti-fascist novel, The Conformist (1951)
- Aldo Palazzeschi (1885–1974), novelist and poet; known for his novel Man of Smoke published in 1911
- Cesare Pavese (1908–1950), poet, novelist and translator; his major works include Il Compagno (1947), Tra Donne Sole (1948) and The Moon and the Bonfires (1949)
- Luigi Pirandello (1867–1936), writer and dramatist, winner of the 1934 Nobel Prize for Literature; known for a series of novels and the modernist play, Six Characters in Search of an Author
- Vasco Pratolini (1913–1991), writer and novelist; his most important literary works are the novels Family Diary (1947), Chronicle of Poor Lovers (1947) and Metello (1955)
- Salvatore Quasimodo (1901–1968), poet; his works include La terra impareggiabile (1958) and Dare e avere (1966). He received the Nobel Prize for Literature in 1959
- Mario Rigoni Stern (1921–2008), his major works include Il sergente nella neve (1953), Storia di Tönle (1978) and Le stagioni di Giacomo (1995)
- Gianni Rodari (1920–1980), writer and journalist; he won the Hans Christian Andersen Award in 1970
- Alejandro Rossi (1932–2009), writer and philosopher
- Rafael Sabatini (1875–1950), Italian-British writer of novels of romance and adventure. He remains best known for The Sea Hawk (1915), Scaramouche (1921) and Captain Blood (1922)
- Giovanni Sartori (1924–2017). political scientist who specialized in the study of democracy, political parties and comparative politics.
- Leonardo Sciascia (1921–1989), writer; author of The Day of the Owl (1961) and To Each His Own (1966)
- Filippo Scòzzari (born 1946), novelist and comic writer
- Vittorio Sgarbi (born 1952), art critic, art historian, writer, politician, cultural commentator and television personality
- Ignazio Silone (1900–1978), novelist and journalist; known for his novel Fontamara (1930); was translated into 14 languages
- Italo Svevo (1861–1928), novelist; his best-known work, which has been called Italy's first modernist novel, is Zeno's Conscience (1923)
- Antonio Tabucchi (1943–2012), writer; author of Notturno Indiano (1984) and Sostiene Pereira (1994)
- Susanna Tamaro (born 1957), novelist. Known for the bestseller Va' dove ti porta il cuore (1994)
- Giuseppe Tomasi di Lampedusa (1896–1957), novelist; internationally renowned for his work, The Leopard, published posthumously in 1958
- Pier Vittorio Tondelli (1955–1991), writer; author of Altri Libertini (1980) and Dinner Party (1994)
- Federigo Tozzi (1883–1920), writer; known for his novel Con gli occhi chiusi published in 1919
- Giuseppe Ungaretti (1888–1970), poet, founder of the Hermetic movement that brought about a reorientation in modern Italian poetry
- Elio Vittorini (1908–1966), novelist; his works, among them The Twilight of the Elephant (1947) and The Red Carnation (1948), make a serious attempt to assess the Fascist experience

== Other Notables ==
- The Italian Tenors, Italian trio opera singers
- Il Volo, Italian trio tenors
- Michelangelo (1475–1564), Italian sculptor, painter, architect, and poet of the High Renaissance
- PANDA BOI (born 2002), Italian internet celebrity
- Giovanni Agnelli (1866–1945), entrepreneur. Founder of the Fiat (Fabbrica Italiana Automobili Torino) automobile
- Jorge Alessandri (1896–1986), was the 27th President of Chile from 1958 to 1964y
- Domenico Agusta (1907–1971), entrepreneur. CEO of the Agusta aeronautical company following the death of his father in 1927, and founded the MV Agusta motorcycle company in 1945
- Franco Archibugi (1926–2020), economist and planner
- Giorgio Armani (1934–2025), fashion designer, socialite and businessman
- Guido Barilla (born 1958), businessman, and the chairman of Barilla Group, the world's largest pasta company
- Rabbi Berel Lazar (born in 1964) Chief Rabbi of Russia
- Edoardo Bianchi (1865–1946), entrepreneur and inventor who founded the bicycle manufacturing company Bianchi in 1885 and the Italian automobile manufacturer Autobianchi
- Marcel Bich (1914–1994), entrepreneur, co-founder of the worldwide famous company Bic. He created what would become the most popular and best selling pen in the World, Bic Cristal
- Luciano Benetton (born 1935), businessman, co-founders of Benetton Group, the reknowed Italian fashion brand.
- Bartolomeo Beretta (c. 1490 – c. 1565). known as maestro di canne (master gun-barrel maker), was ann artisan who, by 1526, had established the arms manufacturing enterprise Beretta.
- Fortunato Brescia Tassano (died 1951), businessman who founded Grupo Breca, a real estate company-turned-conglomerate. He emigrated to Peru in 1889.
- Ettore Bugatti (1881–1947), automobile designer and manufacturer. Founder of the manufacturing company Automobiles E. Bugatti in 1909 in the then German town of Molsheim in the Alsace region of what is now France
- Giovanni da Carignano (1250–1329), pioneering cartographer from Genoa.
- Gaspare Campari (1828–1882), drinks manufacturer. In 1860 he formulated the bitter Campari. His recipe, which Campari keeps confidential, contained more than 60 natural ingredients
- Marilù Capparelli Italian lawyer at Google
- Pierre Cardin (1922–2020), fashion designer. He is known for what were his avant-garde style and Space Age designs; also know neckties and handkerchief maker
- Leo Castelli Italian art trader
- Roberto Cavalli (born 1940), fashion designer and inventor. He is known for exotic prints and for creating the sand-blasted look for jeans.
- Vittoria Ceretti (born 1998), fashion supermodel was discovered in 2012 through the Elite Model Look Model contest.
- Ernesto Cerruti (1844–1915), entreprenour migrated in Colombia
- Nino Cerruti (1930–2022), businessman and stylist. He founded his own haute couture house,
- Raffaele Cicala (c. 1960), businessman, CEO of LaSer Group.
- Giorgio Cini, entrepreneur
- Francesco Cirio (1836–1900), businessman, is credited with being one of the first in the world with developing the appertization technique in Italy
- Luca Cordero di Montezemolo (born 1947), businessman, former Chairman of Ferrari, and formerly Chairman of Fiat S.p.A. and President of Confindustria
- Ortensia Curiel, Italian designer founder of Curiel fashion brand in 1908
- Pompeo D'Ambrosio (1917–1998), entrepreneur as financial manager of Banco Latino for the promotion of many successful Italian entrepreneurs in Venezuela. He was even co-founder for Deportivo Italia, the soccer club of the Italian community in Venezuela
- Ida d'Este (1917–1976), educator and partisan
- Carlo De Benedetti (born 1934), industrialist, engineer, and publisher.
- Giuseppe De'Longhi (born 1939), businessman and the president of De'Longhi Group
- Torcuato di Tella (1892–1948), industrialist and philanthropist migrated in Argentine
- Pietro D'Onofrio (1859–1937), founder of a Peruvian brand and business dedicated primarily to the sale of confectionery products
- Salvatore Falabella founder of multinational chain of department stores owned by Chilean multinational company SARA Falabella. It is the largest South American department store
- Jean Marie Farina (1685–1766, perfumier migrated in Germany who created the first Eau de Cologne
- Gaetano Filangieri (1752–1788), economist and state adviser; he is known for his work, The Science of Legislation (vols. 1–7; 1780–85)
- Vincenzo Florio (1883–1959), entrepreneur, heir of the rich Florio dynasty. An automobile enthusiast he is best known as the founder of the Targa Florio car racing.
- Ferdinando Galiani (1728–1787), economist; he published two treatises, Della Moneta (1750) and Dialogues sur le commerce des blés (1770)
- Fortune Gallo (1878–1970) - Opera impresario
- Gaetano Greco, industrialist cofounder of Venezuelan football team Deportivo Táchira F.C.
- Domenico Dolce (born 1958), fashion designer and entrepreneur and co-founder of the Dolce & Gabbana luxury fashion house
- Emilio Pucci, Marquees di Barsento (1914–1992), fashion designer and politician
- Gianfranco Faina, Italian professor (?–1981)
- Edoardo Fendi (1904–1954), fashion designer cofounder of a fur and leather Fendi shop in Via del Plebiscito, Rome.
- Salvatore Ferragamo (1898–1960), shoe designer and the founder of luxury goods high-end retailer Salvatore Ferragamo S.p.A.
- Enzo Ferrari (1898–1988), motor racing driver and entrepreneur, the founder of the Ferrari Grand Prix results and the Ferrari automobile marque
- Gianfranco Ferre (1944–2007), fashion designer also known as "the architect of fashion"
- Pietro Ferrero (1898–1949), founder of Ferrero SpA, a confectionery and chocolatier company. His company invented Nutella, a hazelnut-cream spread, which is now sold in over 160 countries
- Micol Fontana (1913–2015), stylist and entrepreneur. Along with her two sisters Micol Fontana was stylist and co-founder of the Sorelle Fontana fashion house
- Stefano Gabbana (born 1962), fashion designer and co-founder of the Dolce & Gabbana luxury fashion house
- Filippo Gagliardi (1912 - 1968), entreprenour migrated in Venezuela
- Raul Gardini (1933–1993), entrepreneur. In 1980 as CEO of Ferruzzi Group led the acquisition of Beeghin-Say SA. In 1987, bought the Montedison chemical group. In 1989 Eni and Montedison formed a joint-venture called Enimont.
- Filippo Grandi (born 1957), diplomat, current United Nations High Commissioner for Refugees
- Giovanni Achille Gaggia (1895–1961), inventor of the first modern steamless coffee machine on 5 September 1938, to be used commercially in his coffee bar.
- Palizzolo Gravina, baron of Ramione, 19th century heraldic writer
- Guccio Gucci (1881–1953), businessman and fashion designer. He is known for being the founder of the fashion house of Gucci.
- Lucia Guerrini (1921–1990), classical scholar and archaeologist
- Carlo Guzzi (1889–1964), co-founder of Moto Guzzi
- Andrea Illy (born 1964), businessman. He is the Chairman of illycaffè S.p.A., a family coffee business founded in Trieste in 1933
- Ferdinando Innocenti (1891–1966), businessman who founded the machinery-works company Innocenti and was the creator of the Lambretta motorscooter.
- Barbara Labate (born 1978), entrepreneur, co-founder of the successful shopping site Risparmio Super
- Aldus Manutius (1449–1515), humanist, scholar, educator, and the founder of the Aldine Press
- Javier Gerardo Milei (born 1970), politician and economist; he is the President of Argentina since 2023.
- Mario Moretti Polegato (born 1952), entrepreneur, active in the footwear sector, who founded the company Geox of which he is the president
- Antonio Pasin (1897–1990), industrialist founder of the Radio Flyer company, best known for making the Radio Flyer stamped steel toy wagon
- Augusto Perfetti (born 1951), businessman; executive chairman of Perfetti Van Melle
- Stefano Pessina (born 1941), businessman; executive chairman and large investor in The Boots GroupWalgreens
- Enrico Piaggio (1805–1965), industrialist took the decision to diversify his aeronautical plant into manufacturing Vespa scooters.
- Charles Ponzi (1882–1949), swindler and artist in the U.S. and Canada
- Francesco Antonio Broccu (1797–1882), artisan. Generally regarded as the inventor of Revolver (1833)
- Alessandro Cagliostro (1743–1795), charlatan, magician, and adventurer who enjoyed enormous success in Parisian high society in the years preceding the French Revolution
- Ambrogio Calepino (c. 1440–1510), one of the earliest Italian lexicographers, from whose name came the once-common Italian word calepino and English word calepin, for "dictionary"
- Antonio Benedetto Carpano (1764–1815), distiller. Inventor of vermouth and aperitif (1786)
- Bartolomeo Cristofori (1655–1731), harpsichord maker generally credited with the invention of the piano (c. 1700)
- Francesco Datini (1335–1410), merchant whose business and private papers, preserved in Prato, constitute one of the most important archives of the economic history of the Middle Ages
- Lorenzo de Tonti (c. 1602 – c. 1684), banker. The inventor of the system of annuities, now known as the tontine (1653)
- Giuseppe Donati (1835–1925), musician. Inventor of the classical ocarina
- Giovanni Falcone (1939–1992), magistrate who was specialised in prosecuting Cosa Nostra criminals. His life story is quite similar to that of his closest friend Paolo Borsellino
- Rosina Ferrario (1888–1957), first Italian woman to receive a pilot's licence in January 1913
- Andrea Fogli, product designer and interior designer
- Riccardo Gualino (1879–1964), business magnate and art collector. He was also a patron of business empire based on forest concessions, cargo ships, banking, manufacture of rayon, confectionery, chemicals, artificial leather and film producer.
- Domenico Ghirardelli (1817–1894), chocolatier who was the founder of the Ghirardelli Chocolate Company in San Francisco, California.
- Jose Greco (1918–2000), dancer and choreographer. Popularized Spanish dance in the 1950s and '60s sometimes earning him the title "the world's greatest non-Spanish Spanish dancer". The Spanish government knighted him in 1962
- Johann Maria Farina (1685–1766), perfume designer and maker. Inventor of Eau de Cologne (1709)
- Dino De Laurentiis (1919–2010), film producer. He produced or co-produced more than 500 films, of which 38 were nominated for Academy Awards.
- Sonia Gandhi (born 1946), Italian-born Indian politician and the president of the Indian National Congress, widow of former Prime minister Rajiv Gandhi
- Ugolino della Gherardesca (c. 1220–1289), nobleman, whose death by starvation with his sons and grandsons is described by Dante in the Inferno (Canto XXXIII)
- John of Montecorvino (1246–1328), Franciscan and founder of the Catholic mission in China
- Angelo Moriondo (1851–1914), inventor, who is usually credited with patenting the earliest known espresso machine, in 1884
- Vittorio Necchi (1898–1975), co-founder of Necchi Sewing machine SPA
- Lisa del Giocondo (1479–1542 or c. 1551), her name was given to Mona Lisa, her portrait commissioned by her husband and painted by Leonardo da Vinci during the Italian Renaissance
- Giovanni Paolo Lancelotti (1522–1590), jurist
- Ferruccio Lamborghini (1916–1993), automobile designer, inventor, engineer, winemaker, industrialist and businessman who created in 1963, *Automobili Lamborghini, maker of high-end sports cars
- Luigi Lavazza (1859–1949), businessman. In 1895, he founded the Lavazza coffee company in Turin
- Lokanātha (1897–1966), was known as Salvatore Cioffi before ordination, a prominent Italian Buddhist monk and missionary
- Alessandro Martini (1812–1905), businessman, founder of one of the most important vermouth companies in the world, Martini & Rossi, which produces the Martini vermouth.
- Enrico Mattei (1906–1962), public administrator of Eni
- Vittorio Missoni (1954–2013), CEO of Missoni, the fashion house founded by his parents in 1953. He is credited with expanding Missoni into a global brand after his parents handed control to him and his two siblings, Angela and Luca, in 1996
- Arnoldo Mondadori (1889–1971), entrepreneur who in 1907 founded the biggest publishing company in Italy.
- Edgardo Mortara (1851–1940), priest, central figure in a controversy that arose when at the age of 6 he was forcibly taken from his Jewish parents because a domestic servant had baptized him
- Primo Nebiolo (1923–1999), sports official, best known as president of the worldwide athletics federation IAAF from 1981 to his die in 1999. He was the ideator of the IAAF Continental Cup
- Aldo Notari (1932–2006), businessman was president of the International Baseball Federation from 1993 to 2006
- Giuseppe Panza (1923–2010), art collector
- Calogero Paparoni (1876–1958), coffee trader migrated to Venezuela
- Rinaldo Piaggio (1864–1938), entrepreneur, senator, and founder of Piaggio Group
- Generoso Papa (1891–1950), businessman and the owner of a chain of Italian-language newspapers in major USA cities
- Carlo Ponti (1912–2007), film producer. Along with Dino De Laurentiis, he popularized Italian cinema post-World War II,
- Aurelio Peccei (1908–1984), industrialist and philanthropist, co-founder of the Club of Roma
- Giovanni Battista Pirelli (1848–1932), founder of Pirelli, the company specialised in rubber and derivative processes
- Nina Ricci (1883–1970), fashion designer. She and her son Robert founded the fashion house Nina Ricci in Paris in 1932. It has been owned by the Spanish company Puig since 1998
- Giovanni Ricordi (1785–1853), founder of Casa Ricordi
- Cola di Rienzo (c. 1313–1354), popular leader who tried to restore the greatness of ancient Rome
- Angelo Rizzoli (1889–1970); publisher and film producer
- Sacco and Vanzetti case (1888–1927, 1891–1927), controversial murder trial in Massachusetts, United States, extending over seven years, 1920–27, and resulting in the execution of the defendants
- Massimo Salvadori (1908–1992), historian
- Girolamo Savonarola (1452–1498), Christian preacher, reformer, and martyr, renowned for his clash with tyrannical rulers and a corrupt clergy
- Elsa Schiaparelli (1890–1973), fashion designer. Along with Coco Chanel, her greatest rival, she is regarded as one of the most prominent European figures in fashion between the two World Wars
- Michela Schiff Giorgini (1923–1978), Egyptologist
- Maria Signorelli (1908–1992), puppet master and puppet collector from Rome
- Father Simpliciano of the Nativity (1827–1898), founder of the Congregation of the Franciscan Sisters of the Sacred Hearts in Santa Balbina
- Calisto Tanzi (1938–2022), businessman and convicted fraudster. He founded Parmalat in 1961, after dropping out of college.
- Michele Taddei, leather craftsman co-founder of Bottega Veneta a luxury fashion house. Its product lines include ready-to-wear, handbags, shoes, accessories, and jewelry; and it licenses its name and branding to Coty, Inc. for fragrances
- Emilia Telese (born 1973), audio and visual performing artist
- Augusto Odone (1933–2013, 1939–2000, 1978–2008), noted for the creation of Lorenzo's oil as a treatment to Adrenoleukodystrophy after his son, Lorenzo, was diagnosed with the rare and deadly disease.
- Miuccia Prada (born 1949), fashion designer and businesswoman
- Andrea Rossi (born 1950); entrepreneur known for Petroldragon, Energy Catalyzer who claims to have invented a cold fusion device.
- Sergio Rossi(1935–2020), shoe designer, who founded his brand
- Bornio da Sala (15th century–1496), lawyer, humanist, writer and law professor
- Alberto Sangiovanni-Vincentelli (born on 1947), computer engineer. Professor at University of California, Berkeley. Co-founded Cadence Design Systems and Synopsys,
- Emilio Schuberth (1904–1972), fashion designer, popular in the 1940s and 1950s. Schuberth was called the "tailor of the stars"
- Filippo Sindoni (1936–2007), businessman migrated in Venezuela, his activities spiked in food and media branches
- Gian Carlo Stucky (1881–1941), businessman and politician.
- Valentino (born 1932), fashion designer, the founder of the Valentino brand and company.
- Donatella Versace (born 1955), fashion designer, businesswoman, socialite, and model. In 1997, she inherited a portion of the Versace brand and became its creative director. She is currently the brand's chief creative officer. Along with her brother Gianni, she is widely credited for the supermodel phenomenon of the 1990s by casting editorial models on the runway
- Gianni Versace (1946–1997), fashion designer, socialite and businessman.
- Bruno Vespa (born 1944), journalist. A former director of the Rai Uno's news program TG1, founding host of the talk show Porta a Porta (English:"Door to door"), which has been broadcast without interruption on RAI channels since 1996.
- Simonetta Vespucci (c. 1453 – 26 April 1476), nicknamed la bella Simonetta, Italian Renaissance noblewoman from Genoa
- Giuseppe Volpi, 1st Count of Misurata (1877– 1947), businessman and politician.
- Antonio Luigi Zanussi (1890–1946), entrepreneur, founder of electrodomestic Zanuzzi Group
- Paola Zancani Montuoro (1901–1987), classical archaeologist
- Massimo Zanetti (born 1948), entrepreneur and former politician, owner of Segafredo, a global coffee company.
- Ermenegildo Zegna (born 1955), entrepreneur and manager. He is CEO of the eponymous luxury fashion house Ermenegildo Zegna.
- Emma Morano (1899-2017), oldest recorded person in Italian history and last known person from the 1800s.

== See also ==
- List of Italian Americans
- List of people by nationality
- List of Sardinians
- List of Sicilians
