= List of Italian scientists =

This is a list of notable Italian scientists organized by the era in which they were active.

== Ancient ==
- Parmenides (530 BC–460 BC), İtalian-Greek philosopher, defender of rationalism in philosophy
- Marcus Terentius Varro (116 BC–27 BC), mathematician, astronomer, philosopher, founder of the wise Roman calendar
- Adrastus of Cyzicus (116 BC–27 BC), astronomer
- Cicero (106 BC–43 BC), philosopher
- Lucretius (94 BC–55 BC), philosopher, Scientist named after the crater on the Moon
- Virgil (70 BC–19 BC), philosopher and poet
- Livy (59 BC–17 BC), historian
- Seneca (4–65), philosopher
- Pliny the Elder (23–79), botanist, natural philosopher
- Pliny the Younger (61–113), inventor, scholar and philosopher
- Marcus Aurelius (121–180), philosopher, emperor
- Augustine Of Hippo (354–430), philosopher
- Boethius (480–524), philosopher, mathematician, astronomer, theorists

== Middle Ages ==
- Mondino de Liuzzi (c. 1270–1326), physician and anatomist whose Anathomia corporis humani (MS. 1316; first printed in 1478) was the first modern work on anatomy
- Guido da Vigevano (c. 1280–c. 1349), physician and inventor who became one of the first writers to include illustrations in a work on anatomy
- Trotula (11th–12th centuries), physician who wrote several influential works on women's medicine; whose texts on gynecology and obstetrics were widely used for several hundred years in Europe
- Rogerius (before 1140–c. 1195), surgeon who wrote a work on medicine entitled Practica Chirurgiae ("The Practice of Surgery") around 1180
- Roland of Parma (1198–c. 1250), surgeon whose commentary on his teacher's Practica Chirurgiae, known as the Rolandina, became the standard surgical textbook in the West for the next three centuries
- Giovanni Dondi dell'Orologio (1330–1388), doctor and clock-maker at Padua, son of Jacopo Dondi, builder of the Astrarium
- Jacopo Dondi dell'Orologio (1293–1359), doctor and clock-maker at Padua, father of Giovanni
- Leonardo Fibonacci (c. 1170–c. 1250), mathematician, eponym of the Fibonacci number sequence, considered to be the most talented Western mathematician of the Middle Ages

== Renaissance ==
- Leon Battista Alberti (1404–1472), humanist, art theorist, artist, architect, philosopher, engineer, mathematician, inventor, and author, considered the prototype of the Renaissance universal man
- Benedetto Cotrugli (1416–1469), merchant, economist, scientist, diplomat and humanist; his Della mercatura e del mercante perfetto contains an early description of the double-entry bookkeeping system, predating Luca Pacioli's Summa de arithmetica of 1494
- Leonardo da Vinci (1452–1519), philosopher, astronomer, architect, engineer, inventor, mathematician, anatomist, geologist, cartographer, sculptor, botanist, writer, father of hydraulic science, painter of Mona Lisa and Last Supper, regarded by many as the greatest genius in history
- Domenico Maria Novara (1454–1504), professor of astronomy at the University of Bologna for 21 years, had Nicolaus Copernicus among his notable students
- Vannoccio Biringuccio (c. 1480–c. 1539), engineer and metallurgist whose work De la pirotechnia pioneered scientific and technical literature.
- Jacopo Berengario da Carpi (c. 1460–c. 1530), physician and anatomist who was the first to describe the heart valves
- Paolo dal Pozzo Toscanelli (1397–1482), mathematician, astronomer and cosmographer who influenced Christopher Columbus
- Piero Borgi (1424–1484), mathematician, author of many of the best books on arithmetic written in the 15th Century
- Francesco Maurolico (1494–1575), mathematician and astronomer, made contributions to the fields of geometry, optics, conics, mechanics and music, edited the works of classical authors as Archimedes, Apollonius, Theodosius and many others
- Ulisse Aldrovandi (1522–1605), naturalist, noted for his systematic and accurate observations of animals, plants and minerals
- Gaspare Aselli (c. 1581–1625), physician who contributed to the knowledge of the circulation of body fluids by discovering the lacteal vessels
- Gerolamo Cardano (1501–1576), mathematician and physician; initiated the general theory of cubic and quartic equations; emphasized the need for both negative and complex numbers
- Bartolomeo Eustachi (1500 or 1514–1574), anatomist, described many structures in the human body, including the Eustachian tube of the ear
- Federico Commandino (1509–1575), humanist and mathematician, translator of many works of ancient mathematicians, the proposition known as Commandino's theorem first appears in his work on centers of gravity
- Giacomo Antonio Cortuso (1513–1603), botanist
- Andrea Cesalpino (1519–1603), physician, philosopher and botanist, produced the first scientific classification of plants and animals by genera and species
- Realdo Colombo (c. 1516–1559), one of the first anatomists in the Western world to describe pulmonary circulation
- Costanzo Varolio (1543–1575), remembered for his studies on the anatomy of the brain, and his description of the pons that bears his name
- Gasparo Tagliacozzi (1546–1599), plastic surgeon; considered a pioneer in the field; called the father of plastic surgery
- Girolamo Fracastoro (1478–1553), physician and scholar; first to state the germ theory of infection; regarded as the founder of scientific epidemiology
- Luca Pacioli (1446/7–1517), mathematician and founder of accounting; popularized the system of double bookkeeping for keeping financial records; often cited as the father of modern accounting
- Lodovico Ferrari (1522–1565), mathematician, famous for having discovered the solution of the general quartic equation
- Luca Ghini (1490–1556), physician and botanist, best known as the creator of the first recorded herbarium and founder of the world's first botanical garden
- Aloysius Lilius (c. 1510–1576), astronomer and physician; principal author of the Gregorian Calendar (1582)
- Gabriele Falloppio (1523–1562), anatomist and physician; important discoveries include the fallopian tubes, leading from uterus to ovaries
- Scipione del Ferro (1465–1526), mathematician, the first to discover a method to solve the depressed cubic equation
- Niccolò Fontana Tartaglia (1499–1557), mathematician who originated the science of ballistics
- Giambattista della Porta (c. 1535–1615), scholar and polymath, known for his work Magia Naturalis (1558), which dealt with alchemy, magic, and natural philosophy
- Franciscus Patricius (1529–1597), philosopher and scientist, defender of Platonism and opponent of Aristotelianism, opposed the traditional view of the meaning of historical studies, which was usually restricted to moral instruction, with his concept of a broad, neutral, scientific historical research
- Michele Mercati (1541–1593), physician, one of the first to recognize prehistoric stone tools as man-made
- Rafael Bombelli (1526–1572), mathematician, a central figure in the understanding of imaginary numbers, was the first to document the rules of addition and multiplication of complex numbers
- Ignazio Danti (1536–1586), Dominican mathematician, astronomer, cosmographer, and cartographer
- Hieronymus Fabricius (1537–1619), anatomist and surgeon, called the founder of modern embryology
- Leonardo Garzoni (1543–1592), Jesuit natural philosopher; author of the first known example of a modern treatment of magnetic phenomena
- Guidobaldo del Monte (1545–1607), mathematician, philosopher and astronomer, a staunch friend of Galileo, wrote a highly influential book about perspective
- Matteo Ricci (1552–1610), missionary to China, mathematician, linguist and published the first Chinese edition of Euclid's Elements
- Giordano Bruno (1548–1600)
- Pietro Cataldi (1548–1626), mathematician, discovered the sixth and seventh perfect numbers; his discovery of the 7th (for p=19) held the record for the largest known prime for almost two centuries, until Leonhard Euler discovered that 231 - 1 was the eighth Mersenne prime
- Paolo Sarpi (1552–1623), historian, scientist, canon lawyer, and statesman on behalf of the Venetian Republic, highly critical of the Scholastic tradition, a proponent of the Copernican system, his extensive network of correspondents included Francis Bacon and William Harvey
- Giovanni Antonio Magini (1555–1617), astronomer, astrologer, cartographer and mathematician, known for his reduced size edition of Ptolemy's Geographiae (1596)
- Fausto Veranzio (1551–1617), polymath and inventor from the Republic of Venice; his most important work Machinae Novae describes 49 machines, tools and technical concepts that predated many future inventions
- Prospero Alpini (1553–1617), physician and botanist, wrote several botanical treatises covering exotic plants; his description of coffee and banana plants are the oldest in European literature

== 17th century ==
- Antonio Filippo Ciucci (d.1710), physician, one of first forensic toxicologists
- Giovanni Battista Riccioli (1598–1671), astronomer, devised the system for the nomenclature of lunar features that is now the international standard
- Sanctorius (1561–1636), physiologist and physician; laid the foundation for the study of metabolism
- Galileo Galilei (1564–1642), physicist and astronomer; founder of modern science; accurately described the heliocentric Solar System
- Federico Cesi (1585–1630), scientist and naturalist, founder of the Accademia dei Lincei
- Eustachio Divini (1610–1685), mathematician, astronomer, physicist, the first scientist to develop the techniques necessary for the construction of optical instruments.
- Vincenzo Viviani (1622–1703), mathematician
- Gjuro Baglivi (1668–1707), physician and scientist; published the first clinical description of pulmonary edema; made classic observations on the histology and physiology of muscle
- Giovanni Alfonso Borelli (1608–1679), physiologist and physicist who was the first to explain muscular movement and other body functions according to the laws of statics and dynamics
- Giuseppe Campani (1635–1715), optician and astronomer who invented a lens-grinding lathe
- Giovanni Domenico Cassini (1625–1712), mathematician, astronomer and engineer who was the first to observe four of Saturn's moons and the co-discoverer of the Great Red Spot on Jupiter
- Bonaventura Cavalieri (1598–1647), mathematician, invented the method of indivisibles (1635) that foreshadowed integral calculus
- Giacinto Cestoni (1637–1718), naturalist, studied fleas and algae, and showed that scabies is provoked by Sarcoptes scabiei (1689)
- Giovanni Battista Hodierna (1597–1660), astronomer, one of the first to create a catalog of celestial objects with a telescope
- Niccolò Zucchi (1586–1670), astronomer and physicist; may have been the first to observe belts on the planet Jupiter with a telescope (on 17 May 1630), also claimed to have explored the idea of a reflecting telescope in 1616, predating Galileo Galilei and Giovanni Francesco Sagredo's discussions of the same idea a few years later
- Giovanni Battista Zupi (c. 1590–1650), astronomer and mathematician; discovered that the planet Mercury had orbital phases
- Elena Cornaro Piscopia (c. 1646–1684), philosopher, musician, and mathematician, the first woman in the world to receive a Ph.D. degree
- Antonio Vallisneri (1661–1730), physician and naturalist who made numerous experiments in entomology and human organology, and combated the doctrine of spontaneous generation
- Antonio Maria Valsalva (1666–1723), professor of anatomy at Bologna; described several anatomical features of the ear in his book De aure humana tractatus (1704)
- Evangelista Torricelli (1608–1647), physicist and mathematician, inventor of the barometer (1643)
- Tito Livio Burattini (1617–1681), mathematician, in his book Misura Universale, published in 1675, first suggested the name meter as the name for a unit of length
- Francesco Stelluti (1577–1652), polymath who worked in the fields of mathematics, microscopy, literature and astronomy; in 1625 he published the first accounts of microscopic observation
- Marcello Malpighi (1628–1694), physician and biologist; regarded as the founder of microscopic anatomy and may be regarded as the first histologist
- Francesco Maria Grimaldi (1618–1663), physicist and mathematician; noted for his discoveries in the field of optics; first to describe the diffraction of light
- Geminiano Montanari (1633–1687), astronomer; known for his discovery of the variability of the star Algol (c. 1667)
- Giovanni Maria Lancisi (1654–1720), clinician and anatomist who is considered the first modern hygienist
- Bernardino Ramazzini (1633–1714), physician, considered a founder of occupational medicine
- Francesco Redi (1626–1697), physician who demonstrated that the presence of maggots in putrefying meat does not result from spontaneous generation but from eggs laid on the meat by flies
- Luigi Ferdinando Marsili (1658–1730), scholar, natural scientist and soldier, one of the founders of modern oceanography
- Giovanni Ceva (1647–1734), mathematician, widely known for proving Ceva's theorem in elementary geometry
- Cipriano Targioni (1672–1748), scientific instrument maker.

== 18th century ==
- Giovanni Girolamo Saccheri (1667–1733), philosopher and mathematician who did early work on non-Euclidean geometry, although he did not see it as such
- Maria Gaetana Agnesi (1718–1799), linguist, mathematician and philosopher, considered to be the first woman in the Western world to have achieved a reputation in mathematics
- Laura Bassi (1711–1778), scientist who was the first woman to become a physics professor at a European university
- Ruggiero Giuseppe Boscovich (1711–1787), physicist, astronomer, mathematician, philosopher, diplomat, poet, theologian, Jesuit priest, a precursor of the atomic theory, made many contributions to astronomy, also discovered the absence of atmosphere on the Moon
- Giuseppe Toaldo (1719–1797), physicist, gave special attention to the study of atmospheric electricity and to the means of protecting buildings against lightning
- Anna Morandi Manzolini (1714–1774), internationally known anatomist and anatomical wax artist who lectured at the University of Bologna
- Giovanni Manzolini (1700–1755), well-known maker of anatomical models and Professor of anatomy at Bologna
- Giovanni Battista Belzoni (1778–1823), prolific explorer and pioneer archaeologist of Egyptian antiquities
- Lazzaro Spallanzani (1729–1799), biologist and physiologist, called the father of artificial insemination (done at Pavia in 1784)
- Giovanni Arduino (1714–1795), father of Italian geology, who established bases for stratigraphic chronology by classifying the four main layers of the Earth's crust
- Luigi Galvani (1737–1798), physician and physicist, noted for his discovery of animal electricity
- Giuseppe Luigi Lagrange (1736–1813), mathematician and astronomer who contributed in the fields of mechanics, number theory and analysis, known for Lagrangian points and Lagrangian mechanics
- Jacopo Riccati (1676–1754), mathematician, known in connection with his problem, called Riccati's equation, published in the Acla eruditorum (1724)
- Luigi Guido Grandi (1671–1742), philosopher, mathematician and engineer, known for studying the rose curve, a curve which has the shape of a petalled flower, and for Grandi's series
- Tiberius Cavallo (1749–1809), physicist and natural philosopher who wrote on the early experiments with electricity; was known contemporaneously as the inventor of Cavallo's multiplier
- Giuseppe Piazzi (1746–1826), mathematician and astronomer who discovered and named the first asteroid, or "minor planet", Ceres
- Carlo Amoretti (1741–1816), scholar, writer, and scientist, his mind encompassed theology, physics, geology, paleography, geography, and art history
- Pellegrino Turri, built the first typewriter proven to have worked (1808); invented carbon paper (1806)
- Alessandro Volta (1745–1827), electricity pioneer, eponym of the volt, inventor of the electric battery (1800)
- Luigi Valentino Brugnatelli (1761–1818), chemist and discoverer of the electroplating process (1802-'05)
- Tommaso Campailla (1668–1740), physician, philosopher and poet, inventor of "vapour stovens" that he used to fight syphilis rheumatism
- Giuseppe Olivi (1769–1795), abbot and naturalist, his wide interests stretched from chemistry, passing through mineralogy and agriculture, to botany; one of the first to make observations under the water

== 19th century ==
- Amedeo Avogadro (1776–1856), chemist, most noted for his contribution to molecular theory now known as Avogadro's law, which states that equal volumes of gases under the same conditions of temperature and pressure will contain equal numbers of molecules.
- Giovanni Battista Amici (1786–1863), astronomer and microscopist, inventor of the catadioptric microscope (presented at the Arts and Industry Exhibition in Milan in 1812)
- Giulio Bizzozero (1846–1901), anatomist, known as the original discoverer of Helicobacter pylori (1893)
- Leopoldo Marco Antonio Caldani (1725–1813), anatomist and physiologist; noted for his experimental studies on the function of the spinal cord
- Temistocle Calzecchi-Onesti (1853–1922), physicist, invented a tube filled with iron filings, called a "coherer" (1884)
- Stanislao Cannizzaro (1826–1910), chemist, in 1858 put an end to confusion over values to be attributed to atomic weights, using Avogadro's hypothesis
- Giovanni Battista Brocchi (1772–1826), naturalist, mineralogist and geologist, presented the thesis that species, like individuals, age and eventually die out, that later influenced Charles Darwin
- Antonio Cardarelli (1831–1926), physician remembered for describing Cardarelli's sign
- Olinto De Pretto (1857–1921), industrialist and geologist, may have been the first person to derive the energy–mass-equivalence $E=mc^2$, generally attributed to Albert Einstein
- Vincenzo Cerulli (1859–1927), astronomer, the author of the idea that the canali are just a special kind of optical illusion
- Ernesto Cesàro (1859–1906), mathematician; in 1880 he developed methods of finding the sum of divergent series; made important contributions to intrinsic geometry
- Agostino Codazzi (1793–1859), soldier, scientist, geographer, cartographer
- Gabrio Piola (1794–1850), physicist and mathematician who made fundamental contributions to continuum mechanics
- Vincenzo Chiarugi (1759–1820), physician who introduced humanitarian reforms to the psychiatric hospital care of people with mental disorders
- Francesco de Vico (1805–1848), astronomer, discovered a number of comets, including periodic comets 54P/de Vico-Swift-NEAT and 122P/de Vico
- Ulisse Dini (1845–1918), mathematician and politician whose most important work was on the theory of functions of real variables
- Giovanni Battista Donati (1826–1873), astronomer, one of the first to systematically adapt the new science of spectroscopy to astronomy
- Angelo Dubini (1813–1902), physician who identified Ancylostoma duodenale (1838)
- Girolamo Segato (1792–1836), egyptologist and anatomist, best known for his unique work in the petrifaction of human cadavers
- Francesco Faà di Bruno (1825–1888), mathematician, known for the Faà di Bruno formula (1855, 1857)
- Camillo Golgi (1843–1926), histologist noted for work on the structure of the nervous system and for his discovery of Golgi apparatus (1897)
- Giovanni Battista Grassi (1854–1925), zoologist who discovered that mosquitoes were responsible for transmitting malaria between humans
- Barnaba Oriani (1752–1832), astronomer, great scholar of orbital theories
- Filippo Pacini (1812–1883), anatomist who isolated the Vibrio cholerae (1854), the bacteria that causes cholera
- Antonio Pacinotti (1841–1912), physicist, inventor of the dynamo (1858) and electric motor (1858)
- Ferdinando Palasciano (1815–1891), physician and politician, considered one of the forerunners of the foundation of the Red Cross
- Luigi Palmieri (1807–1896), physicist and meteorologist, inventor of the mercury seismometer
- Galileo Ferraris (1847–1897), physicist and electrical engineer, noted for the discovery of the rotating magnetic field, basic working principle of the induction motor
- Macedonio Melloni (1798–1854), physicist, demonstrated that radiant heat has similar physical properties to those of light
- Giuseppe Mercalli (1850–1914), volcanologist and seismologist, inventor of the Mercalli intensity scale (1902)
- Quirico Filopanti (1812–1894), mathematician and politician; in his book Miranda! (1858), he was the first to propose universal time and worldwide standard time zones, 21 years before Sandford Fleming
- Carlo Forlanini (1847–1918), physician, inventor of artificial pneumothorax (1882) for treatment of pulmonary tuberculosis
- Giuseppe Zamboni (1776–1846), physicist who invented the Zamboni pile (1812); a model of dry battery
- Francesco Zantedeschi (1797–1873), physicist who published papers (1829, 1830) on the production of electric currents in closed circuits by the approach and withdrawal of a magnet
- Agostino Bassi (1773–1856), entomologist; first person to succeed in the experimental transmission of a contagious disease
- Giacomo Bresadola (1847–1929), clergyman and a prolific and influential mycologist
- Francesco Brioschi (1824–1897), mathematician, known for his contributions to the theory of algebraic equations and to the applications of mathematics to hydraulics
- Francesco Carlini (1783–1862), astronomer; worked in the field of celestial mechanics; improved the theory of the motion of the Moon
- Giovanni Caselli (1815–1891), physicist, inventor of the pantelegraph (1861)
- Orso Mario Corbino (1876–1937), physicist and politician, discovered modulation calorimetry and Corbino effect, a variant of the Hall effect
- Alfonso Giacomo Gaspare Corti (1822–1876), anatomist, known for his discoveries on the anatomical structure of the ear
- Domenico Cotugno (1736–1822), physician and anatomist; discovered albuminuria (about a half century before Richard Bright); one of the first scientists to identify urea in human urine, demonstrated the existence of the labyrinthine fluid
- Alessandro Cruto (1847–1908), inventor who improved on Thomas Alva Edison incandescent light bulb with carbon filament (1881)
- Giovanni Battista Morgagni (1682–1771), anatomist, called the founder of pathologic anatomy
- Angelo Mosso (1846–1910), physiologist who created the first crude neuroimaging technique
- Adelchi Negri (1876–1912), pathologist and microbiologist who identified what later became known as Negri bodies (1903) in the brains of animals and humans infected with the rabies virus
- Leopoldo Nobili (1784–1835), physicist, designed the first precision instrument for measuring electric current (1825)
- Raffaele Piria (1814–1865), chemist, first to successfully synthesize salicylic acid (1839); the active ingredient in aspirin
- Giovanni Antonio Amedeo Plana (1781–1864), astronomer and mathematician; founder of the Observatory of Turin
- Emanuele Paternò (1847–1935), chemist, discoverer of the Paternò–Büchi reaction (1909)
- Giuseppe Peano (1858–1932), mathematician and a founder of symbolic logic whose interests centred on the foundations of mathematics and on the development of a formal logical language
- Gaetano Perusini (1879–1915), physician, remembered for his contribution to the description of Alzheimer's
- Arturo Issel (1842–1922), geologist, palaeontologist, malacologist and archaeologist; noted for first defining the Tyrrhenian Stage (1914)
- Vilfredo Pareto (1848–1923), engineer, sociologist, economist, and philosopher, eponym of Pareto distribution, Pareto efficiency, Pareto index and Pareto principle
- Agostino Perini (1802–1878), naturalist
- Antonio Raimondi (1826–1890), geographer and scientist
- Paolo Ruffini (1765–1822), mathematician and physician who made studies of equations that anticipated the algebraic theory of groups
- Antonio Scarpa (1752–1832), anatomist, famous for the anatomical eponyms Scarpa triangle and Scarpa ganglion of the ear
- Giovanni Schiaparelli (1835–1910), astronomer and science historian who first observed lines on the surface of Mars, which he described as canals
- Angelo Secchi (1818–1878), astronomer; known for his work in spectroscopy; pioneer in classifying stars by their spectra
- Francesco Selmi (1817–1881), chemist, one of the founders of colloid chemistry
- Enrico Sertoli (1842–1910), physiologist and histologist; discovered the cells of the seminiferous tubules of the testis that bear his name (1865)
- Ascanio Sobrero (1812–1888), chemist, famous for having discovered the synthesis of nitroglycerine (1846)
- Agostino Bassi (1773–1856), entomologist, first person to succeed in the experimental transmission of a contagious disease
- Vincenzo Tiberio (1869–1915), physician and researcher; one of many scientists to notice the antibacterial power of some types of mold before Alexander Fleming's discovery of penicillin
- Gregorio Ricci-Curbastro (1853–1925), mathematician, inventor of tensor analysis collaborator with Tullio Levi-Civita
- Augusto Righi (1850–1920), physicist who played an important role in the development of electromagnetism
- Scipione Riva-Rocci (1863–1937), internist and pediatrician, inventor of the mercury sphygmomanometer
- Gian Domenico Romagnosi (1761–1835), philosopher, economist and jurist, famous for having discovered the same link between electricity and magnetism
- Giovanni Battista Venturi (1746–1822), physicist; discoverer and eponym of the Venturi effect
- Carlo Fornasini (1854–1931), micropalaeontologist who studied Foraminifera
- Francesco Siacci (1839–1907), mathematician and officer in the Italian army, eponym of the Siacci's theorem, best known for his contributions to the field of exterior ballistics

== 20th century ==
- Virginia Angiola Borrino (1880–1965), physician who was the first woman to serve as head of a University Pediatric Ward in Italy
- Franco Brezzi (born 1945 ), mathematician.
- Giovanni Giorgi (1871–1950), physicist and electrical engineer who proposed a system of measurement that laid the foundation for the modern International System of Units (SI)
- Giuseppina Aliverti (1894–1982), geophysicist remembered for developing the Aliverti-Lovera method of measuring the radioactivity of water
- Maria Piazza (1894–1976), Italian mineralogist and educator of Jewish children in Rome during World War II
- Edoardo Amaldi (1908–1989), cosmic-ray physicist, one of the founding fathers of European space research, led the founding of the CERN, the ESRO and later the European Space Agency (ESA)
- Silvano Arieti (1914–1981), psychiatrist and psychoanalyst long recognized as a leading authority on schizophrenia
- Roberto Assagioli (1888–1974), psychiatrist and psychologist; founder of the healing system known as psychosynthesis
- Franco Basaglia (1924–1980), psychiatrist, promoter of an important reform in the Italian mental health system, the "legge 180/78" (law number 180, year 1978)
- Carlo Perrier (1886–1948), mineralogist and chemist who along with Emilio Segrè did extensive research on the element technetium, the last gap in the periodic table and the first element produced artificially
- Fabio Badilini (born 1964), pioneer in noninvasive electrocardiography
- Chiara Nappi (born 1951), physicist who has made significant contributions to the field of particle physics and the search for dark matter
- Enrico Bombieri (born 1940), mathematician who was awarded the Fields Medal in 1974 for his work in number theory
- Claudio Bordignon (born 1950), biologist, performed the first procedure of gene therapy using stem cells as gene vectors (1992)
- Evangelina Bottero (1859–1950), teacher and populariser of science
- Giuseppe Brotzu (1895–1976), physician, famous for having discovered the cephalosporin (1948)
- Flaminio Giulio Brunelli (1936–2004), physician, biologist, a supporter of the humanistic clinical approach.
- Nicola Cabibbo (1935–2010), physicist who reconciled these strange-particle decays with the universality of weak interactions
- Federico Capasso (born 1949), physicist, one of the inventors of the quantum cascade laser (QCL) in 1994
- Mario Capecchi (born 1937), molecular geneticist, famous for having contribution to development of "knockout mice" (1989)
- Antonio Carini (1872–1950), physician and bacteriologist who discovered Pneumocystis carinii, which is responsible for recurrent pneumonia in patients with AIDS
- Ferdinando Castagnoli (1917–1988), archaeologist who discovered the Latin sanctuary at Lavinium.
- Luigi Luca Cavalli-Sforza (1922–2018), population geneticist, currently teaching since 1970 as emeritus professor at Stanford University; one of the most important geneticists of the 20th century
- Ugo Cerletti (1877–1963), neurologist, co-inventor with Lucio Bini, of the method of electroconvulsive therapy in psychiatry
- Leon Croizat (1894–1982), scholar and botanist who developed an orthogenetic synthesis of evolution of biological form over space, in time, which he called panbiogeography.
- Bruno de Finetti (1906–1985), probabilist, statistician and actuary, noted for the "operational subjective" conception of probability
- Annibale de Gasparis (1819–1892), astronomer, his first asteroid discovery was 10 Hygiea in 1849; between 1850 and 1865, he discovered eight more asteroids
- Corrado Giannantoni (born 1950), nuclear physicist
- Ennio De Giorgi (1928–1996), mathematician; brilliantly resolved the 19th Hilbert problem; today, this contribution is known as the De Giorgi–Nash Theorem
- Franco Rasetti (1901–2001), physicist, paleontologist and botanist, together with Enrico Fermi, discovered key processes leading to nuclear fission but refused to work on the Manhattan Project on moral grounds
- Henry Salvatori (1901–1997), geophysicist, founder of Western Geophysical, an international oil exploration company for the purpose of using reflection seismology to explore petroleum
- Maurizio Diana (1939), geologist
- Renato Dulbecco (1914–2012), virologist, known for his brilliant work with two viruses that can transform animal cells into a cancer-like state in the test tube
- Federigo Enriques (1871–1946), mathematician, known principally as the first to give a classification of algebraic surfaces in birational geometry
- Vittorio Erspamer (1909–1999), pharmacologist and chemist, famous for having discovered the serotonin (1935) and octopamine (1948)
- Enrico Fermi (1901–1954), physicist, constructed the world's first nuclear reactor (1942), initiated the Atomic Age; father of atom bomb
- Amarro Fiamberti (1894–1970), psychiatrist who first performed a transorbital lobotomy (by accessing the frontal lobe of the brain through the orbits) in 1937
- Guido Fubini (1879–1943), mathematician, eponym of Fubini's theorem in measure theory
- Agostino Gemelli (1878–1959), physician, psychologist, and priest, founder of a university and eponym of the Agostino Gemelli University Polyclinic
- Riccardo Giacconi (1931–2018), astrophysicist, called the father of X-ray astronomy
- Clelia Giacobini (1931–2010), microbiologist, a pioneer of microbiology applied to conservation-restoration
- Corrado Gini (1884–1965), statistician, demographer and sociologist, developer of Gini coefficient
- Nicola Guarino (born 1954), scientist, co-inventor with Chris Welty, of the OntoClean, the first methodology for formal ontological analysis
- Rita Levi-Montalcini (1909–2012), neurologist, discovered the nerve growth factor (NGF)
- Salvador Luria (1912–1991), microbiologist, shared a 1969 Nobel Prize for investigating the mechanism of viral infection in living cells
- Ettore Majorana (1906–1938), theoretical physicist, noted for the eponymous Majorana equation
- Bruno Pontecorvo (1913–1993), nuclear physicist, author of numerous studies in high energy physics, especially on neutrinos; the prestigious Pontecorvo Prize was instituted in his memory
- Massimo Marchiori, computer scientist who made major contributions to the development of the World Wide Web; creator of HyperSearch
- Guglielmo Marconi (1874–1937), physicist, credited as the inventor of radio, often called the father of wireless communication and technology (1896)
- Franco Modigliani (1918–2003), economist and educator who received the Nobel Prize for Economics in 1985 for his work on household savings and the dynamics of financial markets
- Maria Montessori (1870–1952), physician and educator; the innovative educational method that bears her name (1907) is now spread in 22,000 schools in at least 110 countries worldwide
- Giulio Natta (1903–1979), chemist, famous for having discovered isotactic polypropylene (1954) and polymers (1957)
- Giuseppe Occhialini (1907–1993), physicist, contributed to the discovery of the pion or pi-meson decay in 1947, with César Lattes and Cecil Frank Powell
- Pier Paolo Pandolfi (born 1963), geneticist, discovered the genes underlying acute promyelocytic leukaemia (APL)
- Giorgio Parisi (born 1948), theoretical physicist, called the father of the modern field of chaos theory
- Giulio Racah (1909–1965), Italian-Israeli mathematician and physicist; Acting President of the Hebrew University of Jerusalem
- Bruno Rossi (1905–1993), experimental physicist, an authority on cosmic rays
- Margherita Hack (1922–2013), astrophysicist and scientific disseminator; the asteroid 8558 Hack, discovered in 1995, was named in her honour
- Carlo Rovelli (born 1956), theoretical physicist and a founder of loop quantum gravity
- Carlo Rubbia (born 1934), physicist who in 1984 shared with Simon van der Meer the Nobel Prize for Physics for the discovery of the massive, short-lived subatomic W particle and Z particle
- Emilio Segrè (1905–1989), physicist, known for his discovery of the antiproton
- Nazareno Strampelli (1866–1942), geneticist and agronomist, whose innovative scientific work in wheat breeding 30 years earlier than Borlaug laid the foundations for the Green Revolution
- Amelia Tonon (1899–1961), silkworm entomologist in Padua
- Carlo Urbani (1956–2003), physician, discovered severe acute respiratory syndrome (SARS) in 1998
- Alessandro Vaciago (1931–1993), chemist and cultural ambassador
- Gabriele Veneziano (born 1942), theoretical physicist and a founder of string theory
- Emilio Veratti (1872–1967), anatomist who described the sarcoplasmic reticulum
- Vito Volterra (1860–1940), mathematician and physicist who strongly influenced the modern development of calculus
- Antonino Zichichi (born 1929), physicist who has worked in the field of nuclear physics
- Enzo Paoletti (1943–2018), Italian-American virologist who developed the technology to express foreign antigens in vaccinia
- Fabiola Gianotti (born 1960), experimental particle physicist, worked on several CERN experiments, including the one that discovered the Higgs boson, first woman ever Director-General at CERN

== 21st century ==
- Irene Tamborra, particle astrophysicist

== See also ==
- Science and technology in Italy
