= Ernesto Laura =

Italian mathematician

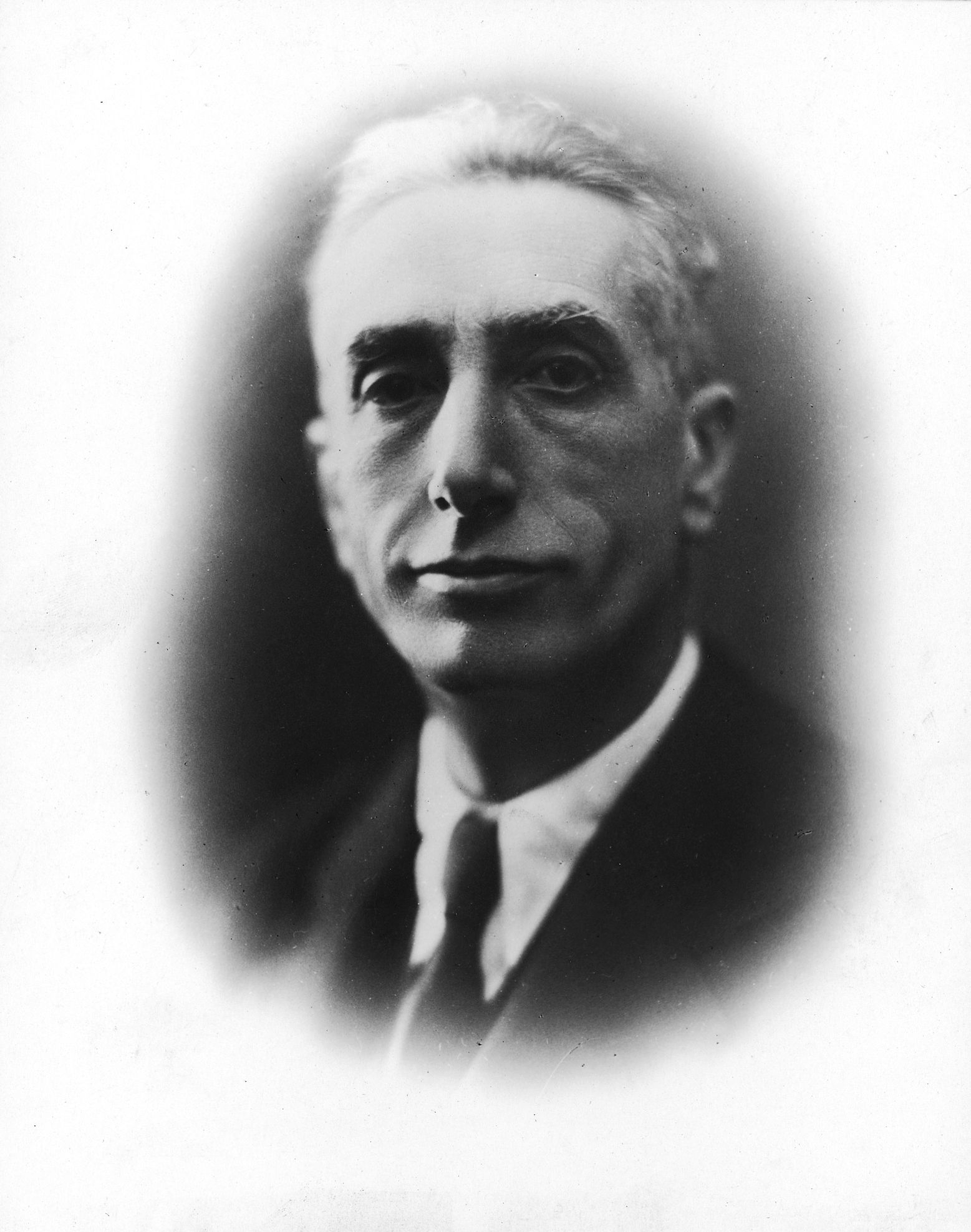
- Born: 23 March 1879; Porto Maurizio
- Died: 29 December 1949 (aged 60); Padua
- Education: University of Turin
- Scientific career
- Fields: Mathematics

Ernesto Laura (23 March 1879 – 29 December 1949) was an Italian mathematician born in Porto Maurizio.

== Biography ==
He graduated in mathematics in 1901 at the University of Turin, where he was a student of Morera and of Somigliana.

He taught rational mechanics at the Universities of Messina, Pavia and Padua.

Laura has dealt with uncommon elasticity problems, namely related to indefinitely extended elastic means and, especially in the last part of his University career, the mechanics of flexible and inextensible surfaces.
