= Perroncito =

Perroncito is an Italian surname. Notable people with the surname include:

- Aldo Perroncito (1882–1929), Italian pathologist, son of Edoardo
- Edoardo Perroncito (1847–1936), Italian parasitologist, father of Aldo
