= Ciucci =

Ciucci (pronounced [ˈtʃuttʃi]) is an Italian surname. Notable people with the surname include:

- Alfredo Ciucci (1920–?), Italian footballer
- Antonio Filippo Ciucci (died c. 1710), Italian physician
- Pietro Ciucci (born 1950), Italian businessman
