= Hemidactylus fragilis =

Conservation status
- Data Deficient (IUCN 3.1)

Scientific classification
- Kingdom: Animalia
- Phylum: Chordata
- Class: Reptilia
- Order: Squamata
- Suborder: Gekkota
- Family: Gekkonidae
- Genus: Hemidactylus
- Species: H. fragilis

Binomial name
- Hemidactylus fragilis Calabresi, 1915

Species of lizard

Hemidactylus fragilis is a species of gecko, a lizard in the family Gekkonidae. The species is endemic to the Horn of Africa.

== Geographic range ==
H. fragilis is found in Ethiopia and Somalia.

== Taxonomy ==
H. fragilis is sometimes considered conspecific with the common house gecko, H. frenatus. In fact, it had been synonymized with the species by Loveridge in 1947, but was resurrected by Mazuch et al. in 2016.

== Description ==
Small for its genus, H. fragilis may attain a snout-to-vent length (SVL) of 3.72 cm (1.46 in).

== Reproduction ==
H. fragilis is oviparous.
