= Hemidactylus puccionii =

Conservation status
- Data Deficient (IUCN 3.1)

Scientific classification
- Kingdom: Animalia
- Phylum: Chordata
- Class: Reptilia
- Order: Squamata
- Suborder: Gekkota
- Family: Gekkonidae
- Genus: Hemidactylus
- Species: H. puccionii

Binomial name
- Hemidactylus puccionii Calabresi, 1927

Species of lizard

Hemidactylus puccionii, also known commonly as the Somali plain gecko and the Zanzibar leaf-toed gecko, is a species of lizard in the family Gekkonidae. The species is endemic to Somalia.

== Etymology ==
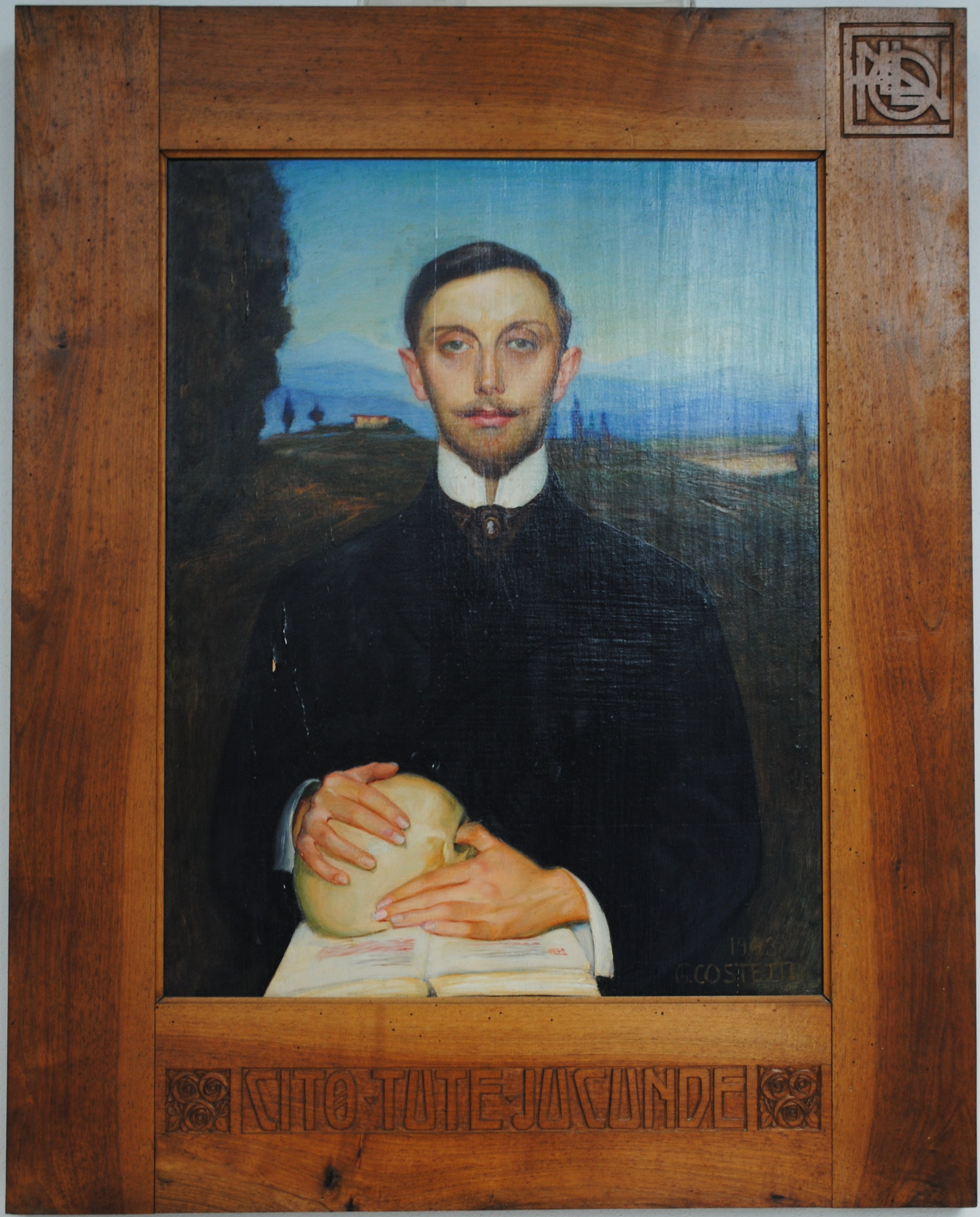
Portrait of Nello Puccioni, 1903 oil painting by Giovanni Costetti, frame by Adolfo De Carolis.

The specific name, puccionii, is in honor of Italian naturalist Nello Puccioni (1881–1937).

== Geographic range ==
H. puccionii is endemic to Somalia. Earlier records from Kenya and Zanzibar (Tanzania) refer to other species.

== Reproduction ==
H. puccionii is oviparous.
