= Giacinto Morera =

Italian engineer and mathematician (1856–1909)

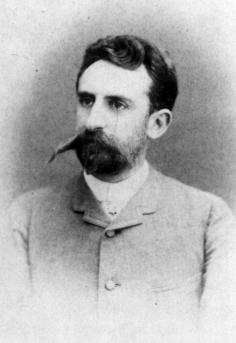
- Born: 18 July 1856; Novara, Kingdom of Sardinia
- Died: 8 February 1909 (aged 52); Turin, Kingdom of Italy
- Education: University of Turin: Engineering degree, 1878; Mathematics degree, 1879
- Known for: Morera's theorem; Morera stress functions
- Awards: Corresponding member of the Accademia Nazionale dei Lincei (1896); Resident member of the Accademia delle Scienze di Torino (1902); National member of the Accademia Nazionale dei Lincei (1907); Corresponding member of the Kharkov Mathematical Society (1909)
- Scientific career
- Fields: Complex analysis; Linear elasticity
- Workplaces: University of Genoa; Polytechnic University of Turin
- Academic advisors: Enrico D'Ovidio, Angelo Genocchi, Francesco Siacci

Giacinto Morera (18 July 1856 – 8 February 1909) was an Italian engineer and mathematician. He is known for Morera's theorem in the theory of functions of a complex variable and for his work in the theory of linear elasticity.

== Biography ==
=== Life ===
He was born in Novara on 18 July 1856, the son of Giacomo Morera and Vittoria Unico. According to Tricomi (1962), his family was a wealthy one, his father being a rich merchant. This occurrence eased him in his studies after the laurea: however, he was an extraordinarily hard worker and he widely used this ability in his researches. After studying in Turin he went to Pavia, Pisa and Leipzig: then he went back to Pavia for a brief period in 1885, and finally he went to Genoa in 1886, living here for the next 15 years. While in Genoa, he married his fellow-citizen Cesira Faà. From 1901 on to his death he worked in Turin: he died of pneumonia on 8 February 1909.

=== Education and academic career ===
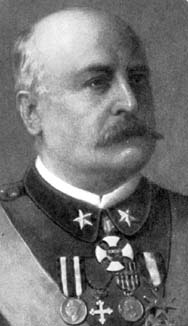
Francesco Siacci, who tutored Giacinto Morera in the early stage of his career

He earned in 1878 the laurea in engineering and then, in 1879, the laurea in mathematics, both awarded him from the Polytechnic University of Turin: According to Somigliana (1910a, p. 605), the title of his thesis in the mathematical sciences was: "Sul moto di un punto attratto da due centri fissi colla legge di Newton". In Turin he attended the courses held by Enrico D'Ovidio, Angelo Genocchi and particularly the ones held by Francesco Siacci: later in his life, Morera acknowledged Siacci as his mentor in scientific research and life. After graduating, he followed several advanced courses: he studied in Pavia from 1881 to 1882 under Eugenio Beltrami, Eugenio Bertini and Felice Casorati. In 1883 he was in Pisa under Enrico Betti, Riccardo de Paolis and Ulisse Dini: a year later, he was in Leipzig under Felix Klein, Adolph Mayer and Carl Neumann. In 1885 he went in Berlin in order to follow the lessons of Hermann von Helmholtz, Gustav Kirchhoff, Leopold Kronecker and Karl Weierstrass at the local university: later in the same year, he went back to Italy, briefly working at the University of Pavia as a professor in the then newly established "Scuola di Magistero". In 1886, after passing the required competitive examination by a judging commission, he became professor of rational mechanics at the University of Genoa: he lived there for 15 years, serving also as dean and as rector. In 1901 he was called by the University of Turin to hold the chair of rational mechanics, left vacant by Vito Volterra. In 1908 he passed to the chair of "Meccanica Superiore" and was elected dean of the Faculty of Sciences.

=== Honours ===
He was member of the Accademia Nazionale dei Lincei (first elected corresponding member on 18 July 1896, then elected national member on 26 August 1907) and of the Accademia delle Scienze di Torino (elected on 9 February 1902). Maggi (1910, p. 317) refers that also the Kharkov Mathematical Society elected him corresponding member during the meeting of the society held on 31 October 1909 (Old Calendar), being apparently not aware of his death.

=== Tracts of his personality and attitudes ===
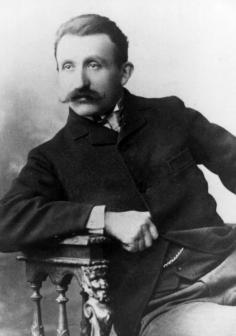
Carlo Somigliana, close friend and biographer of Giacinto Morera

In his commemorative papers, Carlo Somigliana describes extensively Morera's personality: according to him, he was a devoted friend and precious colleague, capable of serenely judging men and facts. On the very personal level, he remembers him as a cheerful person and a witty talker.

His intelligence is described as sharp and penetrating, his mind as uncommonly lucid, himself as possessing analytic and critical abilities and being versatile, capable to grasp and appreciate every kind of manifestation of the human intellect. Nevertheless, Somigliana also states that he was not interested in any scientific or other kind of field outside of his own realm of expertise. Morera (1889, p. 15) himself, in the inaugural address as the rector of the University of Genoa, after quoting a statement attributed to Peter Guthrie Tait, revealed the reason behind his views: "In science, the one who has a sound and solid knowledge, even in a narrow field, holds a true strength and he can use it whenever he needs: the one who has only a superficial knowledge, however wide and striking, holds nothing, and indeed he often holds a weakness pushing him towards vanity".

Acknowledged as honest, loyal and conscientious, good-tempered and with a good intellect, his simple manners earned him affection even when performing the duties of dean and rector at the University of Genoa. Also Maggi (1910, p. 319) describes him as a man of high moral value, and ascribes to such qualities the reason of his success in social relations and in performing his duties as a civil servant.

However, despite being successful in social relations, he did not care for, nor appreciate, appearances and was not interested in activities other than teaching and doing research: consequently, he was not well known outside the circle of his family and relatives and the circle of his colleagues. He did not make a display of himself, careless of not being acknowledged by everyone for his true value: he also had a serious conception of life and strongly disliked vanity and superficiality.

According to Somigliana, his entire life was devoted to the higher unselfish ideal of scientific research: and Maggi (1910, p. 319) also remarks that only his beloved family shared the same attentions and cares he reserved for his lifelong ideal.

== Work ==
=== Research activity ===
Una quantità di quistioni egli chiarì, semplificò o perfezionò, portando quasi sempre il contributo di vedute ingegnose ed originali. Talchè la sua produzione scientifica può dirsi critica nel senso più largo e fecondo, cioè non-dedicata allo studio di minuziosi particolari, ma alla penetrazione e soluzione delle quistioni più difficili e complicate. Questa tendenza del suo ingegno si rivelò anche in un carattere esteriore di molte sue pubblicazioni, che egli presentò in forma di lavori brevi e concettosi; dei quali poi particolarmente si compiaceva, ed in conformità del suo carattere sincero, la sua compiacenza non-si tratteneva dal manifestare apertamente.

— Carlo Somigliana, (Somigliana 1909, p. 192)

According to Somigliana, he was not particularly inventive: he did not create any new theory since this was not his main ability. Instead, he perfected already developed theories: nearly all of his researches appear as the natural result of a deep analysis work on theories that have already reached a high degree of perfection, clearly and precisely exposed. He had an exquisite sense for the applicability of his work, derived from his engineering studies, and mastered perfectly all known branches of mathematical analysis and their mechanical and physical applications.

He authored more than 60 research works: nearly complete lists of his publications are included in the commemorative papers (Somigliana 1910, pp. 581–583), (Somigliana 1910a, pp. 610–612) and (Maggi 1910, pp. 320–324). In particular, Maggi (1910, pp. 320–324) classifies Morera's work by assigning each publication to a particular research field: this classification is basically adopted in the following subsections.

==== Complex analysis ====
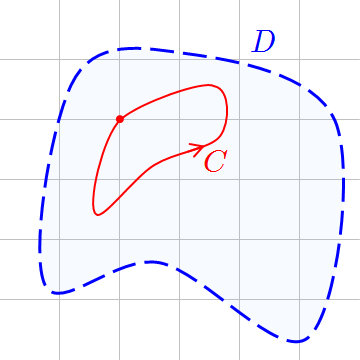
A curve C in a domain D, as required by the statement of Morera's theorem

Morera wrote eight research works on complex analysis: the style he used for their writing probably inspired Somigliana in the quotation introducing the "Research activity" section. Morera's theorem, probably the best known part of his scientific research, was first proved in the paper (Morera 1886b). The theorem states that if, in the complex plane $\mathbb{C}$, the line integral of a given continuous complex–valued function f satisfies the equation

$$\oint_C f(z)\,\mathrm{d}z = 0$$

for every closed curve C in a given domain D, then f is holomorphic there.

==== Differential equations ====
This section includes all his works on the theory of differential equations, ordinary or partial ones: Maggi (1910, p. 320) classifies this contributions as works in the theory of the equations of dynamics, in the theory of first-order partial differential equations and in the theory of exact differential equations. He wrote twelve papers on this topic: the results he obtained in these works are well described by Somigliana (1910, pp. 575–574). In the paper (Morera 1882a) he gives a very brief proof of a transformation formula for the Poisson brackets first proved by Émile Léonard Mathieu, while in the paper (Morera 1882b) he simplifies the proof of a theorem of Francesco Siacci which is substantially equivalent to Lie's third theorem: the paper (Morera 1883b) is concerned with the Pfaff problem, proving a theorem on the minimum number of integrations to be performed in order to solve the problem.

==== Equilibrium of continuous bodies in elasticity theory ====
Maggi (1910, p. 322) classifies four of his works within the realm of elasticity theory: his contribution are well described by Truesdell & Toupin (1960) and by Ericksen (1960) in their known monographs. The works within this section are perhaps the second-best-known part of his research, after his contributions to complex analysis.

==== Mathematical analysis ====
Maggi (1910, p. 322) classifies four of his works under the locution "Questioni varie di Analisi".

==== Potential theory of harmonic functions ====
His contribution of this topics are classified by Maggi (1910, pp. 321–322) under two sections, named respectively "Fondamenti della teoria della funzione potenziale" and "Attrazione dell'elissoide e funzioni armoniche ellissoidali". The work Morera (1906) deals with the definition and properties of ellipsoidal harmonics and the related Lamé functions.

==== Rational mechanics and mathematical physics ====
Maggi (1910, pp. 322) includes in this class twelve works: his first published work (Morera 1880) is included among them.

==== Varia: algebraic analysis and differential geometry ====
This section includes the only two papers of Morera on the subject of algebraic analysis and his unique paper on differential geometry: they are, respectively, the papers (Morera 1883a), (Morera 1886c) and (Morera 1886a).

=== Teaching activity ===
References (Somigliana 1910), (Somigliana 1910a) and (Maggi 1910) do not say much about the teaching activity of Giacinto Morera: Somigliana describes once his teaching ability as incisive. However, his teaching is also testified by the lithographed lecture notes (Morera 1903–1904): according to the OPAC, this book had two editions, the first one being in 1901–1902.

== Publications ==
- Morera, Giacinto (1880), "Sul moto di un punto attratto da due centri fissi colla legge di Newton" [On the motion of a point attracted by two fixed centres according to Newton's law], Giornale di Matematiche di Battaglini (in Italian), XVIII (3): 317–324, JFM 12.0676.01. Morera's first published paper, probably including material from his laurea thesis in mathematics.
- Morera, Giacinto (1882a), "Sopra una formola di Meccanica analitica" [On a formula in analytical mechanics], Rendiconti del Reale Instituto Lombardo di Scienze e Lettere, Serie II (in Italian), XV: 537–543, JFM 14.0749.01.
- Morera, Giacinto (1882b), "Il "Teorema fondamentale nella teoria delle equazioni canoniche del moto" del prof. Siacci" [The "Fundamental theorem in the theory of canonical equations of motion" of Prof. Siacci], Rendiconti del Reale Instituto Lombardo di Scienze e Lettere, Serie II (in Italian), XV: 640–645.
- Morera, Giacinto (11 March 1883a), "Sulle proprietà invariantive del sistema di una forma lineare e di una forma bilineare alternata" [On the invariant properties of the system composed of a linear form and of a bilinear alternating form], Atti della Reale Accademia delle Scienze di Torino (in Italian), XVIII: 267–286, JFM 15.0101.01. This paper was read by Enrico D'Ovidio at the meeting of the Class of Mathematical, Natural and Physical Sciences of the Accademia delle scienze di Torino, while Morera (1883a, p. 400) finished it on the February 1883 in Pisa, according to the date reported on the last page of the paper.
- Morera, Giacinto (29 April 1883b), "Sul problema di Pfaff" [On the Pfaff problem], Atti della Reale Accademia delle Scienze di Torino (in Italian), XVIII: 389–400, JFM 15.0313.02. This paper was read by Francesco Siacci at the meeting of the Class of Mathematical, Natural and Physical Sciences of the Accademia delle scienze di Torino, while Morera (1883b, p. 400) finished it on 15 April 1883 in Pisa, according to the date reported on the last page of the paper.
- Morera, Giacinto (1886a), "Sui sistemi di superficie e le loro traiettorie ortogonali" [On systems of surfaces and their orthogonal trajectories], Rendiconti del Reale Instituto Lombardo di Scienze e Lettere, Serie II (in Italian), XIX: 282–285, JFM 18.0720.01. Morera's unique paper in differential geometry.
- Morera, Giacinto (1886b), "Un teorema fondamentale nella teorica delle funzioni di una variabile complessa" [A fundamental theorem in the theory of functions of a complex variable], Rendiconti del Reale Instituto Lombardo di Scienze e Lettere, Serie II (in Italian), XIX (2): 304–307, JFM 18.0338.02: the paper containing the first proof of Morera's theorem.
- Morera, Giacinto (1886c), "Un piccolo contributo alla teoria delle forme quadratiche" [A little contribution to the theory of quadratic forms], Rendiconti del Reale Instituto Lombardo di Scienze e Lettere, Serie II (in Italian), XIX: 552–558, JFM 18.0157.01.
- Morera, Giacinto (1889), "Intorno all'integrale di Cauchy" [On the Cauchy integral], Rendiconti del Reale Instituto Lombardo di Scienze e Lettere, Serie II (in Italian), XXII (4): 191–200, JFM 21.0278.03 (requires DjVu plug-in): a paper containing the studies of Morera on the boundary values of the Cauchy integral.
- Morera, Giacinto (1889a), L'insegnamento delle scienze matematiche nelle Università Italiane [The teaching of mathematical sciences in Italian universities], Discorso inaugurale per l'anno accademico 1888–1889 della Reale Università di Genova (in Italian), Genoa: Pietro Martini, p. 29. The inaugural address pronounced on the occasion of the beginning of the academic year 1888–1889 at the University of Genoa, published in the form of a pamphlet.
- Morera, Giacinto (1896), "Dimostrazione di una formola di calcolo integrale" [Proof of an integral calculus formula], Revue de Mathématiques (in Italian), VI: 19–20, JFM 27.0228.02. A paper containing a short proof of Stokes' formula in the plane.
- Morera, Giacinto (1902), "Sulla definizione di funzione di una variabile complessa" [On the definition of functions of a complex variable], Atti della Reale Accademia delle Scienze di Torino (in Italian), 37: 99–102, JFM 33.0396.01.
- Morera, Giacinto (1903–1904) [1901–1902], Lezioni di Meccanica razionale [Lectures on rational mechanics] (in Italian) (2nd ed.), Turin: Litografia G. Paris, p. 515.
- Morera, Giacinto (25 February 1906), "Sulla attrazione degli strati ellissoidali e sulle funzioni armoniche ellissoidali" [On the attraction of elliptic layers and on ellipsoidal harmonic functions], Atti della Reale Accademia delle Scienze di Torino (in Italian), 41: 520–531 (Part I), 538–541 (Part II), JFM 37.0794.02. Part II was read at the meeting of the Class of Mathematical, Natural and Physical Sciences of the Accademia delle scienze di Torino held a few weeks later, on 11 March 1906: see here for a brief description of the meeting, and here to access part II of the paper directly.

== See also ==
- Potential theory

== Sources ==
=== Biographical references ===
The references listed in this section contain mainly biographical information on the life of Giacinto Morera.

- Accademia Nazionale dei Lincei (2012), Annuario dell'Accademia Nazionale dei Lincei 2012 – CDX dalla Sua Fondazione (PDF) (in Italian), Roma: Accademia Nazionale dei Lincei, p. 734, archived from the original (PDF) on 4 March 2016. The "Yearbook" of the renowned Italian scientific institution, including a historical sketch of its history, the list of all past and present members, as well as a wealth of information about its academic and scientific activities.
- Cossa, Alfonso; et al. (9 February 1902), "Adunanza del 9 febbraio 1902. Classe di Scienze fisiche matematiche e naturali" [Meeting of 9 February 1902. Class of physical, mathematical and natural Sciences], Atti della Reale Accademia delle Scienze di Torino (in Italian), 37: 251–252.
- Tricomi, G. F. (1962), "Giacinto Morera", Matematici italiani del primo secolo dello stato unitario [Italian mathematicians of the first century of the unitary state], Memorie dell'Accademia delle Scienze di Torino. Classe di Scienze fisiche matematiche e naturali. Serie IV (in Italian), vol. I, p. 120, Zbl 0132.24405, archived from the original on 4 March 2016. A collection of biographical notes on Italian mathematicians who worked in Italy from 1861 up to 1960. Its content is available from the website of the Società Italiana di Storia delle Matematiche.

=== General references ===
The references listed in this section are mainly commemorations or surveys giving information on the life or Morera but also describing his scientific researches in some detail.

- Fichera, Gaetano (1979), "Il contributo italiano alla teoria matematica dell'elasticità" [the Italian contribution to the mathematical theory of elasticity], Rendiconti del Circolo Matematico di Palermo, Serie II (in Italian), XXVIII (1): 5–26, doi:10.1007/BF02849579, MR 0564544, S2CID 122003599, Zbl 0433.73002. "The Italian contribution to the mathematical theory of elasticity" is a survey paper describing the Italian contributions to the field of elasticity, including brief sketches of the biographies of the main scientists involved.
- Maggi, Gian Antonio (1910), "Giacinto Morera", Giornale di Matematiche di Battaglini (in Italian), 48 (3): 317–324, Bibcode:1909NCim...17..191S, doi:10.1007/BF02709438, JFM 41.0023.06, S2CID 186242236. This paper is the Italian translation by the author of an original commemorative paper written in Russian, published in the "Communications de la Societé Mathématique de Kharkoff" as Маджи, Г. А. (1910), Гiацинтъ Mopepa (Некрологъ), Сообщенія Харьковскаго Математическаго Общества, Вторая серiя, 11 (2): 243–248
- Somigliana, Carlo (December 1909), "Giacinto Morera", Il Nuovo Cimento, Serie V (in Italian), 17 (1): 191–194, Bibcode:1909NCim...17..191S, doi:10.1007/BF02709438, JFM 40.0038.03, S2CID 186242236.
- Somigliana, Carlo (24 April 1910), "Giacinto Morera", Atti della Reale Accademia delle Scienze di Torino (in Italian), 45 (1): 573–583, Bibcode:1909NCim...17..191S, doi:10.1007/BF02709438, JFM 41.0023.04, S2CID 186242236.
- Somigliana, Carlo (1910a), "Commemorazione del Socio nazionale prof. Giacinto Morera", Rendiconti della Reale Accademia dei Lincei, Classe di Scienze Fisiche, Matematiche, Naturali, Serie V (in Italian), 19 (1): 604–612, JFM 41.0023.05.

=== Scientific references ===
The references listed in this section describe particular aspect of Morera's scientific work or survey his scientific contribution to a given field.

- Burckel, Robert B. (1979), An Introduction to Classical Complex Analysis. Vol. 1, Lehrbücher und Monographien aus dem Gebiete der exakten Wissenschaften. Mathematische Reihe, vol. Band 64, Basel–Stuttgart: Birkhäuser Verlag, p. 570, ISBN 3-7643-0989-X, MR 0555733, Zbl 0434.30001.
- Gurtin, Morton E. (1983) [1972], "The Linear Theory of elasticity", in Flügge, Siegfried; Truesdell, Clifford A. (eds.), Festkörpermechanik/Mechanics of Solids, Handbuch der Physik (Encyclopedia of Physics), vol. VIa/2, Berlin–Heidelberg–New York: Springer-Verlag, pp. 1–295, ISBN 3-540-13161-2 ISBN 0-387-13161-2.
- Ericksen, J. L. (1960), "Tensor Fields (Appendix to "The Classical Field Theories")", in Flügge, Siegfried (ed.), Principles of Classical Mechanics and Field Theory/Prinzipien der Klassischen Mechanik und Feldtheorie, Handbuch der Physik (Encyclopedia of Physics), vol. III/1, Berlin–Heidelberg–New York: Springer-Verlag, pp. 794–858, Bibcode:1960HDP.....2.....F, doi:10.1007/978-3-642-45943-6, ISBN 978-3-540-02547-4, MR 0118005, Zbl 0118.39702.
- Muskhelishvili, N. I. (1992) [1949], Singular integral equations. Boundary problems of function theory and their application to mathematical physics, Mineola: Dover Publications, pp. vi+447, ISBN 0-486-66893-2, MR 0058845, Zbl 0051.33203 (reviews of the first 1953 English edition).
- Truesdell, C.; Toupin, R.A. (1960), "The Classical Field Theories", in Flügge, Siegfried (ed.), Principles of Classical Mechanics and Field Theory/Prinzipien der Klassischen Mechanik und Feldtheorie, Handbuch der Physik (Encyclopedia of Physics), vol. III/1, Berlin–Heidelberg–New York: Springer-Verlag, pp. 226–793, Bibcode:1960HDP.....2.....F, doi:10.1007/978-3-642-45943-6, ISBN 978-3-540-02547-4, MR 0118005, Zbl 0118.39702.
