= Nicola Guarino =

Italian computer scientist

Nicola Guarino (born 1954, in Messina) is an Italian computer scientist and researcher in the area of Formal Ontology for Information Systems, and the head of the Laboratory for Applied Ontology (LOA), part of the Italian National Research Council (CNR) in Trento.

== Work ==
Guarino's research interests are in the area of Artificial Intelligence, predominantly in Knowledge Representation. He may be best known in the Computer Science community for developing OntoClean, the first methodology for formal ontological analysis, with his colleague Chris Welty.

=== Knowledge Representation ===
He is arguably one of the founders of the field of ontology in computer science, but undoubtedly one of its most outspoken proponents. While most of the AI and KR researchers focused on reasoning algorithms and semantics of representation languages, and considered the actual knowledge expressed in these languages and reasoned over by these algorithms to be unimportant (just examples), Guarino spearheaded a counter-movement to study how knowledge should be expressed. The rallying cry of this movement undoubted came from the well-known "Naive Physics Manifesto" paper by Patrick J. Hayes.

=== Knowledge-based systems ===
Guarino's work in the early 1990s began to take shape as he applied his engineering background to understand how knowledge-based systems were built and, most importantly, how the knowledge was acquired. He was a familiar face in the early Knowledge Acquisition Workshops where he was best known for pointing to himself and saying, "I am not a class!" This remark referred to what Guarino believes to be an important and fundamental distinction between universals and particulars. While some representation systems allow classes to themselves be instances of other classes, and in certain contexts that makes sense, there are some instances which can never be classes (these are particulars).

=== Formal Ontology in Information Systems conference ===
His emphasis on formal rigor in specifying the type of knowledge that was eventually to be called "ontologies" by computer scientists, led him to the field of formal ontology in philosophy, where he began to study the metaphysics literature, focusing on the work of such notables as Quine, Strawson, and especially Simons.

Guarino founded the Formal Ontology in Information Systems conference in 1998, a recurring academic conference focused on ontologies themselves, not the languages they are represented in. He has worked tirelessly to promote research in ontology and maintain a level of scientific rigor.
