= Emilio Veratti =

Italian anatomist and pathologist

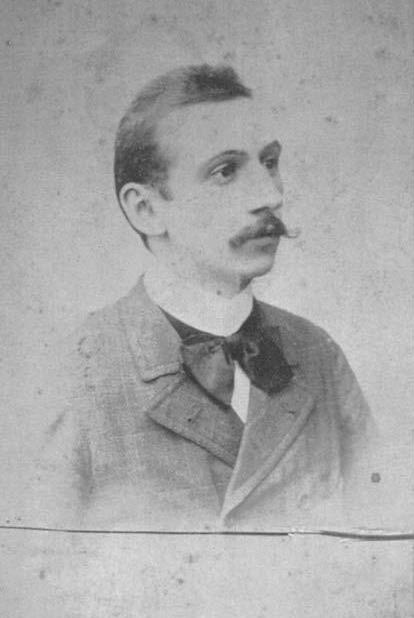
Emilio Veratti (1872-1967)

Emilio Veratti (24 March 1872, Varese – 24 February 1967) was an Italian anatomist and pathologist. He is known for his discovery of the sarcoplasmic reticulum.

He studied medicine at the Universities of Pavia and Bologna, where he received his doctorate in 1896. Following graduation he worked for Camillo Golgi (1843-1926) at the Institute of General Pathology in Pavia. Here he distinguished himself by way of research in the fields of histology and microbiology. Eventually he attained the title of "libero docente" (equivalent of privat-docent) in histology and general pathology.

In 1921 he established a bacteriology laboratory in the medical clinic at Pavia. In 1930 he was successor to Aldo Perroncito (1882-1929) as professor of general pathology, a position he kept until his retirement in 1942.

In March 1902, he provided the first accurate description of the reticular network (sarcoplasmic reticulum) in skeletal muscle fibers. His published findings attracted little attention at the time, and as years passed by, his discovery was all but forgotten. In 1961 "Veratti's reticulum" was re-discovered through the use of electron microscopy.

== Associated publications ==
- Veratti E., 1902. Ricerche sulla fine struttura della fibra muscolare striata. Mem. R. Ist. Lombardo, Cl. Sc. Mat. Nat., 19: 87-133.
- Veratti E., 1961. "Investigations on the fine structure of striated muscle fiber". J. Biophys. Biochem. Cytol., 10 (4) Suppl.: 3-59 (Translated from the Italian by C. Bruni, H.S. Bennett and D. de Koven).
