= Agostino Perini =

Italian naturalist

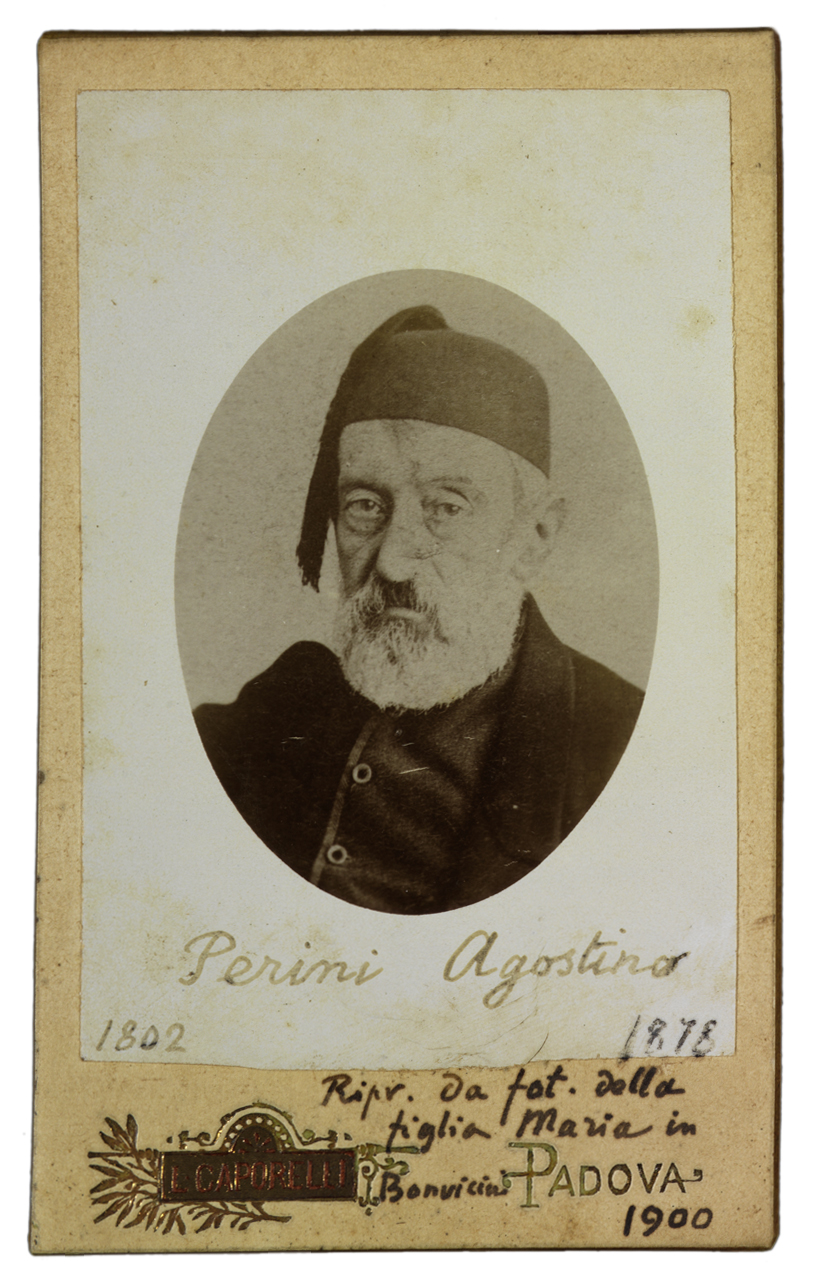
Image of Agostino Perini

Agostino Perini (born 2 December 1802 in Trento; died 19 October 1878 in Padua) was an Italian naturalist.
