= Amelia Tonon =

Italian entomologist

- Born: 23 March 1899; Trieste (now Italy)
- Died: 21 August 1961 (aged 62); Padua, Italy
- Education: University of Padua
- Occupation: Entomologist
- Known for: Research into silkworms and crossbreeding

Amelia Tonon (1899–1961) was an Italian entomologist who researched silkworms, their eggs and crossbreeding them. She also patented a technique to stain embryos.

== Life and work ==
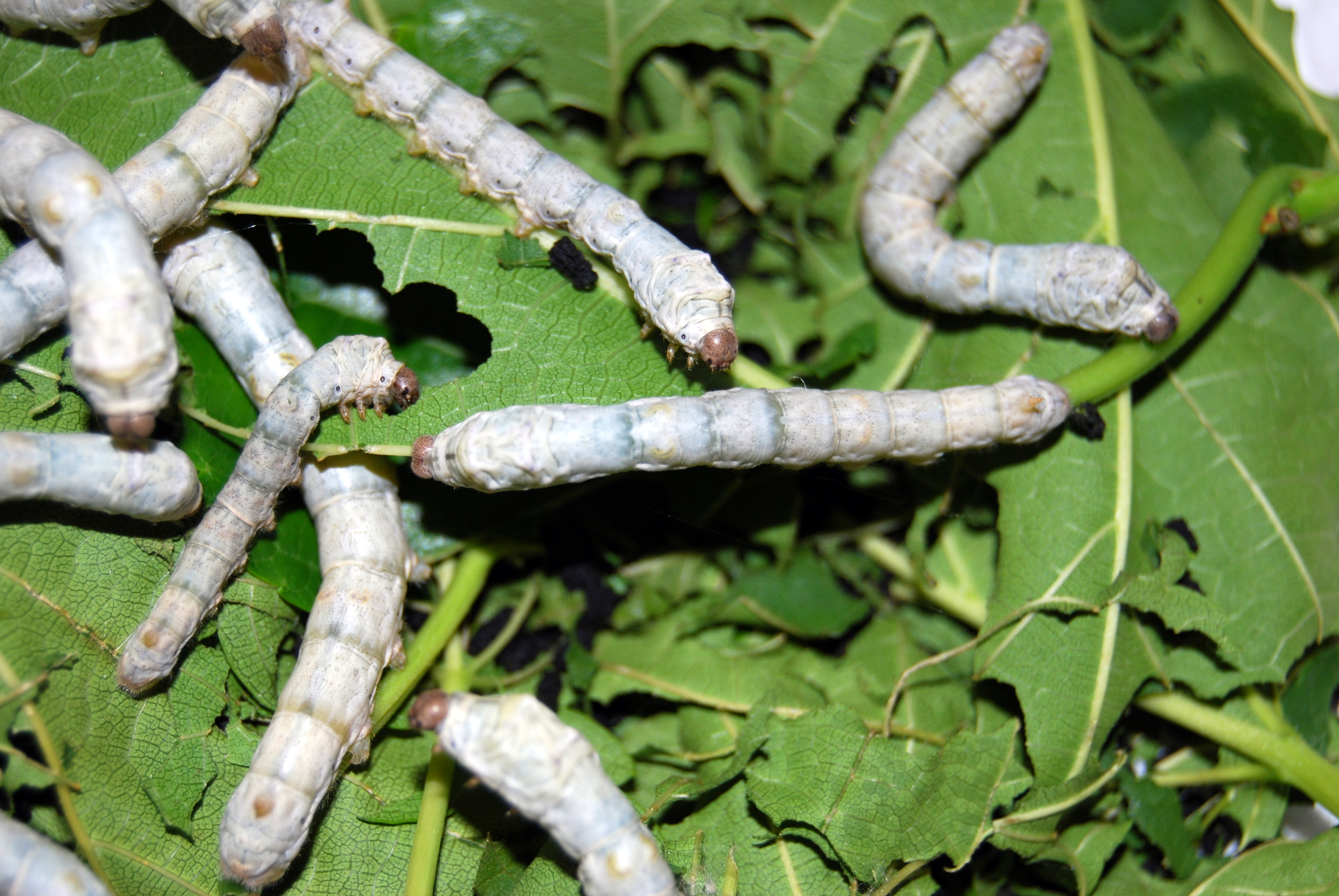
Silkworms

Amelia Tonon was born in Trieste on 23 March 1899 (Trieste is now part of Italy, but at the time, the city was part of the Habsburg monarchy). As a teenager, she moved to Padua, Italy, where she graduated from the University of Padua in natural sciences.

In 1923, she worked in a temporary assignment as a researcher at the Experimental Zoological Station of the University of Padua. The next July she competed for a permanent version of her position and won. Later she also earned her license adding teaching credentials to her skill set.

In 1928, she spent three weeks as a visiting researcher at the Naples Zoological Station.

Except for her time in Naples, Tonon worked exclusively at the Zoological Station of Padua. There, she performed experiments specializing in the conservation and treatment of silkworm eggs. More specifically, she analyzed the evolution and physiology of vitelline cells in relation to their activities; she dealt with embryonic anomalies in the stages of development; she focused on the phenomenon of albinism and its relations in larval life.

She received a patent for her new method of staining embryos. When other researchers began using Tonon's technique, they could more easily monitor the development of an embryo.

In addition to the embryos, Tonon was also interested in silkworm eggs and their reaction to exposure to ultraviolet rays and steam tar. Her final research endeavors concerned the possible crossings of different breeds of silkworms: she also achieved good results by selecting valuable breeds. She also studied the structure of mulberry buds.

She died in 1960 or 1961 on 21 August, in Padua.

== Selected works ==
- Tonon, A. (1925) (with G. Teodoro) Tecnica per lo studio microscopico del Bombyx mori, (Technique for the microscopic study of Bombyx mori) «Bollettino di Sericoltura», A. XXXII, n. 9. Anomalie embrionali nei lepidotteri Bombyx mori, «Atti e memorie della Regia Accademia di Scienze, Lettere e Arti di Padova», 1924, vol. L.
- Tonon, A. (1926). Variabilità dei caratteri embriologici nell'uovo di Filugello durante la diapausa. (Variability of embryological characters in the Silkworm egg during diapause). Grafiche Carlo Ferrari.
