= Francesco Siacci =

Italian mathematician (1839–1907)

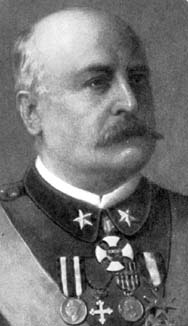
- Born: 20 April 1839; Rome, Papal States (now Italy)
- Died: 31 May 1907 (aged 68); Naples, Italy
- Citizenship: Italian
- Education: University of Rome (1860)
- Known for: Siacci's method, Siacci's theorem
- Scientific career
- Fields: Mechanics, Exterior Ballistics.
- Workplaces: University of Turin, University of Naples
- Notable students: Giacinto Morera

Francesco Siacci (20 April 1839 – 31 May 1907), an Italian mathematician, ballistician, and officer in the Italian army, was born in Rome, Italy. He was a professor of mechanics in the University of Turin and University of Naples. He is best known for his contributions to the field of exterior ballistics.

== Biography ==
Siacci graduated from the University of Rome in 1860 and received an honorary degree in mathematics. In 1861, he moved to Turin and enlisted in the army amidst the period of Italian unification. He also became a professor of mechanics at the Military Academy. He remained there until war broke out in Italy in 1866.

Siacci was briefly part of the campaign against the Austrians in a war in 1866, until he was sent back to Turin to teach ballistics at the Military Academy. In 1871, he began teaching mechanics in the University of Turin. A year later, he was promoted to Professor of Ballistics at the School of Applied Artillery and Engineering in Turin and held that post until his retirement from the army as a major general in 1892. In 1875, he became a Professor of Higher Mechanics in the University of Turin.

After two terms as a deputy in 1892, Siacci was appointed as a senator in Rome in 1893. Since Turin is far from Rome, he requested a transfer to the University of Naples to capably serve as senator and still teach. Consequently, Vito Volterra took over his vacated position in Turin, but Siacci retained an honorary professorship there. Siacci stayed to teach in Naples for the rest of his life.

Siacci was a member of the most important national academies in Italy, including the Accademia dei Lincei (corresponding member in 1872, full member in 1890), the Accademia Nazionale delle Scienze detta dei XL, the Accademia delle Scienze in Turin, and the Accademia delle Scienze Fisiche e Matematiche in Naples.

A street in Rome, the Via Francesco Siacci, is named after him.

== Exterior ballistics ==
Siacci is well known for his contributions in the field of ballistics, distinguishing himself with a famous treatise Balistica, published in 1888 and translated to French in 1891. Of great importance is an approximation method he devised to calculate bullet trajectories of small departure angles. Known as Siacci's method, it was a major innovation in exterior ballistics and was widely used almost exclusively at the beginning of World War I. Several modifications of the method are still in use today, including those of H.P. Hitchcock and R.H. Kent, and James Ingalls. Siacci also studied theoretical mechanics (Siacci's theorem, rigid body dynamics, canonical transformations, and inverse problems) and mathematics (theory of conic sections, Riccati differential equation, etc.).

== Siacci's theorem ==
Siacci's theorem in dynamics is the resolution of the acceleration vector of a particle into radial and tangential components, which are generally not perpendicular to one another. Siacci formulated this decomposition in two papers which were published in 1879, the first for planar motions, and the second for spatial motions. The theorem is useful in situations where angular momentum is constant (for example, in central forces).
