= Fabio Badilini =

Italian scientist and business man

- Born: Fabio Francesco Badilini; 22 October 1964 (age 61); Montichiari, Brescia, Italy

Fabio Badilini (born 22 October 1964 in Montichiari, Brescia) is an Italian scientist and businessman. He has made contributions to noninvasive electrocardiography.

== Early life and education ==
Badilini received a master's degree in biomedical engineering at the Polytechnic University of Milan, Italy, in 1989 under Sergio Cerutti. There he focused on aspects of heart rate variability that led to the development of computer applications that are today widely employed in the field of central nervous system analysis. He received his Ph.D. in electrical engineering from the University of Rochester in 1994 under Arthur J. Moss. His thesis was on beat-to-beat ST segment displacement assessment in Holter recordings. His major innovations related to ST segment variability analyses have given new impetus to improved quantitative analysis of noninvasive electrocardiographic recordings. His techniques and approaches are widely used. While working as a post-doctoral fellow with Philippe Coumel at Lariboisiere Hospital in Paris from 1994 to 1998, Badilini was instrumental in the development of the Holter Bin Method for assessing the effect of heart rate upon the QT interval that has been used in New Drug Applications to the FDA.

== Career ==
=== 1990s ===
In 1998, he led the working team that defined the International Society of Holter and Non-Invasive Electrocardiology (ISHNE) ECG format from ambulatory ECG recordings. Notably, he was the lead technical contributor in the creation of data standards for digital ECGs submitted to the FDA ECG Warehouse used for the safety evaluation of new drugs. Badilini also developed the first ECG computer application used by the FDA to review digital ECG files on the ECG recordings electronically submitted with the new standard. Nearly every provider of ECG safety data in the drug approval process worldwide uses his tools. In addition to these contributions on standard ECG signal processing, he has developed tools to extract optimal ECG waveforms from 12-lead Holter data based upon recording artifact and heart rate stability for QT measurement.

=== 2000s ===
Since 1998, he has worked in the pharmaceutical industry arena, and he is the founder and executive vice president of AMPS-LLC, NY, a company tailoring software-oriented solutions involving analysis of biomedical signals. He maintains a series of worldwide academic collaborations with leaders in many aspects of cardiovascular signal processing.

== Honors and awards ==
- 2 October 2003 - FDA Commissioner Special citation, for “Development of a format for regulatory submission of annotated electrocardiographic waveform data to meet FDA’s needs in assessing the proarrhythmic potentials of drugs.
- 30 March 2009 - American College of Cardiology Honorary Fellowship Award 2009 in recognition of his contributions to the field of non-invasive electrocardiology

== Published work ==
- Badilini, Fabio; Vaglio, M; Sarapa, N (2009). "Automatic Extraction of ECG Strips from Continuous 12-lead Holter Recordings for QT Analysis at Prescheduled versus Optimized Time Points". Annals of Noninvasive Electrocardiology. 14 (Suppl 1): S22–S29. CiteSeerX 10.1.1.658.5278. doi:10.1111/j.1542-474X.2008.00260.x. PMC 6932623. PMID 19143738.
- Badilini, Fabio; Vaglio, M; Dubois, R; Roussel, P; Sarapa, N; Denjoy, I; Extramiana, F; Maison-Blanche, P (2008). "Automatic analysis of cardiac repolarization morphology using Gaussian mesa function modeling". J Electrocardiol. 41 (6): 588–594. doi:10.1016/j.jelectrocard.2008.07.020. PMID 18954609.
- Serapa, Nenad; F. Badilini (2008). "Quantitative Performance of E-Scribe Warehouse in Detecting Quality Issues with Digital Annotated ECG Data From Healthy Subjects". J Clin Pharmacol. 48 (5): 538–546. doi:10.1177/0091270008316326. PMID 18353997.
- Fossa, Anthony; F. Badilini (2007). "Analyses of Dynamic Beat-to-Beat QT–TQ Interval (ECG Restitution) Changes in Humans under Normal Sinus Rhythm and Prior to an Event of Torsades de Pointes during QT Prolongation Caused by Sotalol". Annals of Noninvasive Electrocardiology. 12 (4): 338–348. CiteSeerX 10.1.1.666.7703. doi:10.1111/j.1542-474X.2007.00183.x. PMC 6932286. PMID 17970959.
- Extramiana, Fabrice; F. Badilini (2007). "Contrasting Time and Rate based approaches for the assessment of drug-induced QT changes". J Clin Pharmacol. 47 (9): 1129–1137. doi:10.1177/0091270007302953. PMID 17656619.
- Extramiana, Fabrice; F. Badilini (2006). "Quantitative assessment of ST segment elevation in Brugada patients". Heart Rhythm. 3 (10): 1175––1181. doi:10.1016/j.hrthm.2006.06.010. PMID 17018347.
- Extramiana, Fabrice; F. Badilini (2006). "Control of Rapid Heart Rate Changes for Electrocardiographic Analysis: Implications for Thorough QT Studies". Clin Cardiol. 29 (12): 534––539. doi:10.1002/clc.20. PMC 6654636. PMID 17190179.
- Badilini, Fabio; Sarapa, N (2006). "Implications of methodological differences in digital electrocardiogram interval measurement". J Electrocardiol. 39 (4 Suppl): S152–S156. doi:10.1016/j.jelectrocard.2006.05.030. PMID 16920141.
- Extramiana, Fabrice; Fabio Badilini (2005). "Individual QT–R-R Relationship: Average Stability over Time Does Not Rule Out an Individual Residual Variability: Implication for the Assessment of Drug Effect on the QT Interval". Annals of Noninvasive Electrocardiology. 10 (2): 169––178. doi:10.1111/j.1542-474X.2005.05615.x. PMC 6932095. PMID 15842429.
- Badilini, Fabio (1998). "The ISHNE Holter Standard Output File Format". Annals of Noninvasive Electrocardiology. 3 (3): 263–266. doi:10.1111/j.1542-474x.1998.tb00353.x.
- Badilini, Fabio (2005). "HeartScope: a Software Tool Addressing Autonomic Nervous System Regulation". CinC. 32: 259–262.
- Chemla, Denis; Fabio Badilini (2005). "Comparison of fast Fourier transform and autoregressive spectral analysis for the study of heart rate variability in diabetic patients". Int J Cardiol. 104 (3): 307––313. doi:10.1016/j.ijcard.2004.12.018. PMID 16186061.
- Badilini, Fabio; Erdem, T; Zareba, W; Moss, AJ (2005). "ECGScan: a method for conversion of paper electrocardiographic printouts to digital electrocardiographic files". J Electrocardiol. 38 (4): 310––318. doi:10.1016/j.jelectrocard.2005.04.003. PMID 16216602.
- Extramiana, Fabrice; Fabio Badilini (2005). "Heart Rate Influences on Repolarization Duration and Morphology in Symptomatic Versus Asymptomatic KCNQ1 Mutation Carriers". Am J Cardiol. 95 (3): 406––409. doi:10.1016/j.amjcard.2004.09.045. PMID 15670556.
- Milliez, P; Fabio Badilini (2005). "Usefulness of Ventricular Repolarization Dynamicity in Predicting Arrhythmic Deaths in Patients With Ischemic Cardiomyopathy (from the European Myocardial Infarct Amiodarone Trial)". Am J Cardiol. 95 (7): 821––826. doi:10.1016/j.amjcard.2004.11.047. PMID 15781008.
- Badilini, Fabio; Maison-Blanche, P; Childers, R; Coumel, P (1999). "QT interval analysis on ambulatory electrocardiogram recordings: a selective beat averaging approach". Med Biol Eng Comput. 37 (1): 71–79. doi:10.1007/BF02513269. PMID 10396845.
- Extramiana, Fabrice; Fabio Badilini (1999). "Circadian Modulation of QT Rate Dependence in Healthy Volunteers". J Electrocardiol. 32 (1): 33––43. doi:10.1016/S0022-0736(99)90019-5. PMID 10037087.
- Badilini, Fabio (1998). "The ISHNE Holter Standard Output File Format". Annals of Noninvasive Electrocardiology. 3 (3): 263–266. doi:10.1111/j.1542-474x.1998.tb00353.x.
- Badilini, Fabio (1997). "Quantitative Aspects of Ventricular Repolarization: Relationship Between Three-Dimensional T Wawe Loop Morphology and Scalar QT Dispersion". Annals of Noninvasive Electrocardiology. 2 (2): 146–157. doi:10.1111/j.1542-474x.1997.tb00322.x.
