= Irene Tamborra =

Italian particle astrophysicist

- Born: Irene Tamborra
- Education: University of Bari
- Awards: EliteForsk Prize (2024); European Research Council Award (2022); Kvinder i Fisik Prize (2020); Shakti P. Duggal Award, International Union of Pure and Applied Physics (2019); MERAC Prize, European Astronomical Society (2019); Distinguished Associate Professor, Carlsberg Foundation (2019); Alexander von Humboldt Foundation Fellow (2011); Stanghellini Award, Italian Physical Society (2009)
- Scientific career
- Fields: Astrophysics; physics
- Institutions: Niels Bohr Institute, University of Copenhagen
- Website: www.irenetamborra.com

Irene Tamborra is an Italian particle astrophysicist, specializing in the areas of neutrino astrophysics and cosmology as well as multi-messenger astronomy. She is professor of particle astrophysics at the Niels Bohr Institute, University of Copenhagen.

== Education and career ==
Irene Tamborra studied physics at the University of Bari in Italy, earning a Bachelor's of Science in physics in 2005 and a Master of Science in theoretical physics in 2007. She graduated from the University of Bari in 2011 with a Ph.D. thesis in astroparticle physics. She was an Alexander von Humboldt Foundation research fellow at the Max Planck Institute for Physics in Munich from 2011 to 2013, and research associate at the GRAPPA Centre of Excellence of the University of Amsterdam from 2013 to 2015. She joined the Niels Bohr Institute as Knud Højgaard's assistant professor in 2016, and was then promoted to associate professor in 2017 and to full professor in 2021. Since 2017, she has been a Mercator Fellow at the Max Planck Institute for Physics and Max Planck Institute for Astrophysics.

== Research ==
Irene Tamborra’s research is at the interface between astrophysics and particle physics. She has proposed a number of ideas concerning the exploration of astrophysical objects using neutrinos, photons, and gravitational waves. Irene Tamborra's work connects the physics happening on microscopic scales in astrophysical sources to multi-messenger observations. Irene Tamborra has also provided fundamental contributions to scientists' understanding of neutrino flavor conversion in dense media (such as core-collapse supernovae, neutron star merger, and the early universe), physics beyond the Standard Model in astrophysical sources, and the nucleosynthesis of the heavy elements. She discovered the lepton emission self-sustained asymmetry (LESA). LESA is the first hydrodynamical instability occurring in core-collapse supernovae completely driven by neutrinos, and it consists of an astonishingly large asymmetric emission of electron neutrinos with respect to electron antineutrinos.

== Awards ==
- 2024: EliteForsk Prize, Ministry of Higher Education and Science (Denmark)
- 2022: ERC Consolidator Award, European Research Council
- 2020: Kvinder i Fisik Prize, Danish Network for Women in Physics
- 2019: Shakti P. Duggal Award, International Union of Pure and Applied Physics
- 2019: Merac Prize for the Best Early Career Researcher, European Astronomical Society
- 2019: Carlsberg Distinguished Associate Professor, Carlsberg Foundation
- 2011: Von Humboldt Fellow, Alexander von Humboldt Foundation
- 2009: Antonio Stanghellini Award, Italian Physical Society
