= Alfredo Ciucci =

Italian footballer (1920–?)

Personal information
- Date of birth: 17 October 1920
- Place of birth: Lucca, Kingdom of Italy
- Position: Midfielder

Senior career*
| Years | Team | Apps | (Gls) |
| 1946–1947 | Roma | 1 | (0) |
| 1948–1951 | Ternana | 81 | (20) |
- * Club domestic league appearances and goals

Alfredo Ciucci (17 October 1920 – ?) was an Italian professional football player. He played one game in the Serie A in the 1946/47 season for A.S. Roma.
