= Strawson =

Strawson is a surname. Notable people with the surname include:

- Galen Strawson (born 1952), English philosopher and literary critic
- John Strawson, British writer and academic
- John Strawson (British Army officer) (1921–2014), British Army general
- P. F. Strawson (1919–2006), English philosopher
