= Edoardo Perroncito =

Italian parasitologist

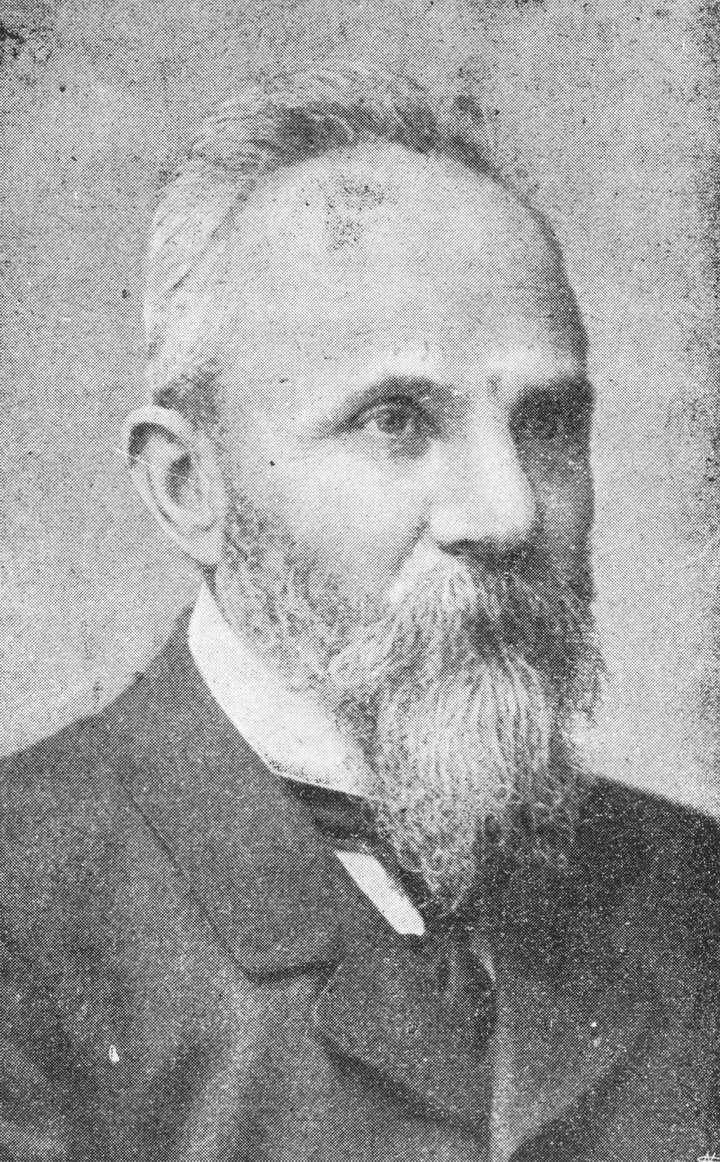
Edoardo Perroncito

Edoardo Bellarmino Perroncito (10 March 1847, Viale in the Province of Asti – 4 November 1936) was an Italian parasitologist. He was the father of pathologist Aldo Perroncito (1882–1929).

He earned his degree in veterinary medicine, and in 1879 he became a professor of parasitology to the Faculty of Veterinary Medicine at the University of Turin.

Remembered for his extensive research of Ancylostoma duodenale (hookworm), in 1880 he determined that hookworm was the cause of anemia being suffered by workmen building the St. Gotthard railway tunnel. He was the first to recommend using an extract of the Male Fern (Dryopteris filix-mas) as a remedy for the disease. In 1878 he identified the highly contagious disease of domestic fowl which is considered to be the first historical record of avian influenza (initially known as a fowl plague).

== Selected writings ==
- L'anemia dei contadini, fornaciai e minatori in rapporto coll'attuale epidemia negli operai del Gottardo. Studi ed osservazioni, profilassi e cura, 1881 - The anemia of farmers, miners and kiln workers in relation to the epidemic of the St. Gotthard workers. Study and observation, prevention and remedy.
- La Tubercolosi dei bovini in rapporto alla tubercolosi umana, 1903 - Tuberculosis in cattle in relation to human tuberculosis.
- La malattia dei minatori, dal S. Gottardo al Sempione, una questione risolta, 1909 - The disease of miners, St. Gotthard to Simplon, a settled issue.
