= Chris Welty =

American computer scientist

- Education: Rensselaer Polytechnic Institute
- Scientific career
- Fields: Computer Science
- Workplaces: Vassar College

Christopher A. Welty is an American computer scientist, who works at Google Research in New York. He is best known for his work on ontologies, in the Semantic Web, on IBM's Watson, and on Google's Gemini. While on sabbatical from Vassar College from 1999 to 2000, he collaborated with Nicola Guarino on OntoClean; he was co-chair of the Rule Interchange Format working group from 2005 to 2009.

== Background and education ==
Welty is a graduate of Rensselaer Polytechnic Institute, (RPI) where he worked for the Free Software Foundation on version 16-18 of GNU Emacs as well as the formation of NYSERNet during the emergence of the Internet. This synergy of interests made him an early public figure in AI, as he moderated the "NL-KR Digest" and the corresponding comp.ai.nlang-know-rep newsgroup (now defunct), which was at the time the widest vehicle for dissemination of announcements and moderated discussion in the natural language and knowledge representation communities. He later became the editor in chief of intelligence Magazine (sic), published by ACM. This magazine was published in place of the SIGART Bulletin from 1999 to 2001.

Welty began to make his first scientific contributions in the early 1990s, when he emerged as a leading figure in the Automated Software Engineering community, whose on-line bibliography lists his 1995 paper as one of the best papers that year (this would be the year he finished his PhD), becoming in each successive year the program chair, general chair, and steering committee chair of that conference.

His PhD work focused on extending the work of Prem Devanbu at AT&T on Lassie with a better developed ontology. After his PhD, he moved to Vassar College, where his work shifted away from Software Engineering and towards ontology. In 1998, he published seminal work on the analysis of subjects in library information systems, dispelling the widely held myth at the time (which is now resurfacing) that subject taxonomies are ontologies.

== OntoClean ==
During 1999-2000, while on sabbatical from Vassar College in Padova, Italy, he formed a productive collaboration with Nicola Guarino to develop OntoClean, a notable and widely recognized contribution in Artificial Intelligence, specifically Ontologies. According to Thompson-ISI, work on OntoClean was the most cited of academic papers on Ontology. OntoClean was important as it was the first formal methodology for ontology engineering, applying scientific principles to a field whose practice was mostly art.

== Semantic Web ==
Although an active participant in the Semantic Web movement from the start, it was only after he moved to IBM Research, that he formally joined the W3C Web Ontology Language working group, as a co-editor of the OWL Guide.

From 2004-2005, at the end of the OWL WG, Welty led the Ontology Engineering and Patterns efforts in the Semantic Web Best Practices WG, helping to edit several important notes on using OWL, as well as the first W3C ontology for part-whole relations and time.

From 2005-2009, he was co-chair of the Rule Interchange Format (RIF) working group.

In 2007, he gave a keynote talk at the 6th International Semantic Web Conference in Busan, Korea.

== Watson ==
Welty was one of the developers of Watson, the IBM computer that defeated the best players on the American game show Jeopardy!. He is identified as a member of the "Core Algorithms Team" and has said he is one of the 12 original members of the Watson team . He appeared on the televised broadcasts of the show several times, commenting on the scientific aspects of the challenge and accomplishment, and was interviewed in numerous news broadcasts and publications. He hosted the "viewing party" at RPI's EMPAC on all three nights the show was aired (February 14–16). He gave the keynote talk on Watson at the Trentino region launching of the Semantic Valley initiative.
