= Enrica Calabresi =

Italian scientist (1891–1944)

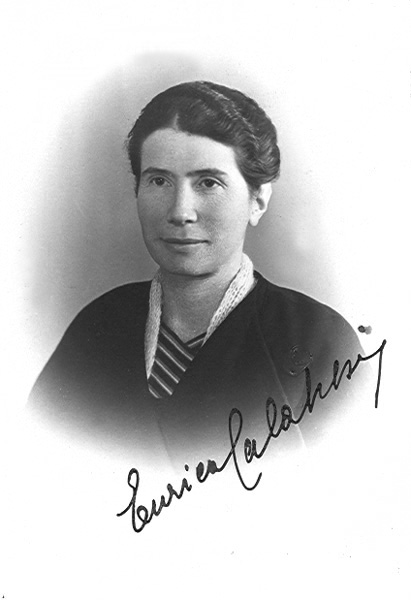
- Calabresi in 1936
- Born: 10 November 1891; Ferrara, Italy
- Died: 20 January 1944 (aged 52); Florence
- Education: University of Florence
- Occupations: Scientist, teacher
- Parents: Vito Calabresi (father); Ida Fano (mother)

Enrica Calabresi (10 November 1891, in Ferrara – 20 January 1944, in Castelfiorentino) was an Italian zoologist, herpetologist, and entomologist. Her family was part of the Jewish community, which has played an important role in Ferrara continuously since the Middle Ages.

== Life ==
Calabresi was the last of four children of Vito Calabresi and Ida Fano, a family that was part of the wealthy Jewish bourgeoisie of Ferrara, Italy.

In 1909, Calabresi enrolled in the Faculty of Mathematics of the Free University of Ferrara to study science. She graduated from the University of Florence in natural sciences on 1 July 1914 with a thesis on the hedgehog, Sul comportamento del condrioma nel pancreas e nelle ghiandole salivari del riccio durante il letargo invernale e l’attività estiva [On the Behavior of the Chondriome in the Pancreas and in the Salivary Glands of the Hedgehog during Winter Hibernation and Summer Activity].

=== Scientist ===
Beginning on 1 February 1914, before graduating, she became an assistant in the Cabinet of Zoology and Comparative Anatomy of Vertebrates at the University of Florence. She was also secretary of the Italian Entomological Society from 1918 to 1921. In 1924, she obtained a teaching diploma and taught in the same university. In the academic years 1936–1937 and 1937–1938, she held the chair of Agricultural Entomology on the Faculty of Agriculture of the University of Pisa.

Even as a young student, she was particularly interested in the biology of reptiles and amphibians. Among insects, she was very interested in brentid beetles. Her specimen collections allowed the Zoological Museum "La Specola" in Florence to expand its own exhibits considerably.

=== Purged ===
On 14 December 1938, Calabresi was declared unqualified to teach in state universities because of her Jewish race. She had a chance to flee Italy for Switzerland with her family, but chose instead to remain in Florence to teach in the Jewish School of Florence, populated by Jewish children who had been expelled from public schools. She taught sciences there with Maria Piazza from 1939 to 1943, but in January 1944, she was arrested by Nazi forces and held in the Santuario di Santa Verdiana, a former convent converted to a prison.

Knowing that she was to be deported from there to the Auschwitz extermination camp, she committed suicide by swallowing poison that she had been carrying with her for some time. She died during the night between 19 and 20 January 1944.

== Research ==
- In Entomology she worked on Hoplopistiini, Arrhenodini and the genus Stratiorrhina.
- In Herpetology she worked on African Amphibia and Reptilia and on the European species Vipera aspis.
- In Invertebrate Zoology she worked on the life history of Ceriantharia of the Red Sea.

== Recognition ==
In recognition of her work, a snake was named after her, Afrotyphlops calabresii Gans & Laurent 1965. Ironically, Gans & Laurent recognised her for being the “author of the earliest modern reviews of the Somali herpetofauna”, but misspelt her name as "Enrico".

== Sources ==
- Poggesi, Marta; Sforzi, Alessandra (2001). "In ricordo di Enrica Calabresi ". Memorie della Società Entomologica Italaliana 80: 223-233. (in Italian).
