= Maurizio Diana =

Italian geologist, physicist and painter

Maurizio Diana (born August 4, 1939) is an Italian geologist, physicist and painter. In his scientific research activities he is remembered particularly for his efforts in the development of technologies in the field of Cultural Heritage.

== First researches ==
He was born in Rome and graduated in Geology in 1964 from the University of Rome La Sapienza with a thesis on "Physical nature and size of the Earth's Core". He became a Volunteer at the chair of Seismology directed by Professor Pietro Caloi in academic years 1964–1967.

Since graduation he is a researcher at the ENEA (National Committee for Nuclear Energy) in the Research Centre "Casaccia" of Rome, where he conducts research on the material damage produced by ionizing particles (Radiation Damage). At the same time he is research associate at the European Joint Research Centre: Ispra.

From 1966 he began a long line of research on the Atomic Scattering Factor of metals for the knowledge of the electronic configurations of metal elements from Titanium to Copper (3d elements) in collaboration with the Research Centre MASS (U.S. Army Materials and Mechanics Research Centre in Watertown).

In 1968, after a visit to the facilities of the reactors CEA Saclay (France) he participated in the development and construction of a neutron collimator for the development of the diagnostic systems of Neutronigraphy at the Triga Mark II reactor of the Casaccia.

In 1969 he began a research program, with practical application perspectives, on the technique of Small-Angle X-ray Scattering, as a research associate at the University of Paris-Orsay Laboratoire de Physique des Solides directed by Professor André Guinier (inventor of the "Guinier chamber"), to work at the creation of an instrument for the technique of Small Angle x-ray for high penetration. In 1971, with the same technique, he built at the laboratories of Casaccia an analysis system for the study of the size and distribution of pores in alumina filters, used for uranium enrichment. From 1972 to 1996 he was head of research at the CNEN (that then became ENEA).

== Technology applied to cultural heritage ==
In 1983 he started the activity of technology transfer to the field of Cultural Heritage, creating an innovative model for management of resources and research facilities: a selected group of experts appointed by him develop specific research and begin to offer services to the operating structures (Superintendents) of the Ministry of Cultural Heritage, using the most advanced laboratories of ENEA. In 1984 he coordinated the first of a long series of projects dedicated entirely to the preservation of Italian heritage: “Seismic safety of Monuments”. Subsequently, he coordinated the project “Studies of microclimate in museums: Pinacoteca di Brera (Milan), Museum of Viterbo, Museum of Capodimonte (Naples)."

That same year, he coordinated the work of analysis of the Angel of Castel Sant'Angelo, the famous work of Peter Anton von Verschaffelt among the best known symbols of the artistic heritage of Rome. The Angel, never moved from the time of its installation in 1753, was dismantled into its constituent thirty pieces, arranged in as many containers on the terrace of Castel S. Angelo, and transported to the ENEA Casaccia Research Centre with an Army helicopter.

In 1985, he created the project "Design of an advanced system for semi-automatic cataloging of archaeological ceramics" (Stelit Systems S.p.A.) and the following year he promoted and coordinated the "Project Piemonte", in collaboration with Fiat Engineering, the Programme "Cultural deposits" of the Ministry of Cultural Heritage.

In 1986 Maurizio Diana and his team took part in the Venice Biennale in the section "Art and Science" with a didactic analysis on capillary action of water within the walls of the palaces of Venice, through the technique of "radiative capture of neutrons".

== Importance of ENEA projects in Italy and abroad ==
In light of the important scientific value of ENEA researches in the conservation of Cultural Heritage promoted and coordinated by Maurizio Diana, in Italy and in the rest of the world an interest develops for the use of new technologies in this field.

In 1988 Maurizio Diana, together with an ENEA delegation led by him, went to Moscow for "Italia 2000" (exhibition of Italian excellence organized by ICE) with the statue of "Aegis Jupiter" of the Archaeological Superintendency of Rome and exposes to the USSR President Mikhail Gorbachev and the Italian Prime Minister Ciriaco De Mita performing live on the diagnostic techniques used on the statue . In 1989 he is appointed Director of Macro-structure Project "Technology for the Safeguarding of Artistic Heritage". This important project has achieved in 10 years of activity over 500 diagnostic interventions of many important works of art. The evolution of technologies applied to Cultural Heritage generated more interest in the academic and scientific worlds, and between the late eighties and early nineties Diana decided to channel this growing interest in the organization of three major international conferences devoted entirely to the relationship between heritage and science: in 1987 “Science as Art” in Rome, in 1992 "Art and Science" in Vinci, in 1993 "The Instruments of Memory" in Bologna.

The team of Maurizio Diana, in the wake of considerable interest for the cutting-edge research in the field, participated in numerous international events, such as: the conference for the European project “Eureka! L'Europe” in Paris (1987), the World Expo in Seville (1992), the exhibition "Tecnova" in Madrid (1987), the conference "Worldtech" in Vienna in 1989.

In 1993 Diana organized the ICE Week "Italian Technology for Cultural Heritage" in the city of Chicago, a major conference and exposition dedicated to technological innovation in the Italian sector.

In support of the activities of ENEA for research in the field of conservation of cultural heritage he promoted and directed the publication of four volumes: “New technologies for the Protection of Artistic Heritage” (published by De Luca, 1985), “Technologies for Culture” (published by De Luca, 1988), “The Chimera of Arezzo” (ed. Il Torchio, Firenze, 1992), and “The activities of ENEA for Cultural Heritage” (ed. Il Torchio, Firenze 1995).

== The 2000s: teaching and large restorations ==
After finishing his work at ENEA, Diana decided to continue his experience as a scientist of Cultural Heritage freelance and put at the service of the university his vast experience in the industry. In 2000 he was adjunct professor for the Course of “Technology Applied to Restoration and Conservation of Cultural Heritage” of the Faculty of Science, University of Rome “La Sapienza”, in 2002 is the founder and coordinator of the Training Course "Physical non-destructive investigations' of Cultural Heritage methods" at the Faculty of Physics. From that experience the book "Physical Methods for non-destructive investigations of Cultural Heritage", edited by Maurizio Diana together with Prof. Giovanni E. Gigante, later used as a study text in many Italian universities, would be born in 2005.

For all the 2000s Maurizio Diana offered his professional expertise for the development of major projects of restoration of essential artistic goods and of cultural interest of the country. In 2003 he directed the scientific analysis of the restoration of the "Apollo of Veii" and the following year of the "Heracles of Veii", two important life-size clay statues in the Museum of Villa Giulia in Rome. In parallel with the restoration of the statues of Veii, he was responsible for the scientific analysis for the restoration of the Chapel of Italy in the St. John's Co-Cathedral in Valletta (Malta). 2005 is the year of the stone statue "The girl of Anzio" of the National Museum of Rome and in 2008 of the Lateran Obelisk, the Obelisk placed in Piazza San Giovanni in Laterano in Rome, including the coordination of scientific investigations on the conservation status and the stability of the work.

In 2006, in the wake of this series of major renovations, Diana was rewarded by Legambiente at the launch of the campaign "Salvalarte" with the "Friends of Art Award" born to report "ten personas working in the cultural heritage that have distinguished themselves for having contributed to the restoration of works of art at risk, to carry on the battles in defence of the protection of cultural heritage, having returned to legality and citizens pieces of art stolen and/or violated, or for finding innovative ways of management and use of historical and artistic heritage".

== Artistic activity ==
At the same time, Diana has joined the business of scientist as a painter started from the age of adolescence. In the sixties, following the trend of neo-figurative art in the wake of "the Roman School", in 1969 he worked in Paris in an avant-garde group (CAP, Comité d'Action Plasticien) experimenting and applying collective painting on current politics affairs through the production of "posters" for posting on the roads and for public debate (copies of these posters, donated by him, are preserved at the Musée de la Publicité in Paris). In the seventies, he worked with the gallery "Il Babbuino" of Rome, and participated in the Paris salons of the "Jeune Peinture" and "Figuration Critique".

From the eighties he developed an innovative image composition method where great paintings become installations in which the images painted on canvas blend with landscapes and physical locations through a in black and white slide show and the variation of the intensity of the projected light.

The eighties saw the production of many works that take advantage of this new compositional technique. The creation of works with this technique is immortalized in a documentary produced in collaboration with the director Luciano Emmer titled "The Last Supper? – Movements of Light and Sound".

From 2000 onwards he consolidated its presence abroad with solo and group exhibitions. In 2003 he was invited to the Biennale of Alexandria (Egypt), in 2008 he has a solo in Valletta organized by the Italian Institute of Culture in Malta, in the same year he went to Paris for a solo organized by the Italian Institute of Culture of Paris and the Italian Chamber of Commerce in France. Since 2008, he participated in the Salon des Artistes Independants at the Grand Palais in Paris, in 2009 he organized an exhibition at the Italian Consulate in Lille and celebrated 50 years of artistic activity at Ferrajoli Palace in Rome.

In 2011 he participated in the "100 Artists of Hangzhou", organized by Hangzhou Cultural Brand Promotion Organization, on behalf of the city of Hangzhou, and Assoartisti-Confesercenti, with the goal of increasing cultural exchange between Italy and China through the language of art.

In 2013 the monograph "Maurizio Diana – Une figuration illuminée", written by the French art critic Gérard Xuriguera, which covers the last years of artistic production characterized by the fusion of the image with the bright component, is released.

His works are in many private collections and part of the graphic works is preserved at the Bibliotheque Nationale de France in the "Collections des Estampes du XXème siècle".

== Presence in institutional committees ==
- New University Courses in Conservation of Cultural Heritage (1984)
- Diffusion of Scientific Culture of the Ministry for Scientific Research (1994)
- Mapping of Critical Loads for the Ministry of the Environment (1994)
- Member of the Scientific Committee of the "2nd International Conference on non-destructive testing, microanalytical methods and environment evaluation for study and conservation of works of art" (1988)
- Coordinator of the Scientific Committee dell'ARPAI (Association for the Restoration of Artistic Italian Heritage), a position still held.
- Member of the Scientific Committee of the "3rd International conference on non-destructive testing, microanalytical methods and environment evaluation for study and conservation of works of art" (1992)
- Member of the Scientific Committee "6th international conference on non-destructive testing and microanalysis for diagnostics and conservation of cultural and Environmental Heritage" (1999)
- Member of the Scientific Committee of the Conference AIAr "Towards new professionals for the study, preservation, management of Cultural Heritage" (2000)
- Member of the Scientific Committee of the Second National Congress of Italian Association of Archaeometry, "Science for Cultural Heritage" (2002)
- Member of the Scientific Committee of the "Center Zetema" for the enhancement of historical and environmental resources in Matera, 1991–1996
- Head of the sub-project "Non-destructive testing" of the European project Eurocare-Copal (1990)
- Responsible for the international pilot project funded by the EEC Greece-Italy (ECC- STEP n ° 0143 – IT) on the conservation of stone in populated areas (1991)
- Coordinator of the ENEA-ICCD (Central Institute for Cataloguing and Documentation of the Ministry of Cultural Heritage) 1991–1995
- Founding member and first president dell'AIAr, the Italian Association of Archaeometry and Director of the same from 1999 to 2003
- Curator of AIAr News for the numbers 0 and "Special Issue" (1999)
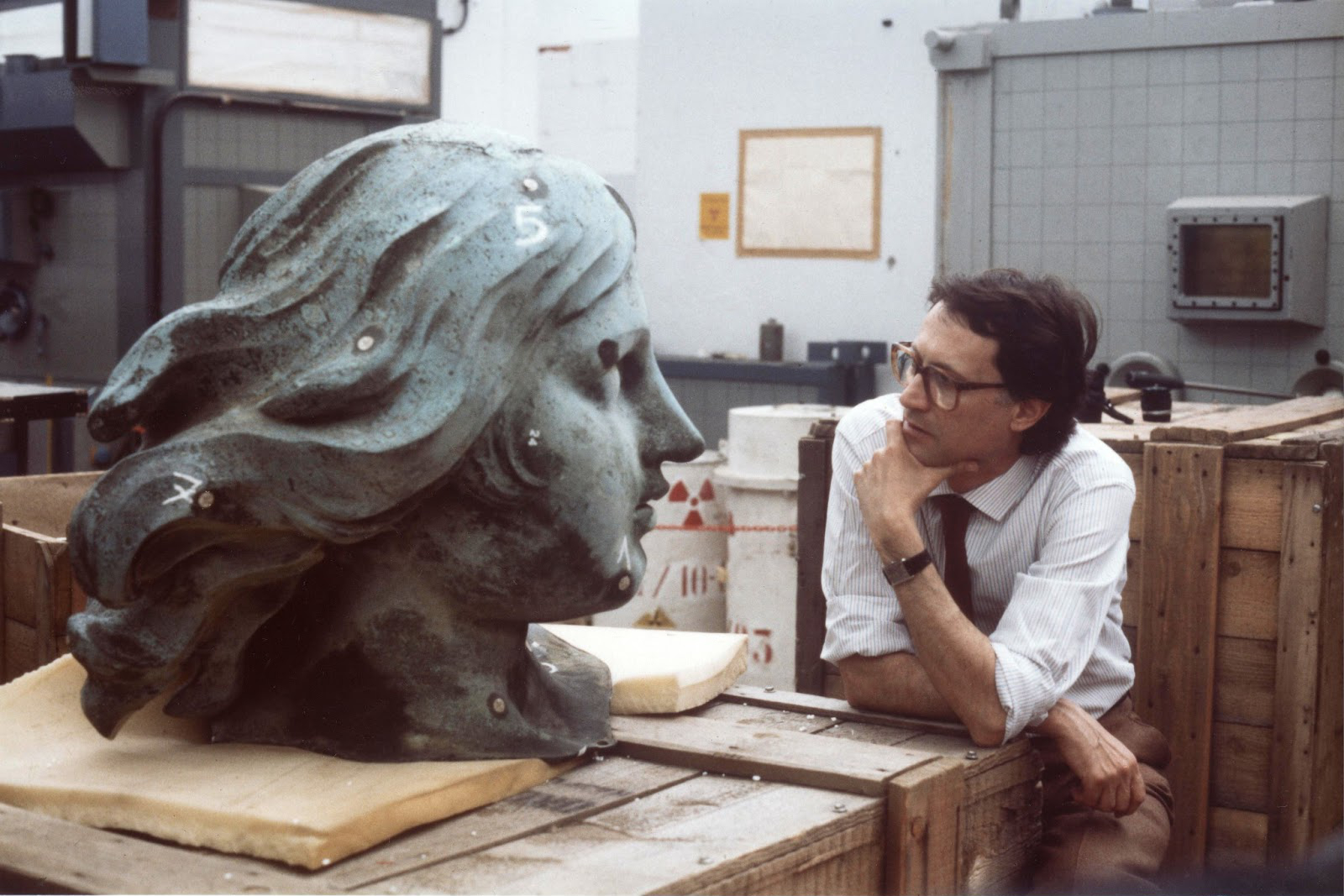
  Maurizio Diana, is an Italian geologist, physicist and painter.

== Bibliography ==
- Various Authors, "La queue de l'Utopie: les affiches du CAP (comité d'action plasticien): 1968–1969”, De Luca Editori d’Arte, Rome 1989.
- Maurizio Diana, “Maurizio Diana. Pittore” (Maurizio Diana. Painter), De Luca Editori d’Arte, Rome 1997
- Gérard Xuriguera, "Maurizio Diana 'Une figuration illuminée'" Gangemi Editore, Rome 2012
