= Carlo Somigliana =

Italian mathematician and physicist (1860–1955)

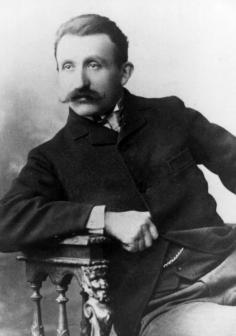
- Born: 20 September 1860; Como, Italy
- Died: 20 June 1955 (aged 94); Casanova Lanza, Italy
- Education: Scuola Normale Superiore di Pisa
- Known for: Somigliana identity
- Scientific career
- Fields: Mathematical physics Theory of elasticity Glaciology
- Doctoral advisor: Eugenio Beltrami

Carlo Somigliana (20 September 1860 – 20 June 1955) was an Italian mathematician and a classical mathematical physicist, faithful member of the school of Enrico Betti and Eugenio Beltrami. He made important contributions to linear elasticity: the Somigliana integral equation, analogous to Green's formula in potential theory, and the Somigliana dislocations are named after him. Other fields he contribute to include seismic wave propagation, gravimetry and glaciology. One of his ancestors through his mother was Alessandro Volta.

== Life and career ==
Carlo Somigliana began his university studies in Pavia, where he was a student of Eugenio Beltrami. Later he moved to Pisa and had Betti among his teachers: in Pisa he established a lifelong friendship with Vito Volterra, who was one of his classmates, lasted until the death of the latter. He graduated from Scuola Normale Superiore di Pisa in 1881. In 1887 Somigliana began teaching as an assistant at the University of Pavia. In 1892, as the result of a competitive examination, he was appointed as University Professor of Mathematical Physics. Somigliana was called to Turin University in 1903, to hold the Chair of Mathematical Physics: He held the position until his retirement in 1935, and then he moved to Milan to live there. During the World War II, his Milan apartment was destroyed, and he moved to his family villa in Casanova Lanza: though he retired from all his teaching duties after 1935, he did scientific research until close to his death in 1955.

=== Honors ===
On July 20, 1897, he was elected corresponding member of the Accademia Nazionale dei Lincei: subsequently, on 17 September 1908, he was elected national member. On January 18, 1939, he was elected member of the Pontifical Academy of Sciences.

== Selected publications ==
=== Historical, biographical and commemorative works ===
- Somigliana, Carlo (December 1909), "Giacinto Morera", Il Nuovo Cimento, Serie V (in Italian), 17 (1): 191–194, Bibcode:1909NCim...17..191S, doi:10.1007/BF02709438, JFM 40.0038.03, S2CID 186242236.
- Somigliana, Carlo (24 April 1910), "Giacinto Morera", Atti della Reale Accademia delle Scienze di Torino (in Italian), 45 (1): 573–583, Bibcode:1909NCim...17..191S, doi:10.1007/BF02709438, JFM 41.0023.04, S2CID 186242236.
- Somigliana, Carlo (1910a), "Commemorazione del Socio nazionale prof. Giacinto Morera", Rendiconti della Reale Accademia dei Lincei, Classe di Scienze Fisiche, Matematiche, Naturali, Serie V (in Italian), 19 (1): 604–612, JFM 41.0023.05.
- Somigliana, Carlo (1942), "Vito Volterra. Discorso commemorativo pronunciato nella Prima Tornata Ordinaria del Sesto Anno Accademico, il 30 novembre 1941 (cum 2 tab.)" (PDF), Acta Pontificia Academia Scientarum, 6: 57–86, JFM 68.0018.15, MR 0026620, Zbl 0060.01808. The "Commemorative address pronounced on the occasion of the first seance of the sixth academic year, on the 30th of November 1941" (English translation of the title) by Carlo Somigliana, colleague and friend of Vito Volterra.

== See also ==
- Boundary element method
- Somigliana equation
