= Maria Piazza =

Italian mineralogist and educator (1894–1976)

Maria Piazza (1894–1976) was an Italian mineralogist and educator who earned her doctorate at the University of Rome and received the Italian Order of Merit for being a clandestine teacher of Jewish children who had been removed from Italian schools during the fascist occupation of the city in World War II.

== Biography ==
Piazza was born in Ariano di Puglia (currently Ariano Irpino, in the province of Avellino) on 2 July 1894.

She attended the University of Naples and graduated in 1916 with an undergraduate degree in chemistry, which allowed her to begin teaching in middle school. In 1925, she continued her education at the University of Rome and completed her doctoral studies there. She went to volunteer at the Institute of Mineralogy for several years. In 1932, she earned teacher qualifications in mineralogy even as she was teaching in several Roman high schools (including the exclusive Visconti high school) and became an editor of the geology and mineralogy volumes of the Italian Encyclopedia.

In 1938, new racial laws were introduced in Italy by its fascist regime, which took away the civil rights of the country's citizens of Jewish origin. Piazza was removed from her teaching post and barred from her professional organizations: the Italian Geological Society and the Italian Society for the Progress of Science.

From 1939 to 1943, she taught chemistry in the special community schools that Jewish students attended after they were expelled from the public schools. These institutes were allowed by officials but controlled "through an 'Aryan' Commissioner, appointed directly by the Italian Ministry of National Education." Piazza helped organize the one in Rome in less than two months and divided it into two parts, a teacher training institute and a technical institute with a commercial focus.

The school was a legal state-owned institution, but the students took significant risks when they attended it. Fascist squads of enforcers constantly threatened the students. Two of the professors had already lost their university chairs, Emma Castelnuovo and Maria Piazza, as well as courageous Aryan teachers who joined the faculty of the new school, which opened in December 1938, near the Colosseum. In 1940–1941, the school was moved near the Israeli Asylum located at no. 13 Lungo Tevere Sanzio. The school's new location was only a few steps from the office where a special Italian tribunal monitored citizen activity.

In 1941, Jewish students who had graduated from secondary schools were prevented from attending public universities. In addition, the Jewish community was forbidden from establishing any private university classes. Still, in December 1941, using a fictitious name: “Integrative courses in mathematical culture,” Piazza taught at an outlaw university called L'Universita Clandestina A Roma. During her work there, Piazza is said to have distinguished herself as an "expert and demanding teacher."

She died in 1976.

== Honours ==
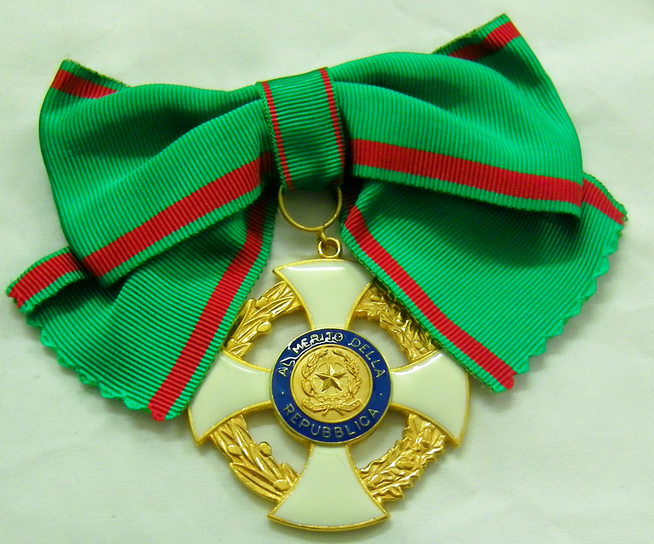
Commander's Ribbon of Order of Merit of the Republic of Italy

She was appointed Commander, Order of Merit of the Italian Republic.
