= Antonio Filippo Ciucci =

Italian physician

- Died: c. 1710; Macerata
- Known for: the "Filo d'Arianna"
- Scientific career
- Fields: Forensics

Antonio Filippo Ciucci was an Italian physician of the 17th century who wrote one of the first treatises of forensic toxicology, "II Filo di Arianna" ("Ariadne's thread").
