= Giacomo Antonio Cortuso =

Italian botanist

Giacomo Antonio Cortuso (1513–1603) was an Italian botanist.
