= Aldo Perroncito =

Aldo Perroncito (18 May 1882, Turin – 1929) was an Italian pathologist. He was the son of parasitologist Edoardo Perroncito (1847–1936). He is known for research involving regeneration of peripheral nerves, kinetic behavior of the Golgi apparatus during mitosis, and studies of pellagra.

In 1905 he obtained his medical doctorate from the University of Pavia, where he spent the following five years as an assistant to pathologist Camillo Golgi (1846–1926). During this time period he also conducted studies at the Institute of Physiology in Berlin and at the Institute of Parasitology in Paris. Afterwards he taught classes in general pathology at the University of Cagliari, returning to Pavia in 1922 as a full professor and as a successor to Camillo Golgi.

While an assistant at Pavia, he demonstrated with a severed peripheral nerve, that the stump attached to the cell body was able to survive and regenerate new branches, while its other stump, being detached from the cell body, degenerated. In 1910 he discovered that a Golgi body dissociated into a number of elongated structures during cell division. Perroncito named the split up pieces "dictyosomes".

== Selected writings ==
- La rigenerazione delle fibre nervose, 1910 - Regeneration of nerve fibers.
- Eziologia della pellagra, 1913 - Etiology of pellagra.
- Ascite sperimentale, 1915 - Experiments involving ascites.
- Rigenerazione e trapianti, 1927 - Regeneration and transplantion.
