= List of Italian architects =

Following is a list of Italian architects.

== Early architects ==
- Marcus Agrippa
- Vitruvius

== Medieval architects ==
- Arnolfo di Cambio
- Pietro Baseggio
- Giotto di Bondone
- Arnolfo di Cambio
- Jacopo Celega
- Andrea Orcagna
- Andrea Pisano
- Giovanni Pisano

== Renaissance architects ==
- Aloisio da Milano
- Aloisio the New
- Baccio D'Agnolo
- Giovanni Battista Aleotti
- Leon Battista Alberti
- Galeazzo Alessi
- Bartolomeo Ammanati
- Donato Bramante
- Bramantino
- Filippo Brunelleschi
- Michelangelo Buonarroti
- Bernardo Buontalenti
- Giovanni Antonio Dosio
- Giacomo del Duca
- Luca Fancelli
- Giovanni Maria Falconetto
- Aristotile Fioravanti
- Domenico Fontana
- Girolamo Genga
- Pietro di Giacomo Cataneo
- Orazio Grassi
- Pirro Ligorio
- Annibale Lippi
- Pietro Lombardo
- Martino Longhi the Elder
- Onorio Longhi
- Luciano Laurana
- Annibale Maggi known as Da Bassano
- Giuliano da Maiano
- Antonio Manetti
- Fabio Mangone
- Giovanni Mangone
- Francesco di Giorgio Martini
- Filarete
- Michelozzo Michelozzi
- Nanni di Baccio Bigio
- Andrea Palladio
- Alfonso Parigi
- Baldassarre Peruzzi
- Petrok Maly
- Simone del Pollaiolo
- Antonio da Ponte
- Flaminio Ponzio
- Giacomo della Porta
- Giorgio da Sebenico
- Giulio Romano
- Bernardo Rossellino
- Antonio da Sangallo the Elder
- Antonio da Sangallo the Younger
- Giuliano da Sangallo
- Jacopo Sansovino
- Michele Sanmicheli
- Raffaello Santi known as Raphael
- Vincenzo Scamozzi
- Sebastiano Serlio
- Giorgio Vasari
- Giacomo Barozzi da Vignola
- Leonardo da Vinci
- Ascanio Vittozzi

== Baroque architects ==
- Giovan Battista Aleotti
- Alessandro Algardi
- Gian Lorenzo Bernini
- Francesco Borromini
- Pietro da Cortona
- Giovanni Pietro de Pomis
- Cosimo Fanzago
- Carlo Fontana
- Ferdinando Fuga
- Rosario Gagliardi
- Alessandro Galilei
- Antonio Gaspari
- Galli Bibiena
- Antonio Gherardi
- Andrea Giganti
- Giovanni Battista Gisleni
- Giovanni Francesco Grimaldi
- Guarino Guarini
- Angelo Italia
- Stefano Ittar
- Filippo Juvarra
- Paolo Labisi
- Giulio Lasso
- Giacomo Leoni
- Baldassarre Longhena
- Martino Longhi the Younger
- Carlo Maderno
- Domenico Martinelli
- Ottavio Mascherino
- Giorgio Massari
- Giovan Battista Montano
- Tomasso Napoli
- Giovanni Battista Nolli
- Andrea Palma
- Giovanni Paolo Pannini
- Giovanni Battista Piranesi
- Filippo Raguzzini
- Girolamo Rainaldi
- Carlo Rainaldi
- Pietro Rosa
- Mattia de Rossi
- Nicola Sabbatini
- Nicola Salvi
- Francesco de Sanctis
- Ferdinando Sanfelice
- Giuseppe Sardi
- Vincenzo Sinatra
- Giovanni Battista Soria
- Alessandro Specchi
- Giovanni Battista Vaccarini
- Luigi Vanvitelli
- Giuseppe Vasi
- Bernardo Vittone
- Giacomo Zanetti

== Neoclassical and eclectic architects ==
- Ferdinando Albertolli
- Giovanni Antonio Antolini
- Giuseppe Baldacci
- Giovan Battista Filippo Basile
- Pietro Camporese the Elder
- Pietro Camporese the Younger
- Antonio Cano
- Alessandro Galilei
- Costantino Fiaschetti
- Giuseppe Jappelli
- Giuseppe Venanzio Marvuglia
- Giovanni Battista Meduna
- Giuseppe Mengoni
- Giuseppe Piermarini
- Renzo Picasso
- Giovanni Battista Piranesi
- Leopoldo Pollack
- Bartolomeo Rastrelli
- Antonio Rinaldi
- Carlo Rossi
- Giuseppe Sacconi
- Faustino Trebbi
- Domenico Trezzini
- Giacomo Quarenghi
- Giuseppe Valadier
- Rodolfo Vantini
- Antonio Visentini
- Giuseppe Zanoia

== 20th-century architects ==
- Franco Albini
- Archizoom Associati
- Gae Aulenti
- Pietro Belluschi
- Luca Beltrami
- Ernesto Basile
- Alziro Bergonzo
- Lina Bo Bardi
- Cini Boeri
- Ada Bursi
- Renato Camus
- Achille Castiglioni
- Livio Castiglioni
- Pier Giacomo Castiglioni
- Francesco Cosenza
- Raimondo Tommaso D'Aronco
- Giancarlo De Carlo
- Florestano Di Fausto
- Anna Castelli Ferrieri
- Emanuele Fiano
- Gianfranco Frattini
- Ignazio Gardella
- Romaldo Giurgola
- Giorgio Grassi
- Vittorio Gregotti
- Franca Helg
- Adalberto Libera
- Angelo Mangiarotti
- Vico Magistretti
- Angiolo Mazzoni
- Alessandro Mendini
- Giovanni Michelucci
- Carlo Mollino
- Luigi Moretti
- Pier Luigi Nervi
- Giuseppe Pagano
- Cesare Paolini
- Marcello Piacentini
- Pio Piacentini
- Giò Ponti
- Ernesto Nathan Rogers
- Aldo Rossi
- Antonio Sant'Elia
- Afra and Tobia Scarpa
- Carlo Scarpa
- Ettore Sottsass
- Studio 65
- Superstudio
- Manfredo Tafuri
- Giuseppe Terragni
- Attilia Vaglieri
- Lella Vignelli
- Marco Zanuso
- Bruno Zevi

== Contemporary architects ==
- Gae Aulenti
- Mario Bellini
- Cini Boeri
- Robby Cantarutti
- Antonino Cardillo
- Massimiliano Fuksas
- Vittorio Gregotti
- Angelo Mangiarotti
- Alessandro Mendini
- Renzo Piano
- Paolo Portoghesi
- Italo Rota
- Paolo Soleri
- Benedetta Tagliabue
- Matteo Thun
- Angelo Torricelli
- Raffaella Laezza

== See also ==
- Architecture of Italy
- List of architects
- List of Italians
