= Giuseppe Passeri =

Italian painter

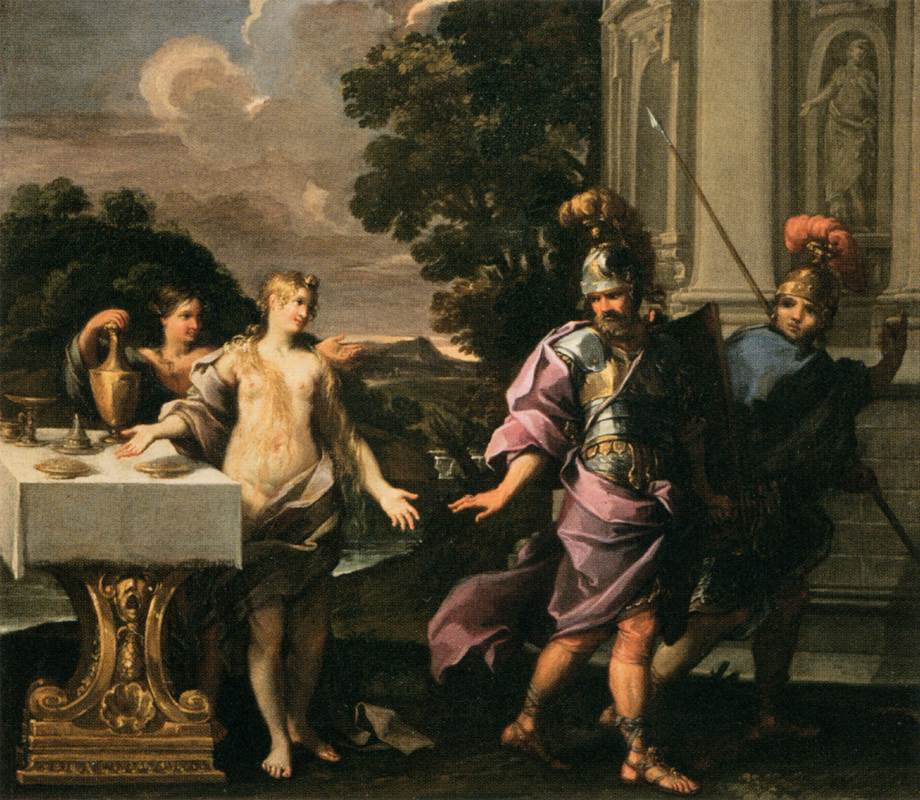
Companions of Armida and Rinaldo by Giuseppe Passeri, Musée du Louvre, 1685-1690

Giuseppe Passeri (12 March 1654 – 2 November 1714) was an Italian painter of the Baroque period, active in his native city of Rome.

Born the nephew of the painter Giovanni Battista Passeri, Giuseppe trained in the studio of Carlo Maratta. Among the paintings by Giuseppe is St. Peter baptizes the Centurion, transferred to mosaic; the original was moved to a church of the Conventuali in Urbino.

Passeri painted the second chapel on the right in Santa Caterina a Magnanapoli in fresco from 1700 to 1703. In the same church, he also painted the altar paintings Three Archangels and Madonna of the Rosary.
