= Giovanni Domenico Cerrini =

Italian painter

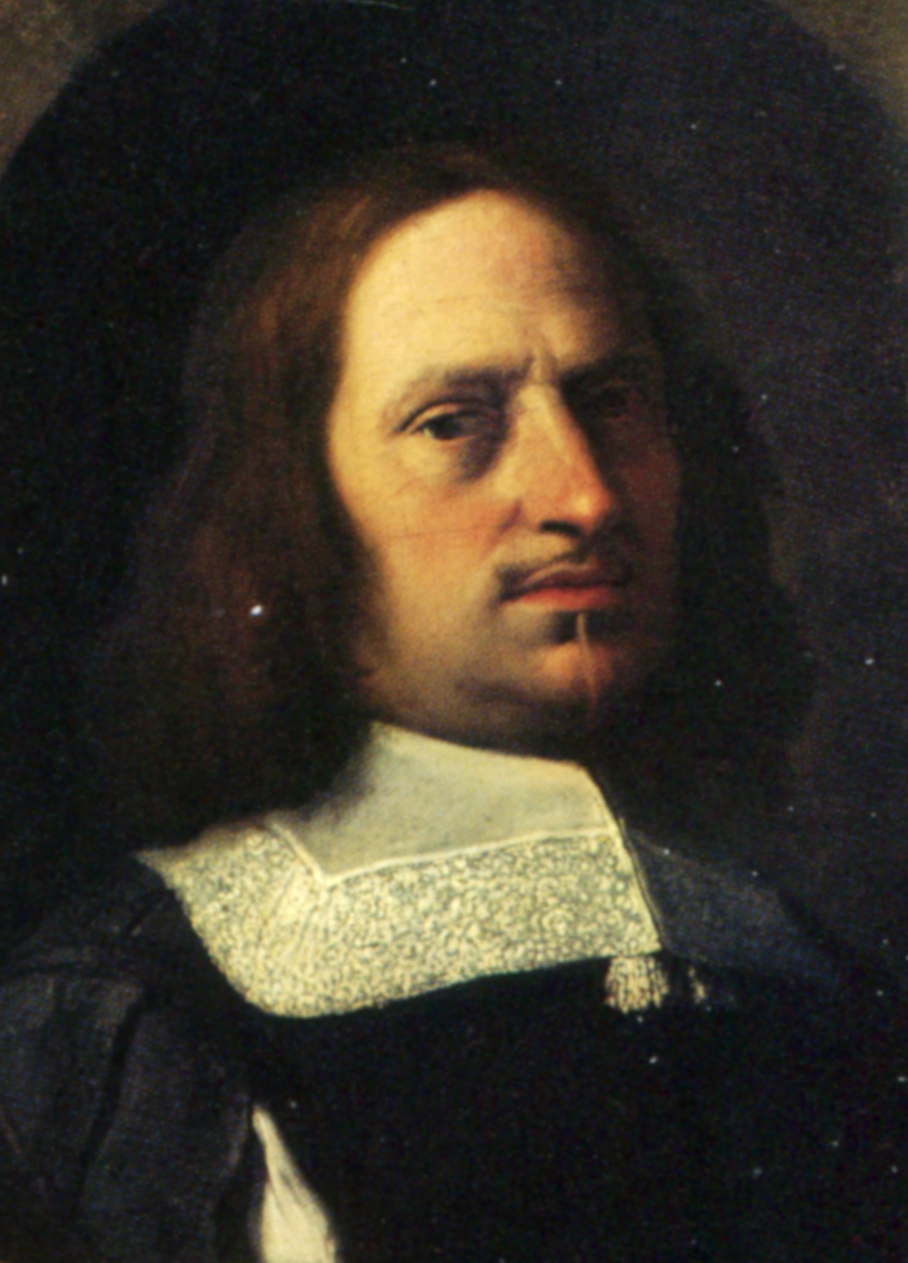
Self-portrait of Giovanni Domenico Cerrini (detail from Allegory of painting, c.1639).

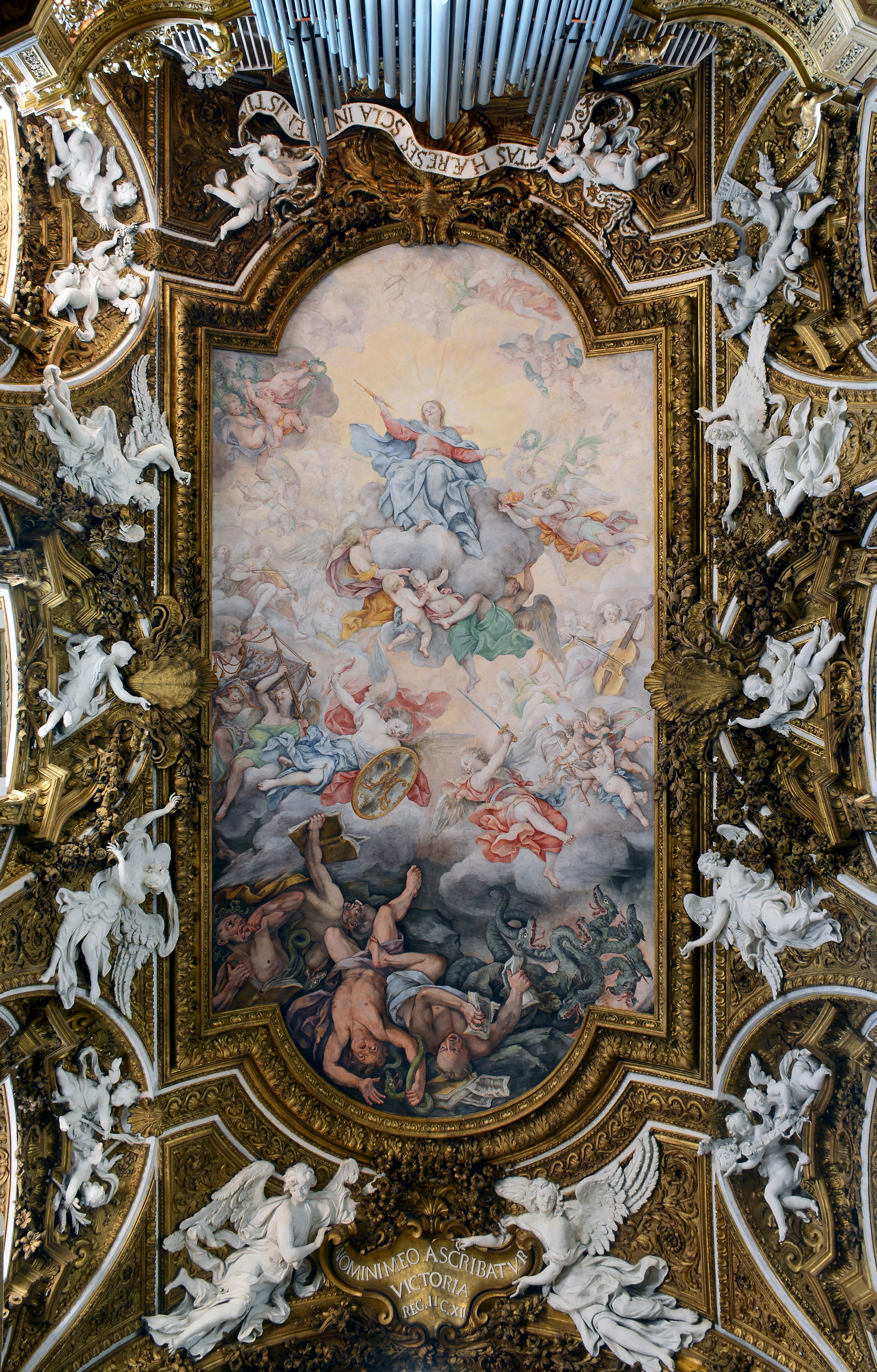
The Virgin Mary Triumphs over Heresy, Ceiling at Santa Maria della Vittoria, Rome

Giovanni Domenico Cerrini (1609–1681), also called Gian Domenico Cerrini or il Cavalier Perugino, was a painter of the Baroque period, born in Perugia and active mainly in Rome and influenced in large part by painters of the Bolognese School.

== Biography ==
Cerrini initially apprenticed under Giovanni Antonio Scaramuccia, then in 1638 moved into the Roman studio of Guido Reni. He was anyway strongly influenced also by Lanfranco, Guercino, Domenichino and Andrea Sacchi. He was patronized by the family of Cardinal Bernardino Spada. Cardinal Giulio Rospigliosi gave him the commission to decorate the cupola of Santa Maria della Vittoria (1654–1655).

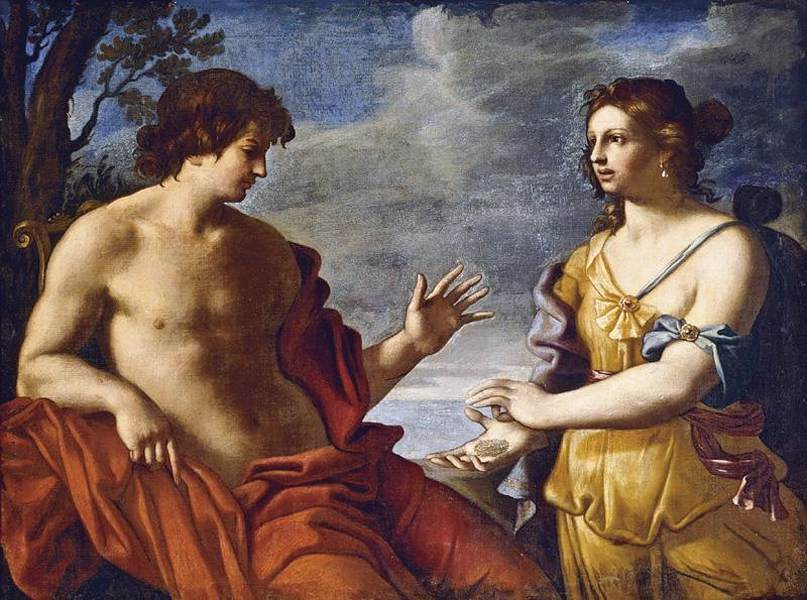
Apollo and the Cumaean Sibyl (detail).

Paintings of his can be found in many of the churches of Rome, where he died, including Santa Maria in Traspontina, San Carlino alle Quattro Fontane, Santa Maria in Vallicella, San Carlo ai Catinari, Santissimo Sudario dei Piemontesi, Sant'Isidoro, as well as in Galleria Colonna, Palazzo Spada, and the Palazzo Corsini art gallery.
