= Santa Maria della Vittoria, Rome =

Roman Catholic basilica in Rome, Italy

Santa Maria della Vittoria
- Saint Mary of Victory (English); Mariæ de Victoria (Latin)
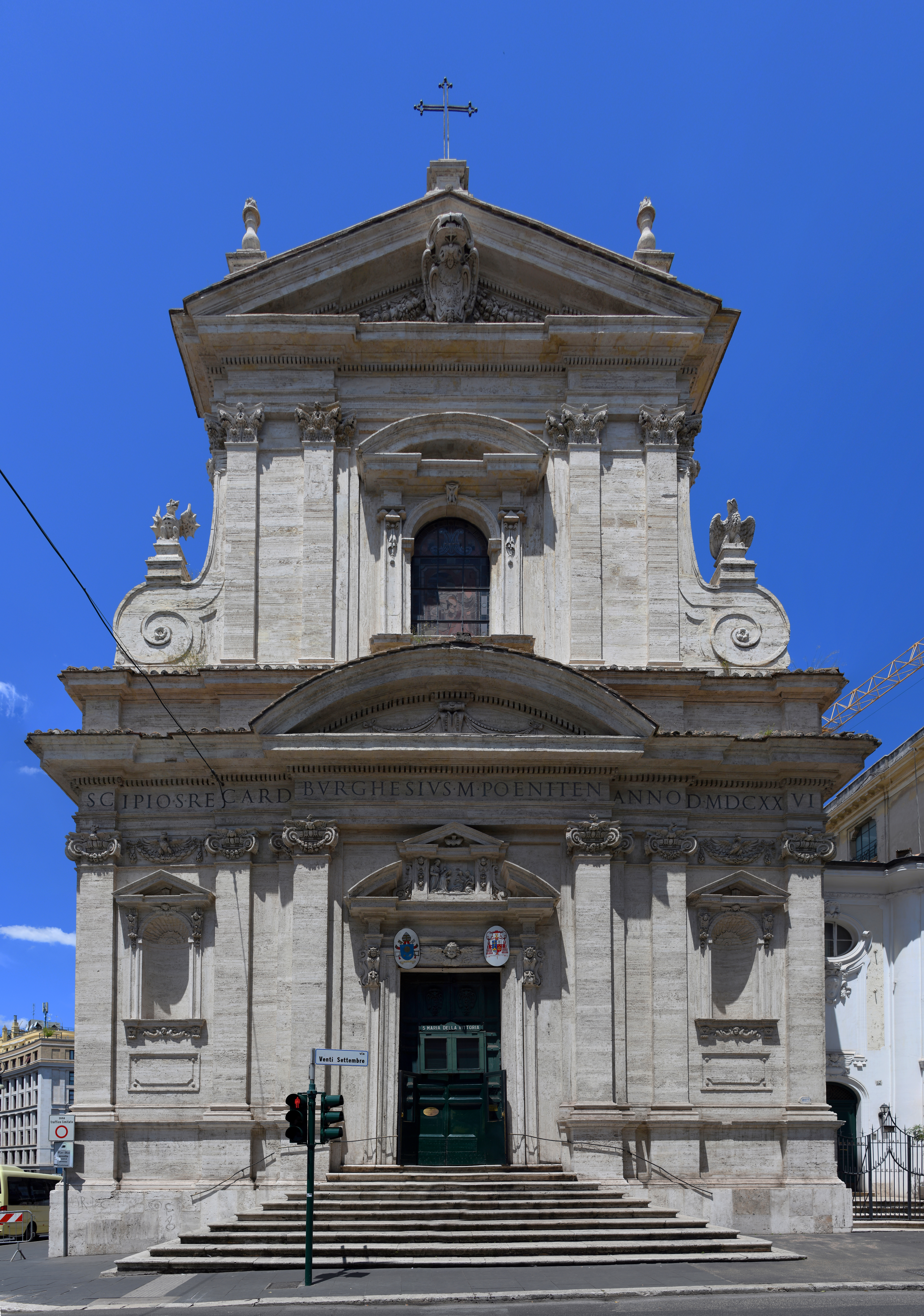
- Façade of Santa Maria della Vittoria
- Click on the map for a fullscreen view
- 41°54′17″N 12°29′39″E
- Location: Via Venti Settembre 17, Rome
- Country: Italy
- Denomination: Catholic
- Religious order: Discalced Carmelites

History
- Status: Titular church, minor basilica
- Dedication: Our Lady of Victories

Architecture
- Architect(s): Carlo Maderno; Giovanni Battista Soria
- Style: Baroque
- Groundbreaking: 1605
- Completed: 1620

Specifications
- Length: 35 m (115 ft)
- Width: 19 m (62 ft)

Santa Maria della Vittoria (English: Saint Mary of Victory, Latin: S. Mariae de Victoria) is a Catholic titular minor basilica and Discalced Carmelite conventual church dedicated to Our Lady of Victories in Rome, Italy, famously the home of Gian Lorenzo Bernini‘s masterpiece the Ecstasy of Saint Teresa. The church is in the Rione Sallustiano, on number 98 via XX Settembre, where this street intersects with Largo Santa Susanna. It is located next to the Fountain of Moses and mirrors the Church of Santa Susanna across the Largo. It is about two blocks northwest of the Piazza della Repubblica and Teatro dell'Opera metro station.

== History ==
The land for the church was purchased on April 20, 1607, and the church was built from 1608 to 1620 as a chapel dedicated to Saint Paul for the Discalced Carmelites. After the Catholic victory at the Battle of White Mountain in 1620, which reversed the Reformation in Bohemia, the church was rededicated to the Virgin Mary. Ottoman standards captured at the 1683 Battle of Vienna were later hung in the church, reinforcing to the theme of the Virgin helping lead Catholic armies to victory.

The order itself funded the building work until the discovery of the Borghese Hermaphroditus in the excavations. Scipione Borghese, Cardinal-nephew of Pope Paul V, appropriated this sculpture but, in return, funded the rest of work on the façade and granted the order his architect, Giovanni Battista Soria. These grants only came into effect in 1624, and work was completed two years later.

== Exterior ==
The church is the only structure entirely designed and completed by the early Baroque architect Carlo Maderno, though the interior suffered a fire in 1833 and required restoration. Its façade, however, was erected by Giovanni Battista Soria during Maderno's lifetime, 1624–1626, showing the unmistakable influence of Maderno's Santa Susanna nearby.

== Interior ==
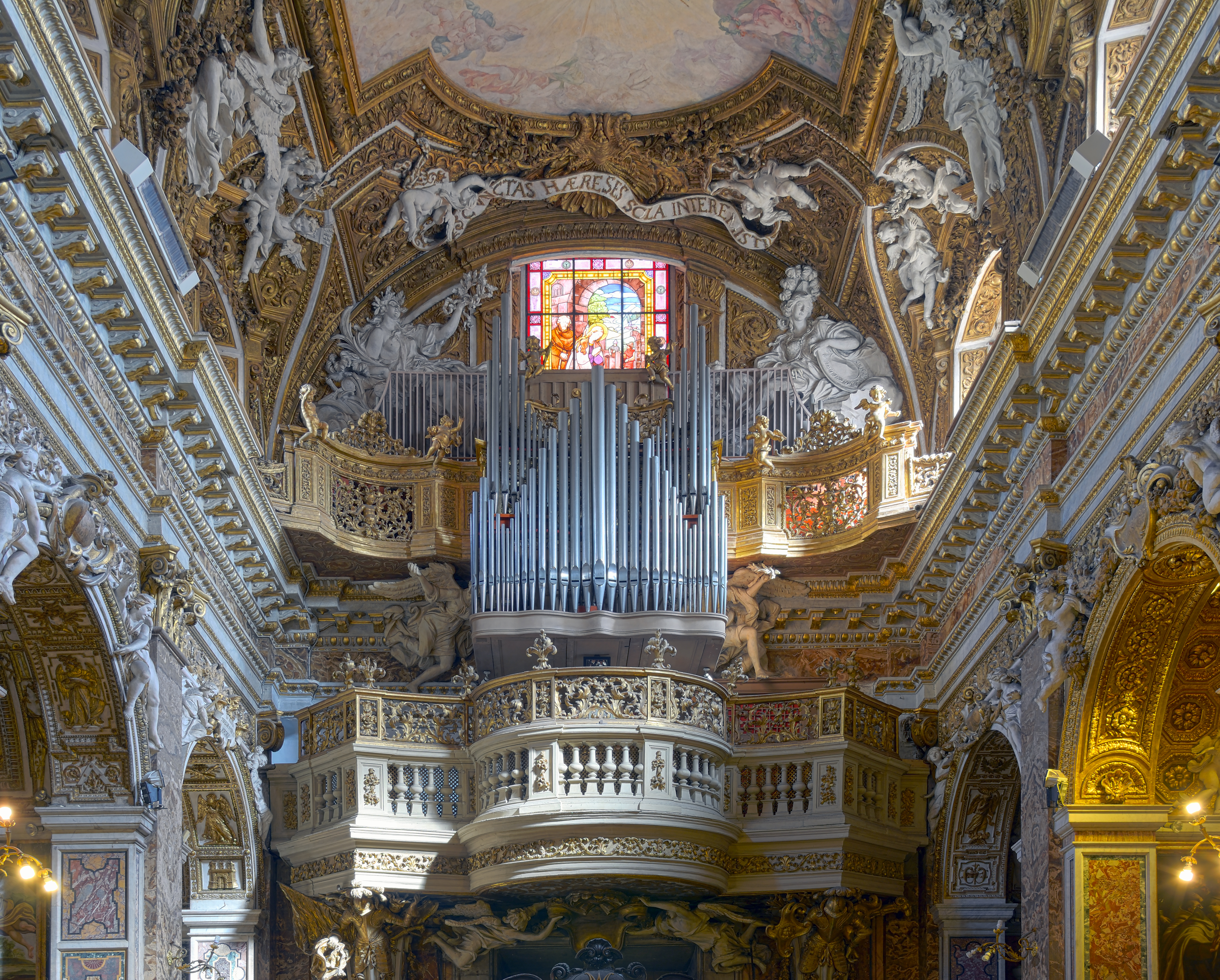
Cantoria of the Santa Maria della Vittoria church, decorated by Mattia de Rossi

The interior of the church has a single wide nave under a low segmental vault, with three interconnecting side chapels behind arches separated by colossal Corinthian pilasters with gilded capitals that support an enriched entablature. Contrasting marble revetments are enriched with white and gilded stucco angels and putti in full relief. The interior was sequentially enriched after Maderno's death; its vault was frescoed in 1675 with triumphant themes within shaped compartments with feigned frames: The Virgin Mary Triumphing over Heresy and Fall of the Rebel Angels executed by Giovanni Domenico Cerrini in 1675.

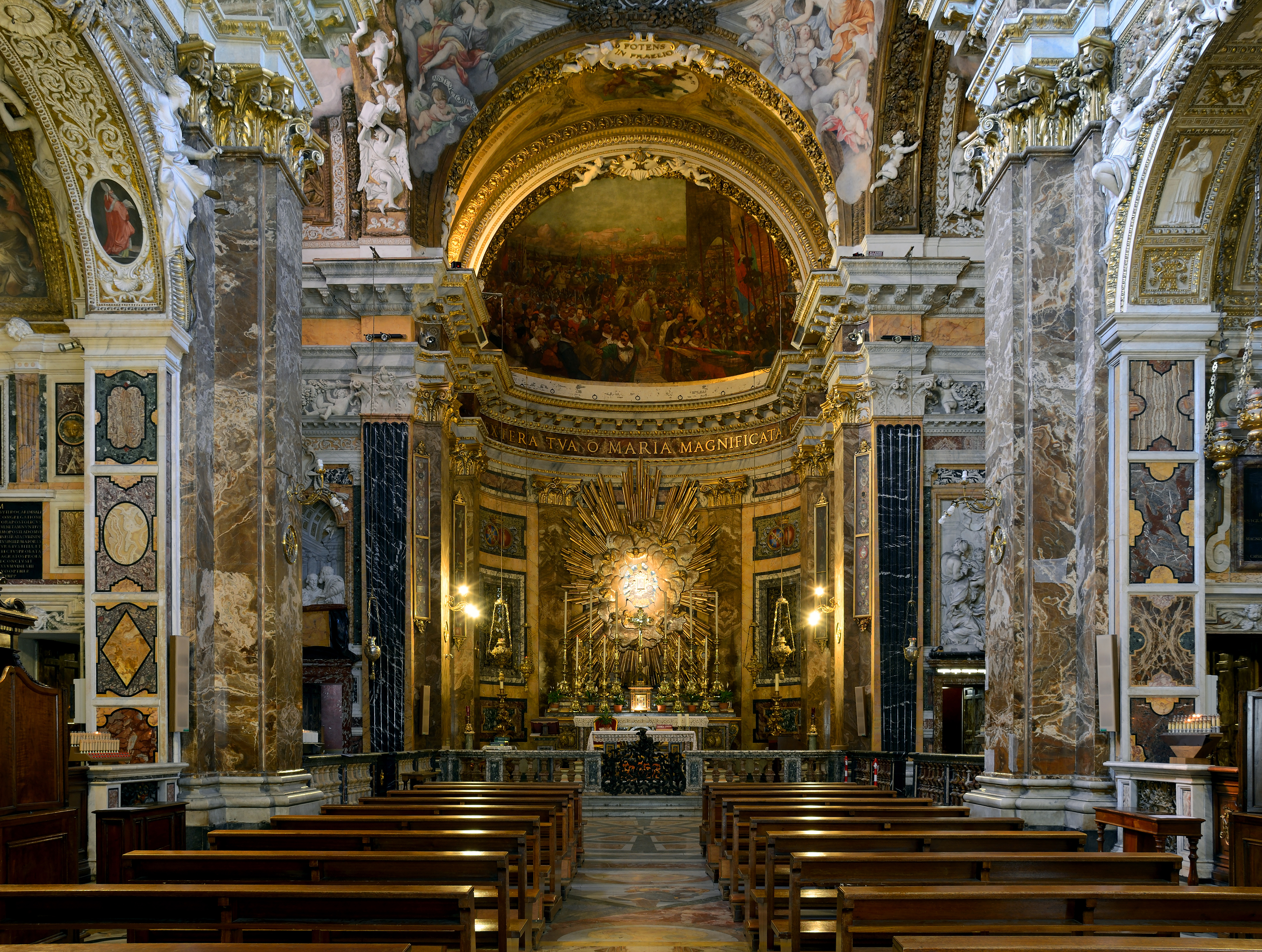
View of the interior.

Other sculptural detail abounds: The Dream of Joseph (left transept, Domenico Guidi, flanked by relief panels by Pierre Etienne Monnot) and the funeral monument to Cardinal Berlinghiero Gessi. There are paintings by Guercino, Domenichino, and Nicolas Lorrain. The church is also the final resting place of Saint Victoria, whose preserved remains are on display inside.

=== Cornaro Chapel ===
The Cornaro Chapel is a private chapel commissioned by Federico Cornaro to Baroque sculptor Gian Lorenzo Bernini. Bernini lost papal patronage following the death of Pope Urban VIII and his replacement by Pope Innocent X, who disliked his artistic style, which enabled his commissioning by private patrons at this accomplished stage in his career. The entire architectural and sculptural ensemble of the chapel was designed by Bernini.

The altarpiece of the Cornaro Chapel, the Ecstasy of St. Teresa, is among the most celebrated works of all of Baroque sculpture, and widely considered one of Bernini's masterpieces. The statues depict a moment as described by Saint Teresa of Avila in her autobiography, where she had the vivid vision of a Seraph piercing her heart with a golden shaft, causing her both immense joy and pain. The flowing robes and contorted posture abandon classical restraint and repose to depict a more passionate, almost voluptuous trance. Although artistically a tour de force, nonetheless, during Bernini's lifetime and in the centuries following, the Ecstasy of St. Teresa was accused by diverse critics for crossing a line of decency by sexualizing the visual depiction of the saint's experience, to a degree that no artist, before or after Bernini, dared to do: in depicting her at an impossibly young chronological age, as an idealized delicate beauty, in a semi-prostrate position with her mouth open and her legs splayed-apart, her wimple coming undone, with prominently displayed bare feet (Discalced Carmelites, for modesty, always wore sandals with heavy stockings) and with the seraph "undressing" her by (unnecessarily) parting her mantle to penetrate her heart with his arrow.

== Titulus ==
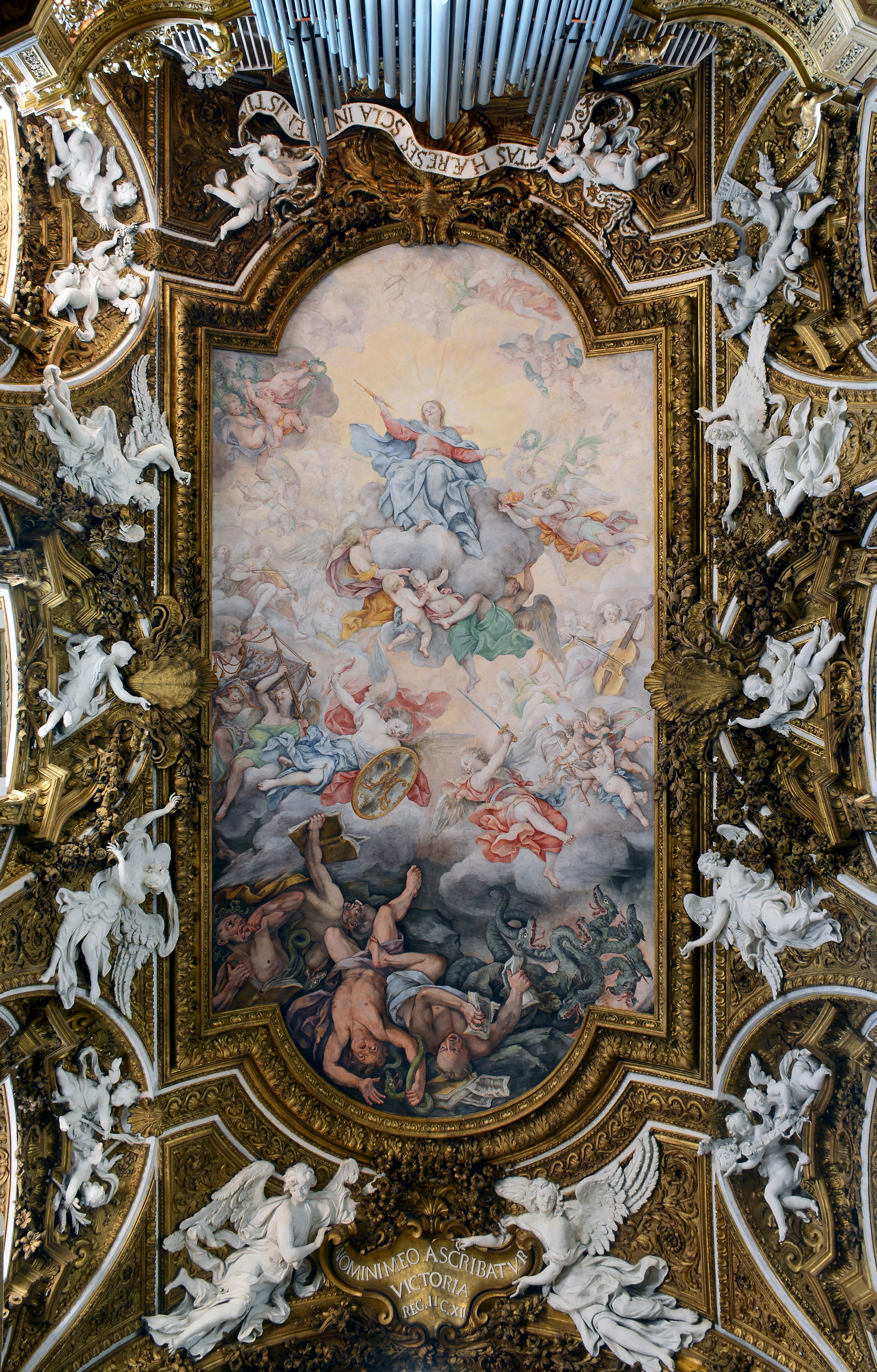
The Virgin Mary Triumphing over Heresy and Fall of the Rebel Angels, in the vault

Santa Maria della Vittoria was established as a titular church by Pope Pius VII on 23 December 1801. The following is a list of its Cardinal-Priests:

- Michelangelo Luchi (1801–1802)
- Joseph Fesch (1803–1822); in commendam (1822–1839)
- Ferdinando Maria Pignatelli (1839–1853)
- Adriano Fieschi (1853–1858)
- Joseph Othmar von Rauscher (1858–1875)
- Godefroy Brossais-Saint-Marc (1876–1878)
- Louis-Edouard-François-Desiré Pie (1879–1880)
- Luigi Jacobini (1880–1887)
- Elzéar-Alexandre Taschereau (1887–1898)
- Giovanni Battista Casali del Drago (1899–1908)
- François-Marie-Anatole de Rovérié de Cabrières (1911–1921)
- Alexis-Armand Charost (1922–1930)
- Angelo Maria Dolci (1933–1936)
- Federico Tedeschini (1936–1951)
- Giuseppe Siri (1953–1989)
- Giuseppe Caprio (1990–2005)
- Seán Patrick O'Malley, OFM Cap (2006–incumbent)
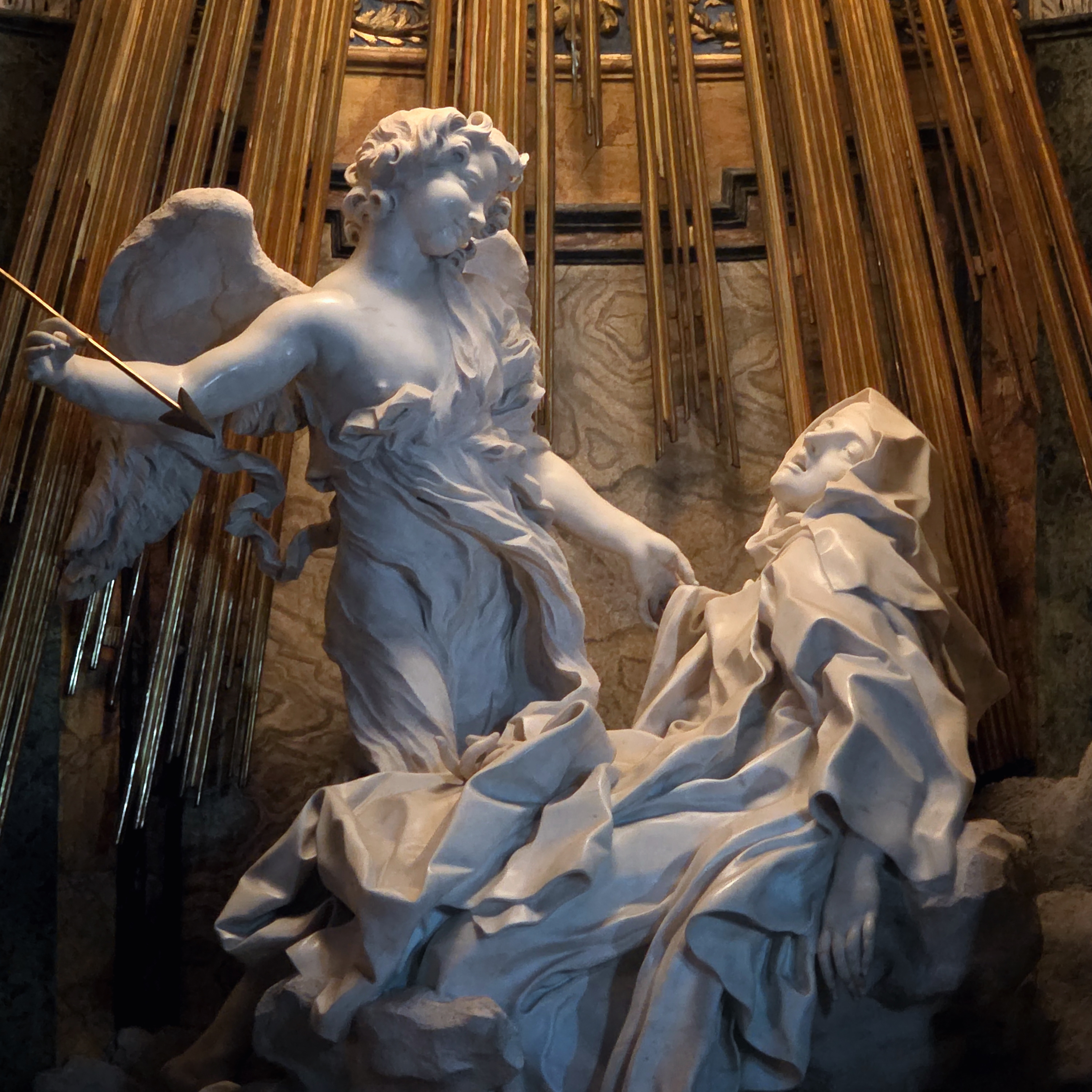
Close up of Bernini's Ecstasy of St. Teresa

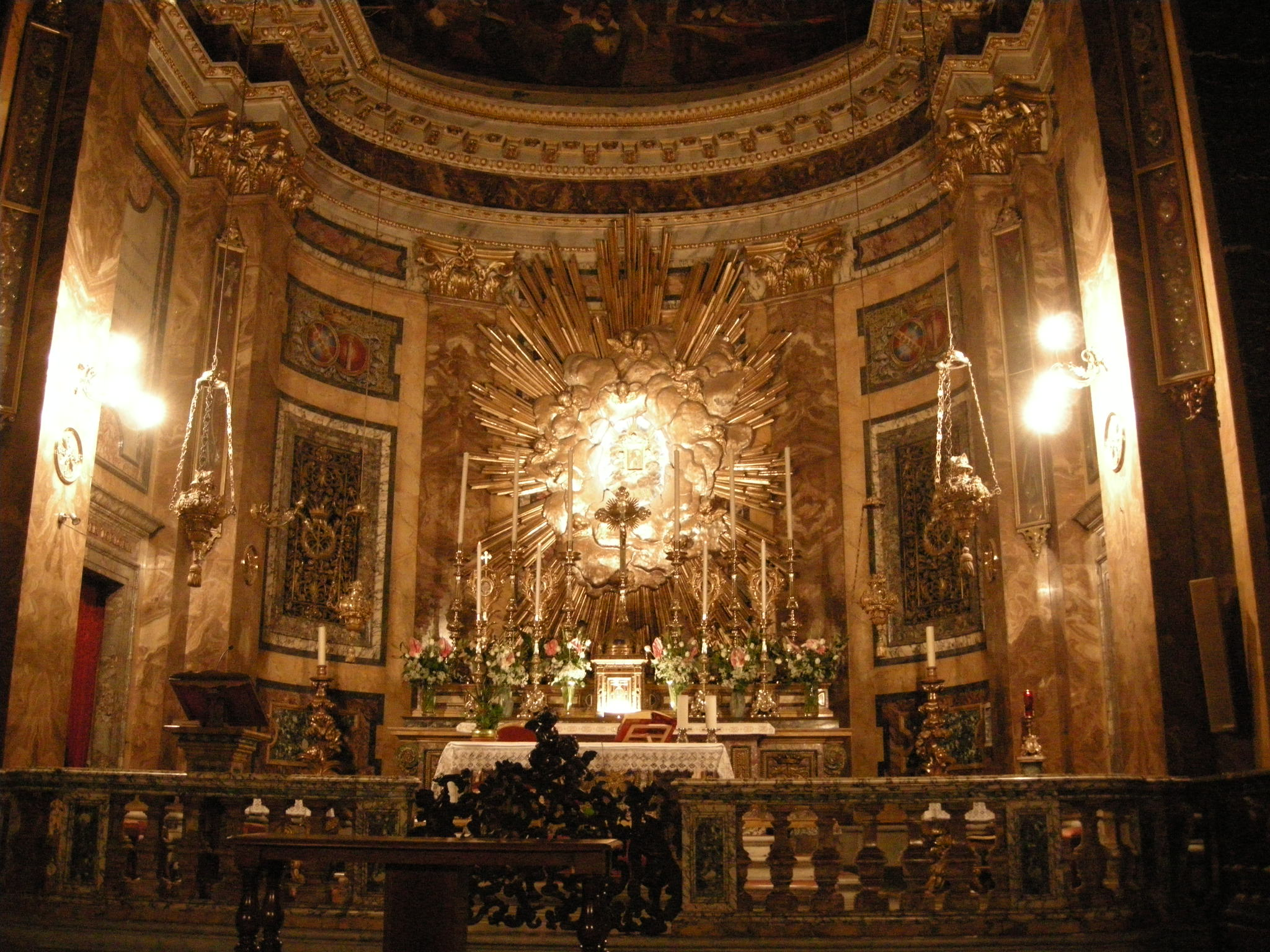

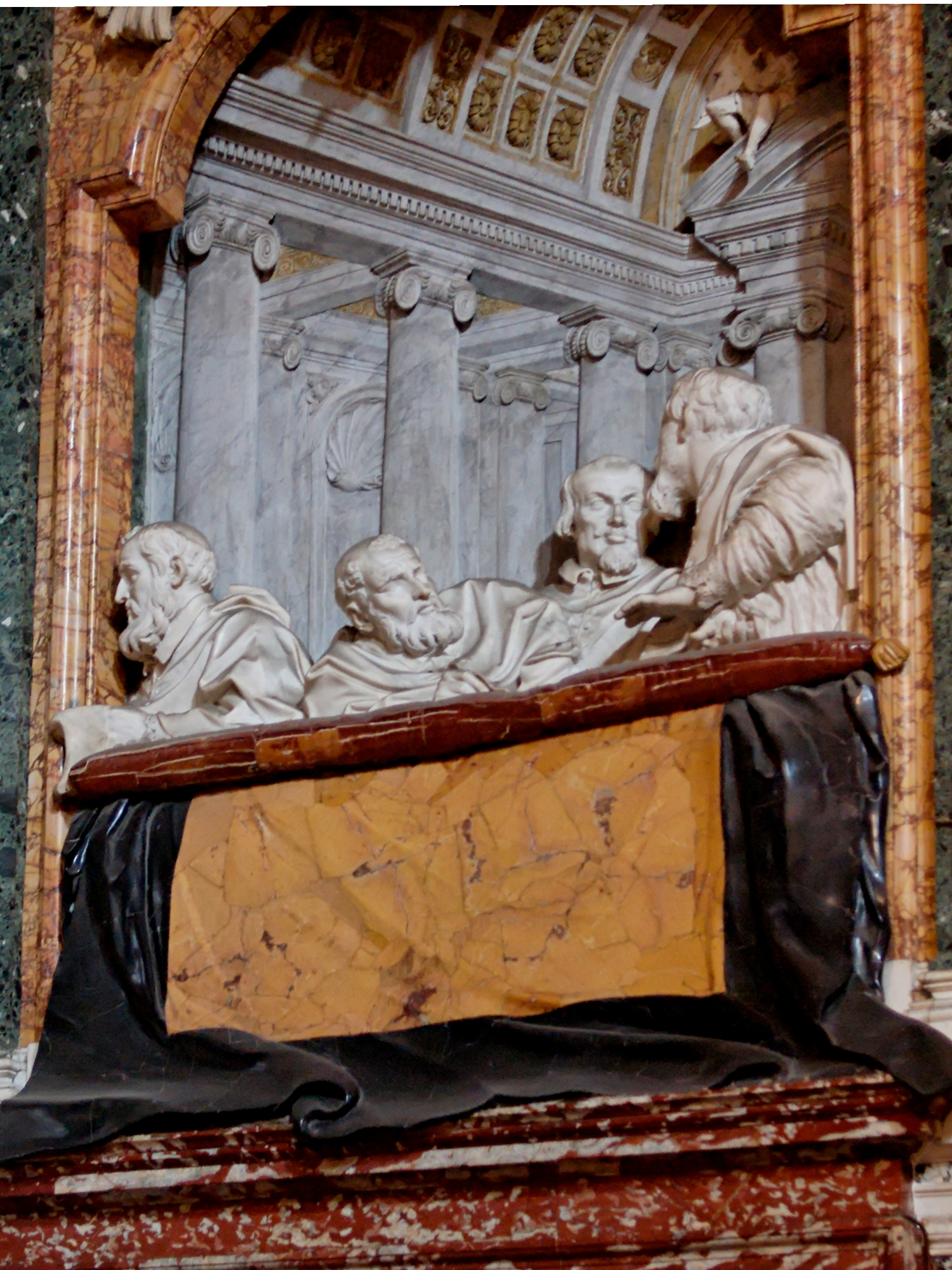

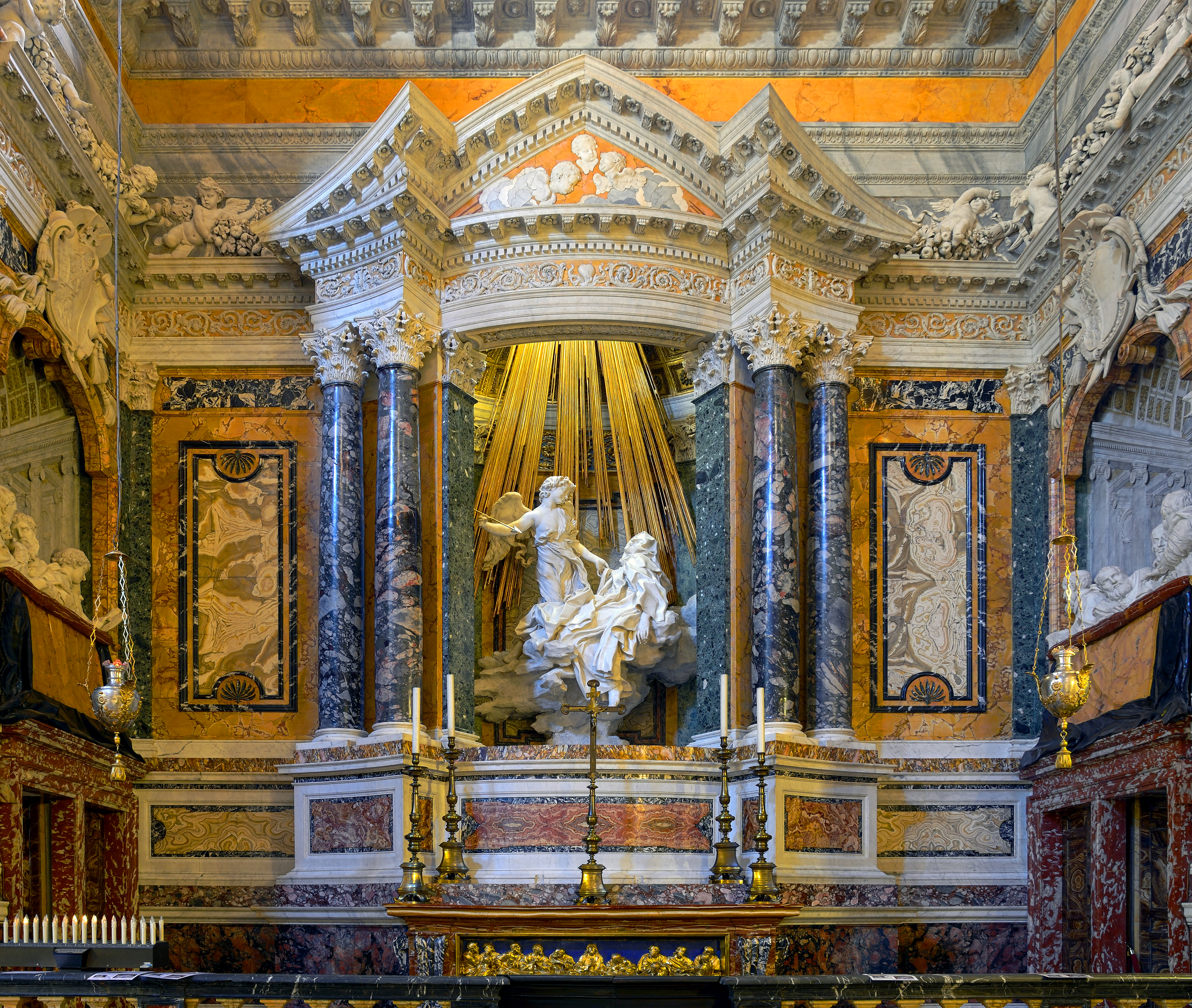

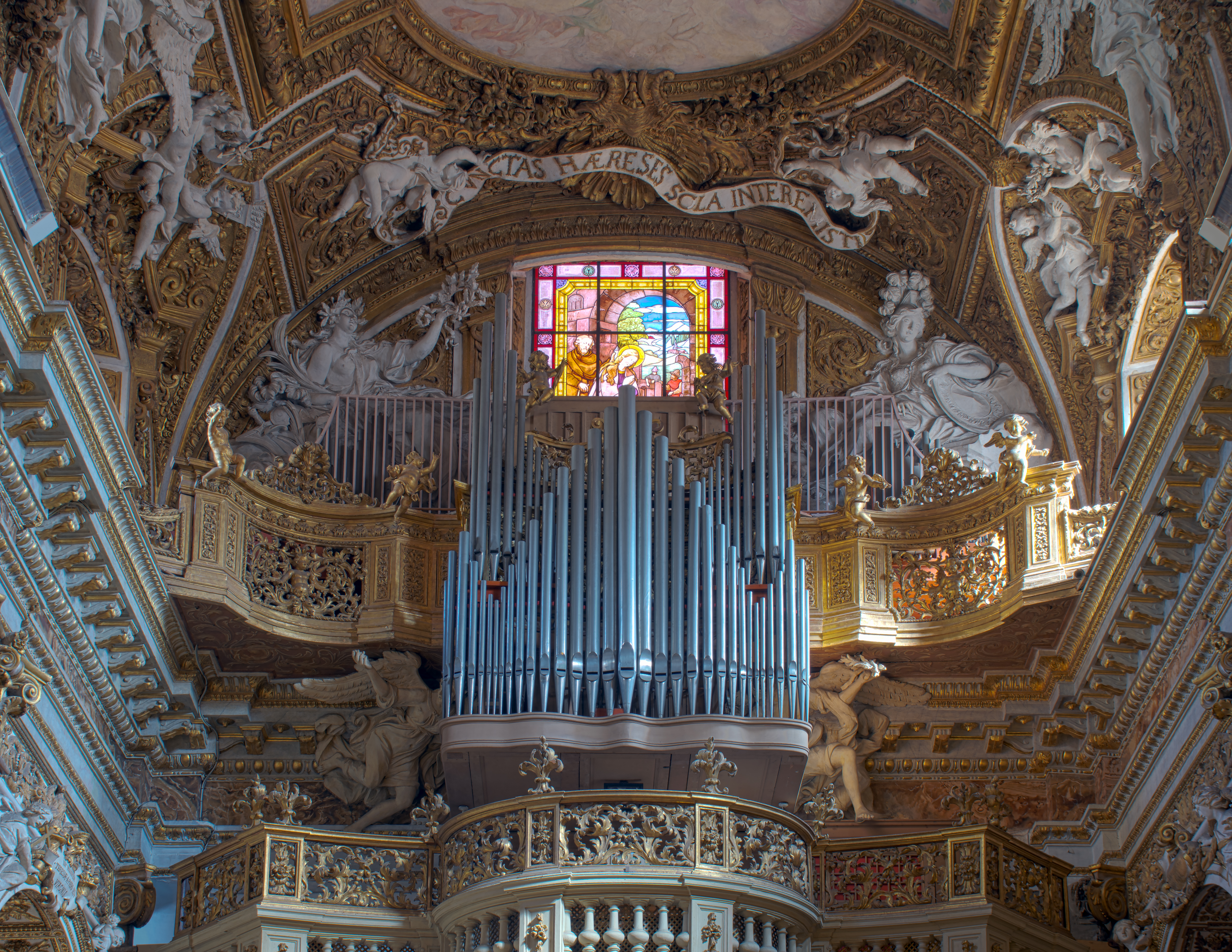

== Sources ==
- Rendina, Claudio (1999). Enciclopedia di Roma. Rome: Newton Compton.
- Matthiae, Guglielmo (1999). The Church of Santa Maria della Vittoria. Rome: Order of the Discalced Carmelite Fathers. ISBN 978-88-86542-86-9.
- Sturm, Saverio (2015). L’architettura dei Carmelitani Scalzi in età barocca: La ‘Provincia Romana’. Lazio, Umbria e Marche (1597-1705). Roma: Gangemi Editore.
- Hibbert, Howard (1965). Bernini. New York: Pelican-Penguin.
- Susanne Juliane Warma (1981). A Study of the Iconography of Bernini's Cornaro Chapel in Santa Maria Della Vittoria Athens: University of Georgia.
- G. Matthiae (1965). S. Maria della Vittoria. Rome.
- Francesco Gui, Tomáš Parma, Andrea Trenta, eds. Santa Maria della Vittoria. Una testimonianza fondamentale della storia europea (3 vols.). Roma, Veat Tipografica, 2024. ISBN 978-88-99773-08-3

| Preceded by Santa Maria in Via Lata | Landmarks of Rome; Santa Maria della Vittoria, Rome | Succeeded by San Martino ai Monti |
