= San Carlo ai Catinari =

- Chiesa di Santi Biagio e Carlo ai Catinari
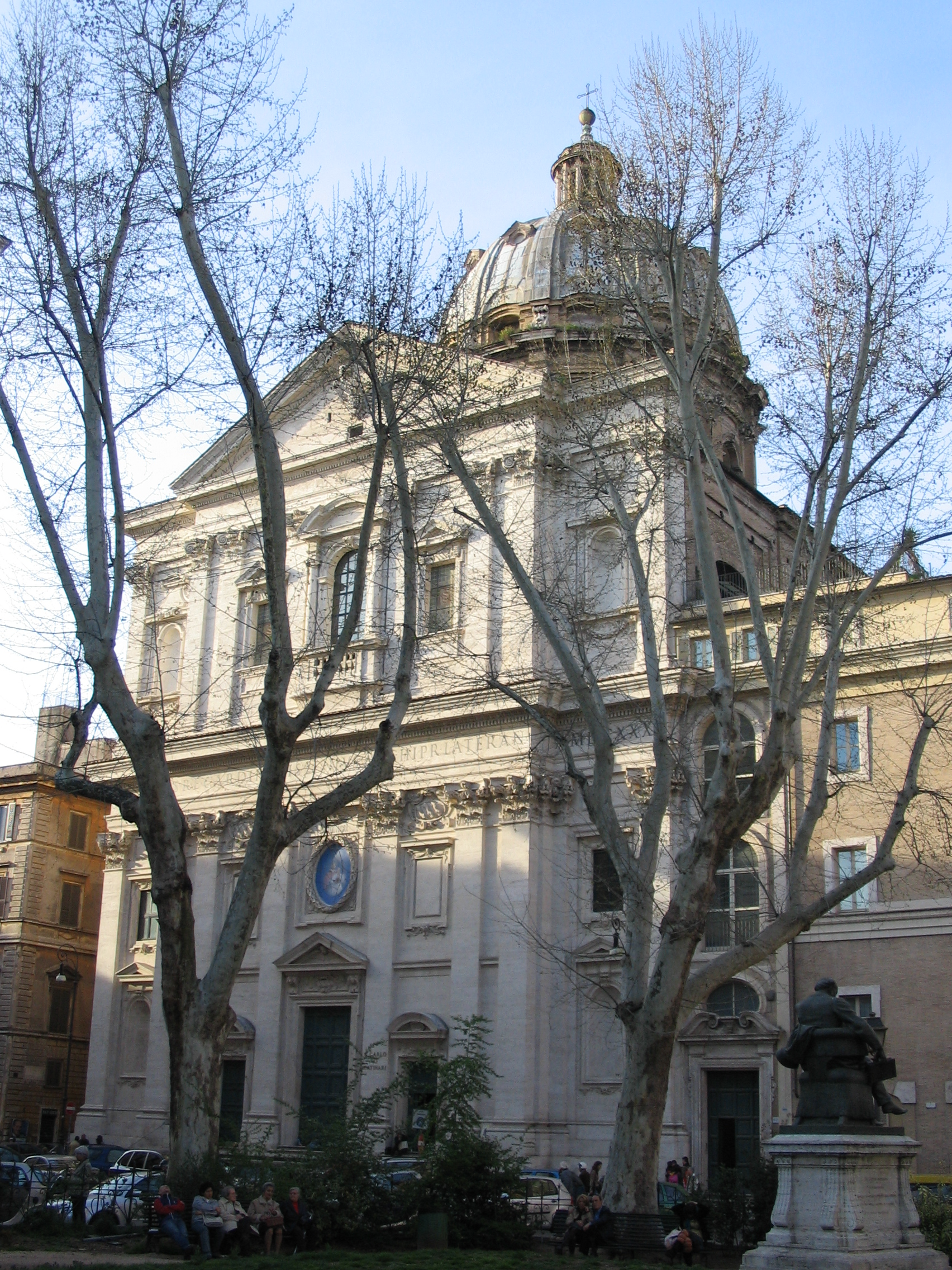
- Facade
- Click on the map for a fullscreen view
- 41°53′39.1″N 12°28′30.9″E
- Location: Piazza Benedetto Cairoli, Rome
- Country: Italy
- Denomination: Roman Catholic
- Tradition: Roman Rite
- Religious institute: Barnabites

History
- Status: Titular church
- Dedication: Saint Blaise and Saint Charles Borromeo

Architecture
- Architect(s): Rosato Rosati, Giovanni Battista Soria
- Architectural type: Church
- Completed: 1638

Administration
- Province: Diocese of Rome

San Carlo ai Catinari, also called Santi Biagio e Carlo ai Catinari ("Saints Blaise and Charles at the Bowl-Makers"), is an early-Baroque style church in Rome, Italy. It is located on Piazza Benedetto Cairoli, 117 just off the corner of Via Arenula and Via dei Falegnami, a few blocks south of the church of Sant'Andrea della Valle.

The attribute ai Catinari refers to the presence, at the time of its construction, of the many makers of wooden basins (Italian catini) who worked in the area. The church was commissioned by the Order of the Barnabites and funded by the Milanese community in Rome to honour their fellow Milanese St. Charles Borromeo (Italian: San Carlo). It is one of at least three Roman churches dedicated to him (including San Carlo al Corso and San Carlo alle Quattro Fontane) and one of a number of great 17th century preaching churches built by Counter-Reformation orders in the Centro Storico (the others being The Gesù and Sant'Ignazio of the Jesuits, Sant'Andrea della Valle of the Theatines, and the Chiesa Nuova of the Oratorians).

== History ==
The Barnabites in Milan had had close ties to Cardinal Borromeo. He had helped draft the order's constitutions, and they had assisted in ministering during the plague of 1576. When their little church of San Biagio all'Anello in Rome had become too small, they purchased adjoining land and constructed a larger one. Borromeo had been canonized in November 1610. Construction began in September 1611 making this the first church in Rome dedicated to him. In 1618 S. Biagio's was razed, and the new name was formally conferred on the parish.

== Architecture ==
The main design was by Rosato Rosati between 1612 and 1620, at the private expense of Cardinal Giambattista Leni. The travertine façade was designed by Giovanni Battista Soria and construction occurred in 1635–38. The dome is one of the largest in the city.

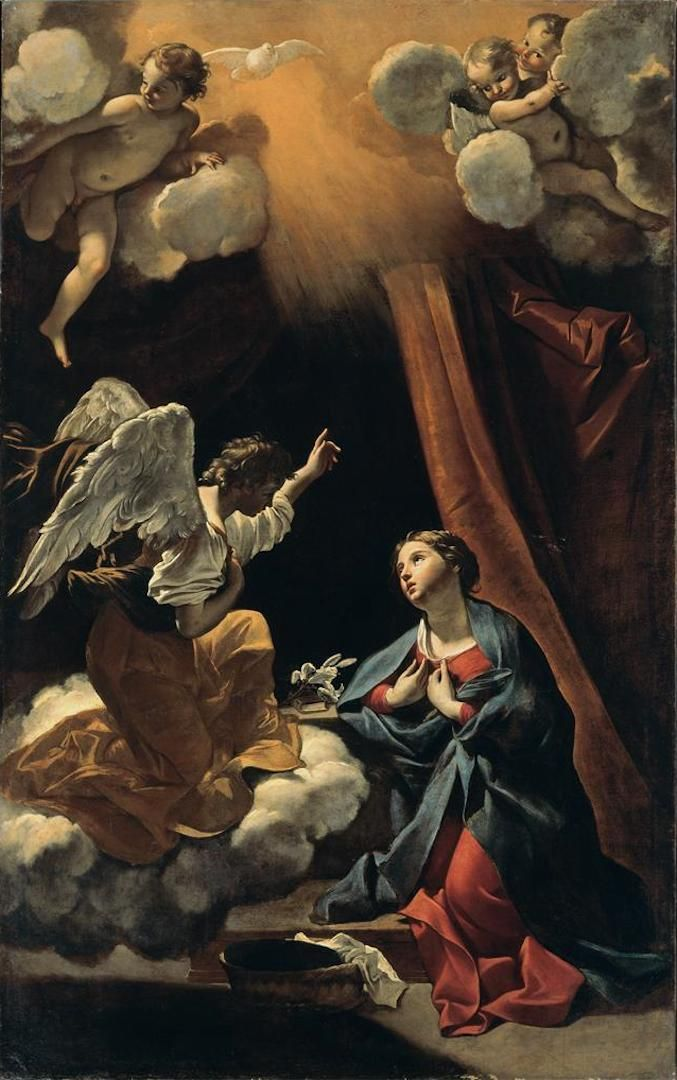
Annunciazione - Lanfranco (Catinari)

== Interior ==
The interior has yellow scagliola pilasters. The pendentives of the cupola are frescoed with the Cardinal Virtues (1627–30) by Domenichino who designed the stucco decoration in the dome and probably the other main vaults. Giovanni Giacomo Semenza had originally been given the commission and threatened to sue. Shortly after finishing the work, Domenichino left for Naples.

The pavement is of inlaid marble. In the choir is the fresco of S. Carlo Borromeo in Glory; executed in 1646–1647, this is the last painting by Giovanni Lanfranco. Directly behind the high altar is the oil painting of S. Carlo carrying the Holy Nail in Procession during the Plague by Pietro da Cortona. The high altar itself was designed by Martino Longhi the Younger. On the entrance wall are frescoes by Gregorio and Mattia Preti, showing episodes from the Life of Saint Charles (1642).

To the right of the High Altar is an architecturally inventive late-Baroque chapel designed by Antonio Gherardi and built 1695–1700. The view upwards is through an oculus surrounded by angels in the centre of a dark shallow dome, to a rectangular light-filled room above illuminated by windows which are not visible from below. In addition, he painted the altarpiece of S. Cecilia in the chapel. Gherardi also designed the equally inventive Avila Chapel in Santa Maria in Trastevere.

The first chapel on the right has an Annunciation (1624) by Lanfranco; in the second chapel, there is a Martyrdom of San Biagio by Giacinto Brandi. The second chapel on the left has an altarpiece depicting the Death of Saint Anne by Andrea Sacchi. Adjoining this chapel, on the southwest pier is a monument of Cardinal Gerdil, a Barnabite theologian buried in the church.

The third chapel was designed by Paolo Maruscelli with frescoes of the Persian Martyrdoms (1641) by Giovan Francesco Romanelli and lunettes by Giacinto Gimignani.

The passage behind the High Altar has canvases depicting St. Charles in Prayer (1620) by Guido Reni and St. Charles by Andrea Commodi, as well as a Miracle of St. Blaise (1669) by Cerrini. The bronze crucifix in the sacristy is attributed to Alessandro Algardi and Christ Derided (1598) by Cavalier D'Arpino.

The church contains some notable relics, including the skull of St. Febronia of Nisibis, moved here from the old church of St. Paul after the latter was demolished for the construction of Palazzo Chigi. This relic, kept together with two other skulls of saints, is visible in the fenestella confessionis altar.

== Cardinals ==
Cardinal priests

Between 1616, and 1627, San Carlo ai Catinari was a titular church. The following cardinals held the title:

- Ottavio Belmosto (17 October 1616 – 16 November 1618)
- Luigi Capponi (5 May 1621 – 2 May 1622, then Cardinal Priest of San Pietro in Vincoli)
- Giovanni Delfino (23 August 1622 – 25 November 1622)

Cardinal deacons

Pope John XXIII established the titular deaconry on 2 December 1959. The following cardinals have held this title:

- Arcadio Larraona Saralegui, C.M.F. (14 December 1959 - 28 April 1969, then Cardinal Priest of Sacro Cuore di Maria)
- Luigi Raimondi (5 March 1973 - 24 June 1975)
- Giuseppe Maria Sensi (24 May 1976 - 22 June 1987, then Cardinal Priest of Regina Apostolorum)
- Angelo Felici (28 June 1988 - 17 June 2007)
- Leonardo Sandri (24 November 2007 – 28 June 2018)
  - As cardinal bishop from 28 June 2018.
