= Giovanni Battista Montano =

Giovanni Battista Montano, from the Lives of the Artists by Giorgio Vasari

Giovanni Battista Montano (1534–1621) was an Italian architect, designer and engraver of primary importance as a recorder of Antique Roman architectural remains.

== Early life ==
Montano was born in Milan and trained primarily as a sculptor and a wood carver. In particular he has done two great carved works in the Basilica of San Giovanni in Laterano and the Church of Santa Maria di Loreto. In the early 1570s, Montano relocated to Rome, where he intensely studied the city’s antique monuments and ruins.

Montano was a member of the Accademia di San Luca, and in 1602 he was commissioned by the Carpenters' guild to oversee the completion of the Church of San Giuseppe dei Falegnami, the construction of which had already begun in 1597. Montano designed the façade of the church, but his death in 1621 meant that the work had to be continued by his pupil Giovanni Battista Soria. Numerous wooden furnishings inside the church confirm the craftsmanship of Montano and his workshop.

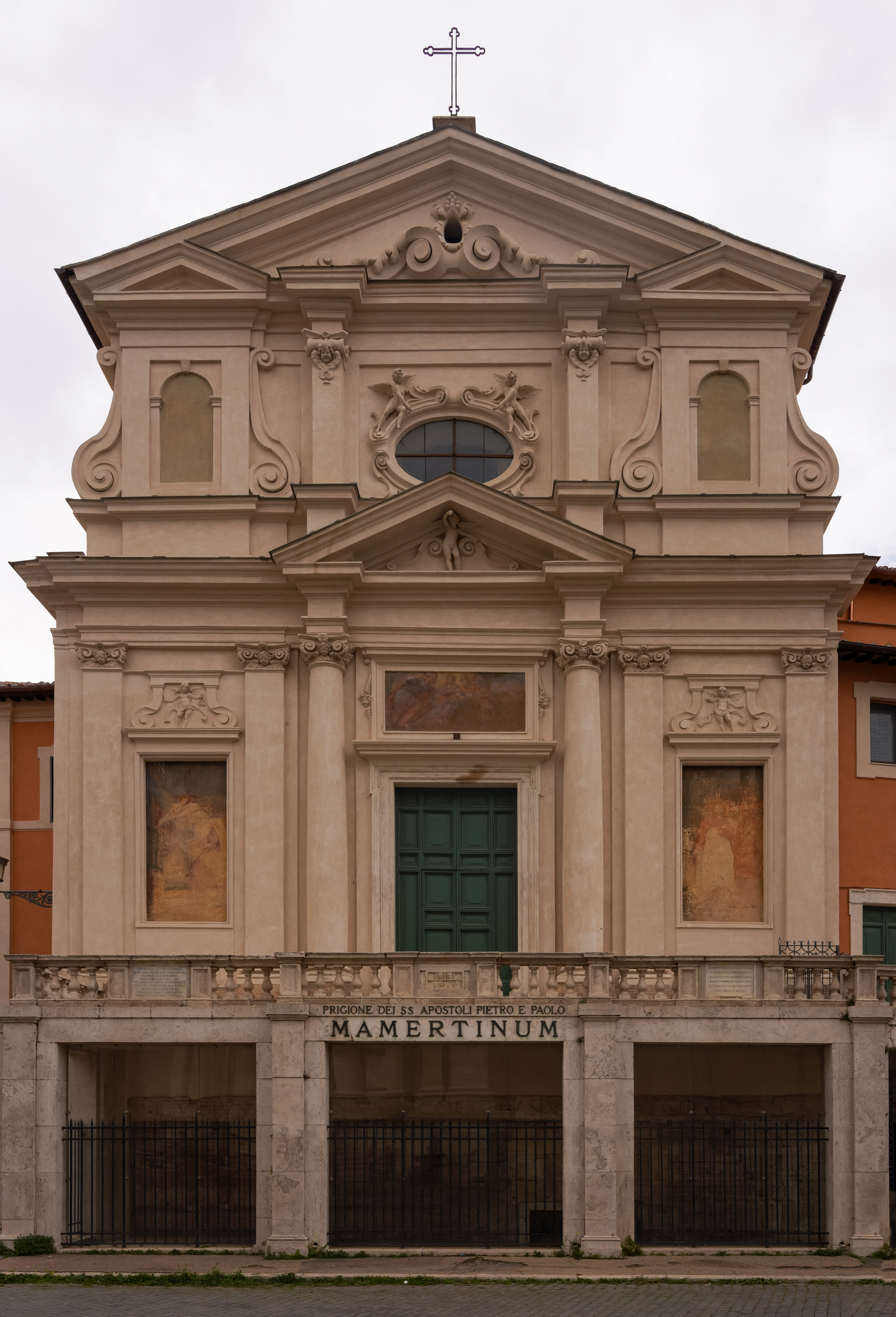
Façade of the San Giuseppe dei Falegnami

== Works ==
Although Montano carried out several sculptural and architectural projects during his time in Rome, his reputation is primarily due to his work as a designer and researcher of ancient architecture. By drawing from the ancient ruins, Montano intended to reconstruct the original appearance of Rome, creating fantastic designs unrelated to the classical sixteenth-century buildings of Rome. While not famous during his lifetime, Montano’s drawings of ancient architecture became widely circulated when they were made into engraving by his pupil G. B. Soria and published in 1624 as Scielta di varii tempietti antichi (Selection of Various Antique Temples). His other works include:

- Diversi ornamenti capricciosi per depositi o altari (Different Capricious Ornaments for Reliquaries or Altars—1625)
- Tabernacoli diversi (Various Shrines—1628)
- Architettura con diversi ornamenti cavati dall' antico (Architecture with Various Ornaments taken from the Antique—1636).

== Legacy ==
Montano's work influenced some of the most important Baroque artists of Rome, including Francesco Borromini, Gian Lorenzo Bernini, and Pietro da Cortona. His influence can be seen in Cortona's Santi Luca e Martina (1634–69) and in the façade of Bernini's Sant'Andrea al Quirinale (1658–70).

The architecture of the sixteenth century had based their principles on the study of Vitruvius and certain carefully selected examples of Roman architecture. The fact that the fantastical and ornamental nature of Montano’s reconstructions were largely based on imagination rather than archaeological or historical accuracy, did not lessen their importance, as they were taken at face value by seventeenth-century architects, and were regarded as reliable reconstructions of Ancient Roman buildings. Bernini in particular, was attracted by exquisitely carved bases and capitals of the Augustan and Flavian periods from the Codex Coner, imperial buildings at Hadrian's Villa at Tivoli, and others which have not survived.

=== Influence on Borromini ===
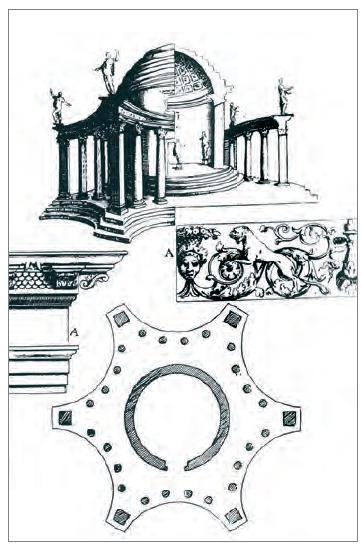
Engraving taken from Montano's drawings depicting the reconstruction of the ancient Roman Temple of Vesta in Tivoli.

Borromini also knew and used ancient models. Baalbek, Petra, Sabratha and Leptis Magna are the finest examples of the late Imperial architecture in the Eastern Empire admired by Borromini. Some of them have elements almost identical in plan with Borromini’s designs. But he certainly could have not known those buildings, because those ancient monuments were buried under sand till the twentieth century. It is likely that more buildings of this kind existed in or near Rome in the seventeenth century that is now shapeless masses of brickwork. It seems that Borromini relied on drawings of Montano, whose reconstructions of ancient monuments appeared in engraved form between 1624 and 1664 in a series of volumes called Li cinque libri di architettura. The original drawings were in the collection of the Roman collector and antiquarian, Cassiano dal Pozzo. These drawings provide the sources for a number of important motifs, which at first sight would not suggest any connection with ancient architecture. But in details they reproduce monuments that correspond closely to works by Borromini. For instance, there is a striking similarity between the lantern of Borromini’s Sant'Ivo alla Sapienza and the ancient temple of Baalbek, a building Borromini could not have known.

Montano's designs of archaeological reconstructions had a great influence throughout Europe and lasted until the eighteenth century.

Engraving taken from Montano's drawings depicting the reconstruction of the ancient Roman Temple of Vesta in Tivoli.
