= San Giuseppe dei Falegnami =

- Church of Saint Joseph of the Carpenters
- San Giuseppe a Campo Vaccino
- Chiesa di San Giuseppe dei Falegnami
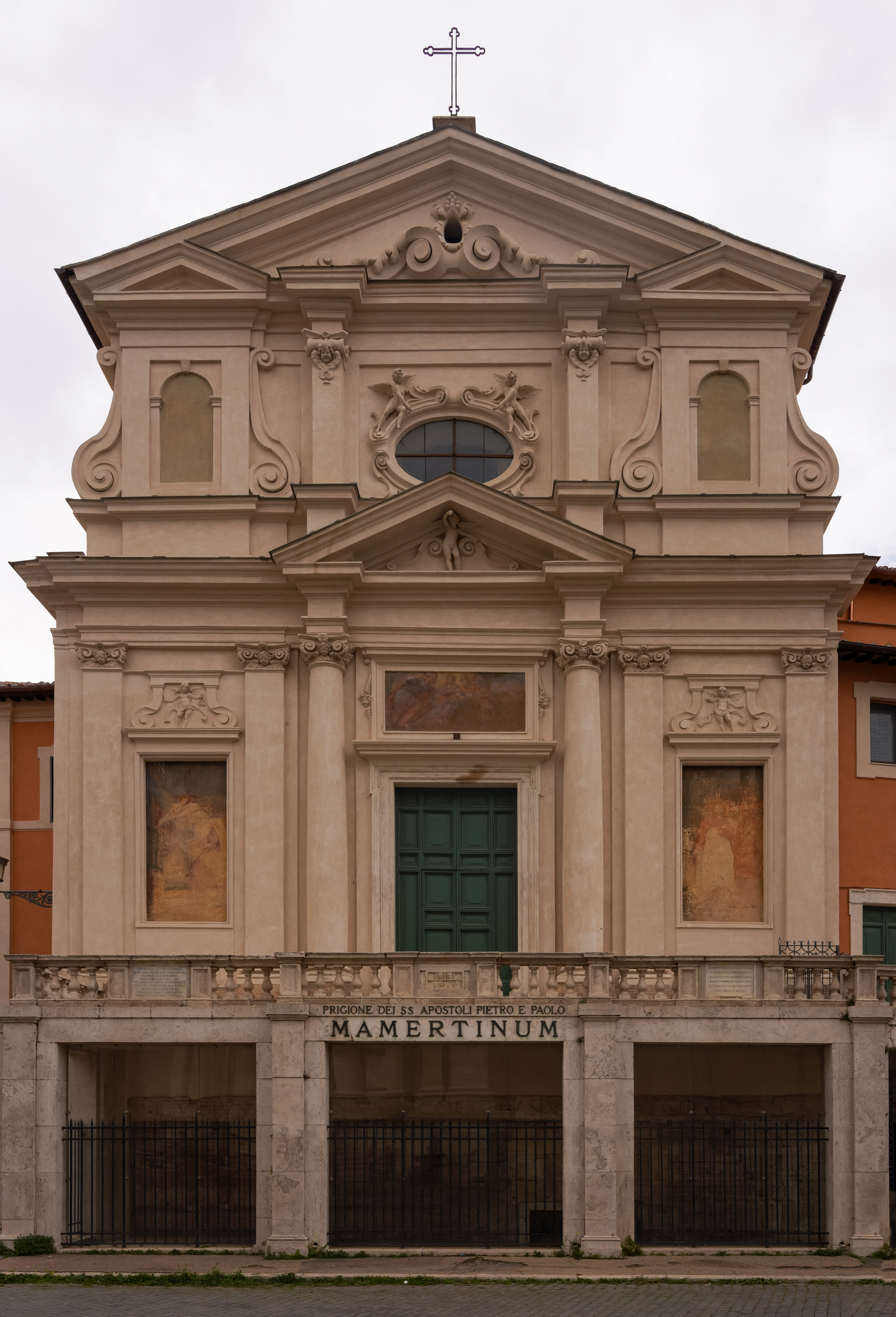
- Facade
- Click on the map for a fullscreen view
- 41°53′35″N 12°29′04″E
- Location: Clivo Argentario 1, Rome
- Country: Italy
- Language: Italian
- Denomination: Catholic
- Tradition: Roman Rite
- Website: sangiuseppedeifalegnami.org

History
- Status: titular church
- Dedication: Saint Joseph
- Consecrated: 11 November 1663

Architecture
- Functional status: titular church
- Architect: Giacomo Della Porta
- Style: Baroque
- Groundbreaking: 1597
- Completed: 1663

Administration
- Diocese: Rome

San Giuseppe dei Falegnami (Italian, "St. Joseph of the Carpenters"), also called San Giuseppe a Campo Vaccino ("St. Joseph at the Cowfield", an old name for the Roman Forum), is a Roman Catholic church located next to the Roman Forum in Rome, Italy.

In the 11th-century, the Santi Pietro e Paolo in Carcere (St. Peter & St. Paul in Prison) Church was built here over the Mamertine Prison, which by legend was the incarceration site of Saint Peter and Saint Paul. In 1540, the Congregation of the Carpenters obtained authorization to build a new church here upon the ruins of the Santi Pietro e Paolo in Carcere Church. By 1597, work began on a new (current) church dedicated to the patron saint of carpenters, St. Joseph. The initial architect was Giacomo della Porta. At his death (1602), the work was continued by Giovanni Battista Montano who designed the façade. At his death (1621), the work was continued by his pupil Giovanni Battista Soria. The San Giuseppe dei Falegnami Church was completed in 1663 by Antonio Del Grande (1607-1679), and it was consecrated on November 11, 1663.

In 1853, the Chapel of the Crucifix was built between the church’s floor and the prison's ceiling. The church was restored in 1886 with the construction of a new apse. In the 1930s, the façade was raised above the floor to allow direct access to the Mamertine Prison below. The interior has a nave with two side chapels that were decorated in the nineteenth century. Among the paintings is Nativity (1651) by Carlo Maratta. Next to the church is an oratory, with a wooden ceiling. The Chapel of the Crucifix is located between the church's floor and the Mamertine Prison's ceiling. It became a titular church on February 18, 2012 and received its first Cardinal-Deacon.

- Francesco Coccopalmerio (February 18, 2012 – present)

On August 30, 2018, two-thirds of the carved wooden ceiling fell due to a collapse of two of the four roof trusses, and it was closed to the public. During restoration, conservators found that knowledge of coffered ceiling construction methods was underdeveloped, as research had mostly focused on their artistic and historic aspects.
