= Santa Caterina a Magnanapoli =

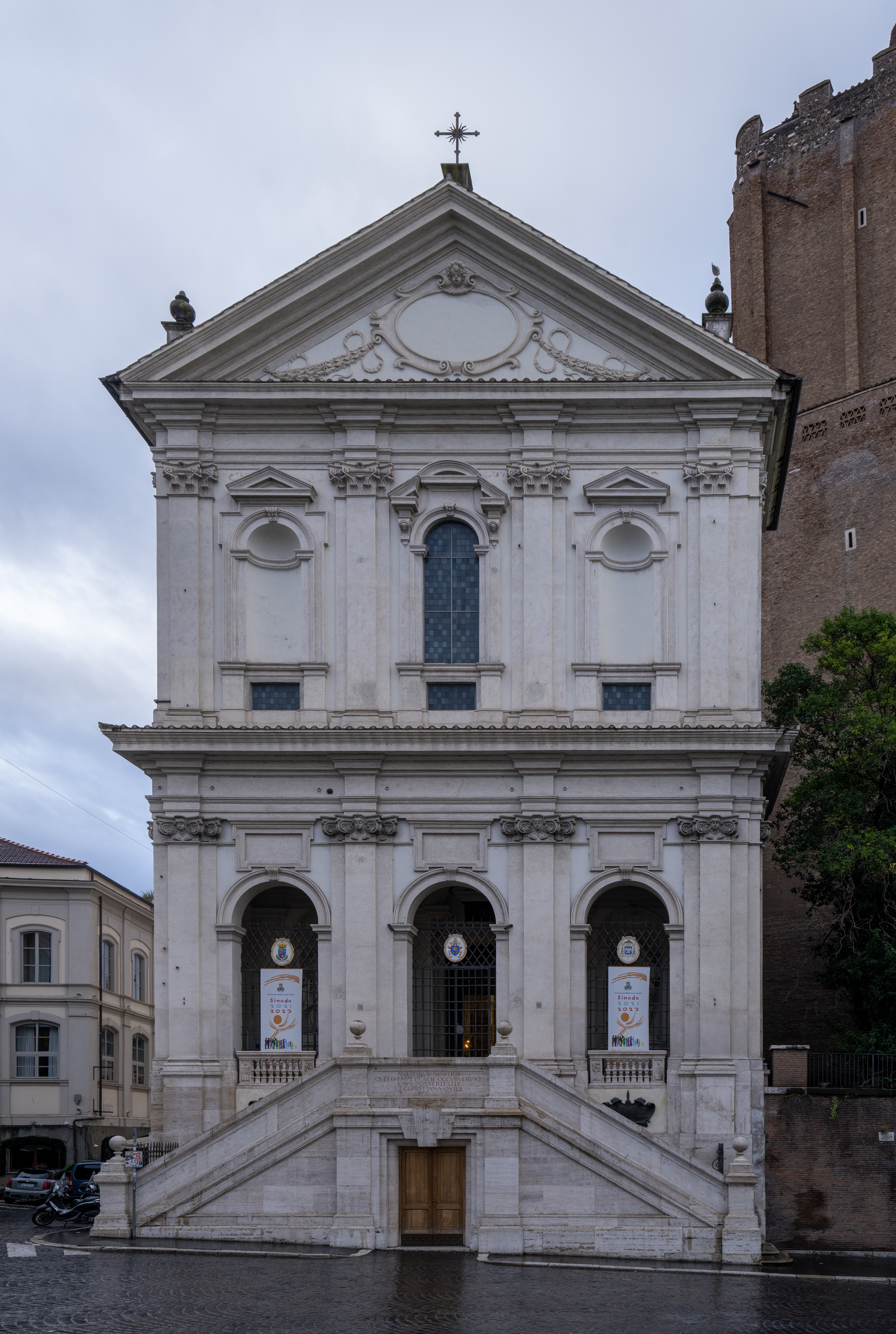
- Exterior.
- Click on the map for a fullscreen view
- 41°53′46″N 12°29′13″E
- Location: Rome
- Country: Italy
- Denomination: Roman Catholic
- Tradition: Roman Rite

History
- Dedication: Catherine of Siena

Architecture
- Architectural type: Church

Santa Caterina a Magnanapoli is a baroque church dedicated to St. Catherine of Siena on Largo Magnanapoli on the slopes of the Quirinal Hill in Rome.

== History ==
A group of Dominican tertiary nuns, living in a small house in via Santa Chiara where St. Catherine had died, were looking for larger premises. Led by Porzia Massimo whose late husband was a Conti, from 1574 they successively acquired parts of properties belonging to the Conti family at Magnanapoli to establish their convent there, financially assisted by Pope Gregory XIII. The originally small community thrived and quickly expanded from 27 nuns in 1574 to 108 in 1626, many of whom from important noble families.

The construction of a church began in 1608, initially at expense of Cardinal Scipione Borghese to a design by Carlo Maderno, but stopped in 1613. Meanwhile, the monastery acquired the Torre delle Milizie in 1619.

In 1628, the building of the current church was begun to a design by Giovanni Battista Soria. In 1631 the chancel and two adjacent chapels were completed. Building then came to a halt until the final portion of the church took shape from 1636 and concluded with the facade in 1641. The consecration of the church by cardinal Alessandro Cesarini took place in 1640.

Another Dominican nuns' convent, Santi Domenico e Sisto, is just a stone's throw away.

When the Via Nazionale was laid out in the 19th century, the street level was lowered. This raised the church entrance to a considerable height above the street. To allow access, a double staircase leading to the portico was built. Under the stairs is the entrance to the Crypt of the Fallen, constructed in 1934 and dedicated to the priests who were killed in the First World War. The crypt contains a bronze crucifix by Romano Romanelli.

Most of the convent was demolished in 1924. The Military Ordinariate, whose headquarters are adjacent to the church, took over the church, and it is now served by diocesan clergy. A restoration occurred in 1992.

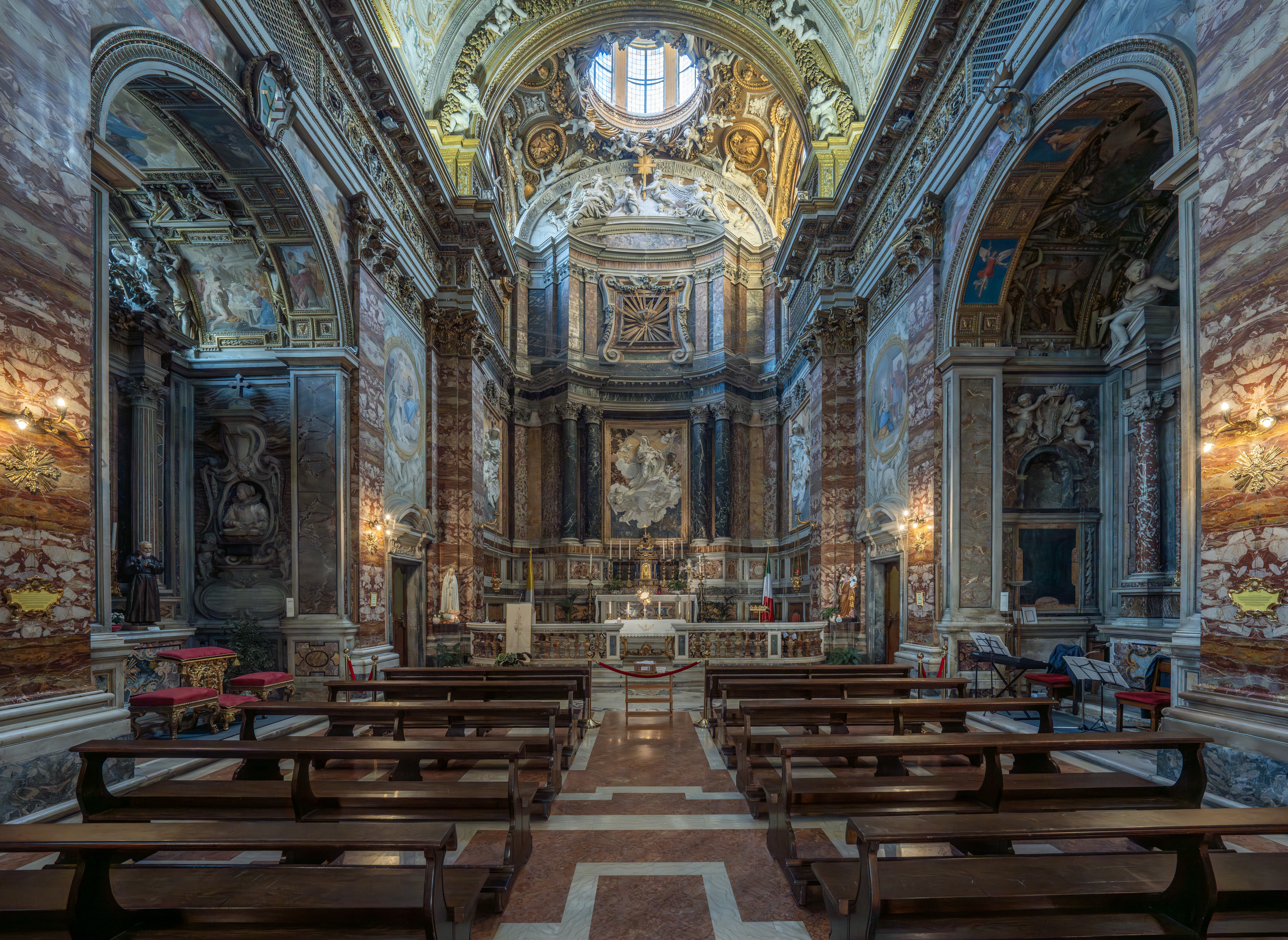
Interior.

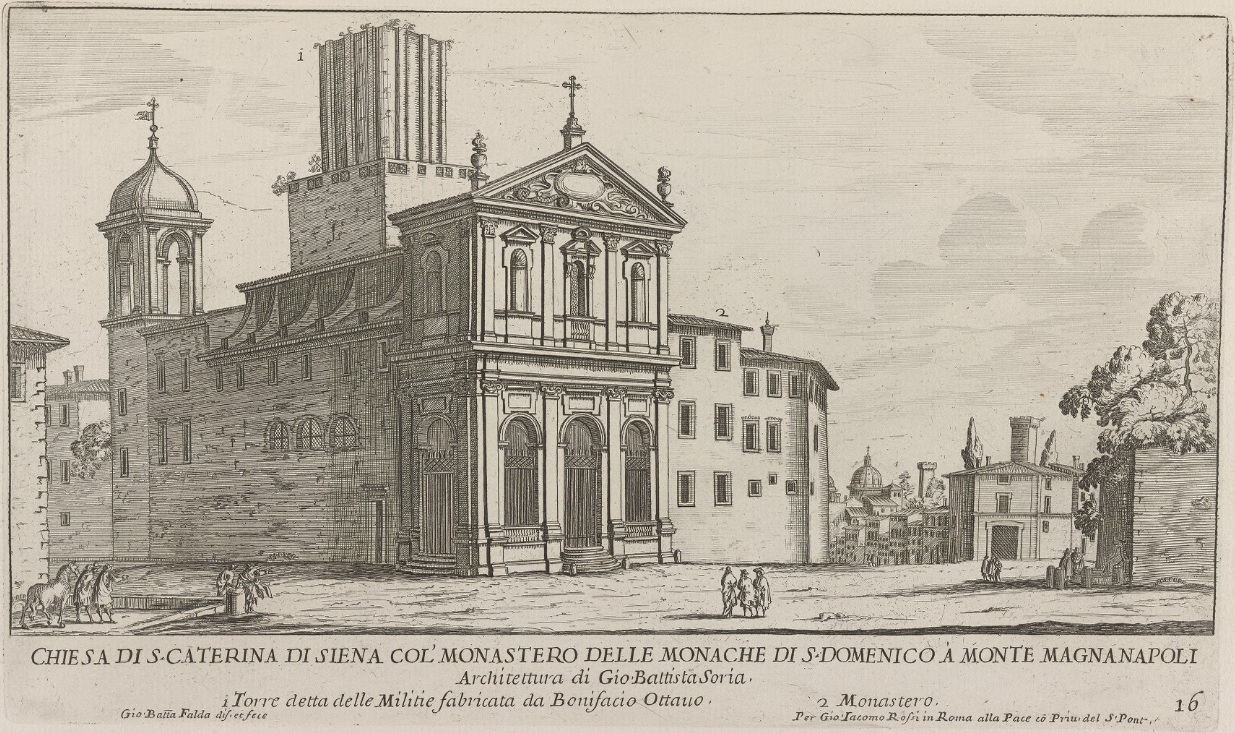
Engraving of c. 1667-1669 by Giovanni Battista Falda showing the church at the original street level.

== Interior ==
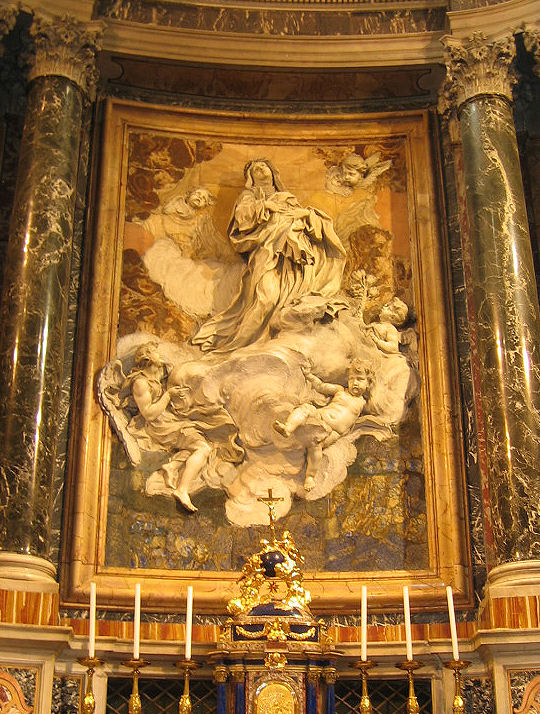
St Catherine in Ecstasy by Melchiorre Cafà.

The interior is a single nave with a barrel vault and three chapels on each side. The rich decoration, although carried out over a long period of time, appears very homogeneous.

=== Chancel ===
==== Main altar ====
The massive main altar's architecture to the design of the Maltese sculptor Melchiorre Cafà is shaped similar to church facades. It creates an elaborate frame for the large marble relief, also by Cafà and finished by the time of his untimely death in 1667, aged only 31.

The relief, St Catherine in Ecstasy, shows the saint in a very indeterminate stance on a cloud pushed by an angel and some putti, all in white marble (some of the flattest parts of the cloud are in plaster). The scene is embedded in a smooth, polychrome background which forms a concave curve through which it underlines the protagonist's statuesque appearance, seemingly detached from it. Its pieces of differently coloured marble are arranged in such a way that they suggest dematerialised dark clouds opening up to let St. Catherine ascend to heaven. With her floatingly light posture and upwards gaze this ascend seems inevitable, she seems to be drawn heavenwards.

Cafà's work is something new in Roman baroque sculpture. It incorporates lessons learned from Bernini, in particular his Memorial to Maria Raggi (1647) and the Ecstasy of St Theresa (ca. 1652) as well as the use of a polychrome marble background at the relic balconies in the pillars of the crossing of Saint Peter's (1630s). In addition, Cafà pulls together recently finished or contemporary solutions from within the workshop of Ercole Ferrata of which he himself was an essential part, in particular the Statue of St. Catherine for Siena Cathedral, St. Agnes on a Pyre and the concave shaped relief Martyrdom of Sant'Emerenziana (both in Sant'Agnese in Agone). From these ingredients and his own artistic power, Cafà produces a highly emotive pictorial solution unseen before, neither neatly definable as a relief nor as a statue nor as a picture.

==== Other works ====
In the chancel's dome are four medallions depicting Dominican saints surrounded by a multitude of putti, all possibly also by Cafà, and the fresco The Glory of the Eternal Father by Francesco Rosa in the lantern.

The decoration of the chancel was completed in the 18th century with the marble reliefs of St Rose of Lima and St Agnes of Montepulciano by Pietro Bracci on the side walls (1755).

The tabernacle in the shape of a ciborium, made from lapis lazuli, agate, and gilded bronze, and the high altar on which it sits was designed in 1785 by the architect Carlo Marchionni.

=== Nave and chapels ===
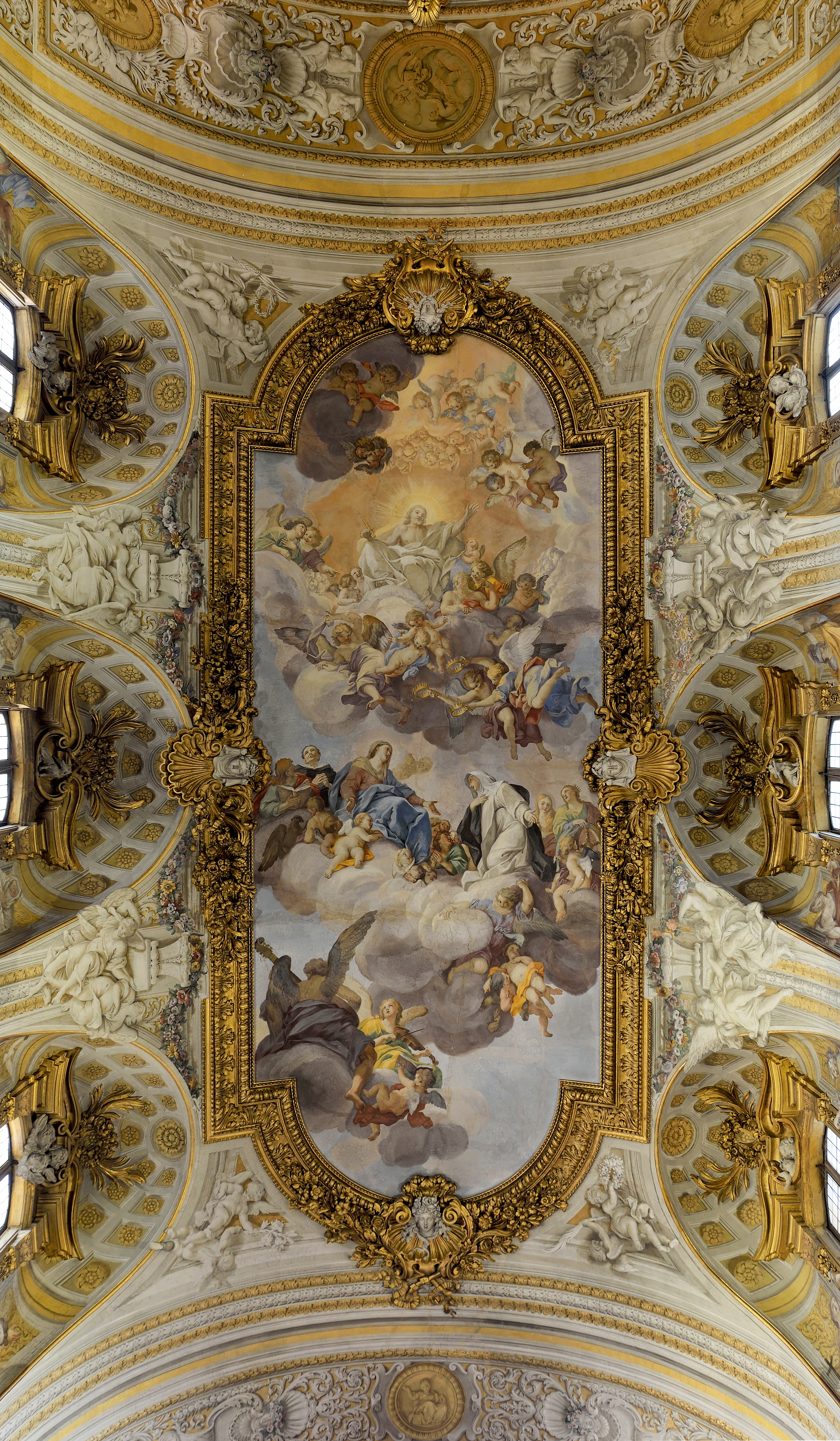
Glory of St. Catherine Fresco in the nave by Luigi Garzi

The nave's ceiling fresco, Glory of St. Catherine, one of the masterpieces of Luigi Garzi, shows St. Catherine arriving in heaven and concludes the narrative started by Cafà. It was first mentioned in 1713 and is retained by some scholars to be from around that period while others date it considerably earlier. Garzi had already painted an altarpiece with the subject All Saints in 1674 for the second chapel on the right.

This second chapel on the right was decorated in fresco from 1700-1703 by Giuseppe Passeri who also painted two other altar paintings, Three Archangels as well as Madonna of the Rosary. The latter, one of Passeri's best works, is in the third chapel on the left which also contains the tomb monuments to Giuseppe Bonanni (1648) and Virginia Primi Bonanni (1650) by Giuliano Finelli.

In the first chapel on the right, Benedetto Luti painted a fresco of Putti in the ceiling and carried out its altarpiece, Communion of St. Mary Magdalen (1706-1708).

=== Corridor ===
In the corridor leading to the sacristy are remains of frescoes by Antoniazzo Romano which came from the original house of the nuns in via St. Chiara. Some time after 1637 they became part of the room of St. Catherine in the Magnanapoli convent. When this was demolished the frescoes were relocated to this corridor. Among the saints shown are St Bridget of Sweden and St Catherine of Alexandria.
