= Giovanni Battista Soria =

Italian architect

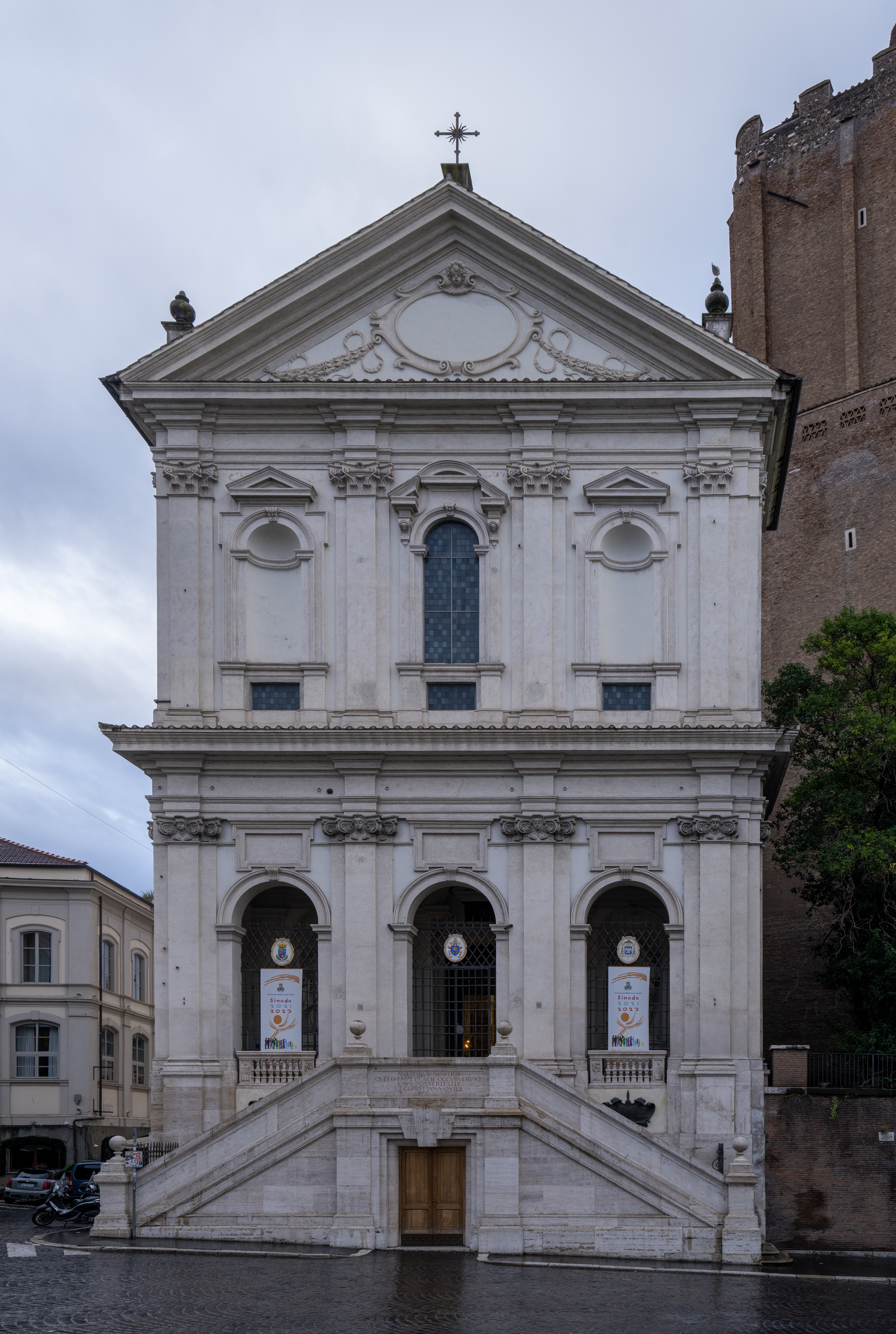
Façade of Santa Caterina a Magnanapoli in Rome, with the Torre delle Milizie behind.

Giovanni Battista Soria (1581 – 22 November 1651) was an Italian architect who lived and worked mostly in Rome.

Tha façades of the church he designed were influenced by the style of Jacopo Barozzi da Vignola and Carlo Maderno.

Soria designed the fountain (c. 1630) at the entrance to the walled garden at the Pontifical University of Saint Thomas Aquinas, Angelicum

== Works ==
- San Gregorio Magno al Celio
- San Carlo ai Catinari
- Santa Maria della Vittoria, Rome
- Discovery of Borghese Hermaphroditus
- San Crisogono
- Santa Caterina a Magnanapoli
- San Giuseppe dei Falegnami
