= Torre delle Milizie =

Historical site in Rome, Italy

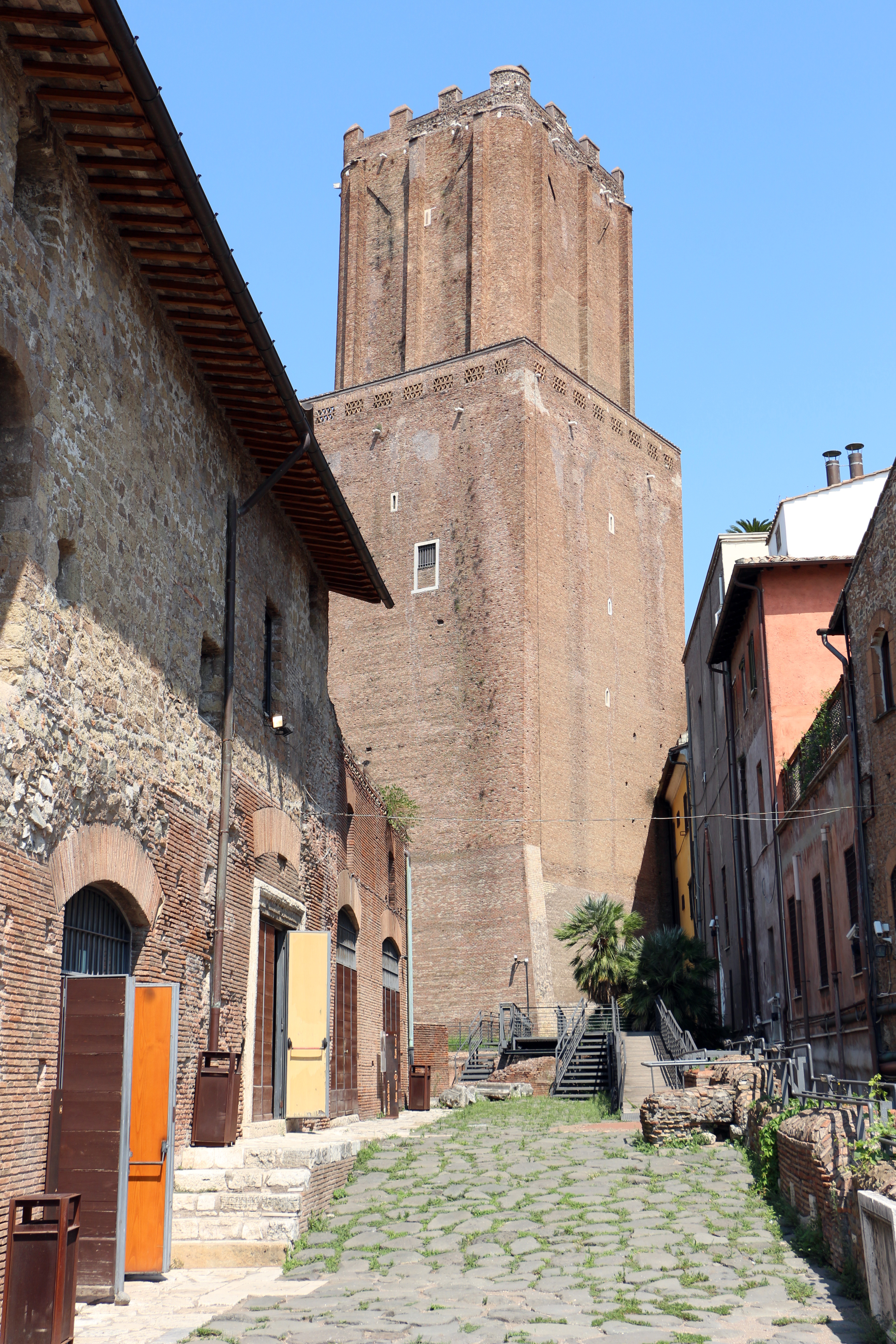
- Torre delle Milizie, 2015
- Interactive map of Torre delle Milizie
- 41°53′45″N 12°29′12″E

The Torre delle Milizie ("Tower of the Militia") is a fortified tower in Rome, Italy, located between Trajan's Market in the Imperial fora to the southwest and the Pontifical University of Saint Thomas Aquinas, or Angelicum, to the east. The tower was the keep of a larger fortified complex known as the Castello delle Milizie, which no longer survives.

== History ==
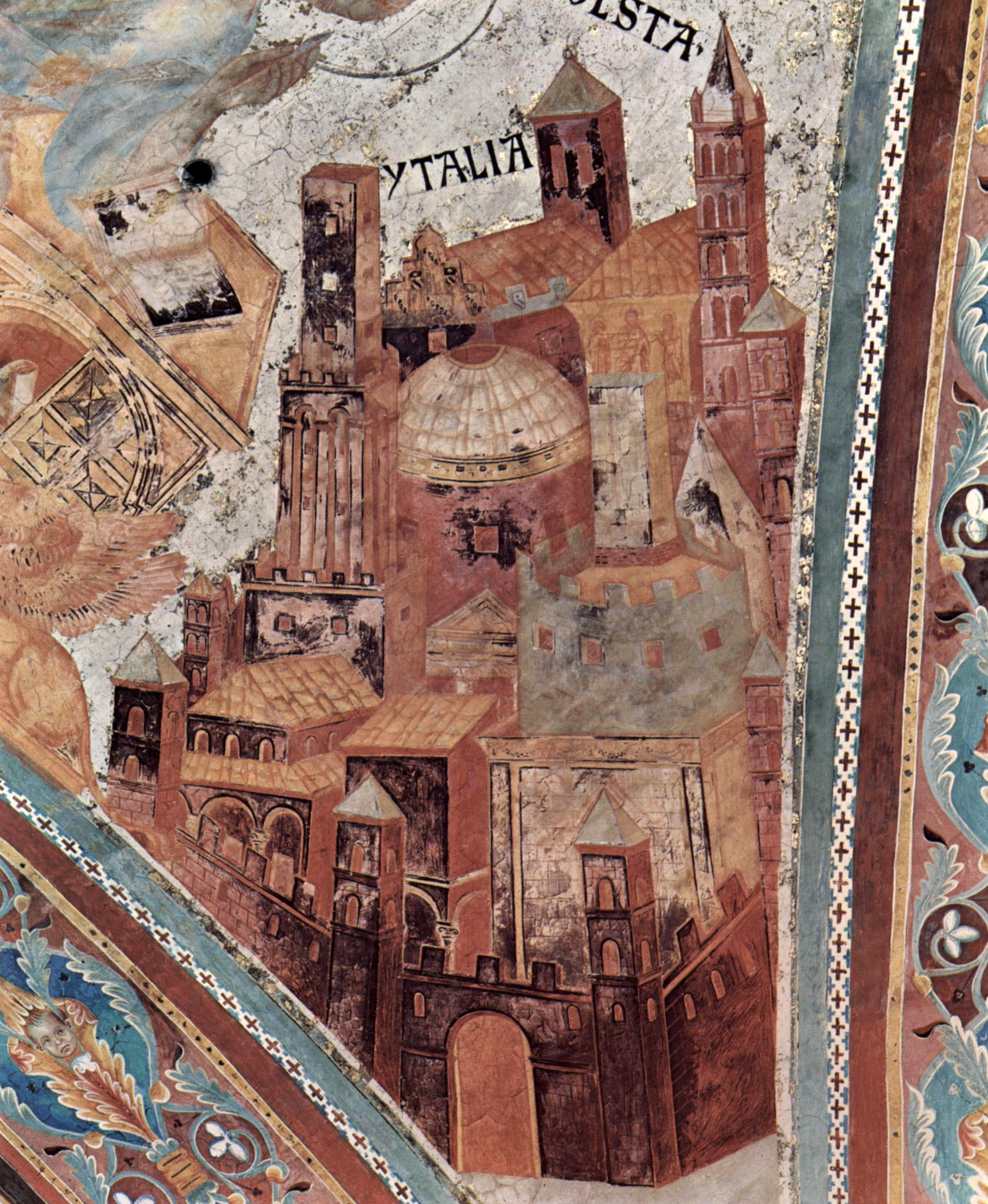
Torre delle Milizie depicted with three levels in Cimabue's "Vault of the Evangelists" c. 1277

The tower gained the popular nickname of "Nero's Tower" from a tradition that it originated as an ancient Roman construction from which the emperor Nero watched the Great Fire of Rome. This is derived from the classical account that he watched from a tower in the Gardens of Maecenas, though more trustworthy accounts place him out of town, at Antium at the time.

The actual construction of the tower probably dates to the early 13th century. Giorgio Vasari attributed it to the architect Marchionne Aretino, who was said to have built it for the Conti family during the pontificate of Pope Innocent III (1198–1216). Architectural and archaeological evidence places its construction between the pontificates of Innocent III and Pope Gregory IX (1227–1241).

At the end of the 13th century, the fortified complex was sold to Pope Boniface VIII, who converted it into a stronghold for his family, the Caetani. It later passed to the Annibaldi family and was confiscated by Henry VII of Luxembourg when he entered Rome in 1311. During his stay in Rome for his coronation as Holy Roman Emperor in May and June 1312, Henry used the Torre delle Milizie as a base for his Ghibelline supporters.

In 1332 the complex returned to the Conti, who divided its ownership with the Orsini family. The Conti retained the tower until 1619, when it was acquired by the nuns of the neighboring convent of Santa Caterina a Magnanapoli. The convent buildings were joined to the tower, while the remaining structures of the medieval castle were removed during the construction of the convent church between 1628 and 1641.

In 1911, the tower was declared an Italian National Monument. Restoration work begun by the architect Antonio Muñoz in 1914 included consolidation of the foundations and separation of the tower from the former convent church. Since 1927 it has formed part of the archaeological complex of Trajan's Markets, and the restoration was completed in 1932.

== Architecture ==
View from the west showing the lean of the tower

One of the main medieval monuments of the city, the Torre delle Milizie is built on a roughly square plan, with a base measuring approximately 15 metres (49 ft) on each side. The base is constructed of tuff, while the two surviving upper storeys are faced with polychrome brickwork.

The tower is now approximately 42 metres (138 ft) high, but originally probably exceeded 50 metres (160 ft). The third and uppermost storey was left unstable by the earthquake of 1349 and was subsequently demolished. The earthquake also contributed to the structure's lean of approximately 1.3 degrees in the direction of the Colosseum. The battlements at the top of the tower are the result of modern restoration work.

== See also ==
- List of leaning towers
- Torre dei Conti

== Bibliography ==
- Adinolfi, Pasquale (1881). Roma nell'età di mezzo (in Italian). Vol. 2. Rome: Fratelli Bocca.
- Armellini, Mariano (1891). Le chiese di Roma dal secolo IV al XIX (in Italian). Rome: Tipografia Vaticana.
- Bernacchio, Nicoletta; Meneghini, Roberto (1994). "Roma. Mercati di Traiano: nuovi dati strutturali sulla Torre delle Milizie". Archeologia Medievale (in Italian). 21: 31–56.
- Bianchi, Lorenzo; Coppola, Maria Rosaria; Mutarelli, Vincenzo (1998). Case e torri medioevali a Roma (in Italian). Vol. 1: Documentazione, storia e sopravvivenza di edifici medioevali nel tessuto urbano di Roma. L'Erma di Bretschneider. ISBN 978-88-706-2988-0.
- Gregorovius, Ferdinand (1897). History of the City of Rome in the Middle Ages. Vol. 5, part 2. Translated by Hamilton, Annie.
- Gregorovius, Ferdinand (1906). History of the City of Rome in the Middle Ages. Vol. 6, part 1. Translated by Hamilton, Annie.
- Manacorda, Daniele (2021). Paesaggi di Roma medievale (in Italian). Viella. ISBN 978-88-331-3792-6.
- Sabatini, Francesco (1914). La Torre delle Milizie erroneamente denominata Torre di Nerone (in Italian). Rome: Loescher.

Preceded by Ospedale di Santo Spirito in Sassia	Landmarks of Rome; Torre delle Milizie	Succeeded by Ponte Sisto
