= Jacopo Celega =

Italian architect

Jacopo Celega (died before 30 March 1386) was a fourteenth-century Italian architect. Little is known of Calegna's biography, but some of his work remains today. Around 1330 he took over construction of the Venetian church Basilica di Santa Maria Gloriosa dei Frari – normally referred to only as the Frari – work that was finished by his son Pier Paolo in 1396.
