= Faustino Trebbi =

Italian painter

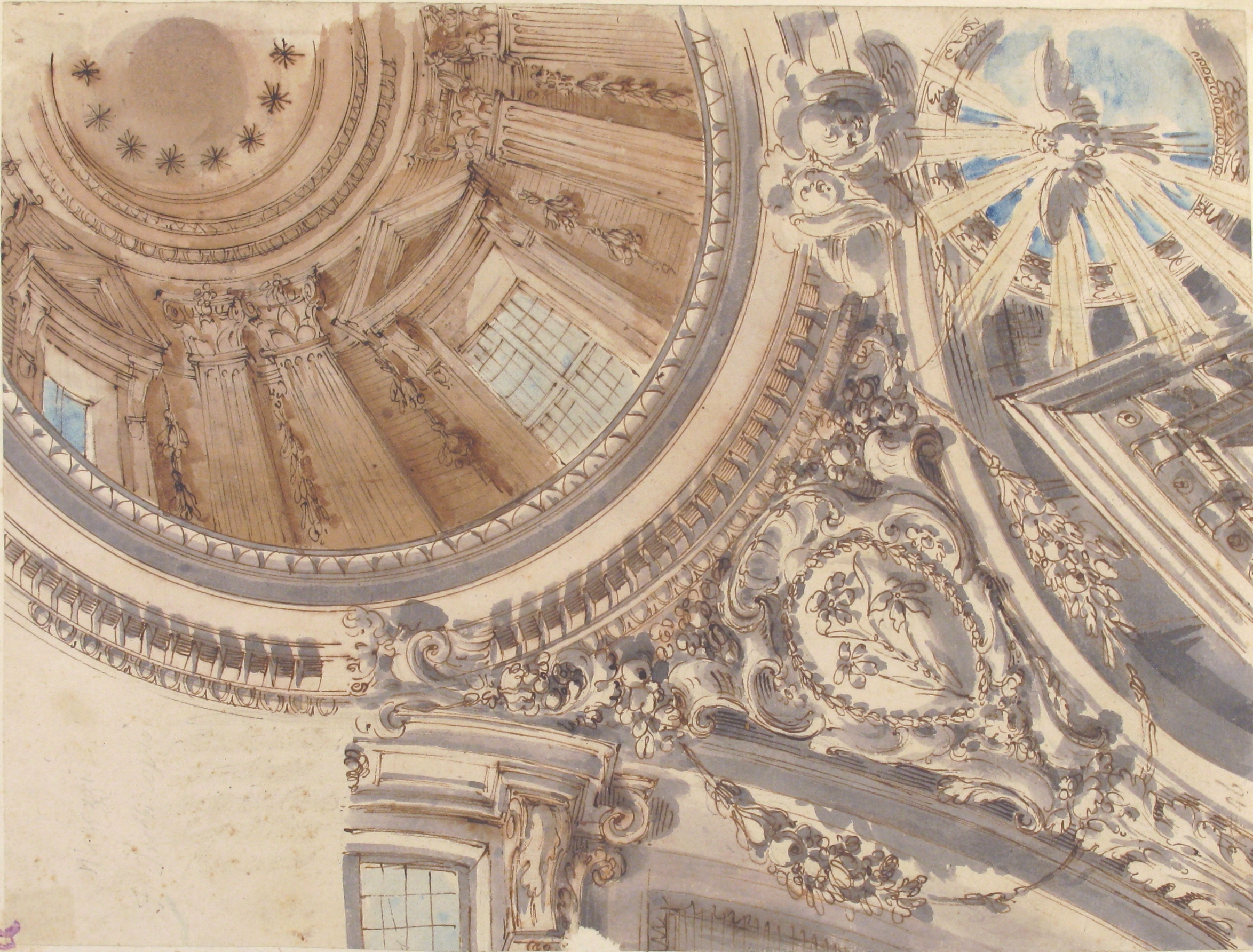

Faustino Trebbi (Budrio, 1761 – Bologna, 1836) was an Italian architect and ornamental painter, often active in painting quadratura frescoes.

His son Raffaele learned painting from his father; while his son Mauro became a professor of Chemistry. One of his pupils was Francesco Cocchi. He helped decorate the church of the Suffragio in Bologna. The chapel of the baptistery in San Lorenzo in Budrio was frescoed by Trebbi.
