= Attilia Vaglieri =

Italian architect (1891–1969)

- Born: 1891; Rome
- Died: 1969 (aged 77–78)
- Occupation: Architect
- Years active: 1920s and 1930s
- Spouse: Umberto Travaglio
- Children: 1
- Father: Dante Vaglieri

Attilia Vaglieri Travaglio (1891–1969) was a pioneering Italian architect and urban planner who carried out her main works in the 1920s and 1930s. She dedicated herself to collective housing projects, urban plans, and projects for sports and recreational facilities, in the “Littorio” style, with 50 works documented around 1935. She won an international competition in Egypt, but she was unable to accept the prize because she was a woman.

== Biography ==
Attilia Vaglieri was born in Rome in 1891 as the third daughter of Dante Vaglieri, an Italian archaeologist who was known for his research on the Palatine Hill and in Ostia Antica. Her sister Laura Veccia Vaglieri became an Orientalist, and another sister Bianca married the archaeologist Renato Bartoccini in 1918, who had begun his studies under her father's direction. Attilia became the wife and business partner of the architect Umberto Travaglio, with whom she had a daughter, Adriana Travaglio Russo born in 1933.

== Career ==
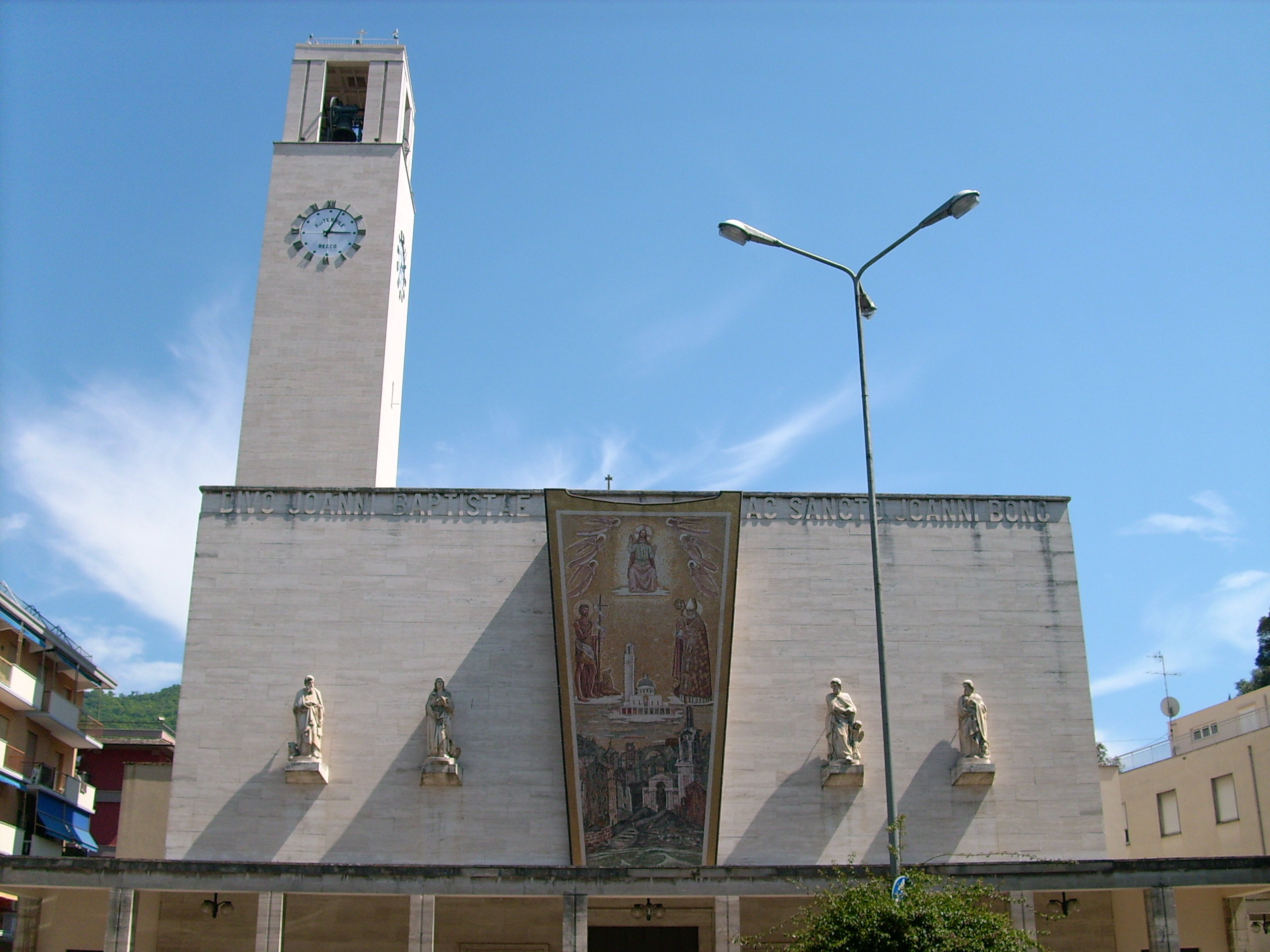
Church of San Giovanni Battista and Giovanni Bono, Liguria, Italy. By Attilia Vaglieri and Umberto Travaglio.

Together with her husband, and sometimes using her married name Attilia Vaglieri Travaglio, she collaborated on several professional projects. The Parish Church of San Giovanni Battista and Giovanni Bono in Recco, Liguria, was developed as part of the city's post-World War II reconstruction program. It was characterized by a modern style and a design using pure and sharp geometric forms and "shaped by the interplay of light and shadow." This church is characterized by its clear geometric design and the way it uses light in the building's interior.

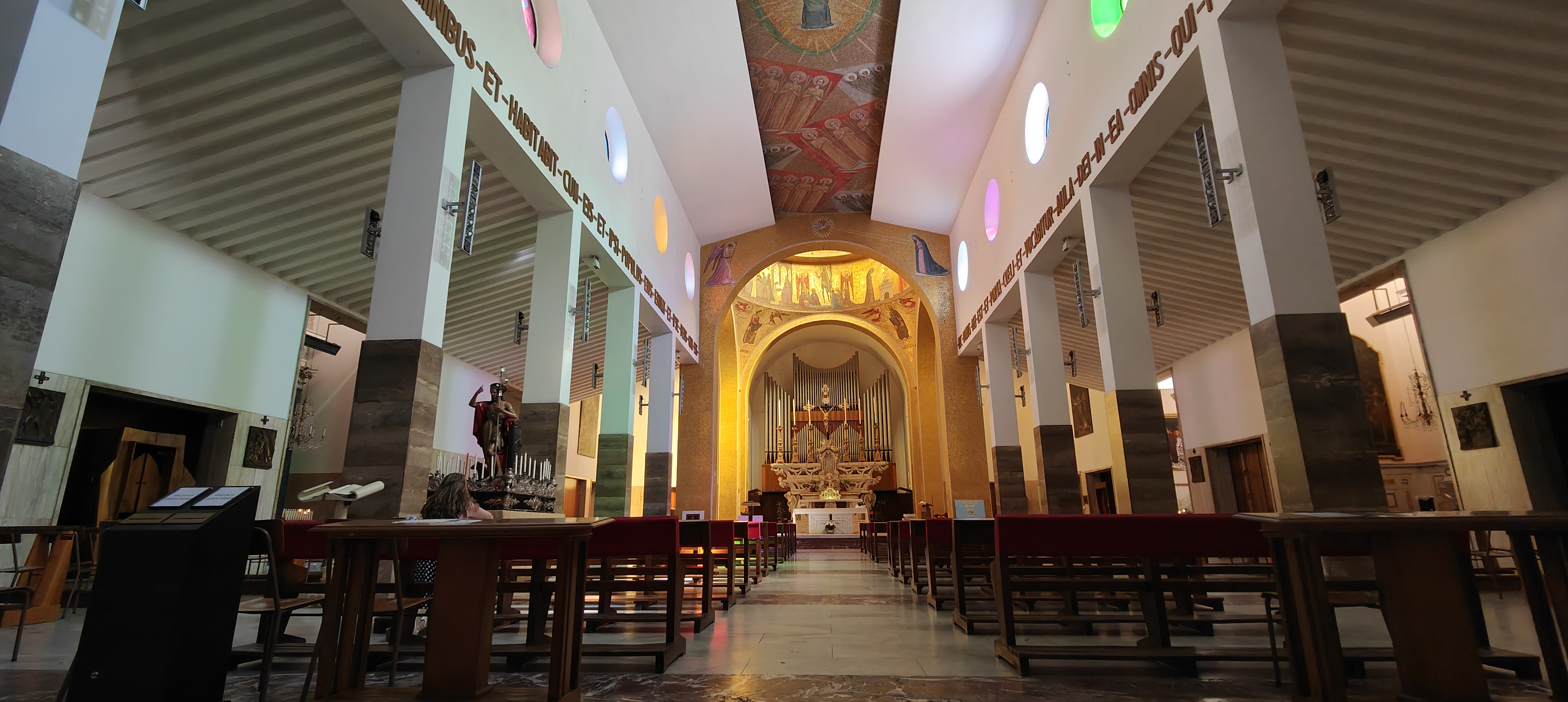
Church interior.

In San Pietro, she built one housing project consisting of a Renaissance-style villa on the Gianicolo and another in a Neoclassical style in San Balbino. She also designed her own house in Novecento style and a project for the cathedral in Beirut, Lebanon. Her renovation of the Dantesque area in Ravenna was part of the general urban development plan of 1928. She also did a study for the construction of the Dux multi-sports city in Ostia.

Vaglieri created a plan for the gigantic music district near the Aventine Hill in Rome, located directly at the southeast corner of the Circus Maximus on the Viale Aventino. It was completed in the early 1930s, and featured an auditorium with a capacity of 60,000 people, and "a symmetrical design and a facade with sinuous lines." The design also included an open-air theater, a congress and music hall, and a residence for the students of the Accademia Nazionale di Santa Cecilia.

== Awards ==
In 1929, she won the international competition for the design of the Greco-Roman Museum in Alexandria, Egypt. However, in accordance with Muslim law, she was unable to receive her prize because she was a woman.

== Selected works ==
=== Architectural works ===
- Church of San Giovanni Battista and Giovanni Bono, Recco, Liguria, Italy
- Renaissance style villa, Gianicolo
- Neoclassical style villa, San Balbino
- Vaglieri House – Travaglio

=== Urban development projects ===
- Renovation of the Dantean area in Ravenna. General urban development plan of 1928
- Sports complex, Dux, Ostia
- Plan for the "music zone," Aventine, Rome
