= Giuseppe Incorpora =

Italian photographer

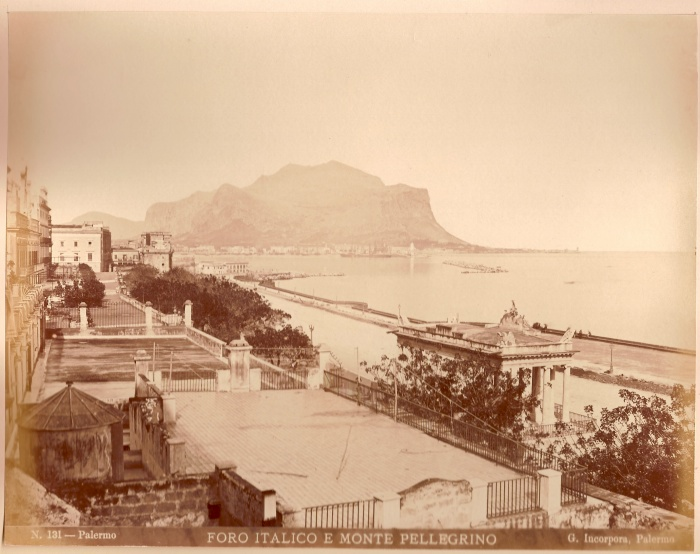

Giuseppe Incorpora (Palermo, 1834-idem, 1914) was an important Italian photographer of 19th century.

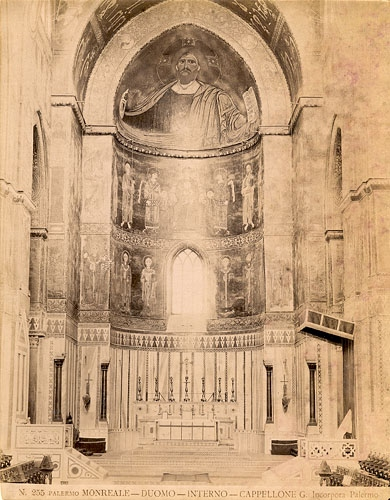
Interior of Monreale Duomo in Palermo.

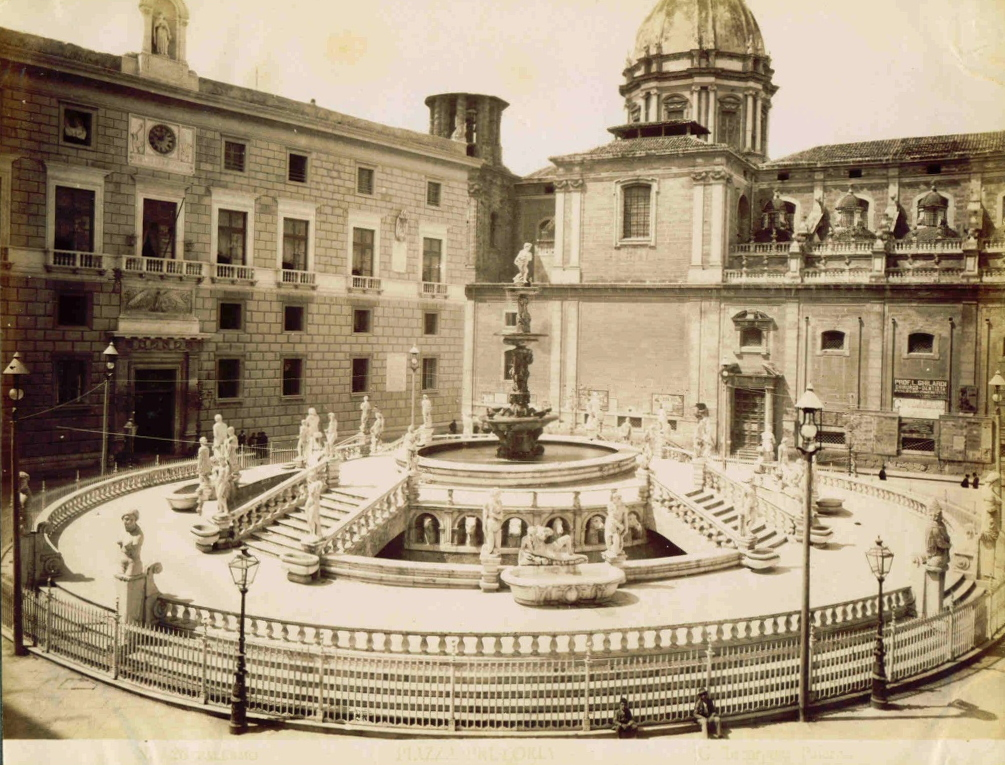
Palermo's Piazza Pretoria Square.
