= Alessandro della Via =

Italian painter

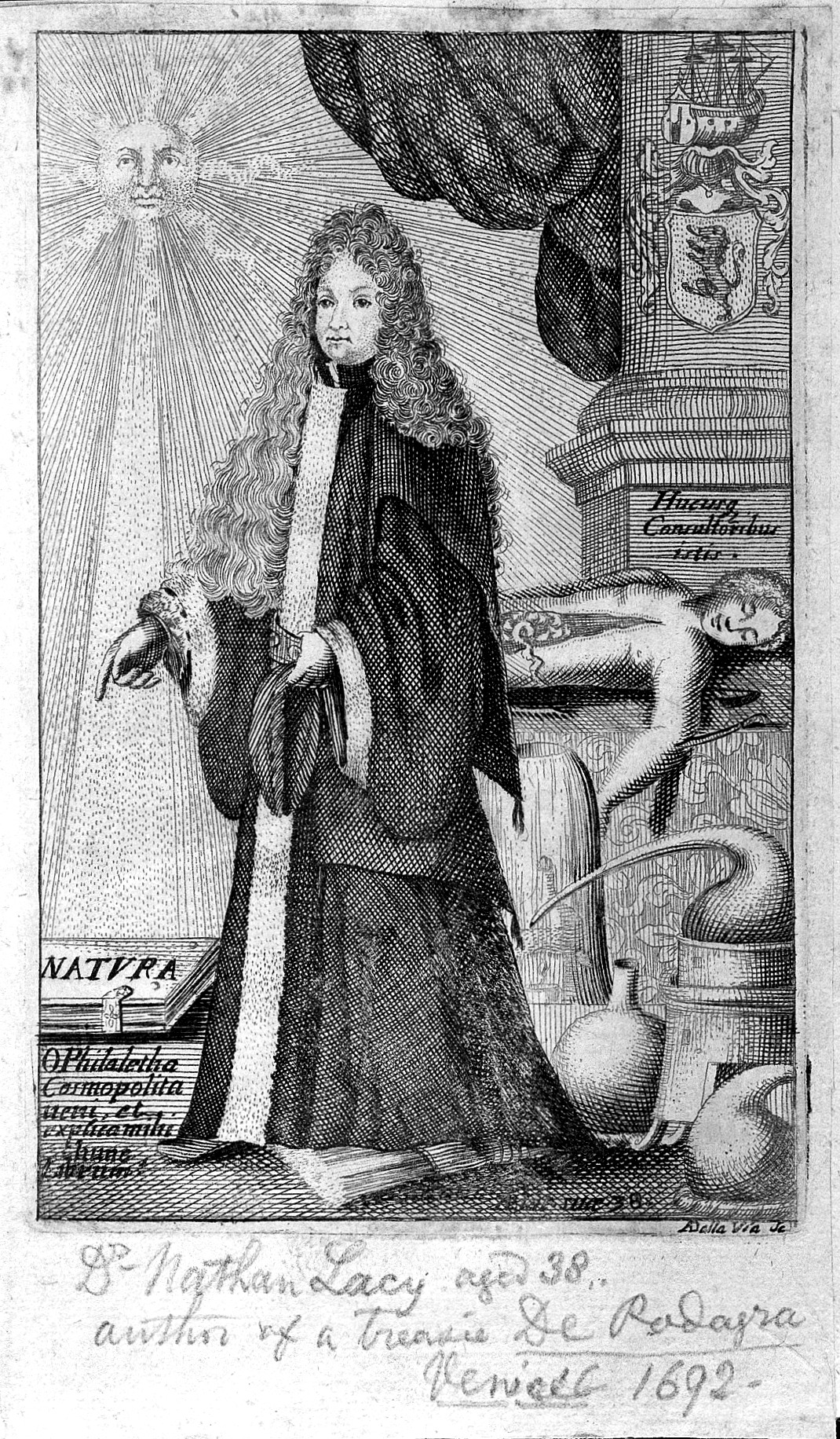
Nathan Lacy. Engraving by Alessandro Della Via.

Alessandro della Via was an Italian engraver. He resided at Venice c. 1730. He engraved several portraits and a plate, representing the Virgin and Infant Christ, with St. Sebastian and other Saints after Paolo Veronese.
