= Luigi Pasquarelli =

Italian sculptor (1832–1889)

Luigi Pasquarelli (2 November 1832, Marsico Nuovo, Basilicata – 1889, Naples, Campania) was an Italian sculptor active in the 19th century.

== Biography ==
Pasquarelli was born in Marsico Nuovo to Antonio Pasquarelli and Antonia Lauria. He later moved to Naples, where he completed his artistic training and established his career.

He gained recognition in 1877 for a marble group titled Un episodio di Pompei, which contributed to his reputation within the Neapolitan artistic scene. His work reflects the realist and genre traditions prevalent in Italian sculpture of the period.

In 1880, Pasquarelli exhibited at Turin a statue entitled Un venditore napoletano di frutta, further demonstrating his focus on everyday life and regional subjects.

Records from the council of Naples in 1872 document a journey undertaken by Pasquarelli to Brazil, suggesting a period of activity or travel abroad.

== Works ==
Pasquarelli produced a range of sculptures, including genre figures, portrait busts, bas-reliefs, and funerary monuments. Notable works include:

- Un episodio di Pompei
- Pescatore amalfitano
- Piccola ciociara
- Fruttivendola
- Busto muliebre
- Un venditore napoletano di frutta
