= Alfonso Nano =

Italian footballer (born 1987)

Personal information
- Full name: Alfonso Nano
- Date of birth: 29 April 1987 (age 39)
- Place of birth: Potenza, Italy
- Position: Midfielder

Senior career*
Years	Team	Apps	(Gls)
2008	Livingston	0	(0)
2016-2018	Grumentum Val d'Agri		
2018-2021	Brienza		
2021	Vultur		
- Calcio San Cataldo
- * Club domestic league appearances and goals as of 17:00, 5 November 2022 (UTC)

Alfonso Nano is an Italian former professional footballer who played as a midfielder.

== Club career ==
Having started his career in Italy, Nano signed for Scottish side Livingston in July 2008. His stay in Scotland was short, as he was released in November 2008.

Following his short spell in Scotland, Nano played for several lower league clubs in Italy.
