= Bartolommeo Tutiani =

Bartolommeo Tutiani was an Italian engraver on wood of the Renaissance period. He completed an engraving of Christ insulted by the Jews, printed in Augsburg in 1515.
