= Leonardo dell'Arca =

Italian painter

Leonardo dell'Arca was an Italian engraver, active c. 1600. Specimens of his work are included in the permanent collection of the Victoria and Albert Museum.
