= Santa Maria Assunta, Montefiorino =

Roman Catholic Church in Montefiorino, Italy

Coordinates: 44.3577°N 10.6092°E

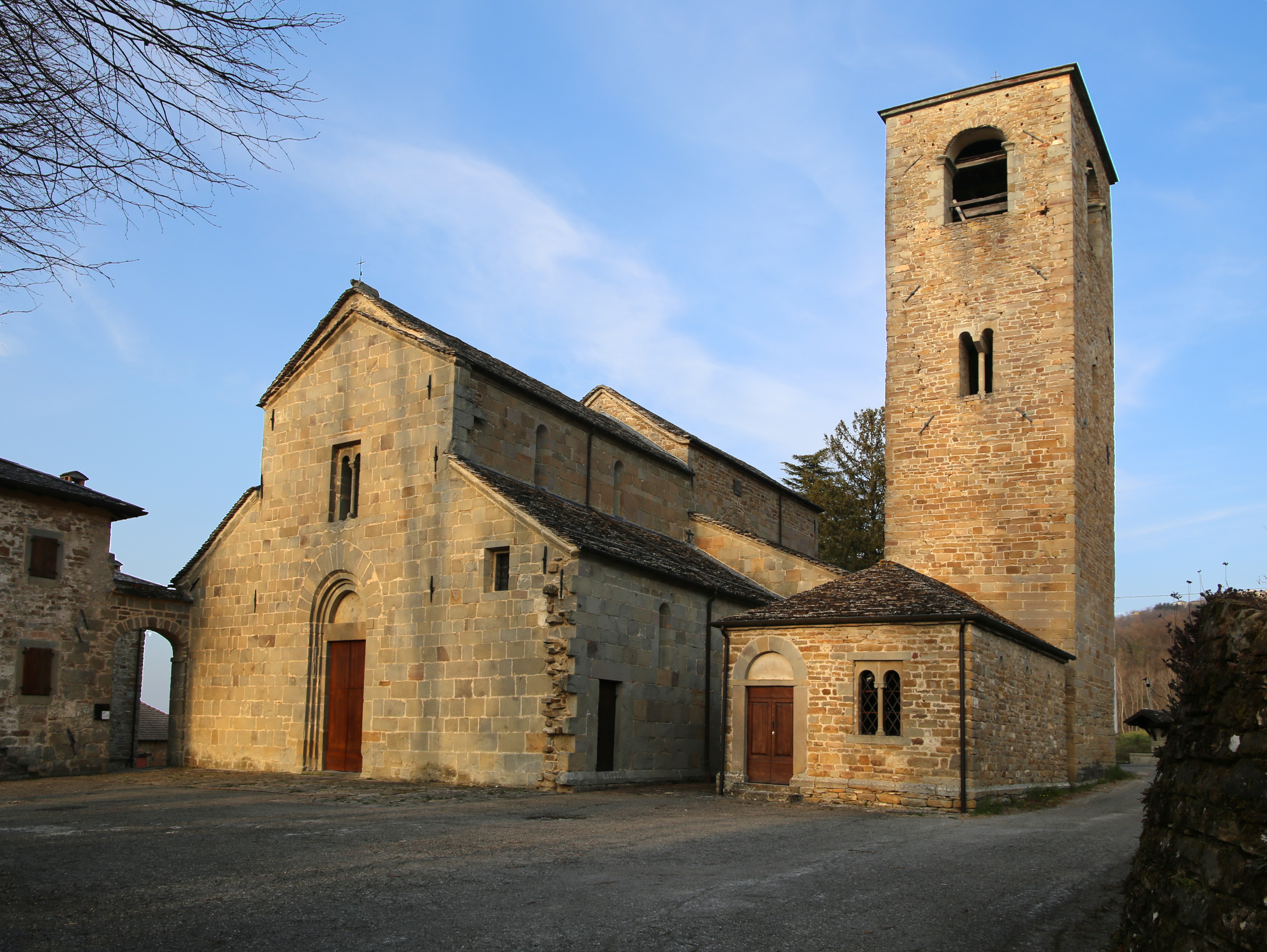
Santa Maria Assunta, Montefiorino

Santa Maria Assunta is Romanesque-style, Roman Catholic parish church located at Via della Chiesa in the frazione of Rubbiano, in the town of Montefiorino, province of Modena, in the region of Emilia-Romagna, Italy.

== History ==
A church at the site was likely founded in the 7th century, and is documented from the late 9th century, when it was noted to require reconstruction. It was located along the pilgrimage route from Emilia to Tuscany, and likely had an associated hospice. With the establishment Abbey of Frassinoro by Countess Matilda in 1071, the church of Rubbiano lost importance. The bell-tower was erected in the 12th century.

It was built in stone in a basilica layout with a sloped roof and tall center nave with lower aisles. At the end of the nave are three apses. The roofline has a toothed decoration. The nave is delimited by typical Romanesque columns, sculpted with decorative motifs of plants, animals, and men. The 12th-13th century sculpted baptismal font has a former Roman capital as a base.
