= Donizo =

Italian monk and author (born c. 1071)

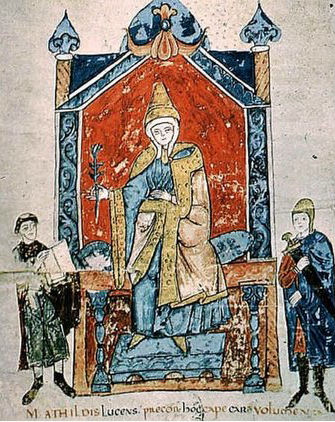
Miniature of Matilda of Tuscany from the frontispiece of Donizo's Vita Mathildis (Codex Vat. Lat. 4922, fol. 7v.). Matilda is depicted seated. On her right, Donizo presents her with a copy his work, on her left is a man with a sword (possibly her man-at-arms).

Donizo (also Domnizo, Donizone) of Canossa, was an Italian monk and author in the late eleventh and early twelfth centuries. His work is an important source on Matilda of Tuscany and her dynasty, and also on Gregorian Reform and the Investiture Controversy more generally.

== Life ==
Donizo was born c. 1071/2, perhaps at Canossa or at Parma. He became a monk at the Benedictine monastery of Sant’Apollonio of Canossa c. 1086/7. By 1136 he was abbot of the monastery.

== Works ==
He composed several works in Latin, including the Enarratio Genesis, a fragmentary commentary on the Book of Genesis, of which 378 leonine verses remain.

His most famous work is the Vita Mathildis (Life of Matilda, Rome, Vatican, Bib. Apostolica, MS. Lat. 4922), written in leonine hexameters. The Life is divided into two books, the first of which entitled, De Principibus Canusinis (‘'On the princes of Canossa’'), concentrates on the ancestors of Matilda of Tuscany, and their possession of the castle of Canossa; the second book focuses on Matilda herself. The Vita Mathildis was written between 1111 and 1115. It was completed shortly after Matilda died in July 1115 and was thus hastily re-dedicated to Empress Matilda.

There are many later medieval epitomes (or versions) of Donizo's Life of Matilda.
