= Polirone Abbey =

Abbey in San Benedetto Po, Lombardy

Coordinates: 45°02′32″N 10°55′43″E

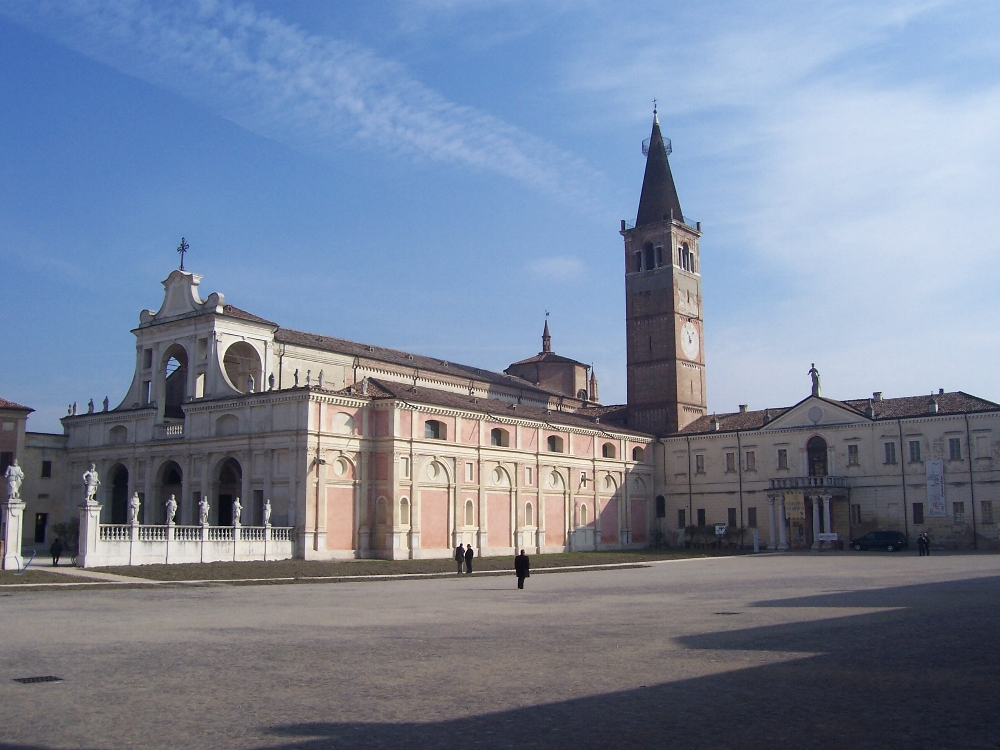
Giulio Romano's abbey church at Polirone, with its traditional enclosed forecourt, the Piazza Matilde di Canossa in the foreground

The Abbey of San Benedetto in Polirone is a large complex of Benedictine order monastic buildings, including a church and cloisters, located in the town of San Benedetto Po, Province of Mantua, Region of Lombardy, Italy. The complex, now belonging to the city, houses offices, a museum, and is open to visitors.

== History ==
The abbey was founded in 1007 by Tedald, count of Canossa, the paternal grandfather of Matilda of Canossa, countess of Tuscany, with a grant to the Benedictine monks, of half his land lying between the rivers Po and Lirone, prompting the title "in Polirone". Polirone was the monastery most closely associated with his granddaughter, Matilda, who granted estates and dependencies. Boniface III, Margrave of Tuscany made further grants and commissioned a larger church, housing the remains of the hermit, Simeon of Polirone (died 1016). In 1077 the community passed into the reformed Benedictines under the Abbey of Cluny. At the time of the Gregorian reforms, the abbot was one of the principal proponents of the papacy in the Investiture Conflict.

From 1115 until 1632, the abbey church housed the arca raised on eight columns housing the mortal remains of Matilda of Canossa, who had selected Polirone as her memorial place, rather than the ancestral mortuary church of Canossa. For centuries, she was accorded almost the veneration of a founding patron saint at Polirone. Her body was transferred to the Basilica of St. Peter, Rome, in 1632.

Polirone was one of the richest abbeys of northern Italy. In the 15th century, Guido Gonzaga, abbot in commendam, rebuilt the church in late Gothic style. The abbey church was rebuilt again to Renaissance style designs of Giulio Romano, in 1539-44, but some floor mosaics and sculptural details survive from the earlier church. The wall and vaults were extensively frescoed, by Antonio da Correggio and Antonio Begarelli, among others. Funding for reconstruction was posthumously granted by two main donors: Lucrezia Pico della Mirandola, sister of the humanist Giovanni Pico della Mirandola, greeted by the monastic community as a "new Matilda"; and Cesare d'Arsago. Thirty-one figures by Antonio Begarelli of Modena were provided for the church, and Paolo Veronese painted three altarpieces in 1562.

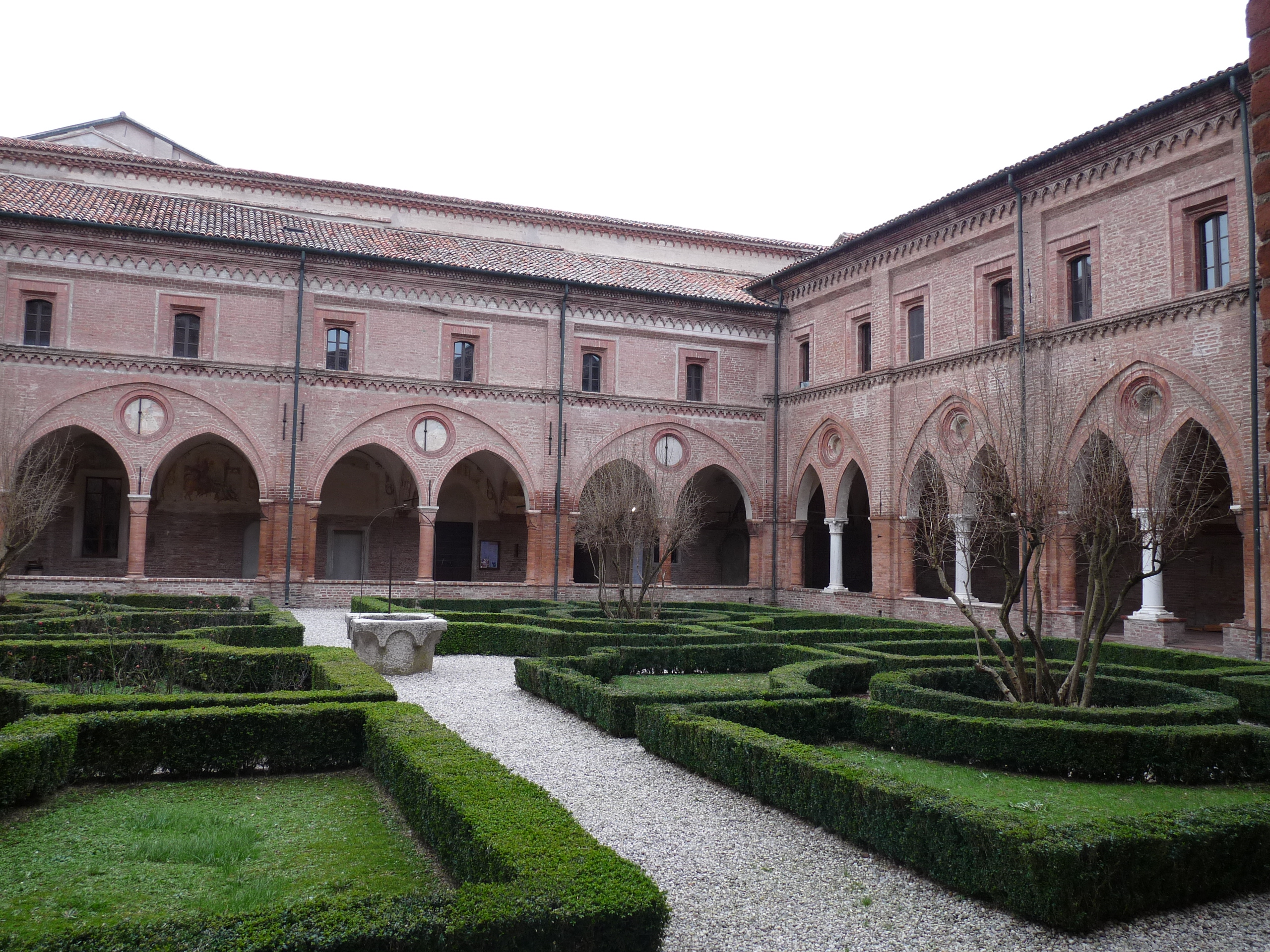
The vaulted Chiostro dei Secolari housed visitors apart from the monks.

In 1797, the abbey was secularized by Napoleonic rulers. Three cloisters, the free-standing great refectory (1478–79), the "new" infirmary (1584), and the abbey church are still present, and open to visitors. The contents of the library were added to the Library of Mantua.

Three themed itineraries of the monastery, offered since the millennium celebration of 2007, concentrate on aspects of the cloistered life at Polirone: "Land and daily bread", "Herbs and monks", and "Prayer and reading".
