= Matilda of Tuscany =

Margravine of Tuscany from 1055 to 1115

Matilda
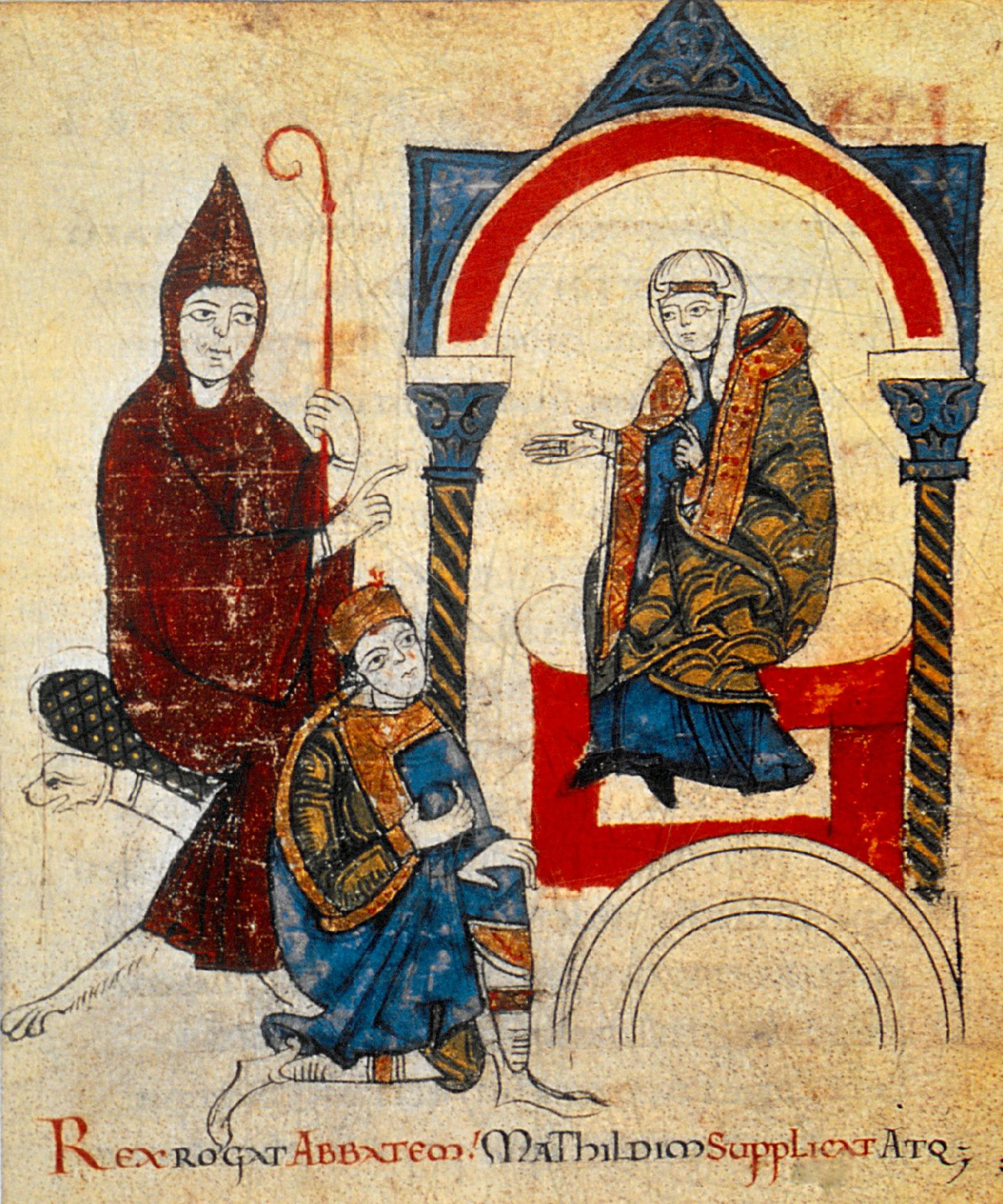
- Abbot Hugh of Cluny and kneeling Henry IV in supplication to enthroned Matilda (Note: Her throne is roofed over by a stone canopy (ciborium) in the illustration. The ciborium should emphasize the rank of rulers direct from God. They were unusual for women; only the Byzantine empresses were depicted in this way. Only the king is shown in the formal supplication of a vassal with a bent knee, while Hugh and Matilda are sitting. The caption reads: "The king makes a request to the abbot and asks Mathilde humbly" (Rex rogat abbatem Mathildim supplicat atque). Donizo's Vita Mathildis (Vatican Library, Codex Vat. Lat. 4922, fol. 49v))

Margravine of Tuscany
- Reign: July 1055 – 24 July 1115
- Predecessor: Frederick
- Successor: Rabodo
- Regent: Beatrice of Lorraine (1055–1076)
- Born: c. 1046; Lucca, Margraviate of Tuscany, or Mantua, Lordship of Mantua
- Died: 24 July 1115 (aged 68–69); Bondeno di Roncore, Reggiolo, Margraviate of Tuscany
- Burial: Polirone Abbey (until 1633); Castel Sant'Angelo (until 1645); St. Peter's Basilica (since 1645)
- Spouse: Godfrey IV, Duke of Lower Lorraine (m. 1069; died 1076) Welf II, Duke of Bavaria (m. 1089; sep. 1095)
- Dynasty: House of Canossa
- Father: Boniface III, Margrave of Tuscany
- Mother: Beatrice of Lorraine
- Religion: Catholicism

Matilda of Canossa (Italian: Matilde; c. 1046 – 24 July 1115) was the countess (or margravine) of Tuscany and ruler of much of central Italy from the 1070s until her death. Known as la Gran Contessa ("the Great Countess"), Matilda was one of the most important governing figures of medieval Italy. She reigned in a time of constant battles, political intrigues, and excommunications by the Church.

She ruled as a feudal margravine and, as a relative of the imperial Salian dynasty, she brokered a settlement in the so-called Investiture Controversy. In this extensive conflict with the emerging reform Papacy over the relationship between spiritual (sacerdotium) and secular (regnum) power, Pope Gregory VII dismissed and excommunicated King (later Emperor) Henry IV in 1076. At the same time, Matilda came into possession of a substantial territory that included present-day Lombardy, Emilia, Romagna, and Tuscany. She made the Canossa Castle, in the Apennines south west of Reggio Emilia, the centre of her domains.

After his famous penitential walk in front of Canossa Castle in January 1077, Henry IV was accepted back into the Church by the Pope. However, the understanding between the Emperor and the Pope was short-lived. In the conflicts with Henry IV that arose a little later, from 1080, Matilda put all her military and material resources into the service of the Papacy. Her court became a refuge for many displaced persons during the turmoil of the investiture dispute and enjoyed a cultural boom. Even after the death of Pope Gregory VII in 1085, Matilda remained a vital pillar of the Reform Church. Between 1081 and 1098, grueling disputes with Henry IV meant Canossan rule was in crisis. The historical record is sparse for this time. A turning point resulted from Matilda forming a coalition with the southern German dukes, who opposed Henry IV.

In 1097, Henry IV retreated past the Alps to the northern portion of the Holy Roman Empire, and a power vacuum developed in Italy. The struggle between regnum and sacerdotium changed the social and rulership structure of the Italian cities permanently, giving them space for emancipation from foreign rule and communal development. From autumn 1098, Matilda regained many of her lost domains. Until the end, she tried to bring the cities under her control. After 1098, she increasingly used the opportunities offered to her to consolidate her rule again. Since she was childless, in her final years, Matilda developed her legacy by focusing her donation activity on Polirone Abbey.

The account of Donizo reports that between 6 and 11 May 1111, Matilda was crowned Imperial Vicar and Vice-Queen of Italy by Henry V at Bianello Castle (Quattro Castella, Reggio Emilia). With her death, the House of Canossa became extinct in 1115. Well into the thirteenth century, popes and emperors fought over what was called the Terre Matildiche ("Matildine domains") as their rich inheritance.

The rule of Matilda and her influence became identified as a cultural epoch in Italy that found expression in the flowering of numerous artistic, musical, and literary designs and miracle stories and legends. Her legacy reached its apogee during the Counter-Reformation and the Baroque Period. Pope Urban VIII had Matilda's body transferred to Rome in 1630, where she was the first woman to be buried in Saint Peter's Basilica.

== Parents, birth, and early years ==
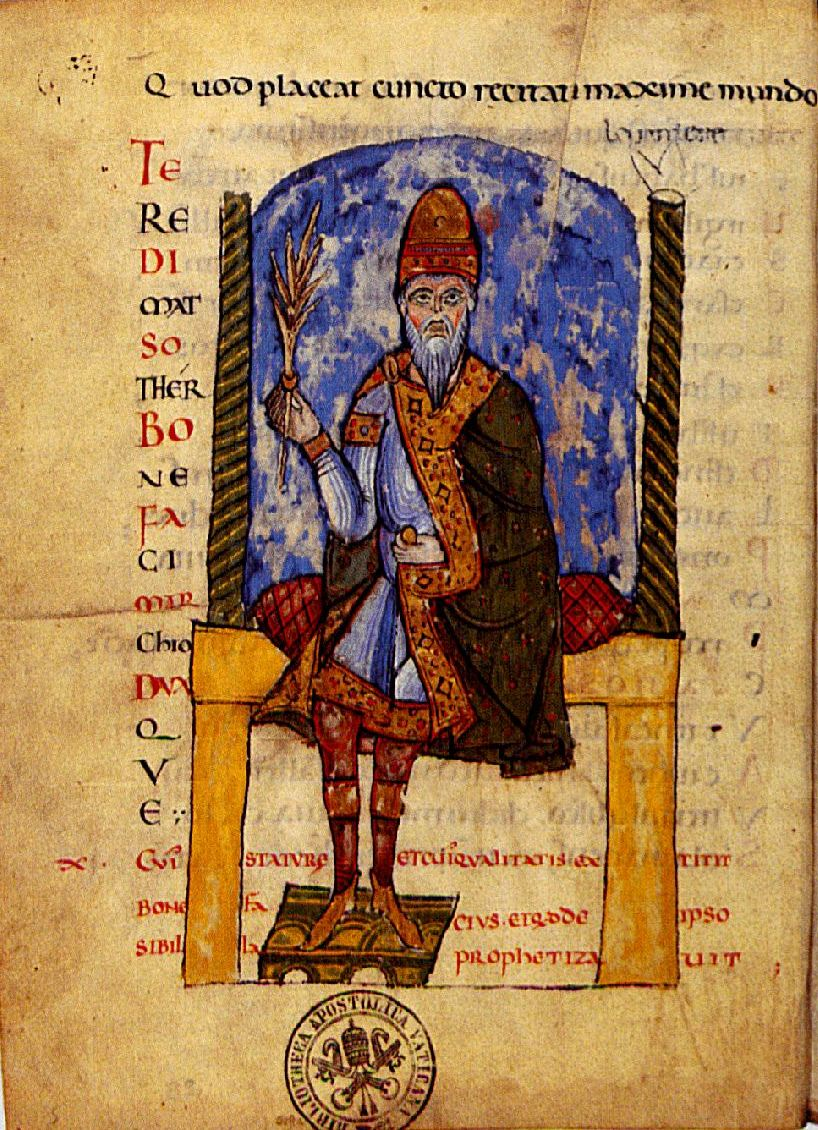
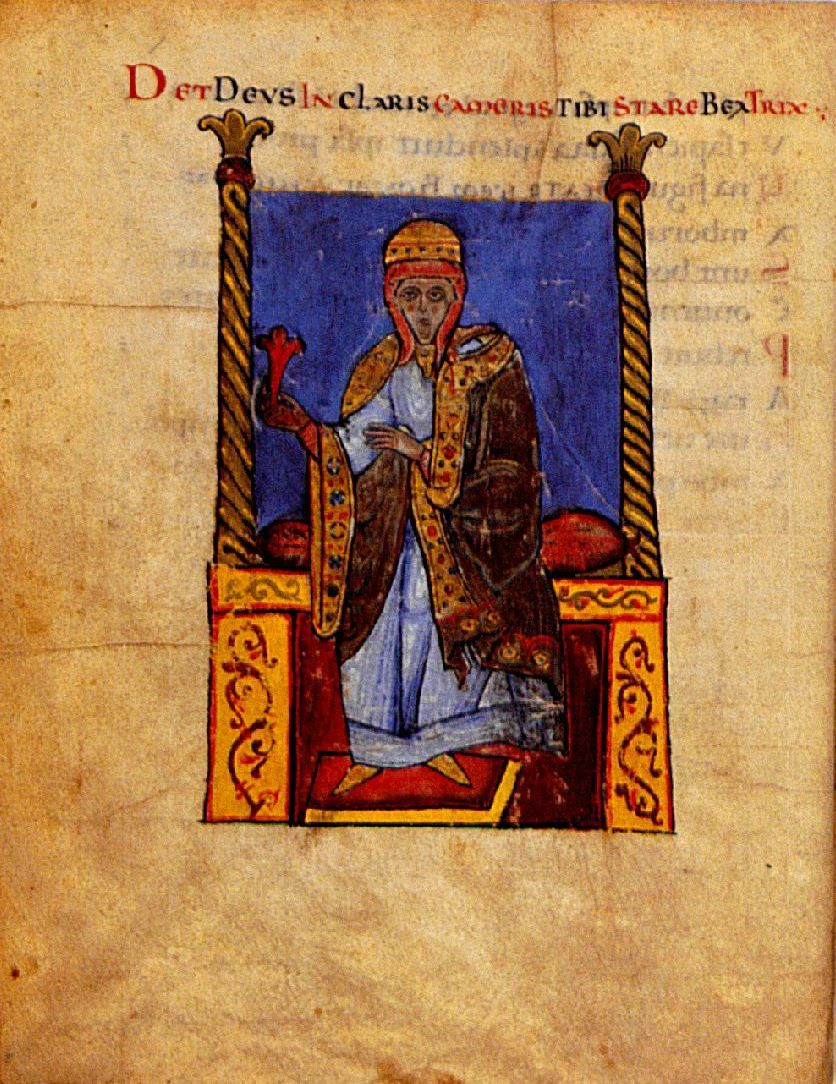
Matilda's parents, Boniface (l) and Beatrice (r) - Donizo's Vita Mathildis (Vatican Library, Codex Vat. Lat. 4922, fol. 28v–30v)

Matilda's parents, Boniface and Beatrice of Lorraine, first met on the occasion of the wedding of Conrad II's son Henry with Gunhilda of Denmark in 1036 at the city of Nijmegen shortly after Boniface had become a widower early that year. Beatrice was the niece and foster daughter of Empress Gisela of Swabia. A marriage covenant was arranged, and one year later, in June 1037, Boniface and Beatrice celebrated their marriage in high style, keeping court at Marengo for three months afterward. According to the marital agreements, Beatrice brought important assets in Lorraine: the Château of Briey and the Lordships of Stenay, Mouzay, Juvigny, Longlier, and Orval that constituted the northern part of her paternal family's ancestral lands. Beatrice and her sister, Sophia, were the daughters of Duke Frederick II of Upper Lorraine and Matilda of Swabia. After the deaths of their parents, she and her sister had been raised in the imperial court by their maternal aunt, Empress Gisela. For Boniface, the marriage to Beatrice, a close relative of the emperor, brought him not only prestige, but also the prospect to have an heir. His first wife had been Richilda, a daughter of Giselbert II, Count Palatine of Bergamo, and their only child was a daughter who was born and died in 1014. Boniface and Beatrice had three children, Beatrice (named after her mother), Frederick (named after his maternal grandfather), and Matilda (named after her maternal grandmother). Matilda, probably born around 1046, was the youngest child.

Matilda's birthplace and exact date of birth are unknown. Italian scholars have been arguing about her place of birth for centuries. According to Francesco Maria Fiorentini, a doctor and scholar of the seventeenth century, she was born in Lucca, an assumption reinforced by a miniature in the early twelfth-century Vita Mathildis by the monk Donizo (or, in Italian, Donizone), where Matilda is referred to as 'Resplendent Matilda' (Mathildis Lucens): since the Latin word lucens is similar to lucensis (of/from Lucca), this also may be a reference to Matilda's birthplace and he interpreted it as such. For Benedictine scholar Camillo Affarosi, Canossa was her place of birth. Lino Lionello Ghirardini and Paolo Golinelli both advocated Mantua as her birthplace. A recent publication by Michèle Kahn Spike also favors Mantua, as it was the center for Boniface's court at the time. In addition, Ferrara or the small Tuscan town of San Miniato have been discussed as the possible birthplace. According to author Elke Goez, sources cannot prove that there was a permanent household location for Boniface of Canossa in either Mantua or any other place.

Scholars generally believe that Matilda must have spent her early years around her mother, who was renowned for her learning. She was literate in Latin, as well as reputed to speak German and French. The extent of Matilda's education in military matters is debated. It has been asserted that she was taught strategy, tactics, riding, and wielding weapons, but some scholarship challenges these claims. Her father, Boniface of Canossa, was a feared and hated prince for some small vassals throughout his life. On 7 May 1052, he was ambushed while hunting in the forest of San Martino dall'Argine near Mantua and killed. Following the death of their father, Matilda's brother, Frederick, inherited the family lands and titles under the regency of their mother, who not only managed to hold the family patrimony together but also made important contacts with leading figures in the Church renewal movement. Beatrice developed into an increasingly important pillar of the reform of the Papacy. Matilda's older sister, Beatrice, died the next year (before 17 December 1053), making Matilda heiress presumptive to Frederick's personal holdings. Beatrice was Regent of Tuscany from 1052 until her death in 1076 during the minority of and in co-regency with Matilda.

In mid-1054, determined to safeguard the interests of her children as well as her own, Beatrice of Lorraine married Godfrey the Bearded, a distant kinsman who had been stripped of the Duchy of Upper Lorraine after openly rebelling against Emperor Henry III. Emperor Henry III was enraged by his cousin Beatrice's unauthorised union with his most vigorous adversary and took the opportunity to have her arrested, along with Matilda, when he marched south to attend a synod in Florence on Pentecost in 1055. Her brother Frederick's rather suspicious death soon thereafter made Matilda the last member of the House of Canossa. Mother and daughter were taken to Germany, but Godfrey the Bearded successfully avoided capture. Unable to defeat him, Henry III sought a rapprochement. The Emperor's early death in October 1056, which brought to throne the underage Henry IV, seems to have accelerated the negotiations and the restoration of the previous balance of power.

Godfrey the Bearded was reconciled with the imperial family and recognized as Margrave of Tuscany in December, while Beatrice and Matilda were released. By the time she and her mother returned to Italy, in the company of Pope Victor II, Matilda was formally acknowledged as sole heiress to the greatest territorial lordship in the southern part of the Empire. In June 1057 the Pope held a synod in Florence; he was present during the infamous capture of Beatrice and Matilda, and, with the deliberated choice of location of the synod also made it clear that the House of Canossa had returned to Italy, strengthened at the side of the Pope and had been completely rehabilitated. With Henry IV being a minor, the reform Papacy sought the protection of the powerful House of Canossa. According to Donizo, the Panegyric biographer of Matilda and her ancestors, she was familiar with both French and German due to her origins and living conditions.

Matilda's mother and stepfather thus became heavily involved in the series of disputed papal elections during their regency, supporting the Gregorian Reforms. Godfrey the Bearded's brother, Frederick, became Pope Stephen IX, while both of the following two popes, Nicholas II and Alexander II, had been Tuscan bishops. Matilda made her first journey to Rome with her family in the entourage of Nicholas II in 1059. Godfrey and Beatrice actively assisted them in dealing with antipopes, while the role of adolescent Matilda remains unclear. A contemporary account of her stepfather's 1067 expedition against Prince Richard I of Capua on behalf of the papacy mentions Matilda's participation in the campaign, describing it as the "first service that the most excellent daughter of Boniface offered to the blessed prince of the apostles".

== First marriage: Godfrey the Hunchback ==
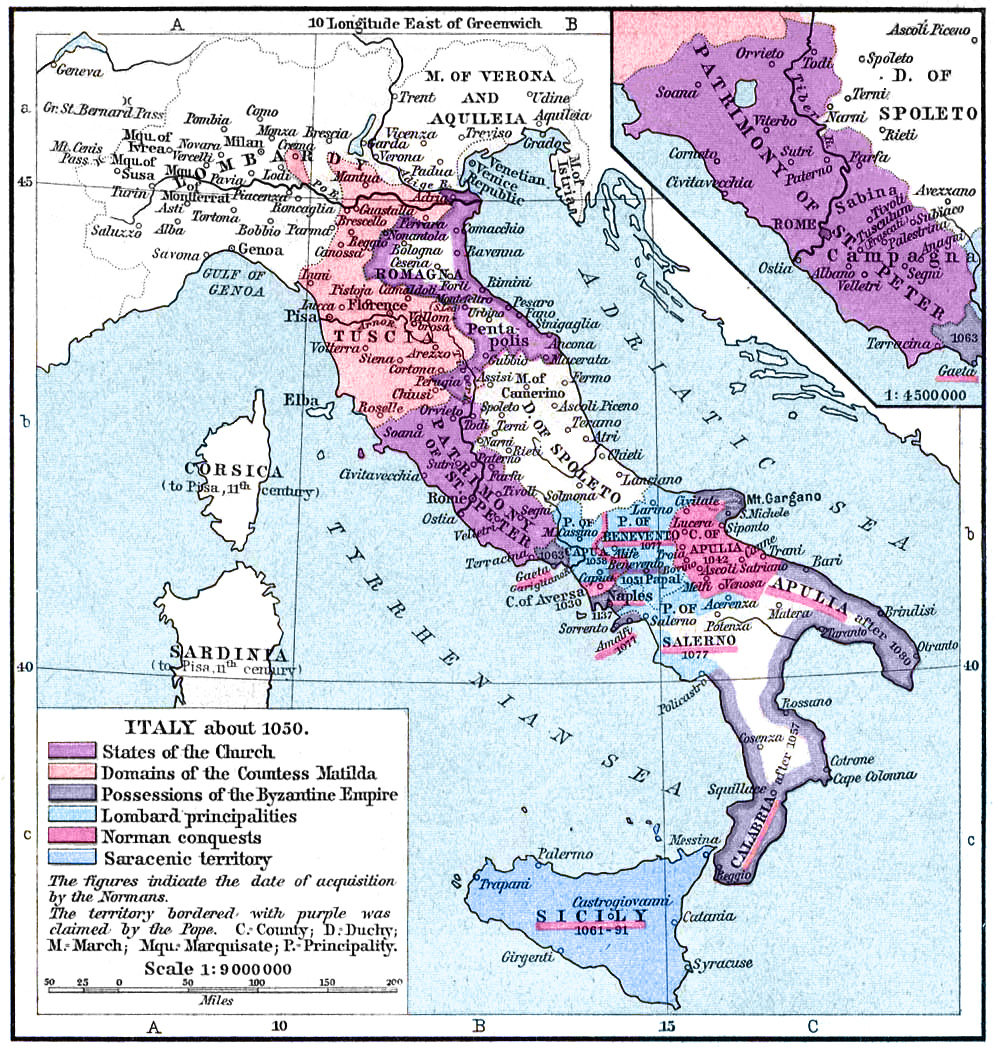
The states of the Apennine Peninsula in the second half of the eleventh century

Possibly taking advantage of the minority of Henry IV, Beatrice and Godfrey the Bearded wanted to consolidate the connection between the Houses of Lorraine and Canossa in the long term by marrying their two children. Around 1055, Matilda and her stepbrother Godfrey the Hunchback (son of Godfrey the Bearded from his first marriage) were betrothed. In May 1069, as Godfrey the Bearded lay dying in Verdun, Beatrice and Matilda hastened to reach Lorraine, anxious to ensure a smooth transition of power. Matilda was present at her stepfather's deathbed, and on that occasion she is for the first time clearly mentioned as the wife of her stepbrother. After the death of Godfrey the Bearded on 30 December, the newlyweds stayed in Lorraine. Beatrice returned to Italy alone. Matilda became pregnant in 1070. Godfrey the Hunchback seems to have informed the Salian imperial court about this event; in a charter from Henry IV dated 9 May 1071, Godfrey or his heirs are mentioned. Matilda gave birth to a daughter, named Beatrice after her maternal grandmother, but the child died a few weeks after the birth, before 29 August 1071. In 1071, the elder Beatrice had donated property to the Abbey of Frassinoro for the salvation of her granddaughter's soul, and she granted twelve farms "for the health and life of my beloved daughter Matilda" (pro incolomitate et anima Matilde dilecte filie mee).

Matilda and Godfrey the Hunchback's marriage proved a failure after a short time. The death of their only child and Godfrey's physical deformity may have helped fuel deep animosity between the spouses. By the end of 1071, Matilda had left her husband and returned to Italy, where her stay in Mantua on 19 January 1072 can be proven. From there, she and her mother issued a deed of donation for the Monastery of Sant'Andrea. Godfrey the Hunchback fiercely protested the separation and demanded that Matilda come back to him, but she repeatedly refused. In early 1072, he descended into Italy and visited several places in Tuscany, determined not only to enforce the marriage but to lay claim to these areas as Matilda's husband. During this time, Matilda stayed in Lucca, and there is no evidence that the couple met. Additionally, Godfrey the Hunchback is named as her husband only in a single document dated 18 August 1073 signed in Mantua for a donation for the Monastery of San Paolo in Parma. In his efforts to restore his marital bond, Godfrey the Hunchback sought the help of both Matilda's mother and her ally, the newly elected Pope Gregory VII. He promised military aid to the latter. However, Matilda's resolution was unshakable, and in the summer of 1073, Godfrey the Hunchback returned to Lorraine alone, losing all hope for a reconciliation by 1074. Matilda wanted to enter in a monastery as a nun. During 1073–1074, she tried in vain to obtain the dissolution of her marriage with the pope; however, Gregory VII needed Godfrey the Hunchback as an ally and was therefore not interested in granting a divorce. At the same time, the pope hoped for Matilda's help with his crusade plans.

Rather than supporting the pope as promised in exchange for preserving his marriage, Godfrey the Hunchback turned his attention to imperial affairs. Meanwhile, the conflict later known as the Investiture Controversy was brewing between Gregory VII and Henry IV, with both men claiming the right to appoint bishops and abbots within the empire. Matilda and Godfrey the Hunchback soon found themselves on opposing sides of the dispute, leading to a further deterioration of their difficult relationship. German chroniclers, writing of the synod held at Worms in January 1076, even suggested that Godfrey the Hunchback inspired an allegation by Henry IV of a licentious affair between Gregory VII and Matilda.

Matilda and Godfrey the Hunchback continued to live separately until her husband was assassinated in Vlaardingen (near Rotterdam) on 26 February 1076. Having been accused the previous month of adultery with the pope, Matilda was suspected of ordering her estranged husband's death. However, she could not have known about the proceedings at the Synod of Worms at the time, since the news took three months to reach the pope. It is more likely that Godfrey the Hunchback was killed at the instigation of an enemy nearer to him. Matilda made no spiritual donations for Godfrey the Hunchback.

== Co-rulership with her mother Beatrice ==
Matilda's bold decision to repudiate her husband came at a cost, but it ensured her independence. Beatrice started preparing Matilda for rule as head of the House of Canossa by holding court jointly with her and, eventually, encouraging her to issue charters under her own authority as countess (comitissa) and duchess (ducatrix). Both mother and daughter tried to be present throughout their territory. In what is now Emilia-Romagna, their position was much more stable than in the southern Apennines, where they could not get their followers behind them despite rich donations. They therefore tried to act as guardians of justice and public order. Matilda's participation is mentioned in seven of the sixteen placita held by Beatrice. Supported by judges, Matilda had already held placitum placita alone. On 7 June 1072, Matilda and her mother presided over the court in favor of the Abbey of San Salvatore in Monte Amiata. On 8 February 1073, Matilda went to Lucca without her mother and presided over the court alone, where she made a donation in favor of the local Monastery of San Salvatore e Santa Giustina. At the instigation of the abbess Eritha, the monastery possessions in Lucca and Villanova near Serchio were secured by the King's ban (Königsbann). For the next six months, Matilda's residence is not known, while her mother took part in the enthronement ceremony for Pope Gregory VII.

Matilda was introduced by her mother to numerous personalities in church reform, especially Pope Gregory VII. She had already met the future pope, then Archdeacon Hildebrand, in the 1060s. During 9–17 March 1074, she met him for the first time after his election as pope. He developed a special relationship of trust with Matilda and Beatrice in the period that followed. However, Beatrice died on 18 April 1076. On 27 August 1077, Matilda donated her town of Scanello and other estates to the extent of 600 mansus near the court to Bishop Landulf and the chapter of Pisa Cathedral as a soul device (Seelgerät) for her and her parents.

The deaths of both her husband and mother within two months considerably augmented Matilda's power. She now was the undisputed heir of all lands allotted to both her parents. Her inheritance could have been threatened had Godfrey the Hunchback survived her mother, but she now enjoyed the privileged status of a widow. It seemed unlikely, however, that Emperor Henry IV would formally invest her with the margraviate.

== Personal rule ==
=== Matilda's role during the Investiture Controversy ===
==== State of Matilda's domains after her accession to power ====
After the death of her mother, Matilda took over her immense paternal inheritance. This was contrary to the provisions of the Salic and Lombard law currently in force in the Kingdom of Italy, according to which Emperor Henry IV would have been the legal heir. In view of the minority of Henry IV and close cooperation with the reform papacy, a lending under imperial law was of secondary importance for the House of Canossa.

Between 1076 and 1080, Matilda travelled to Lorraine to lay claim to her husband's estate in Verdun, which he had willed (along with the rest of his patrimony) to his nephew Godfrey of Bouillon, the son of his sister Ida. Godfrey of Bouillon also disputed Matilda's rights to Stenay and Mosay, which her mother had received as dowry. The quarrel between aunt and nephew over the episcopal county of Verdun was eventually settled by Theoderic, Bishop of Verdun, who enjoyed the right to nominate the counts. He easily found in favor of Matilda, as such a verdict happened to please both Pope Gregory VII and King Henry IV. Matilda then proceeded to invest Verdun to her husband's pro-reform cousin, Albert III of Namur. The deep animosity between Matilda and her nephew is thought to have prevented her from travelling to Jerusalem during the First Crusade that he led in the late 1090s.

==== Efforts to achieve a balance between king and pope ====
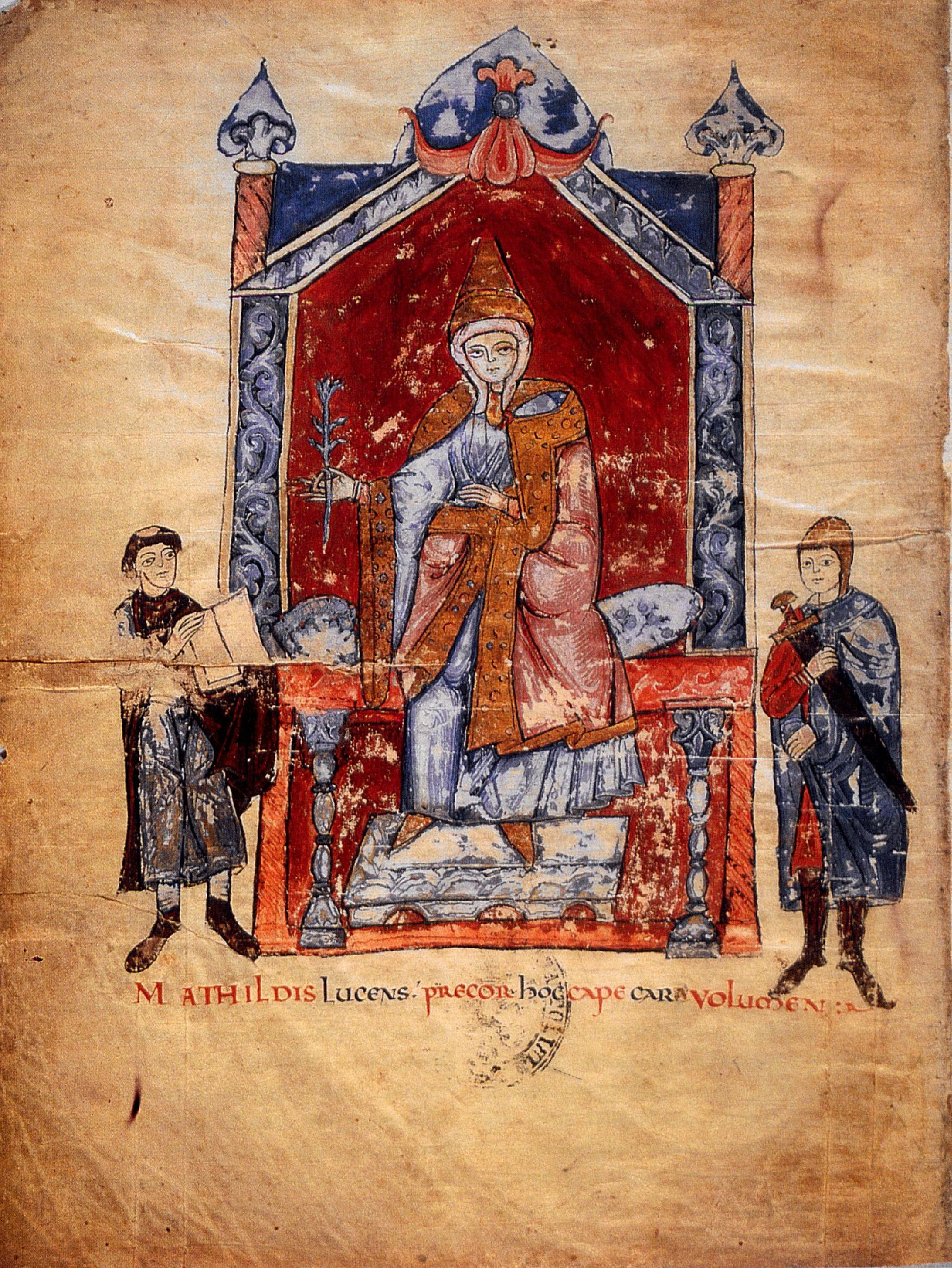
Miniature of Matilda from the frontispiece of Donizo's Vita Mathildis (Vatican Library, Codex Vat. Lat. 4922, fol. 7v). Matilda is depicted seated on a throne. On her right, Donizo is presenting a copy of the Vita Mathildis to her, on her left is a man with a sword (possibly her man-at-arms). The script underneath reads: Mathildis lucens, precor hoc cape cara volumen (Resplendent Matilda, please accept this book, oh you dear one)

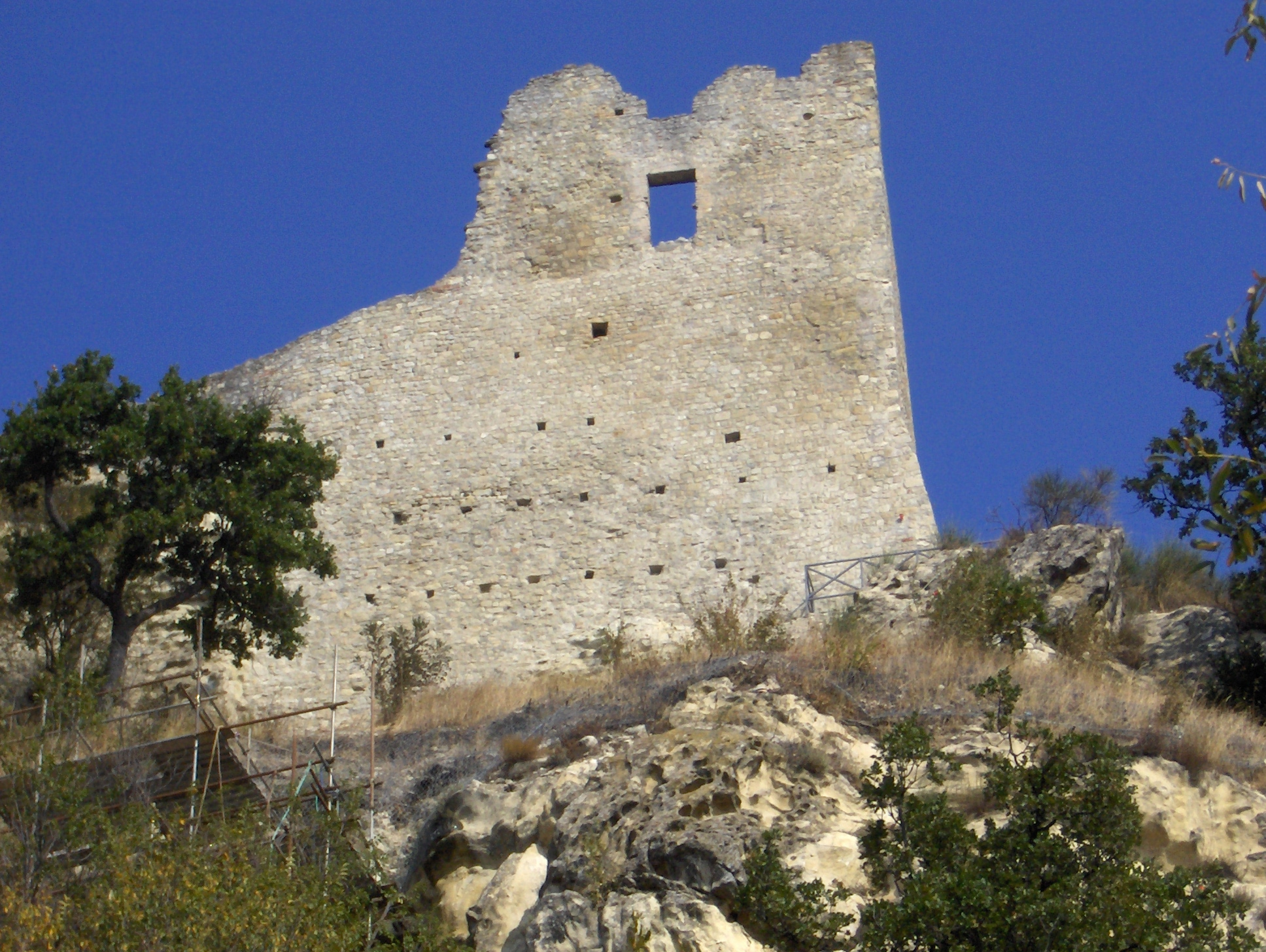
Ruins of the Canossa Castle

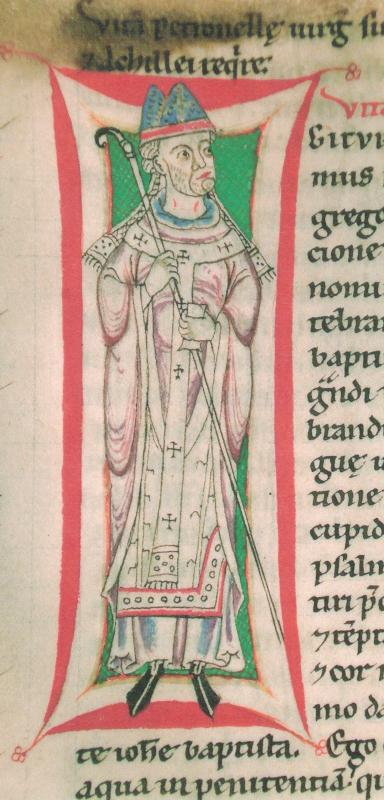
Pope Gregory VII is depicted at the beginning of the Vita Gregorii VII of Pauls von Bernried in the manuscript Heiligenkreuz, Stiftsbibliothek, Cod. 12, fol. 181v

Matilda was a second cousin of Henry IV through their respective grandmothers, sisters Matilda of Swabia and Empress Gisela. Because of her family ties to the Salian dynasty, she was suitable for a mediator role between the Emperor and the Holy See. Matilda's mother died at the time when the conflict between King Henry IV and Pope Gregory VII was escalating. Matilda and Beatrice were among the closest confidants of Gregory VII. From the beginning, he took both into his confidence and let them know about his plans against the Roman-German king.

The disagreement between Pope Gregory VII and King Henry IV culminated in the aftermath of the synod of Worms on 24 January 1076; together with the Archbishops Siegfried of Mainz and Udo of Trier and 24 bishops, the king formulated drastic accusations against Gregory VII. The allegations included Gregory VII's election (which was described as illegitimate), the government of the Church through a "women's senate", and that "he shared a table with a strange woman and housed her, more familiar than necessary." The contempt expressed was so immense that Matilda was not even called by name. The pope responded on 15 February 1076 with the excommunication of the king, releasing all his subjects from the oath of allegiance to him and providing the perfect reason for rebellion against his rule. These measures had a tremendous effect on contemporaries, as the words of the chronicler Bonizo of Sutri show: "When the news of the banishment of the king reached the ears of the people, our whole world trembled".

Insubordinate southern German princes gathered in Trebur, awaiting the pope. Matilda's first military endeavor, as well as the first major task altogether as ruler, turned out to be protecting the pope during his perilous journey north. Gregory VII could rely on nobody else. As the sole heiress to the House of Canossa patrimony, Matilda controlled all the Apennine passes and nearly all the rest that connected central Italy to the north. The Lombard bishops, who were also excommunicated for taking part in the synod and whose sees bordered Matilda's domain, were keen to capture the pope. Gregory VII was aware of the danger, and recorded that all his advisors except Matilda counselled him against travelling to Trebur.

Henry IV had other plans, however. He decided to descend into Italy and intercept Gregory VII, who was thus delayed. The German princes held a separate council and informed the king that he had to submit to the pope within a year or be replaced. Henry IV's predecessors had dealt easily with troublesome pontiffs — they had simply deposed them, and the excommunicated Lombard bishops rejoiced at this prospect. When Matilda heard about Henry IV's approach, she urged Gregory VII to take refuge in the Canossa Castle, her family's eponymous stronghold. The pope took her advice.

It soon became clear that the intention behind Henry's walk to Canossa was to show penance. By 25 January 1077, the king stood barefoot in the snow before the gates of Matilda's castle, accompanied by his wife Bertha of Savoy, their infant son Conrad, and Bertha's mother, the powerful Margravine Adelaide of Susa (Matilda's second cousin; Adelaide's grandmother was Prangarda, sister of Tedald of Canossa, Matilda's paternal grandfather). Since Matilda's castle became the setting for the reconciliation between the emperor and the pope, she must have been very closely involved in the negotiations. The king remained there, in a penitent's robe, barefoot, and without a sign of authority, despite the winter cold, until 28 January, when Matilda convinced the pope to see him. Matilda and Adelaide brokered a deal between the men.

Henry IV was taken back into the Church, with both Matilda and Adelaide acting as sponsors and formally swearing to the agreement. For Matilda, the days in Canossa were a challenge. All those arriving had to be accommodated and looked after appropriately. She had to take care of the procurement and storage of food and fodder and the supplies in the middle of winter. After the ban was dissolved, Henry IV stayed in the Po Valley for several months and demonstratively devoted himself to his rulership. Pope Gregory VII stayed in Matilda's castles for the next few months. Henry IV and Matilda never met again in person after the Canossa days. From 1077 to 1080, Matilda followed the usual activities of her rule. In addition to a few donations for the dioceses of Lucca and Mantua, court documents were in dominance.

==== Disputes with Henry IV ====
In 1079, Matilda gave the pope all her domains (the so-called Terre Matildiche), in open defiance of claims by Henry IV as both the overlord of some of those domains and as one of her close relatives. One year later, the fortunes of papacy and empire turned again. At the Roman synod of Lent in early March 1080, Henry IV was again excommunicated by Gregory VII. The pope combined the anathem with a warning: if the king did not submit to the papal authority by 1 August, he should be dethroned. However, unlike previously, the German bishops and princes stood behind Henry IV. In Brixen on 25 June 1080, seven German, one Burgundian, and 20 Italian bishops decided to depose Gregory VII and nominated Archbishop Guibert of Ravenna as pope, who took the name of Clement III.

The break between the empire and the papacy also escalated the troubled relationship between Henry IV and Matilda. In September 1080, the Margravine stood on behalf of Bishop Gratianus of Ferrara to court. Marquis Azzo d'Este, Counts Ugo and Ubert, Albert (son of Count Boso), Paganus di Corsina, Fulcus de Rovereto, Gerardo di Corviago, Petrus de Ermengarda, and Ugo Armatus all met there. Matilda swore there to maintain the upcoming fight against Henry IV. On 15 October 1080 at Volta Mantovana, the imperial troops defeated the army of Matilda and Gregory VII in battle. Some Tuscan nobles took advantage of the uncertainty and positioned themselves against Matilda; few places remained faithful to her. In a donation of 9 December 1080 to the Modenese monastery of San Prospero, only a few local followers are named.

Matilda, however, did not surrender. While Gregory VII was forced into exile, by retaining control over all the western passes in the Apennines, she could force Henry IV to approach Rome via Ravenna; even with this route open, the emperor would find it hard to besiege Rome with a hostile territory at his back. In December 1080, the citizens of Lucca, then the capital of Tuscany, had revolted and driven out her ally, Bishop Anselm. She is believed to have commissioned the renowned Ponte della Maddalena where the Via Francigena crosses the river Serchio at Borgo a Mozzano just north of Lucca.

Henry IV crossed the Alps in the spring of 1081. He gave up his previous reluctance toward his cousin Matilda and honored the city of Lucca for their transfer to the royal side. On 23 June 1081, the king issued the citizens of Lucca a comprehensive privilege in the army camp outside Rome. By granting special urban rights, the king intended to weaken Matilda's rule. In July 1081 at a synod in Lucca, Henry IV—on account of her 1079 donation to the Church—imposed an Imperial ban upon Matilda, and all her domains were forfeit, although this was not enough to eliminate her as a source of trouble, for she retained substantial allodial holdings. The consequences for Matilda, however, were relatively minor in Italy, but she suffered losses in her far-away Lorraine possessions. On 1 June 1085, Henry IV gave Matilda's domains Stenay and Mosay to Bishop Dietrich of Verdun.

Matilda remained Pope Gregory VII's chief intermediary for communication with northern Europe even as he lost control of Rome and was holed up in the Castel Sant'Angelo. After Henry IV obtained possession of the pope's seal, Matilda wrote to supporters in Germany only to trust papal messages that came through her.

A guerrilla war developed that Matilda waged from her castles in the Apennines. In 1082, she was apparently insolvent. Therefore, she could no longer bind her vassals to her with generous gifts or fiefs. But even in dire straits, she did not let up in her zeal for the reform papacy. Although also a supporter of church reform, her mother had distanced herself from Gregory VII's revolutionary goals where these endangered the foundations of her rule structures. In this setting, mother and daughter differed significantly from one another. Matilda had the church treasure of the Apollonius monastery built near Canossa Castle melted down; precious metal vessels and other treasures from Nonantola Abbey also were melted down. She even sold her Allod city of Donceel to the Abbey of Saint-Jacques in Liège. All the proceeds were made available to the pope. The royal side of the dispute then accused her of plundering churches and monasteries. Pisa and Lucca sided with Henry IV. As a result, Matilda lost two of her most important pillars of power in Tuscany. She had to stand by and watch as anti-Gregorian bishops were installed in several places.

Henry IV's control of Rome enabled him to enthrone Antipope Clement III, who, in turn, crowned him emperor. After this, Henry IV returned to Germany, leaving it to his allies to attempt Matilda's dispossession. These attempts foundered after Matilda (with help of the city of Bologna) defeated them at Sorbara near Modena on 2 July 1084. In the battle, Matilda was able to capture Bishop Bernardo of Parma and make him a hostage. By 1085, Archbishop Tedaldo of Milan and the Bishops Gandolfo of Reggio Emilia and Bernardo of Parma, all members of the pro-imperial party, were dead. Matilda took this opportunity and filled the Bishoprics sees in Modena, Reggio, and Pistoia with church reformers again.

Gregory VII died on 25 May 1085, and Matilda's forces, with those of Prince Jordan I of Capua (her off and on again enemy), took to the field in support of a new pope, Victor III. In 1087, Matilda led an expedition to Rome in an attempt to install Victor III, but the strength of the imperial counterattack soon convinced the pope to withdraw from the city.

On his third expedition to Italy, Henry IV besieged Mantua and attacked Matilda's sphere of influence. In April 1091, he was able to take the city after an eleven-month siege. In the following months, the emperor achieved further successes against the vassals of the Margravine. In the summer of 1091, he managed to get the entire north area of the Po with the Counties of Mantua, Brescia, and Verona under his control. In 1092, Henry IV was able to conquer most of the counties of Modena and Reggio. The Monastery of San Benedetto in Polirone suffered severe damages in the course of the military conflict so that on 5 October 1092, Matilda gave the monastery the churches of San Prospero, San Donino in Monte Uille, and San Gregorio in Antognano to compensate. Matilda had a meeting with her few remaining faithful allies in the late summer of 1092 at Carpineti. The majority of them were in favor of peace. Only the hermit Johannes from Marola strongly advocated a continuation of the fight against the emperor. Thereupon Matilda implored her followers not to give up the fight. The imperial army began to siege Canossa in the autumn of 1092, but withdrew after a sudden failure of the siege; after this defeat, Henry IV's influence in Italy was never recovered.

In the 1090s Henry IV increasingly went on the defensive. A coalition of the southern German princes had prevented him from returning to the empire over the Alpine passes. For several years, the emperor remained inactive in the area around Verona.

In the spring of 1093, Conrad, his eldest son and heir to the throne, fell from him. With the support of Matilda along with the Patarene-minded cities of northern Italy (Cremona, Lodi, Milan, and Piacenza), the prince rebelled against his father. Sources close to the emperor saw Matilda's influence on Conrad as the reason for the rebellion of the son against his father, but contemporary sources do not reveal any closer contact between the two before the rebellion. A little later, Conrad was taken prisoner by his father, but with Matilda's help, he was freed. With the support of the Margravine, Conrad was crowned King of Italy by Archbishop Anselm III of Milan before 4 December 1093. Together with the pope, Matilda organized the marriage of King Conrad with Maximilla, daughter of Count Roger I of Sicily. This was intended to win the support of the Normans of southern Italy against Henry IV. Conrad's initiatives to expand his rule in northern Italy probably led to tensions with Matilda, and for this, he did not find any more support for his rule. After 22 October 1097, his political activity was virtually ended, his death in the summer of 1101 from a fever being the only mention.

In 1094, Henry IV's second wife, the Rurikid princess Eupraxia of Kiev (renamed Adelaide after her marriage), escaped from her imprisonment at the monastery of San Zeno and spread serious allegations against him. Henry IV then had her arrested in Verona. With the help of Matilda, Adelaide was able to escape again and find refuge with her. At the beginning of March 1095, Pope Urban II called the Council of Piacenza under the protection of Matilda. There, Adelaide appeared and made a public confession about Henry IV "because of the unheard-of atrocities of fornication which she had endured with her husband": she accused Henry IV of forcing her to participate in orgies, and, according to some later accounts, of attempting a black mass on her naked body. Thanks to these scandals and division within the Imperial family, the prestige and power of Henry IV was increasingly weakened. After the synod, Matilda no longer had any contact with Adelaide.

==== Second marriage: Welf V of Bavaria ====
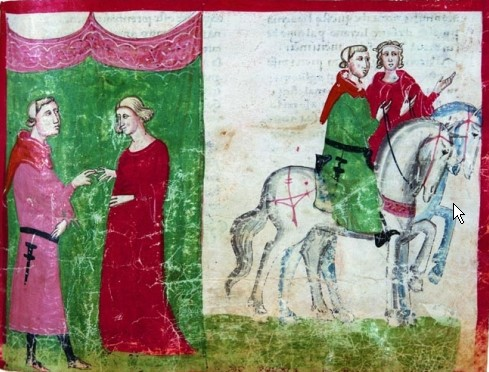
Matilda weds Welf V (l), (r) she and her new husband ride to view her property. Illumination from the fourteenth century in a manuscript of the Nuova Chronica by Giovanni Villani. Vatican Library, Chigi LVIII 296, fol. 56r

In 1088, Matilda was facing a new attempt at invasion by Henry IV and decided to pre-empt it by means of a political marriage. In 1089, in her early forties, she married Welf V, heir to the Duchy of Bavaria. He was probably fifteen to seventeen years old at the time, but no contemporary sources draws attention to the great age difference. The marriage was probably concluded at the instigation of Pope Urban II in order to isolate Henry IV politically; the Welf dynasty had provided important supporters of the papacy from the eleventh to the fifteenth centuries in their conflict with the German emperors (see Guelphs and Ghibellines). Matilda's motive for consenting to the marriage, despite the large difference in age, may also have been the hope for offspring: late pregnancy was quite possible, as the example of Constance of Sicily showed.

Matilda sent an army of thousands to the border of Lombardy to escort her bridegroom, welcomed him with honors, and, after the marriage (mid-1089), she organized 120 days of wedding festivities of such splendor that those of any other medieval rulers paled in comparison. Cosmas of Prague reported that for two nights after the wedding, Welf V, fearing witchcraft, refused to share the marital bed. The third day, Matilda appeared naked on a table especially prepared on sawhorses and told him that "everything is in front of you and there is no hidden malice". But the Duke was dumbfounded; Matilda, furious, slapped him and spat in his face, taunting him: "Get out of here, monster, you don't deserve our kingdom, you vile thing, viler than a worm or a rotten seaweed, don't let me see you again, or you'll die a miserable death"....

Despite the reportedly bad beginning of their marriage, Welf V is documented at least three times as Matilda's consort. By the spring of 1095, the couple were separated. In April 1095, Welf V had signed Matilda's donation charter for Piadena, but another diploma dated 21 May 1095 was already issued by Matilda alone. Thereafter, Welf V's name no longer appears in any of the Mathildic documents. As a father-in-law, Welf IV tried to reconcile the couple; he was primarily concerned with the possible inheritance of the childless Matilda. The couple was never divorced, nor was the marriage declared invalid.

==== Final defeat of Henry IV and new room for maneuvers for Matilda ====
With the de facto end of Matilda's marriage, Henry IV regained his capacity to act. Welf IV switched to the imperial side. The emperor, locked in Verona, was finally able to return to the north of the Alps in 1097. After that, he never returned to Italy, and it would be 13 years before his son and namesake, Henry V, set foot on Italian soil for the first time. With the assistance of the French armies heading off to the First Crusade, Matilda was finally able to restore Pope Urban II to Rome. She ordered or led successful expeditions against Ferrara (1101), Parma (1104), Prato (1107), and Mantua (1114).

In eleventh-century Italy, the rise of the cities began in interaction with the overarching conflict. They soon succeeded in establishing their own territories. In Lucca, Pavia, and Pisa, consuls appeared as early as the 1080s, which are considered to be signs of the legal independence of the "communities". Pisa sought its advantage in changing alliances with the Salian dynasty and the House of Canossa. Lucca remained completely closed to the Margravine from 1081. It was not until Allucione de Luca's marriage to the daughter of the royal judge Flaipert that she gained new opportunities to influence. Flaipert had already been one of the most important advisors of the House of Canossa since the times of Matilda's mother. Allucione was a vassal of Count Guidi, with whom Matilda worked closely. Mantua had to make considerable concessions in June 1090; the inhabitants of the city and the suburbs were freed from all "unjustified" oppression and all rights and property in Sacca, Sustante and Corte Carpaneta were confirmed.

After 1096, the balance of power slowly began to change again in favor of the Margravine. Matilda resumed her donations to ecclesiastical and social institutions in Lombardy, Emilia, and Tuscany. In the summer of 1099 and 1100, her route first led to Lucca and Pisa. There it can be detected again in the summer of 1105, 1107, and 1111. In early summer of 1099, she gave the Monastery of San Ponziano a piece of land for the establishment of a hospital. With this donation, Matilda resumed her relations with Lucca.

After 1090, Matilda accentuated the consensual rule. After the profound crises, she was no longer able to make political decisions on her own. She held meetings with spiritual and secular nobles in Tuscany and also in her home countries of Emilia. She had to take into account the ideas of her loyal friends and come to an agreement with them. In her role as the most important guarantor of the law, she increasingly lost importance in relation to the bishops. They repeatedly asked the Margravine to put an end to grievances. As a result, the bishops expanded their position within the episcopal cities and in the surrounding area. After 1100, Matilda had to repeatedly protect churches from her own subjects.

=== Court culture and rulership ===
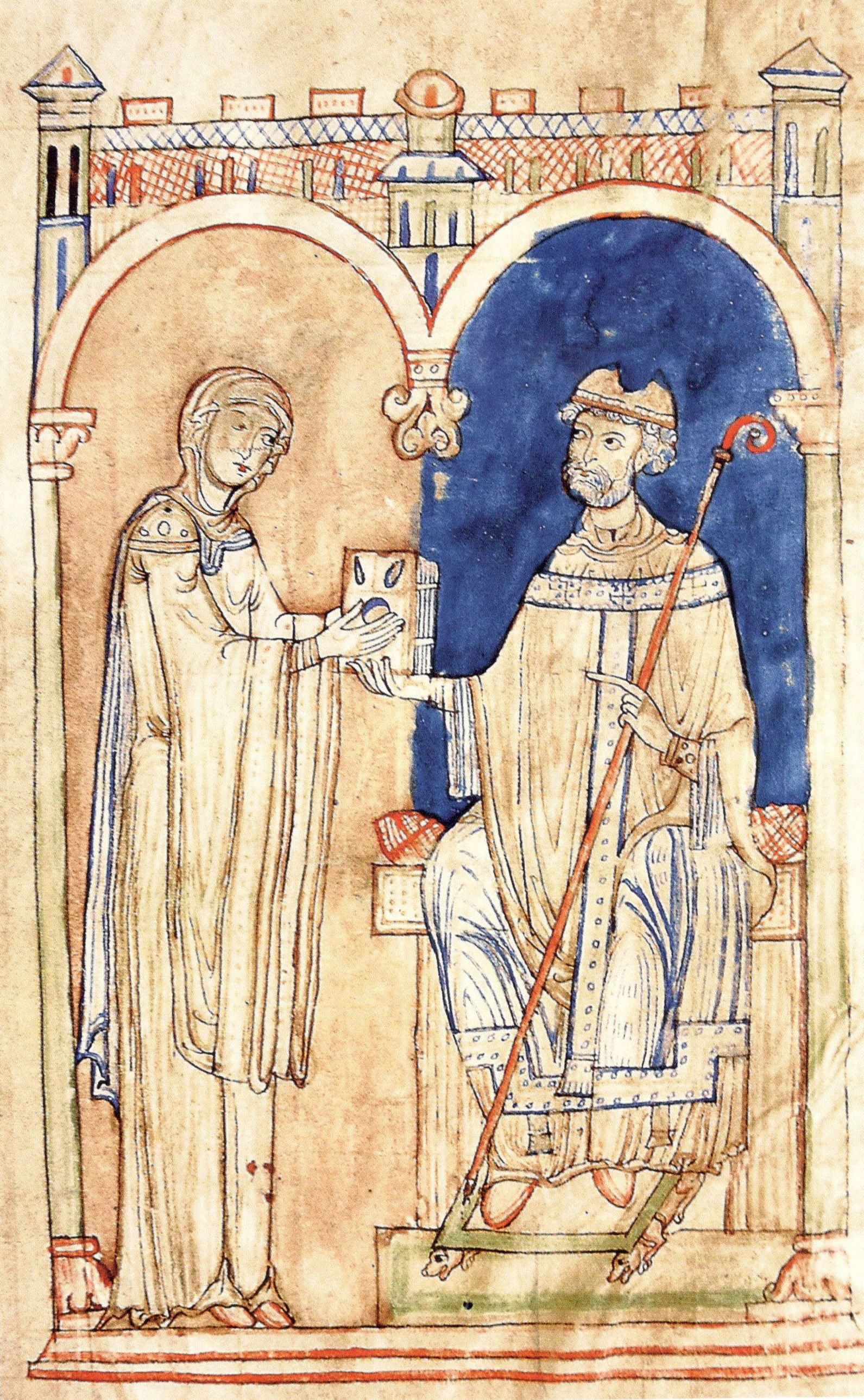
Matilda receiving a manuscript from scholar Anselm of Canterbury. Miniature in a manuscript by Anselm's Orationes (Diocese of Salzburg, around 1160). Admont, Abbey Library, Ms. 289, fol. 1v

The court had developed since the twelfth century to a central institution of royal and princely power. The most important tasks were the visualization of the rule through festivals, art, and literature. The term "court" can be understood as "presence with the ruler". In contrast to the Brunswick court of the Guelphs, Matilda's court offices cannot be verified. Scholars such as Anselm of Lucca, Heribert of Reggio, and Johannes of Mantua were around the Margravine. Matilda encouraged some of them to write their works, for example, Bishop Anselm of Lucca wrote a psalter at her request and Johannes of Mantua a commentary on the Song of Songs and a reflection on the life of Virgin Mary. Works were dedicated or presented to Matilda, such as the Liber de anulo et baculo of Rangerius of Lucca, the Orationes sive meditationes of Anselm of Canterbury, the Vita Mathildis of Donizo, the miracle reports of Ubald of Mantua and the Liber ad amicum of Bonizo of Sutri. Matilda contributed to the distribution of the books intended for her by making copies. More works were dedicated only to Henry IV among their direct contemporaries. As a result, the Margravine court temporarily became the most important non-royal spiritual center of the Salian period. It also served as a contact point for displaced Gregorians in the church political disputes. Historian Paolo Golinelli interpreted the repeated admission of high-ranking refugees and their care as an act of charity. As the last political expellee, she granted asylum for a long time to Archbishop Conrad I of Salzburg, the pioneer of the canon reform. This brought her into close contact with this reform movement.

Matilda regularly sought the advice of learned lawyers when making court decisions. A large number of legal advisors are named in their documents. There are 42 causidici, 29 iudices sacri palatii, 44 iudices, 8 legis doctores, and 42 advocati. According to historian Elke Goez, Matilda's court can be described as "a focal point for the use of learned jurists in the case law by lay princes". Matilda encouraged these scholars and drew them to her court. According to Goez, the administration of justice was not a scholarly end in itself, but served to increase the efficiency of rulership. Goez sees a legitimation deficit as the most important trigger for the Margravine's intensive administration of justice, since Matilda was never formally invested by the king. In Tuscany in particular, an intensive administration of justice can be documented with almost 30 placitum. Matilda's involvement in the founding of the Bolognese School of Law, which has been suspected again and again, is viewed by Elke Goez as unlikely. According to chronicler Burchard of Ursperg, the alleged founder of this school, Irnerius, produced an authentic text of the Roman legal sources on behalf of Margravine Matilda. According to historian Johannes Fried, this can at best affect the referring to the Vulgate version of the Digest, and even that is considered unlikely. The role of this scholar in Matilda's environment is controversial. According to historian Wulf Eckart Voss, Irnerius had been a legal advisor since 1100. In an analysis of the documentary mentions, however, Gundula Grebner came to the conclusion that this scholar should not be classified in the circle of Matilda, but in that of Henry V.

Until well into the fourteenth century, medieval rule was exercised through itinerant court practice. There was neither a capital nor did the rulers of the House of Canossa have a preferred place of residence. Rule in the High Middle Ages was based on presence. Matilda's domains comprised most of what is now the dual region of Emilia-Romagna and part of Tuscany. She traveled in her domains in all seasons, and was never alone in this. There were always a number of advisors, clergy, and armed men in their vicinity that could not be precisely estimated. She maintained a special relationship of trust with Bishop Anselm of Lucca, who was her closest advisor until his death in May 1086. In the later years of her life, cardinal legates often stayed in her vicinity. They arranged for communication with the pope. The Margravine had a close relationship with the cardinal legates Bernard degli Uberti and Bonsignore of Reggio. In view of the rigors of travel domination, according to Elke Goez's judgment, she must have been athletic, persistent, and capable. The distant possessions brought a considerable administrative burden and were often threatened with takeover by rivals. Therefore, Matilda had to count on local confidants, in whose recruitment she was supported by Pope Gregory VII.

In a rulership without a permanent residence, the visualization of rulership and the representation of rank were of great importance. From Matilda's reign there are 139 documents (74 of which are original), four letters, and 115 lost documents (Deperdita). The largest proportion of the number of documents are donations to ecclesiastical recipients (45) and court documents (35). In terms of the spatial distribution of the documentary tradition, Northern Italy predominates (82). Tuscany and the neighboring regions (49) are less affected, while Lorraine has only five documents. There is thus a unique tradition for a princess of the High Middle Ages; a comparable number of documents only come back for the time being Henry the Lion five decades later. At least 18 of Matilda's documents were sealed. At the time, this was unusual for lay princes in imperial Italy. There were very few women who had their own seal: the Margravine had two seals of different pictorial types —one shows a female bust with loose, falling hair, while the second seal from the year 1100 is an antique gem and not a portrait of Matilda and Godfrey the Hunchback or Welf V. Matilda's chancellery for issuing the diplomas on their own can be excluded with high probability. To consolidate her rule and as an expression of the understanding of rule, Matilda referred in her title to her powerful father; it was called filia quondam magni Bonifatii ducis.

The castles in their domain and high church festivals also served to visualize the rule. Matilda celebrated Easter as the most important act of power representation in Pisa in 1074. Matilda's pictorial representations also belong in this context, some of which are controversial, however. The statue of the so-called Bonissima on the Palazzo Comunale, the cathedral square of Modena, was probably made in the 1130s at the earliest. The Margravine's mosaic in the church of Polirone was also made after her death. Matilda had her ancestors put in splendid coffins. However, she did not succeed in bringing together all the remains of her ancestors to create a central point of reference for rule and memory: her grandfather remained buried in Brescello, while the remains of her father were kept in Mantua and those of her mother in Pisa. Their withdrawal would have meant a political retreat and the loss of Pisa and Mantua.

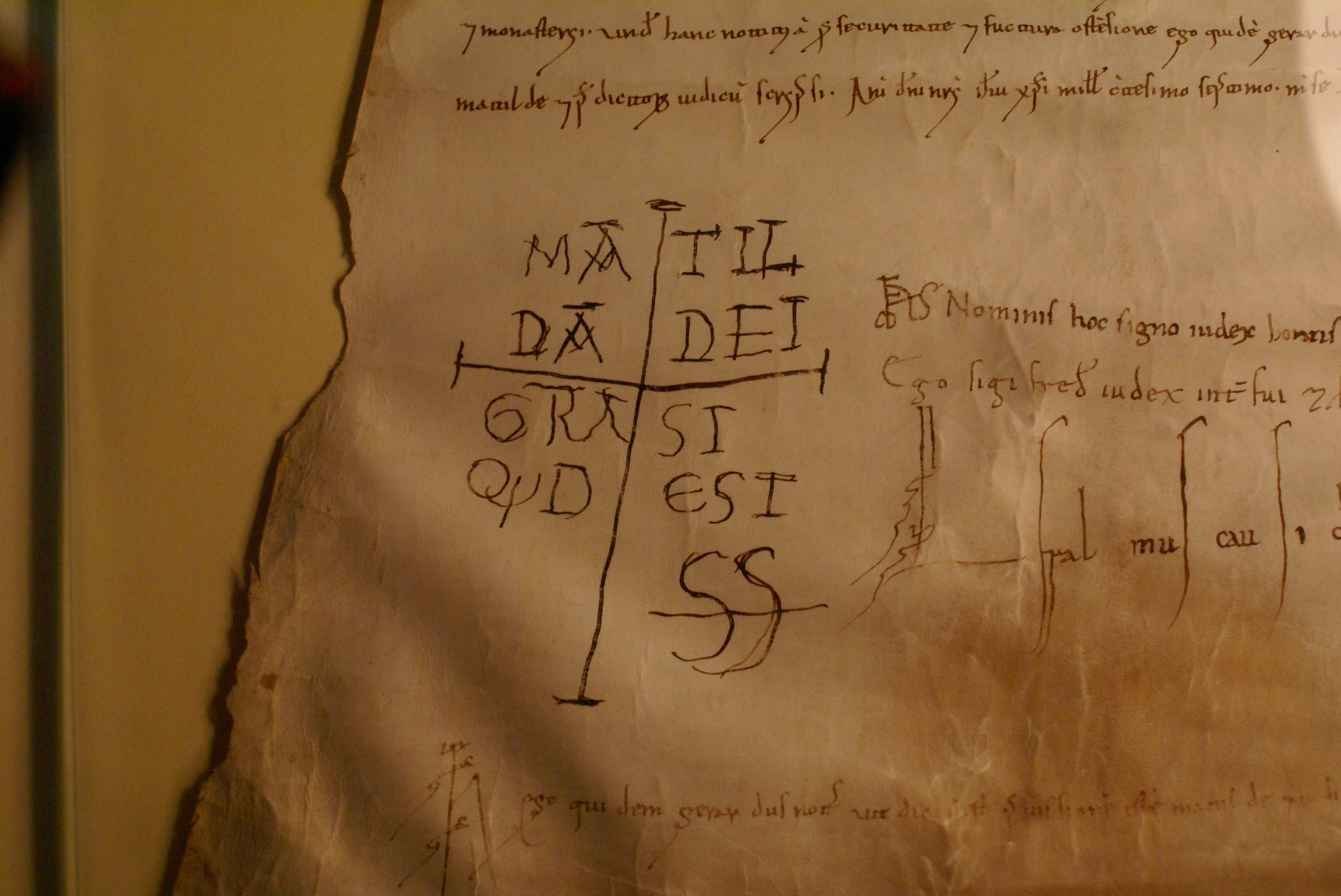
Matilda's signature ("Matilda, Dei gratia si quid est"), quite tremulous due to her old age. Notitia Confirmationis (Prato, June 1107), Archivio Storico Diocesano of Lucca, Diplomatico Arcivescovile, perg. ++ I29

By using the written form, Matilda supplemented the presence of the immediate presence of power in all parts of her sphere of influence. In her great courts she used the script to increase the income from her lands. Scripture-based administration was still a very unusual means of realizing rule for lay princes in the eleventh century.

In the years from 1081 to 1098, however, the rule of the House of Canossa was in a crisis. The documentary and letter transmission is largely suspended for this period. A total of only 17 pieces have survived, not a single document from eight years. After this finding Matilda was not in Tuscany for almost twenty years. However, from autumn 1098 she was able to regain a large part of her lost territories. This increased interest in receiving certificates from her. Ninety-four documents have survived from the last 20 years. Matilda tried to consolidate her rule with the increased use of writing. After the death of her mother (18 April 1076), she often provided her documents with the phrase "Matilda Dei gratia si quid est" ("Matilda, by God's grace, if she is something"). The personal combination of symbol (cross) and text was unique in the personal execution of the certificates. By referring to the immediacy of God, she wanted to legitimize her contestable position. There is no consensus in research about the meaning of the qualifying suffix "si quid est". This formulation, which can be found in 38 original and 31 copiously handed down texts by the Margravine, ultimately remains as puzzling as it is singular in terms of tradition. One possible explanation for their use is that Matilda was never formally invested with the Margraviate of Tuscany by the king. Like her mother, Matilda carried out all kinds of legal transactions without mentioning her husbands and thus with full independence. Both princesses took over the official titles of their husbands, but refrained from masculinizing their titles.

=== Patronage of churches and hospitals ===
After the discovery of contemporary diplomas, Elke Goez refuted the widespread notion that the Margravine had given churches and monasteries rich gifts at all times of her life. Very few donations were initially made. Already one year after the death of her mother, Matilda lost influence on the inner-city monasteries in Tuscany and thus an important pillar of her rule.

The issuing of deeds for monasteries concentrated on convents that were located in Matilda's immediate sphere of influence in northern and central Italy or Lorraine. The main exception to this was Montecassino. Among the most important of her numerous donations to monasteries and churches were those to Fonte Avellana, Farfa, Montecassino, Vallombrosa, Nonantola, and Polirone. In this way she secured the financing of the old church buildings. She often stipulated that the proceeds from the donated land should be used to build churches in the center of the episcopal cities. This money was an important contribution to the funds for the expansion and decoration of the churches of San Pietro in Mantua, Santa Maria Assunta e San Geminiano of Modena, Santa Maria Assunta of Parma, San Martino of Lucca, Santa Maria Assunta of Pisa, and Santa Maria Assunta of Volterra.

Matilda supported the construction of Pisa Cathedral with several donations (in 1083, 1100, and 1103). Her name should be permanently associated with the cathedral building project. They released Nonantola from paying tithes to the Bishop of Modena; the funds thus freed up could be used for the monastery buildings. In Modena, with her participation, she secured the continued construction of the cathedral. Matilda acted as mediator in the dispute between cathedral canons and citizens about the remains of Saint Geminianus. The festive consecration could take place in 1106, with the Relatio fundationis cathedralis Mutinae recording these processes. Matilda is presented as a political authority: she is present with an army, gives support, recommends receiving the pope, and reappears for the ordination, during which she dedicates immeasurable gifts to the patron.

Numerous examples show that Matilda made donations to bishops who were loyal to the Gregorian reforms. In May 1109 she gave land in the area of Ferrara to the Gregorian Bishop Landolfo of Ferrara in San Cesario sul Panaro and in June of the same year possessions in the vicinity of Ficarolo. The Bishop Wido of Ferrara, however, was hostile to Pope Gregory VII and had written De scismate Hildebrandi against him. The siege of Ferrara undertaken by Matilda in 1101 led to the expulsion of the schismatic bishop.

On the other hand, nothing is known of Matilda's sponsorship of nunneries. Their only relevant intervention concerned the Benedictine nuns of San Sisto of Piacenza, whom they chased out of the monastery for their immoral behavior and replaced with monks.

Matilda founded and sponsored numerous hospitals to care for the poor and pilgrims. For the hospitals, she selected municipal institutions and important Apennine passes. The welfare institutions not only fulfilled charitable tasks, but were also important for the legitimation and consolidation of the margravial rule.

Some churches traditionally said to have been founded by Matilda include: Sant'Andrea Apostolo of Vitriola in Montefiorino (Modena); Sant'Anselmo in Pieve di Coriano (Province of Mantua); San Giovanni Decollato in Pescarolo ed Uniti (Cremona); Santa Maria Assunta in Monteveglio (Bologna); San Martino in Barisano near Forlì; San Zeno in Cerea (Verona), and San Salvaro in Legnago (Verona).

=== Adoption of Guido Guidi around 1099 ===
In the later years of her life, Matilda was increasingly faced with the question of who should take over the House of Canossa's inheritance. She could no longer have children of her own, and apparently for this reason she adopted Guido Guerra, a member of the Guidi family, one of her main supporters in Florence (although in a genealogically strictly way, the Margravine's feudal heirs were the House of Savoy, descendants of Prangarda of Canossa, Matilda's paternal great-aunt). On 12 November 1099, he was referred to in a diploma as Matilda's adopted son (adoptivus filius domine comitisse Matilde). With his consent, Matilda renewed and expanded a donation from her ancestors to the Brescello monastery. However, this is the only time that Guido had the title of adoptive son (adoptivus filius) in a document that was considered to be authentic. At that time, there were an unusually large number of vassals in Matilda's environment. In March 1100, the Margravine and Guido Guerra took part in a meeting of abbots of the Vallombrosians Order, which they both sponsored. On 19 November 1103 they gave the monastery of Vallombrosa possessions on both sides of the Vicano and half of the castle of Magnale with the town of Pagiano. After Matilda had bequeathed her property to the Apostolic See in 1102 (so-called second "Matildine Donation"), Guido withdrew from her. With the donation he lost hope of the inheritance. However, he signed three more documents with Matilda for the Abbey of Polirone.

From these sources, Elke Goez, for example, concludes that Guido Guerra was adopted by Matilda. According to her, the Margravine must have consulted with her loyal followers beforehand and reached a consensus for this far-reaching political decision. Ultimately, pragmatic reasons were decisive: Matilda needed a political and economic administrator for Tuscany. The Guidi family estates in the north and east of Florence were also a useful addition to the House of Canossa possessions. Guido Guerra hoped that Matilda's adoption would not only give him the inheritance, but also an increase in rank. He also hoped for support in the dispute between the Guidi and the Cadolinger families for supremacy in Tuscany. The Cadolinger were named after one of their ancestors, Count Cadalo, who was attested from 952 to 986; they died out in 1113.

Paolo Golinelli doubts this reconstruction of the events. He thinks that Guido Guerra held an important position among the Margravine's vassals, but was not adopted by her. This is supported by the fact that after 1108 he only appeared once as a witness in one of their documents, namely in a document dated 6 May 1115, which Matilda granted in favor of the Abbey of Polirone while she was on her deathbed at Bondeno di Roncore.

=== Matildine Donation ===
On 17 November 1102 Matilda donated her property to the Apostolic See at Canossa Castle in the presence of the Cardinal Legate Bernardo of San Crisogono. This is a renewal of the donation, as the first diploma was allegedly lost. Matilda had initially transferred all of her property to the Apostolic See in the Holy Cross Chapel of the Lateran before Pope Gregory VII. Most research has dated this first donation to the years between 1077 and 1080. Paolo Golinelli spoke out for the period between 1077 and 1081. Werner Goez placed the first donation in the years 1074 and 1075, when Matilda's presence in Rome can be proven. At the second donation, despite the importance of the event, very few witnesses were present. With Atto from Montebaranzone and Bonusvicinus from Canossa, the diploma was attested by two people of no recognizable rank who are not mentioned in any other certificate.

The Matildine Donation caused a sensation in the twelfth century and has also received a lot of attention in research. The entire tradition of the document comes from the curia. According to Paolo Golinelli, the donation of 1102 is a forgery from the 1130s; in reality, Matilda made Henry V her only heir in 1110/11. Even Johannes Laudage in his study of the contemporary sources, thought that the Matildine Donation was spurious. Elke and Werner Goez, on the other hand, viewed the second donation diploma from November 1102 as authentic in their document edition. Bernd Schneidmüller and Elke Goez believe that a diploma was issued about the renewed transfer of the Terre Matildiche out of curial fear of the Welfs. Welf IV died in November 1101. His eldest son and successor Welf V had rulership rights over the House of Canossa domains through his marriage to Matilda. Therefore, reference was made to an earlier award of the inheritance before Matilda's second marriage. Otherwise, given the spouse's considerable influence, their consent should have been obtained.

Werner Goez explains with different ideas about the legal implications of the process that Matilda often had her own property even after 1102 without recognizing any consideration for Rome's rights. Goez observed that the donation is only mentioned in Matildine documents that were created under the influence of papal legates. Matilda didn't want a complete waiver of all other real estates and usable rights and perhaps did not notice how far the consequences of the formulation of the second Matildine Donation went.

=== Last years and death ===
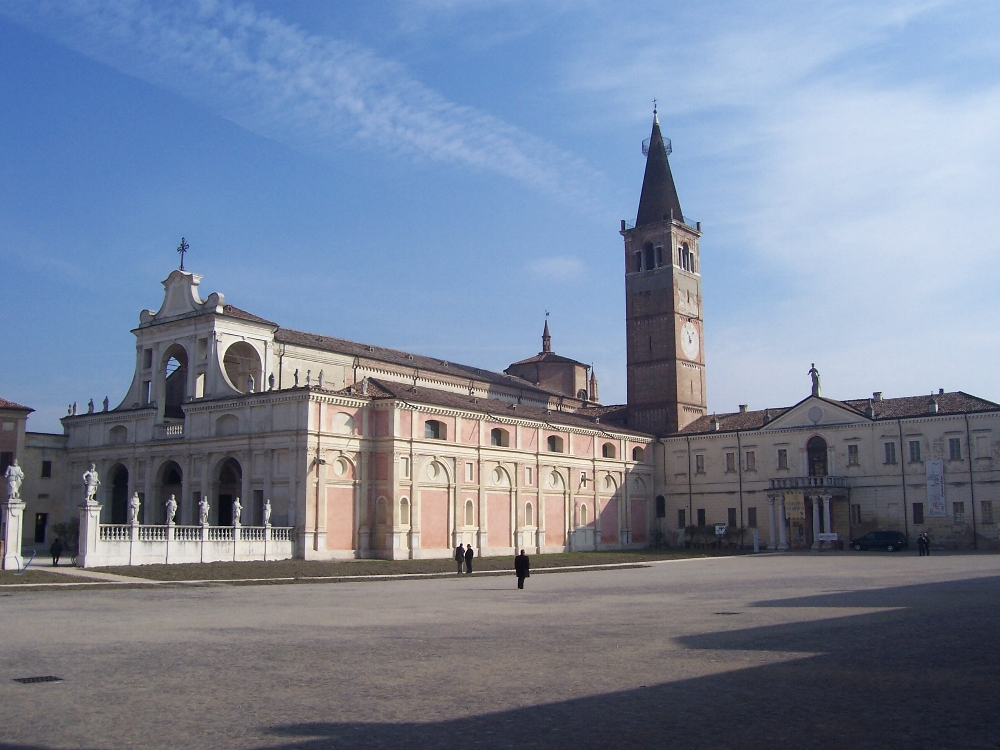
Abbey of San Benedetto in Polirone

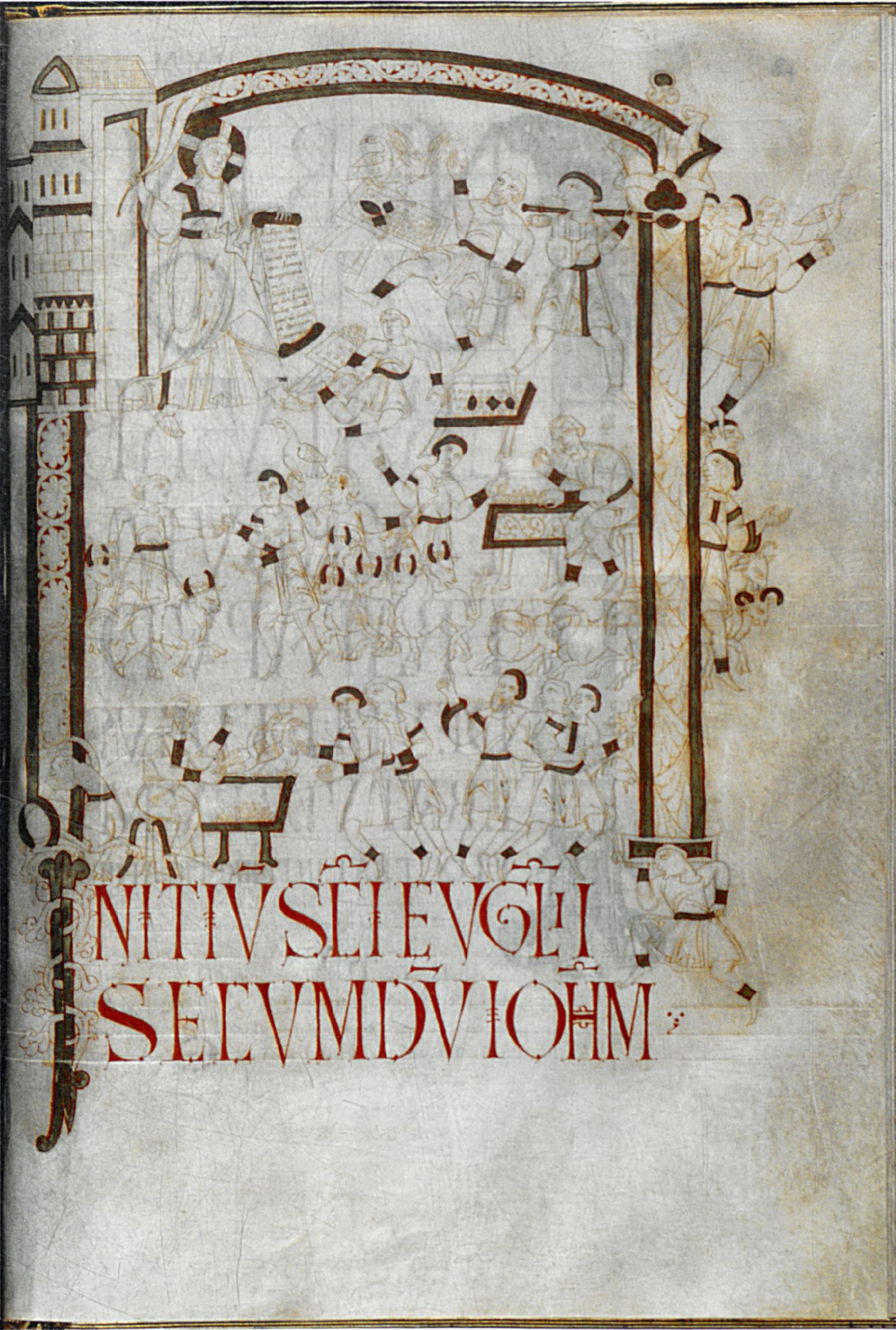
Gospels of Matilda of Tuscany, San Benedetto Po (al Polirone), before 1099. New York, Morgan Library & Museum, MS M.492, fol. 84r

In the last phase of her life, Matilda pursued the plan to strengthen the Abbey of Polirone. The Church of Gonzaga was freed in 1101 from the malos sacerdotes fornicarios et adulteros ("wicked, unchaste, and adulterous priests"), and it was given to the monks of Polirone. The Gonzaga clergy were charged with violating the duty of celibacy, one of the main evils that the church reformers acted against. In the same year, she gave the Abbey of Polirone a poor house that she had built in Mantua; she thus withdrew it from the monks of the monastery of Sant'Andrea in Mantua who had been accused of simony. The Abbey of Polirone received a total of twelve donations in the last five years of Matilda's life. She transferred her property in Villola (16 kilometers southeast of Mantua) and the Insula Sancti Benedicti (an island in the Po, today on the south bank in the area of San Benedetto Po) to this monastery. The Abbey thus rose to become the official monastery of the House of Canossa, with Matilda choosing it as her burial place. The monks used Matilda's generous donations to rebuild the entire Abbey and the main church. Matilda wanted to secure her memory not only through gifts, but also through written memories. Polirone was given a very valuable Gospel manuscript. The book, preserved today in New York, contains a ‘’liber vitae’’, a memorial book, in which all important donors and benefactors of the monastery are listed. This document also deals with Matilda's memorial. The Gospel manuscript was commissioned by the Margravine. It is not clear whether the codex originated in Polirone or was sent there as a gift from Matilda. It is the only larger surviving memorial from a Cluniac monastery in northern Italy. Paolo Golinelli emphasized that, through Matilda's favor, Polirone also became a base where reform forces gathered.

Henry V had been in diplomatic contact with Matilda since 1109. He emphasized his blood relationship with the Margravine and demonstratively cultivated the connection. At his coronation as emperor in 1111, disputes over the investiture question broke out again. Henry V captured Pope Paschal II and some of the cardinals in St. Peter's Basilica and forced his imperial coronation. When Matilda found out about this, she asked for the release of two cardinals, Bernard of Parma and Bonsignore of Reggio, who were close to her. Henry V complied with her request and released both cardinals. Matilda did nothing to get the pope and the other cardinals free. On the way back from the Rome train, Henry V visited the Margravine during 6–11 May 1111 at the Castle of Bianello in Quattro Castella, Reggio Emilia.

Matilda then achieved the solution from the imperial ban imposed to her. According to the unique testimony of her biographer Donizo, Henry V transferred to Matilda the rule of Liguria and crowned her Imperial Vicar and Vice-Queen of Italy. At this meeting he also concluded a firm agreement (firmum foedus) with her, which was mentioned only by Donizo and whose details are unknown. This agreement has been undisputedly interpreted in German historical studies since Wilhelm von Giesebrecht as an inheritance treaty, while Italian historians such as Luigi Simeoni and Werner Goez repeatedly questioned this. Elke Goez, on the other hand, assumed a mutual agreement with benefits from both sides: Matilda, whose health was weakened, probably waived her further support for Pope Paschal II with a view to a good understanding with the emperor. Paolo Golinelli thinks that Matilda recognized Henry V as the heir to her domains and only after this, the imperial ban against Matilda was lifted and she recovered the possessions in the northern Italian parts of the formerly powerful House of Canossa with the exception of Tuscany. Donizo imaginatively embellished this process with the title of Vice-Queen. Some researchers see in the agreement with Henry V a turning away from the ideals of the so-called Gregorian reform, but Enrico Spagnesi emphasizes that Matilda had by no means given up her church reform-minded policy.

A short time after her meeting with Henry V, Matilda retired to Montebaranzone near Prignano sulla Secchia. In Mantua in the summer of 1114, the rumor that she had died sparked jubilation. The Mantuans strived for autonomy and demanded admission to the margravial Rivalta Castle located five kilometers west of Mantua. When the citizens found out that Matilda was still alive, they burned the castle down. Rivalta Castle symbolized the hated power of the Margravine. Donizo, in turn, used this incident as an instrument to illustrate the chaotic conditions that the sheer rumor of Matilda's death could trigger. The Margravine guaranteed peace and security for the population and was able to recapture Mantua. In April 1115, the aging Margravine gave the Church of San Michele in Mantua the rights and income of the Pacengo court. This documented legal transaction proves their intention to win over an important spiritual community in Mantua.

Matilda often visited the town of Bondeno di Roncore (today Bondanazzo), in the district of Reggiolo, Reggio Emilia, just in the middle of the Po valley, where she owned a small castle, which she often visited between 1106 and 1115. During a stay there, she fell seriously ill, so that she could finally no longer leave the castle. In the last months of her life, the sick Margravine was no longer able to travel strenuously. According to Vito Fumagalli, she stayed in the Polirone area not only because of her illness: the House of Canossa had largely been ousted from its previous position of power at the beginning of the twelfth century. In her final hours, the Bishop of Reggio, Cardinal Bonsignore, stayed at her deathbed and gave her the sacraments of death. On the night of 24 July 1115, Matilda died of sudden cardiac arrest at the age of 69. After her death, in 1116, Henry V succeeded in taking possession of the Terre Matildiche without any apparent resistance from the curia. The once loyal subjects of the Margravine accepted the emperor as their new master without resistance; for example, powerful vassals such as Arduin de Palude, Sasso of Bibianello, Count Albert of Sabbioneta, Ariald of Melegnano, Opizo of Gonzaga and many others came to the emperor and accepted him as their overlord.

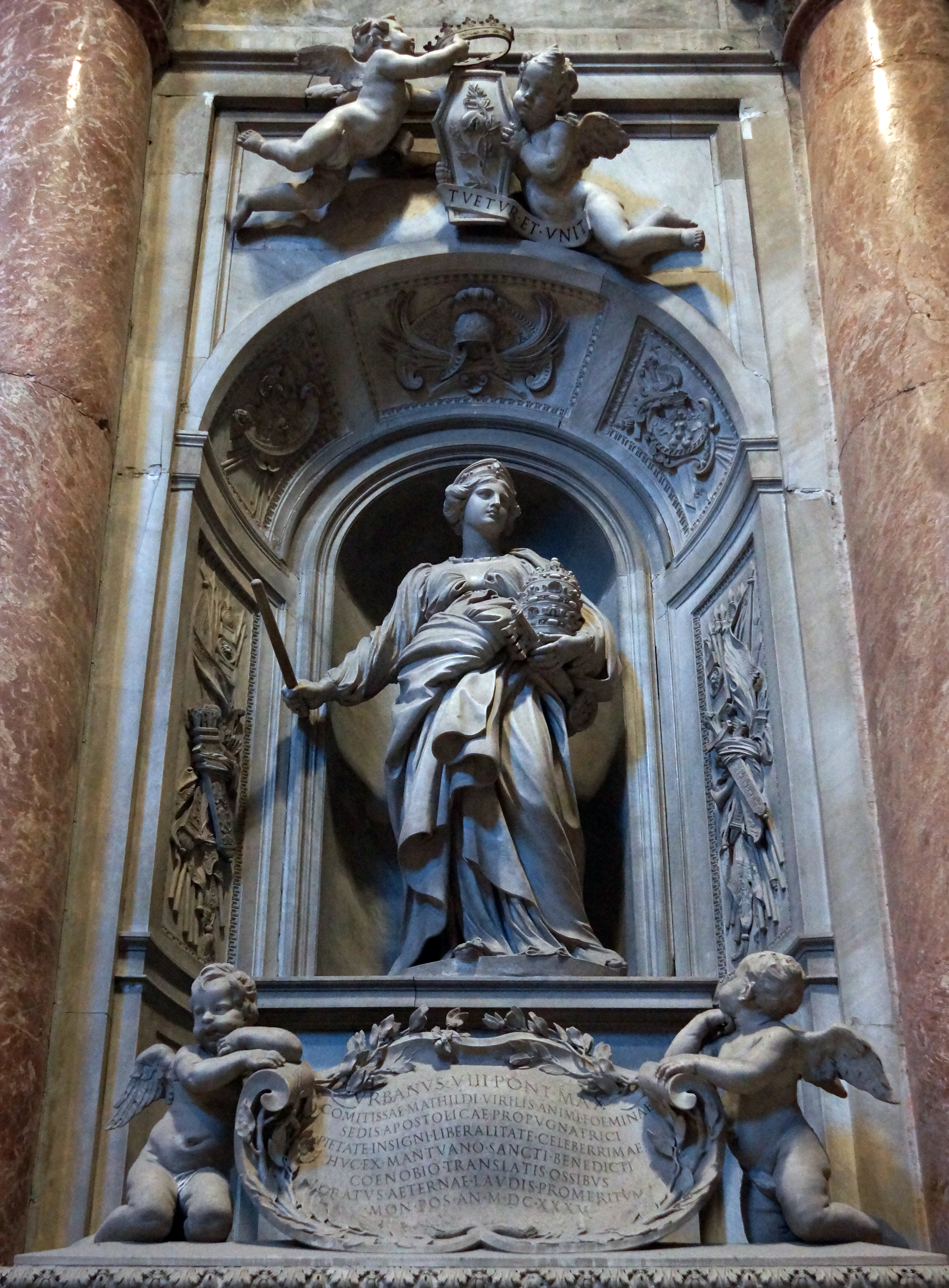
Matilda's tombstone at St. Peter's Basilica, by Bernini

Matilda was at first buried in the Abbey of San Benedetto in Polirone, located in the town of San Benedetto Po; then, in 1633, at the behest of Pope Urban VIII, her body was moved to Rome and placed in Castel Sant'Angelo. Finally, in 1645 her remains were definitively deposited in the Vatican, where they now lie in St. Peter's Basilica. She is one of only six women who have the honor of being buried in the Basilica, the others being Queen Christina of Sweden, Maria Clementina Sobieska (wife of James Francis Edward Stuart), St. Petronilla, Queen Charlotte of Cyprus, and Agnesina Colonna Caetani. A memorial tomb for Matilda, commissioned by Pope Urban VIII and designed by Gianlorenzo Bernini with the statues being created by sculptor Andrea Bolgi, marks her burial place in St. Peter's and is often called the Honor and Glory of Italy.

== Legacy ==
=== High and Late Middle Ages ===
Between 1111 and 1115, Donizo wrote the chronicle De principibus Canusinis in Latin hexameters, in which he tells the story of the House of Canossa, especially Matilda. Since the first edition by Sebastian Tengnagel, it has been called Vita Mathildis. This work is the main source to the Margravine's life. The Vita Mathildis consists of two parts. The first part is dedicated to the early members of the House of Canossa, the second deals exclusively with Matilda. Donizo was a monk in the monastery of Sant'Apollonio; with the Vita Mathildis he wanted to secure eternal memory of the Margravine. Donizo has most likely coordinated his Vita with Matilda in terms of content, including the book illumination, down to the smallest detail. Shortly before the work was handed over, Matilda died. Text and images on the family history of the House of Canossa served to glorify Matilda, were important for the public staging of the family and were intended to guarantee eternal memory. Positive events were highlighted, negative events were skipped. The Vita Mathildis stands at the beginning of a new literary genre. With the early Guelph tradition, it establishes medieval family history. The house and reform monasteries, sponsored by Guelph and Canossa women, attempted to organize the memories of the community of relatives and thereby "to express awareness of the present and an orientation towards the present" in the memory of one's own past. Eugenio Riversi considers the memory of the family epoch, especially the commemoration of the anniversaries of the dead, to be one of the characteristic elements in Donizo's work.

Bonizo of Sutri gave Matilda his Liber ad amicum. In it, he compared her to her glorification with biblical women. After an assassination attempt on him in 1090, however, his attitude changed, as he did not feel sufficiently supported by the Margravine. In his Liber de vita christiana, he took the view that domination by women was harmful; as examples he named Cleopatra and the Merovingian Queen Fredegund. Rangerius of Lucca also distanced himself from Matilda when she did not position herself against Henry V in 1111. Out of bitterness, he did not dedicate his Liber de anulo et baculo to Matilda, but to John of Gaeta, later Pope Gelasius II.

Violent criticism of Matilda is related to the Investiture Controversy and relates to specific events. Thus the Vita Heinrici IV. imperatoris blames her for the rebellion of Conrad against his father Henry IV. The Milanese chronicler Landulfus Senior made a polemical statement in the eleventh century: he accused Matilda of having ordered the murder of her first husband. She is also said to have incited Pope Gregory VII to excommunicate the king. Landulf's polemics were directed against Matilda's Patarian partisans for the archbishop's chair in Milan.

Matilda's tomb was converted into a mausoleum before the middle of the twelfth century. For Paolo Golinelli, this early design of the grave is the beginning of the Margravine's myth. In the course of the twelfth century, two opposing developments occurred: Matilda's person was mystified, but at the same time, historical memory of the House of Canossa declined. In the thirteenth century, Matilda's guilty feelings about the murder of her first husband became a popular topic. The Gesta episcoporum Halberstadensium took it up: Matilda confessed to Pope Gregory VII her participation in the murder of her husband, whereupon the pontiff released her from the crime. Through this act of leniency, Matilda felt obliged to donate her property to the Holy See. In the fourteenth century, there was a lack of clarity about the historical facts about Matilda. Only the name of the Margravine, her reputation as a virtuous woman, her many donations to churches and hospitals, and the transfer of her goods to the Holy See were present. Knowledge of the conflicts between Henry IV and Gregory VII was forgotten. Because of their connection to the Guidi family that gave her little attention in the Florentine chronicles as the Guidi were mortal enemies of Florence. In the Nuova Cronica wrote by Giovanni Villani in 1306, Matilda was a decent and pious person. She is described there as product of a secret marriage between a Byzantine princess with an Italian knight. She also did not consummate the marriage with Welf V; instead, she decided to live her life chaste and with pious works.

=== Early modern times ===
In the fifteenth century, Matilda's marriage to Welf V disappeared from chronicles and narrative literature. Numerous families in Italy tried rather to claim Matilda as their ancestor and to derive their power from her. Giovanni Battista Panetti wanted to prove the Margravine's belonging to the House of Este in his Historia comitissae Mathildis. He claimed that Matilda was married to Albert Azzo II d'Este, the grandfather of Welf V. In his epic Orlando Furioso, poet Ludovico Ariosto also mentioned Matilda's alleged relationship with the House of Este; Giovanni Battista Giraldi also assumed a marriage between Matilda and Albert Azzo II and mentioned Ariosto as reference. Many more generations followed this tradition, and only the Este archivist Ludovico Antonio Muratori was the one able to dismiss the alleged relationship of Matilda and the House of Este in the eighteenth century. Nevertheless, he did not draw a more realistic picture of the Margravine; for him she was an Amazon queen. In Mantua, Matilda was also linked by marriage with the House of Gonzaga. Giulio Dal Pozzo underpinned the claims of the Malaspina family of descent from Matilda in his work Meraviglie Heroiche del Sesso Donnesco Memorabili nella Duchessa Matilda Marchesana Malaspina, Contessa di Canossa, written in 1678.

Dante's Divine Comedy made a significant contribution to Matilda's myth: she has been posited by some critics as the origin of the mysterious "Matelda" who appears to Dante gathering flowers in the earthly paradise in Dante's Purgatorio. Whether Dante is referring to the Margravine, Mechthild of Magdeburg or Mechthild of Hackeborn is still a matter of dispute. In the fifteenth century, Matilda was stylized by Giovanni Sabadino degli Arienti and Jacopo Filippo Foresti as a warrior for God and the Church.

Matilda reached the climax of the positive assessment in the time of the Counter-Reformation and in the Baroque; she should serve as a symbol of the triumph of the church over all adversaries for everyone to see. In the dispute between Catholics and Protestants in the sixteenth century, two opposing judgments were received. From a Catholic perspective, Matilda was glorified for supporting the pope; for the Protestants, she was responsible for the humiliation of Henry IV in Canossa and was denigrated as a "pope whore", as in the biography of Henry IV by Johann Stumpf.

In the historiography of the eighteenth century (Ludovico Antonio Muratori, Girolamo Tiraboschi), Matilda was the symbol of the new Italian nobility, who wanted to create a pan-Italian identity. Contemporary representations (Saverio Dalla Rosa) presented her as the Pope's protector.

In addition to the upscale literature, numerous regional legends and miracle stories in particular contributed to Matilda's subsequent stylization. She was transfigured relatively early from the benefactress of numerous churches and monasteries to the sole monastery and church donor of the entire Apennine landscape. Around 100 churches are attributed to Matilda, this developed from the twelfth century. Numerous miracles are also associated with the Margravine. She is said to have asked the pope to bless the Branciana fountain; according to a legend, women can get pregnant after a single drink from the well. According to another legend, Matilda should prefer to stay at the Savignano Castle; there one should see the princess galloping in the sky on full moon nights on a white horse. According to a legend from Montebaranzone, she brought justice to a poor widow and her twelve-year-old son. Numerous legends also surround about Matilda's marriages: she is said to have had up to seven husbands and, as a young girl, fell in love with Henry IV.

=== Modern times ===
In the nineteenth century, which was enthusiastic about the Middle Ages, the Margravine's myth was renewed. The remains of Canossa Castle were rediscovered and Matilda's whereabouts became popular travel destinations. In addition, Dante's praise for Matelda came back into the spotlight. One of the first German pilgrims to Canossa was the poet August von Platen-Hallermünde. In 1839, Heinrich Heine published the poem Auf dem Schloßhof zu Canossa steht der deutsche Kaiser Heinrich ("The German Emperor Henry stands in the courtyard of Canossa"), in which it says: "Peep out of the window above / Two figures, and the moonlight / Gregory's bald head flickers / And the breasts of Mathildis".

In the era of the Risorgimento, the struggle for national unification was in the foreground in Italy. Matilda was instrumentalized for daily political events. Silvio Pellico stood up for the political unity of Italy, and he designed a play called Mathilde. Antonio Bresciani Borsa wrote a historical novel La contessa Matilde di Canossa e Isabella di Groniga (1858). The work was very successful in its time and saw Italian editions in 1858, 1867, 1876, and 1891. French (1850 and 1862), German (1868), and English (1875) translations were also published.

The Matilda's myth lives on in Italy to the present day. The Matildines were a Catholic women's association founded in Reggio Emilia in 1918, similar to the Azzione Cattolica. The organization wanted to bring together young people from the province who wanted to work with the church hierarchy to spread the Christian faith. The Matildines revered the Margravine as a pious, strong, and steadfast daughter of St. Peter. After the World War II, numerous biographies and novels were written in Italy on Matilda and Canossa. Maria Bellonci published the story Trafitto a Canossa ("Tormented in Canossa"), Laura Mancinelli the novel Il principe scalzo. Local historical publications honor her as the founder of churches and castles in the regions of Reggio Emilia, Mantua, Modena, Parma, Lucca and Casentino.

Quattro Castella is named after the four Canusinian castles on the four hills at the foot of the Apennines. Bianello is the only castle that is still in use. A large number of communities on the northern and southern Apennines traces their origins and their heyday back to Matilda's epoch. Numerous citizen initiatives in Italy organize removals under the motto "Matilda and her time". Emilian circles applied for Matilda's beatification in 1988 without success. The place Quattro Castella had its name changed to Canossa out of reverence for Matilda. Since 1955 the Corteo Storico Matildico in Bianello Castle has been a reminiscent display of Matilda's meeting with Henry V and reported coronation as vicar and vice-queen; the event has taken place every year since then, usually on the last Sunday of May. The organizer is the municipality of Quattro Castella, which has owned the castle since 2000. The ruins on the hills of Quattro Castella have been the subject of a petition for UNESCO World Heritage.

=== Research history ===
Matilda receives much attention in Italian history. Matildine Congresses were held in 1963, 1970, and 1977. On the occasion of the 900th anniversary of the Walk of Canossa, the Istituto Superiore di Studi Matildici was founded in Italy in 1977 and inaugurated in May 1979. The institute is dedicated to the research of all notable citizens of Canossa and publishes a magazine entitled Annali Canossani.

In Italy, Ovidio Capitani was one of the best experts on Canossa history in the twentieth century. According to his judgment in 1978, Matilda's policy was "tutto legato al passato", completely tied to the past, i.e. outdated and inflexible in the face of a changing time. Vito Fumagalli presented several national historical studies on the Margraves of Canossa; he saw the causes of the Canossa's power in rich and centralized allodial goods, in a strategic network of fortifications, and in the support of the Salian rulers. In 1998, a year after his death, Fumagalli's biography of Matilda was published.

Of the Italian medievalists, Paolo Golinelli has dealt most intensively with Matilda in the past three decades. In 1991 he published a biography of Matilda, which appeared in 1998 in a German translation. On the occasion of the 900th return of Matilda's meeting with her allies in Carpineti, a financially supported congress was held in October 1992 by the province of Reggio Emilia. The rule of the House of Canossa and the various problems of rule in northern Italy of the tenth and eleventh centuries were dealt with. The contributions to this conference were edited by Paolo Golinelli. An international congress in Reggio Emilia in September 1997 was devoted to her afterlife in cultural and literary terms. The aim of the conference was to find out why Matilda attracted such interest in posterity. Thematically, arts and crafts, tourism, and folklore have been dealt with until recently. Most of the contributions were devoted to the genealogical attempts of the northern Italian nobility to link Matilda in the early modern period. Golinelli published the anthology in 1999. As an important result of this conference it turned out that goods and family relationships have been ascribed to her that have not been historically proven.

In German history, Alfred Overmann's dissertation formed the starting point for studying the history of the margravine. Since 1893 Overmann placed his investigation about Matilda in several Regest publications. The work was reprinted in 1965 and published in 1980 in an Italian translation. In the last few decades Werner and Elke Goez in particular have dealt with Matilda. From 1986 the couple worked together on the scientific edition of their documents. More than 90 archives and libraries in six countries were visited. The edition was created in 1998 in the series Diplomata, which the Monumenta Germaniae Historica published. In addition to numerous individual studies on Matilda, Elke Goez published a biography of Matilda's mother Beatrice (1995) and emerged as the author of a history of Italy in the Middle Ages (2010). In 2012 she presented a biography of Matilda.

The 900th year of Henry IV's death in 2006 brought Matilda into the spotlight in the exhibitions in Paderborn (2006) and Mantua (2008). The 900th anniversary of her death in 2015 was the occasion for various initiatives in Italy and sessions at the International Medieval Congress at Leeds. The 21st Congresso Internazionale di Studi Longobardi took place in October of the same year. This resulted in two conference volumes. In Williamsburg, Virginia from February to April 2015, an exhibition took place at the Muscarelle Museum of Art, the first in the United States on Matilda.

== See also ==
- House of Canossa
- March of Tuscany
- Terre Matildiche

== Sources ==
- Althoff, Gerd (2006). Heinrich IV (in German). Darmstadt.
- Beeler, John (1971). Warfare in Feudal Europe, 730–1200. Cornell University Press. ISBN 978-0801491207.
- Capitani, Ovidio, ed. (1999). La Matelda di Dante e Matilde di Canossa: un problema aperto. Discorso di apertura (in Italian). Bologna: Matilde di Canossa nelle culture europee del secondo millennio. Dalla storia al mito. Atti del convegno internazionale di studi (Reggio Emilia, Canossa, Quattro Castella, 25 – 27 settembre 1997).
- Fried, Johannes (2001). Klaus Herbers (ed.). ..."auf Bitten der Gräfin Mathilde": Werner von Bologna und Irnerius. Mit einem Exkurs von Gundula Grebner (in German). Stuttgart: Europa an der Wende vom 11. zum 12. Jahrhundert: Beiträge zu Ehren von Werner Goez. pp. 171–206.
- Ghirardini, Lino Lionello (1989). Storia critica di Matilde di Canossa, Problemi (e misteri) della più grande donna della storia d'Italia (in Italian). Modena: Aedes Muratoriana.
- Goez, Elke (1995). "Beatrix von Canossa und Tuszien. Eine Untersuchung zur Geschichte des 11. Jahrhunderts". Vorträge und Forschungen: Sonderbände (in German). 41. Sigmaringen. doi:10.11588/vuf-sb.1995.0.16977.
- Goez, Elke (1996). Der Thronerbe als Rivale. König Konrad, Kaiser Heinrichs IV. älterer Sohn (in German). Historisches Jahrbuch 116. pp. 1–49.
- Goez, Elke (2004). Dieter R. Bauer, Matthias Becher (ed.). Welf V. und Mathilde von Canossa (in German). Munich: Welf IV. Schlüsselfigur einer Wendezeit. Regionale und europäische Perspektiven. pp. 360–381.
- Goez, Elke (2006a). Christoph Stiegemann, Matthias Wemhoff (ed.). Die Canusiner – Machtpolitik einer oberitalienischen Adelsfamilie (in German). Munich: Canossa 1077. Erschütterung der Welt. pp. 117–128.
- Goez, Elke (2006b). Jörg Jarnut, Matthias Wemhoff (ed.). Mathilde von Canossa – Herrschaft zwischen Tradition und Neubeginn (in German). Munich: Vom Umbruch zur Erneuerung? Das 11. und beginnende 12. Jahrhundert – Positionen der Forschung. pp. 321–339.
- Goez, Elke (2007). Bernd Schneidmüller, Stefan Weinfurter (ed.). Ein neuer Typ der europäischen Fürstin im 11. und frühen 12. Jahrhundert? (in German). Darmstadt: Salisches Kaisertum und neues Europa. Die Zeit Heinrichs IV. und Heinrichs V. pp. 161–193.
- Goez, Elke (2010). Geschichte Italiens im Mittelalter (in German). Darmstadt: WBG Wissenschaftliche Buchgesellschaft. ISBN 978-3534211494.
- Goez, Elke (2012). Mathilde von Canossa (in German). Darmstadt: Primus-Verlag. ISBN 978-3863123468.
- Goez, Elke (2015). Claudia Zey (ed.). "Mit den Mitteln einer Frau? Zur Bedeutung der Fürstinnen in der späten Salierzeit". Vorträge und Forschungen (in German). 81. Ostfildern: Mächtige Frauen? Königinnen und Fürstinnen im europäischen Mittelalter (11. – 14. Jahrhundert).: 307–336. doi:10.11588/vuf.2015.0.46255.
- Goez, Werner (1997). Über die Mathildischen Schenkungen an die Römische Kirche (in German). Frühmittelalterliche Studien 31. pp. 158–196.
- Golinelli, Paolo, ed. (1994). I poteri dei Canossa da Reggio all'Europa. Atti del convegno internazionale di studi, Reggio Emilia, 29.–31.10.1992 (in Italian). Bologna. pp. 455–471. ISBN 8855523015.
- Golinelli, Paolo (1998). Mathilde und der Gang nach Canossa, im Herzen des Mittelalters (in German). Düsseldorf/Zürich: Artemis & Winkler. ISBN 978-3538070653.
- Golinelli, Paolo (2001). Werner Goez, Klaus Herbers (ed.). Die Lage Italiens nach dem Investiturstreit: Die Frage der mathildischen Erbschaft (in German). Stuttgart: Europa an der Wende vom 11. zum 12. Jahrhundert. Beiträge zu Ehren von Werner Goez. pp. 54–67.
- Golinelli, Paolo (2006). Christoph Stiegemann, Matthias Wemhoff (ed.). Die Rezeption des Canossa-Ereignisses und das Bild der Markgräfin Mathilde in Italien (in German). Munich: Canossa 1077. Erschütterung der Welt. pp. 592–602.
- Golinelli, Paolo (2015a). Lukas Clemens; Katrin Dort; Felix Schumacher (eds.). Canossa terra dei rifugio. Carità e ospitalità della contessa Matilde (in Italian). Trier: Laienadel und Armenfürsorge im Mittelalter. pp. 61–73.
- Golinelli, Paolo (2015b). Michèle K. Spike (ed.). The Afterlife of Matilda of Canossa (1115–2015) (in Italian). Williamsburg: Matilda of Canossa & the origins of the Renaissance. An exhibition in honor of the 900th anniversary of her death. pp. 31–35.
- Golinelli, Paolo (2016). Matilde: La donna e il potere. Matilde di Canossa e il suo tempo: Atti del XXI Congresso internazionale di studio sull'alto medioevo in occasione del IX centenario della morte (1115–2015). San Benedetto Po – Revere – Mantova – Quattro Castella, 20–24 ottobre 2015 (PDF) (in Italian). Spoleto: Fondazione Centro Italiano di Studi sull'Alto Medioevo. pp. 1–34. Archived from the original (PDF) on 2018-08-28.
- Eads, Valerie (2010). "The Last Italian Expedition of Henry IV: Re-reading the Vita Mathildis of Donizone of Canossa". Journal of Medieval Military History. 8: 23–68. doi:10.1515/9781846159022-002.
- Ferrante, Joan M. (1997). To the Glory of Her Sex: Women's Roles in the Composition of Medieval Texts. Indiana University Press. ISBN 978-0253211088.
- Hay, David (2008). The military leadership of Matilda of Canossa, 1046-1115. Manchester University Press.
- Healey, Patrick (2013). The Chronicle of Hugh of Flavigny: Reform and the Investiture Contest in the Late Eleventh Century. Ashgate Publishing, Ltd. ISBN 978-1409479574.
- Laudage, Johannes (2004). "Macht und Ohnmacht Mathildes von Tuszien" [Power and Powerlessness of Matilda of Tuscany]. In Finger, Heinz (ed.). Die Macht der Frauen [The Power of Women] (in German). Düsseldorf. pp. 97–143.
- Overmann, Alfred (1895). Gräfin Mathilde von Tuscien. Ihre Besitzungen. Geschichte ihres Gutes von 1115–1230 und ihre Regesten (in German). Innsbruck: Verlag der Wagner'schen universitäts-buchhandlung.
- Peters, Edward, ed. (1971). The First Crusade. Philadelphia: University of Pennsylvania Press. ISBN 978-0812210170.
- Piva, Paolo (2006). Christoph Stiegemann, Matthias Wemhoff (ed.). Die Canusiner und "ihre" Kirchenbauten. Von Adalbert Atto bis Mathilde (in German). Munich: Canossa 1077. Erschütterung der Welt. pp. 129–142.
- Riley-Smith, Jonathan; Luscombe, David, eds. (2004). The New Cambridge Medieval History: Volume 4, C.1024-c.1198. Cambridge University Press. pp. 78, 84–85. ISBN 978-0521414111.
- Robinson, I.S. (2003). Henry IV of Germany, 1056-1106. Cambridge.
- Robinson, Ian (2004). The Papal Reform of the Eleventh Century: Lives of Pope Leo IX and Pope Gregory VII. Manchester University Press. ISBN 978-0719038754.
- Spike, Michele (2004). Tuscan Countess: The Life and Extraordinary Times of Matilda of Canossa. Vendome Press. ISBN 978-0865652422.
- Spike, Michele (2014). "Scritto nella pietra: Le 'Cento Chiese,' Programma gregoriano di Matilda di Canossa" in Atti del Convegno Internazionale "San Cesario sul Panaro da Matilde di Canossa all'Eta' (in Italian). Modena: Paolo Golinelli and Pierpaolo Bonacini, eds. — San Cesario sul Panaro da Matilde di Canossa all'Età Moderna: atti del convegno internazionale, 9 – 10 novembre 2012. pp. 11–42.
- Spike, Michele (2015a). An Illustrated Guide to the 'One Hundred Churches of Matilda of Canossa, Countess of Tuscany. Centro Di, Florence. ISBN 978-8870385342.
- Spike, Michele (2015b). Matilda of Canossa and the Origins of the Renaissance. The Muscarelle Museum of Art, The College of William & Mary. ISBN 978-0988529373.
- Spike, Michele (2016). Matilda di Canossa (1046-1115): la donna che mutò il corso della storia / Matilda of Canossa (1046-1115): the women who changed the course of history, exhibition catalogue in Italian & English, Casa Buonarroti, Florence, June 14 – October 10, 2016. Centro Di, Florence.
- Struve, Tilman (1995). Mathilde von Tuszien-Canossa und Heinrich IV. Der Wandel ihrer Beziehungen vor dem Hintergrund des Investiturstreites (PDF) (in German). Historisches Jahrbuch 115. pp. 41–84.
- Villalon, L. J. Andrew (2003). Crusaders, Condottieri, and Cannon: Medieval Warfare in Societies Around the Mediterranean. BRILL. ISBN 978-9004125537.

Italian nobility
| Preceded by Frederick | Margravine of Tuscany; 1055–1115 | Vacant Title next held by Rabodo |
