= Tempietto del Petrarca, Canossa =

Coordinates: 44°33′56″N 10°24′19″E

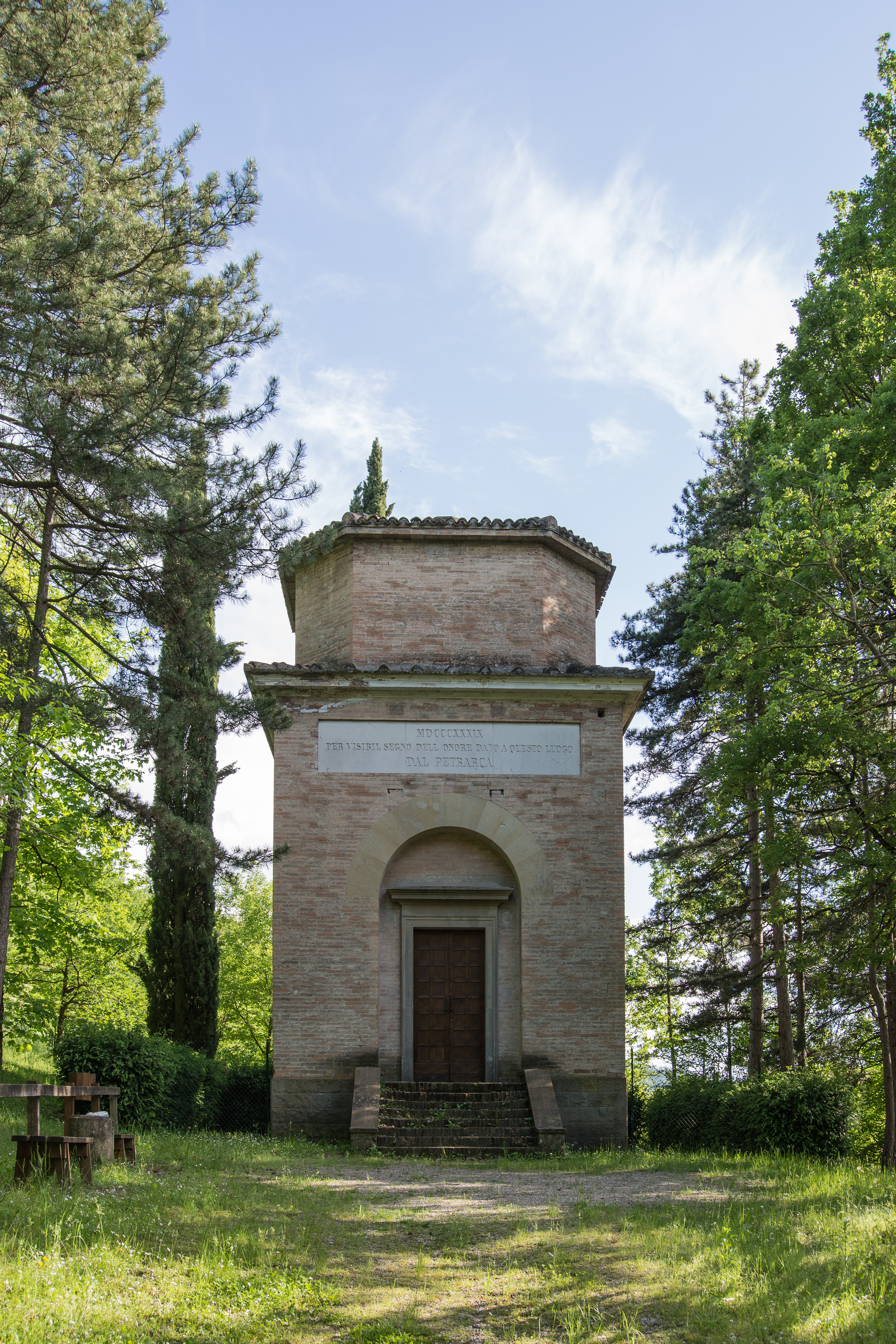
Tempietto del Petrarca

Tempietto del Petrarca is commemorative structure near the river Enza in Selvapiana, that is an hamlet in the municipality of Canossa in the Province of Reggio Emilia, Italy. The structure was built to recalls the stay here by Petrarch during 1343, when he was hosted by the condottiero Azzo da Correggio.

Construction of the charming tempietto (small temple or chapel, although secular) was begun in 1839 during the flourishing of Romanticism's attachment to classical literature, and completed in a few years. It houses a marble statue of Petrach by Tommaso Bandini, and ceiling frescoes by Francesco Scaramuzza.
