= Terre Matildiche =

Area ruled by Matilda of Tuscany

The March of Tuscany (Orange) in 1084

The term "Terre Matildiche" or "Terre di Canossa" is used to refer to the group of territories that was ruled by the countess Matilda of Tuscany.

== Territories ==
- Canossa (cultural capital)
- Province of Reggio Emilia
- Province of Parma
- Province of Modena
- Province of Ferrara
- Tuscany (but not the Tuscan Archipelago)
- parts of Lombardy (Lake Iseo and Adda)
- west Umbria
- Maremma laziale
