= Abbey of Frassinoro =

Defunct abbey in Frassinoro, Italy

Coordinates: 44°17′38.06″N 10°34′18.95″E

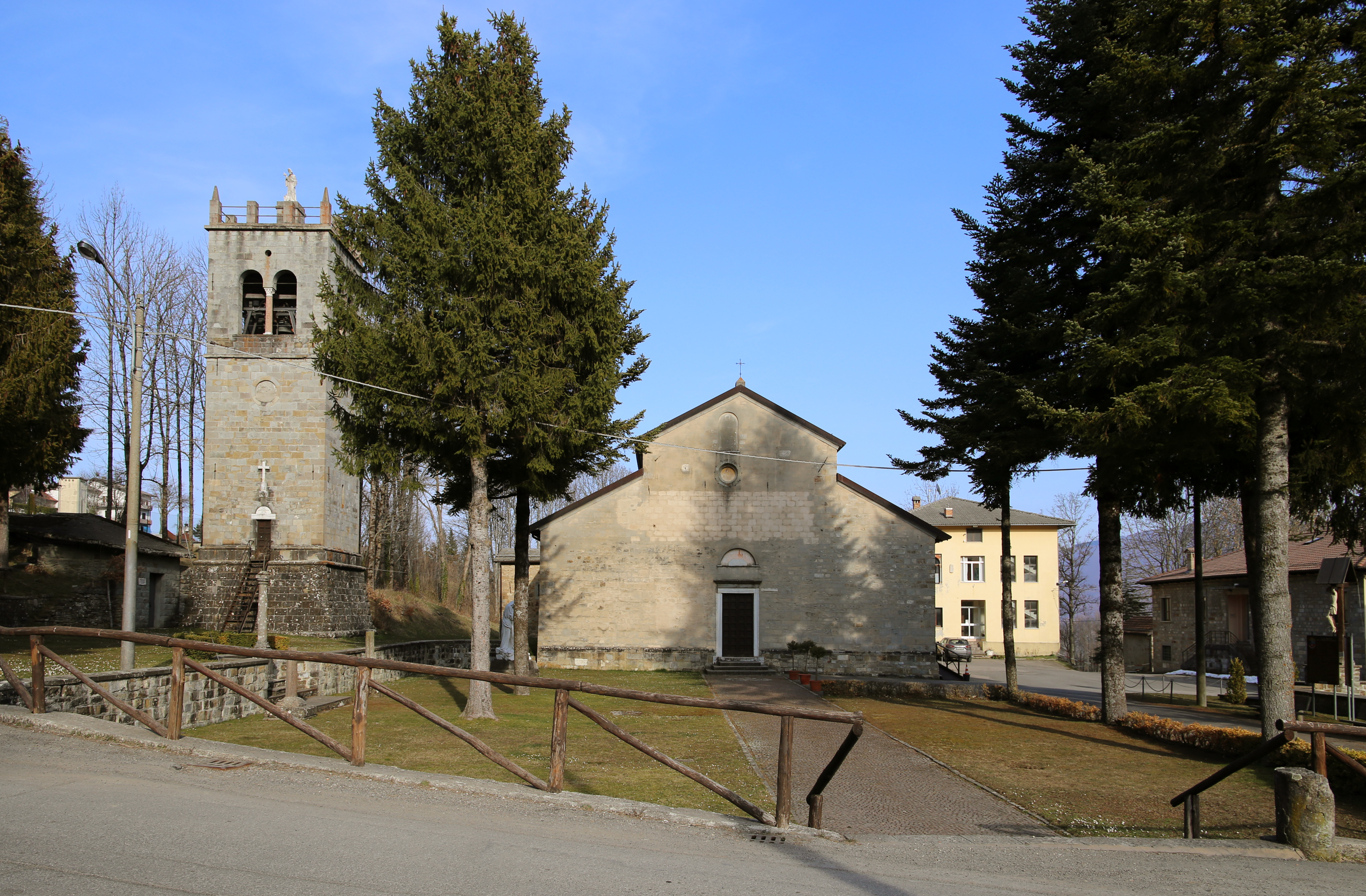
Frassinoro Abbey

The Abbey of Frassinoro was one of the many Benedictine monasteries throughout Europe associated with the noblewoman Matilda of Tuscany, who reigned over the Badia lands near Frassinoro. This abbey was located in Frassinoro, in the Apennines in the province of Modena, on the border with Reggio Emilia.

== History ==
It is believed that the original church dates back to the Italian-Byzantine period in the 7th-10th centuries. At the end of the 8th century, there was a small church under the administration of the pieve (parish) of Rubbiano; the former had been in existence since the time of Siegfried I, Longobard founder of the Canossa dynasty, or about 930 AD. The chapel was located along the ancient via Bibulca which went through the San Pellegrino Pass in order to arrive to Lucca, a destination for pilgrims who came to worship the "Holy Face". Between 1007 and 1052, a hostel for travelers was annexed to the church, and was then placed under the Abbey of Polirone, near Mantua. In 1072, Beatrice of Lotharinga or Beatrice of Bar and her daughter Matilda of Canossa (also called Matilda of Tuscany), gave the relics of Saint Claudius, a martyr, to this Benedictine convent. The highest period of splendor for this abbey was when Beatrice of Lotharingia founded a Benedictine abbey; thereafter, its history got confused with that of the abbey in the nearby town of Montefiorino. From 1210 to 1261, the abbey was at the center of several disputes with the municipality of Modena for control of the territory.

== The site today ==
All that remains of the abbey are a few liturgical objects from the 11th and 12th centuries, some of which are kept in the Civic Museum of Modena. Built on the old foundations of the abbey, which fell into ruin in the 15th century, stands the present church of Frassinoro dedicated to Santa Maria Assunta of San Claudio and Lawrence

== See also ==
- Frassinoro
- Montefiorino
