= San Benedetto Po =

San Benedetto Po San Banadèt (Emilian)
- Comune
- Comune di San Benedetto Po
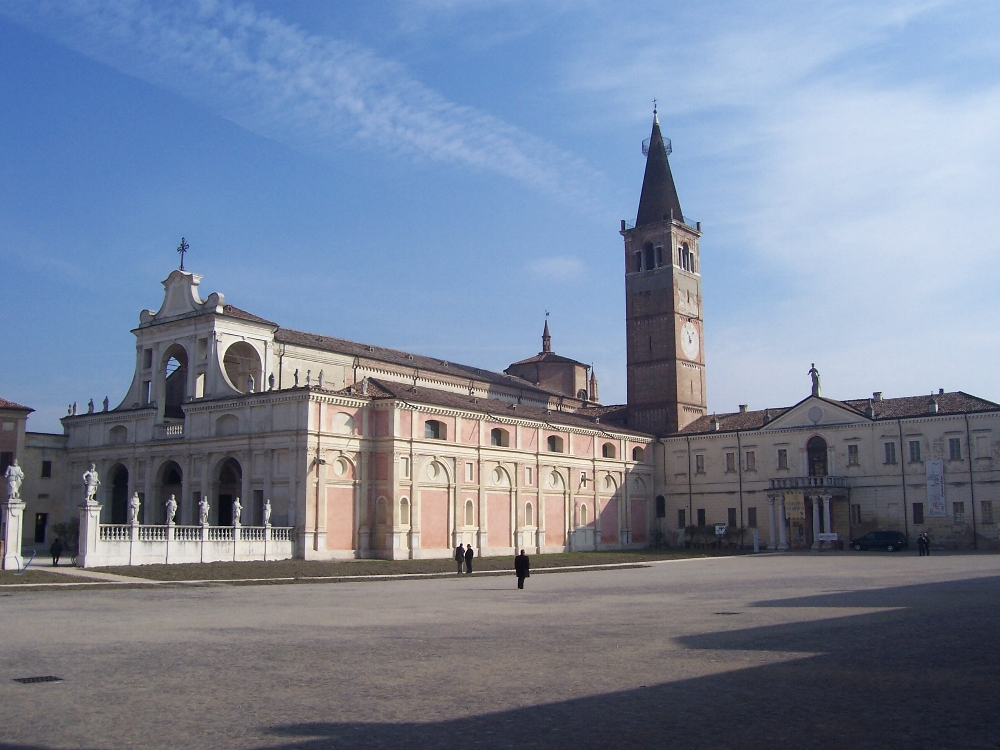

- Coat of arms

- Location within Italy Location within Lombardy
- Coordinates: 45°2′N 10°55′E
- Country: Italy
- Region: Lombardy
- Province: Mantua (MN)
- Frazioni: Bardelle Camatta, Brede, Mirasole, Portiolo, San Siro, Zovo

Government
  - Mayor: Roberto Lasagna

Area
  - Total: 69.6 km^{2} (26.9 sq mi)
- Elevation: 19 m (62 ft)

Population (31 December 2021)
  - Total: 6,716
  - Density: 96.5/km^{2} (250/sq mi)
- Demonym: Sambenedettini
- Time zone: UTC+1 (CET)
  - Summer (DST): UTC+2 (CEST)
- Postal code: 46027
- Dialing code: 0376
- Patron saint: St. Benedict
- Website: Official website

San Benedetto Po (Lower Mantovano: San Banadèt) is a comune (municipality) in the Province of Mantua in the Italian region Lombardy, located about 150 kilometres (93 mi) southeast of Milan and about 15 kilometres (9 mi) southeast of Mantua. It is one of I Borghi più belli d'Italia ("The most beautiful villages of Italy"). It is best known as the location of the Polirone Abbey.
