= Canossa =

- Comune
- Comune di Canossa
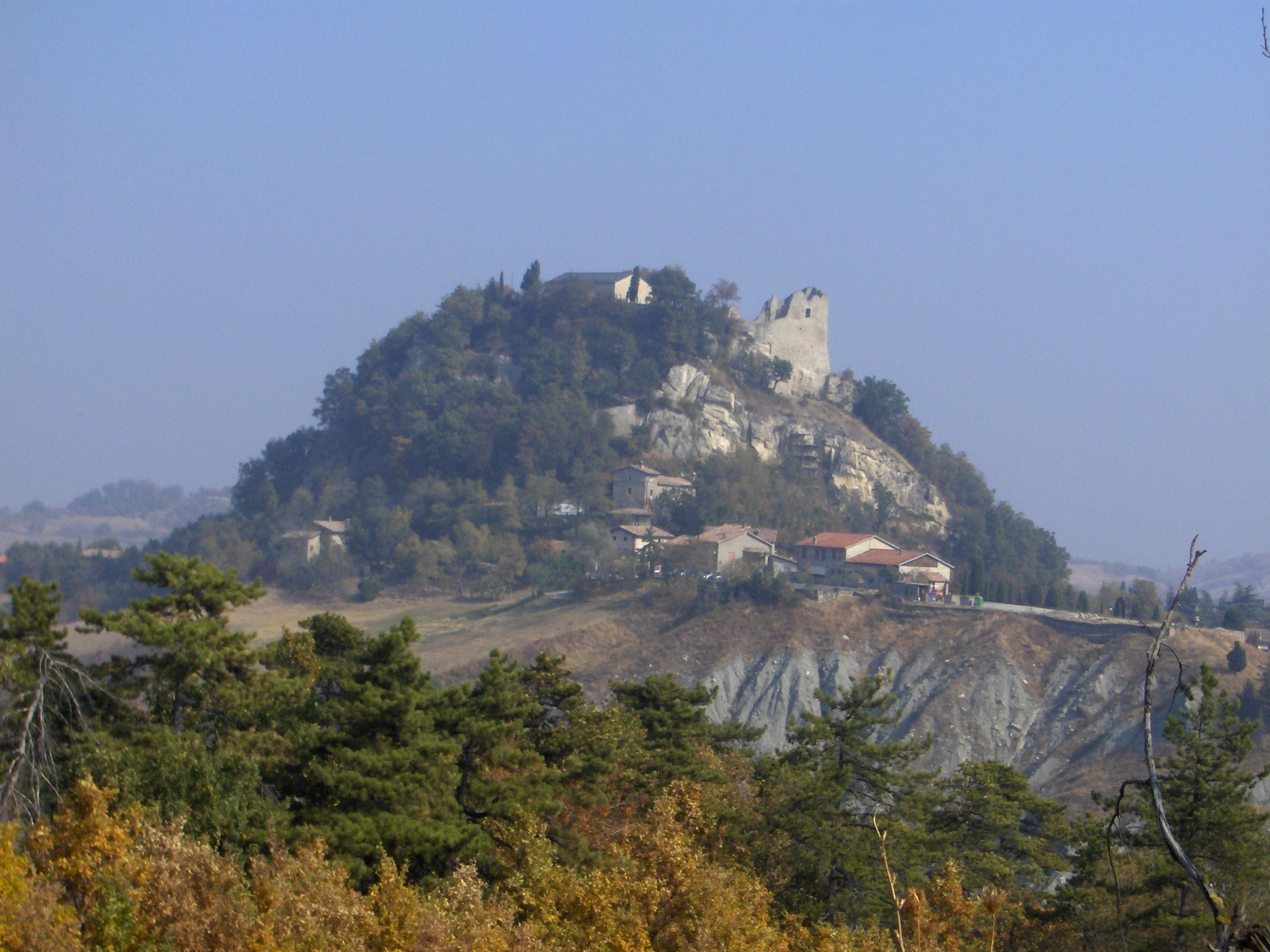
- View of the Rock of Canossa with the ruins of the castle visible at the top

- Coat of arms

- Location within Italy Location within Emilia-Romagna
- Coordinates: 44°36′N 10°25′E
- Country: Italy
- Region: Emilia-Romagna
- Province: Reggio Emilia (RE)
- Frazioni: Albareto, Borzano Chiesa, Borzano di Sopra, Borzano di Sotto, Braglie, Casalino, Cavandola, Ceredolo de' Coppi, Ceredolo dei Coppi Nuovo, Cerezzola, Ciano d'Enza, Compiano, Crognolo, Currada, Dirotte, Fornace, Gazzolo, Iagarone, Massalica, Monchio delle Olle, Pietranera, Roncaglio, Roncovetro, Rossena, Selva, Selvapiana, Solara, Trinità, Vedriano, Verlano, Votigno

Government
  - Mayor: Luca Bolondi

Area
  - Total: 53 km^{2} (20 sq mi)
- Highest elevation: 689 m (2,260 ft)
- Lowest elevation: 112 m (367 ft)

Population (31 December 2016)
  - Total: 3,778
  - Density: 71/km^{2} (180/sq mi)
- Demonym: Canossani
- Time zone: UTC+1 (CET)
  - Summer (DST): UTC+2 (CEST)
- Postal code: 42263
- Dialing code: 0522
- Website: Official website

Canossa (Reggiano: Canòsa) is a comune and castle town in the Province of Reggio Emilia, Emilia-Romagna, northern Italy. It is where Holy Roman Emperor Henry IV did penance in 1077 and stood three days bare-headed in the snow to reverse his excommunication by Pope Gregory VII. The Walk to Canossa is sometimes used as a symbol of the changing relationship between the medieval Church and State.

As of December 2014, Canossa has a population of 3,778, and borders the comuni of Casina, Castelnovo ne' Monti, Neviano degli Arduini (PR), San Polo d'Enza, Traversetolo (PR), Vetto, and Vezzano sul Crostolo.

The town was formerly known as Ciano d'Enza, while Canossa was the name of only the castle, now in ruins, once belonging to Matilda of Tuscany, and nearby hamlet, which lie some 8 km east of the town. The new name was decided in 1992.

== Main sights ==
Matilda with Hugo of Cluny and Holy Roman Emperor Henry IV.

Canossa Castle was built before the middle of the 10th century by Adalbert Atto, son of Sigifred of Lucca.

Adelaide of Italy, in the 10th century the daughter, daughter-in-law, and widow in turn of three kings, was hard pressed by a local nobleman, Berengar of Ivrea, who declared himself king of Italy, abducted Adelaide, and tried to legitimize his reign by forcing Adelaide to marry his son Adalbert; but she escaped to Canossa. From the rocca of Canossa she called for German intervention. Canossa was inherited by Matilda of Tuscany, the principal Italian supporter of Pope Gregory VII, in 1052.

Matilda invited Pope Gregory VII to take refuge in Canossa Castle in 1076/77 during the dispute with Henry IV, the Holy Roman Emperor. In the end their joint fears proved groundless when Henry appeared in the guise of a penitent and begged for forgiveness and reinstatement in the church. After three days of waiting at the castle gates, Henry was admitted and forgiven. Matilda died in 1115 in Mantuan territory.

The fortress was destroyed by invaders from Reggio Emilia in 1256. The church of San Apollonio, within the castle walls and contemporary with the castle, was also destroyed. Only the christening font remains, preserved in the Naborre Campanini national museum next to the remains of the wall.

Perched on top of the white cliffs of the Apennines, the castle is a ruin today. More than 30,000 tourists come here each year, especially from Germany.

The nearby Tempietto del Petrarca, Canossa celebrates the refuge of Petrarch offered here by a local warlord.

== Other ==
Saint Magdalene of Canossa is an Italian saint of the early 19th century, who founded the Institute of the Daughters of Charity and in whose name Canossian schools have been established in many countries. She is known for her strong and deep faith in God.

== See also ==
- Walk to Canossa
- Matilda of Tuscany
- Terre Matildiche
