= Madonna and Child (Champaigne) =

Painting by Philippe de Champaigne

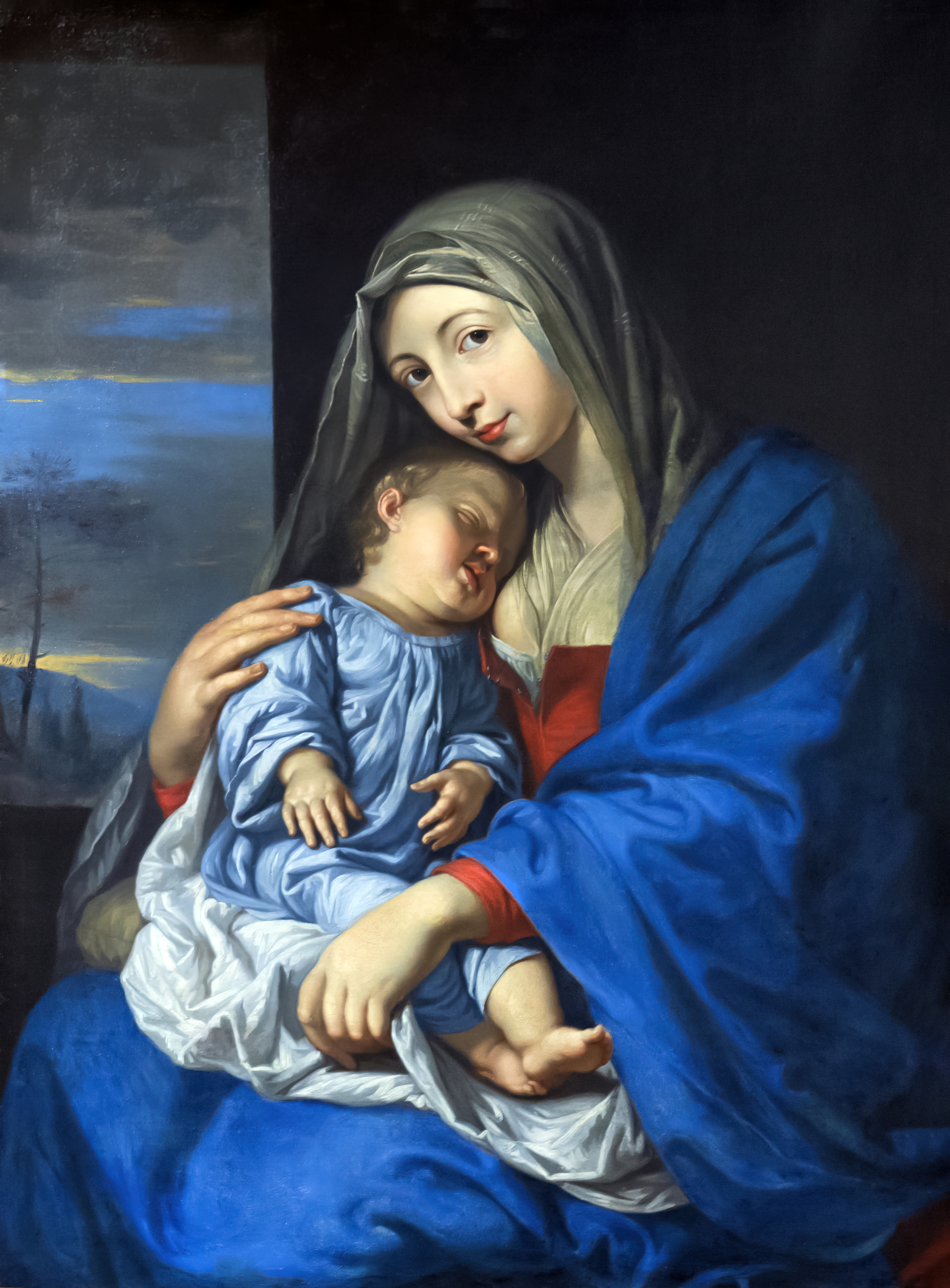
Madonna and Child (c. 1654-1655)

Madonna and Child or Madonna with the Sleeping Christ Child is a c.1654-1655 oil on canvas work by Philippe de Champaigne, now in the Musée des Beaux-Arts d'Agen in Agen.
