= Pierre Ernou =

French painter

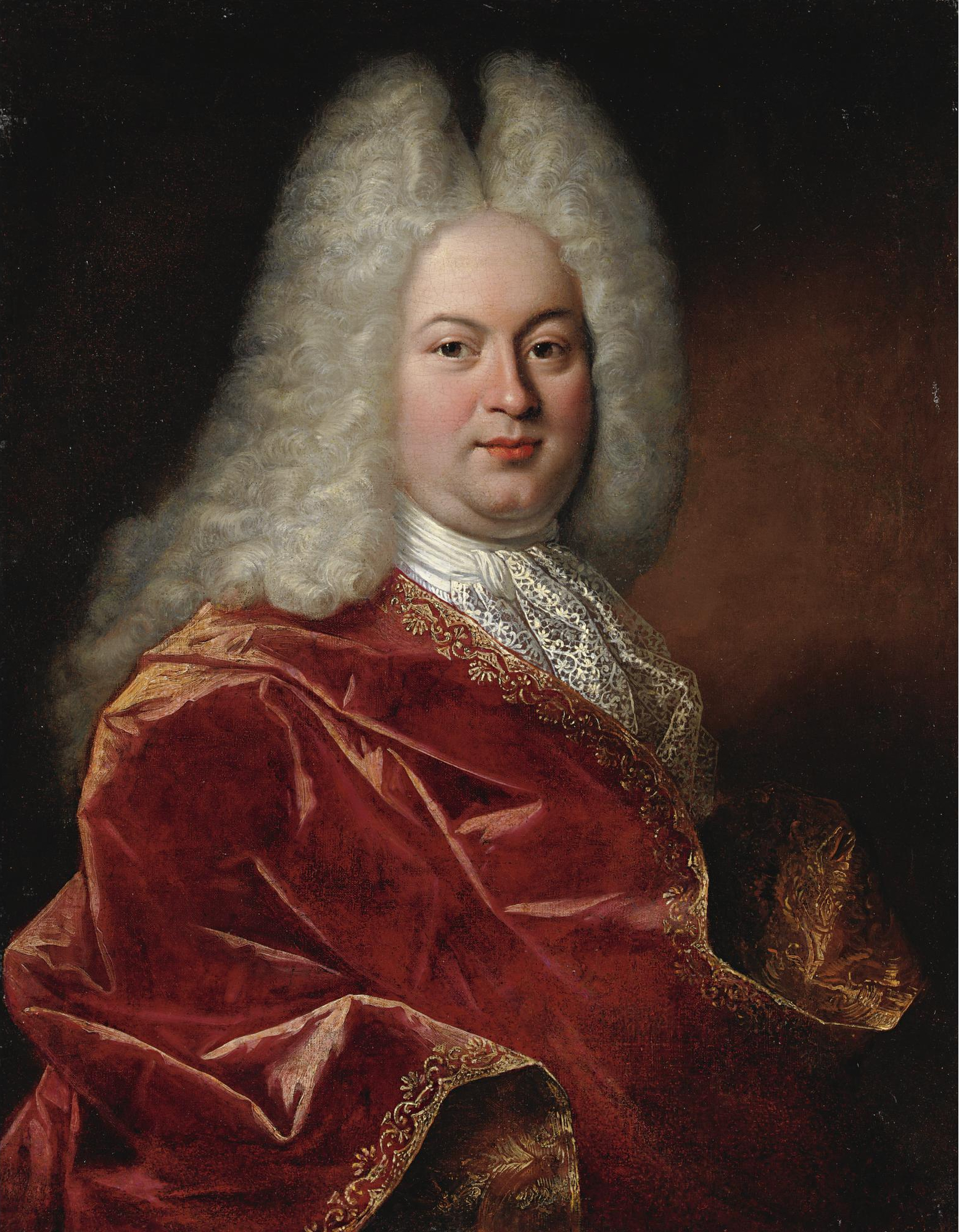
Portrait of an Unknown Man, 1713

Pierre Ernou (1685–1739), known as "le chevalier Ernou", was a French painter. He was born in Angers. Little is known of his life, save that he was the son of the painter Jean Ernou, and that he passed much of his career in the French provinces. He is known, however, to have been in Paris and in Lyon at points during his career.

Pierre worked primarily in Angers, where he painted numerous portraits of aldermen. His presence in Lyon is documented in 1730. On the back of most of his works, Pierre Ernou signed with the title of "Chevalier ", a distinction awarded by the Portuguese Order of Christ.

Annick Nottet, curator of the Musée des Beaux-Arts d'Orléans, said that Ernou's works "betray a painter lacking true genius, more concerned with physical resemblance and outward appearance than with the sitter's psychological intensity and inner life." However, she goes on to assert that "the artist successfully—and quite felicitously—assimilated the dual lessons of Rigaud, regarding the rigor, solidity, and effectiveness of a composition that dramatizes the fabrics, and of Largillière, regarding the elegance and shimmering quality of the colors."

== Works ==
- Portrait of a man. Orléans, musée des Beaux-arts. Inv. 411. Dated and signed on the back prior to relining: "painted by the Chevalier Ernou, 1704".
- Portrait of a man. Orléans, musée des Beaux-arts. Inv. 1526.
- Portrait of Pierre Simon, engraver. Engraved in 1694 by Gérard Edelinck.
- Portrait of a Gentleman, Joseph-Déchelette Museum of Fine Arts and Archaeology, Roanne
