= Isbrand van Diemerbroeck =

Dutch physician, anatomist, and professor

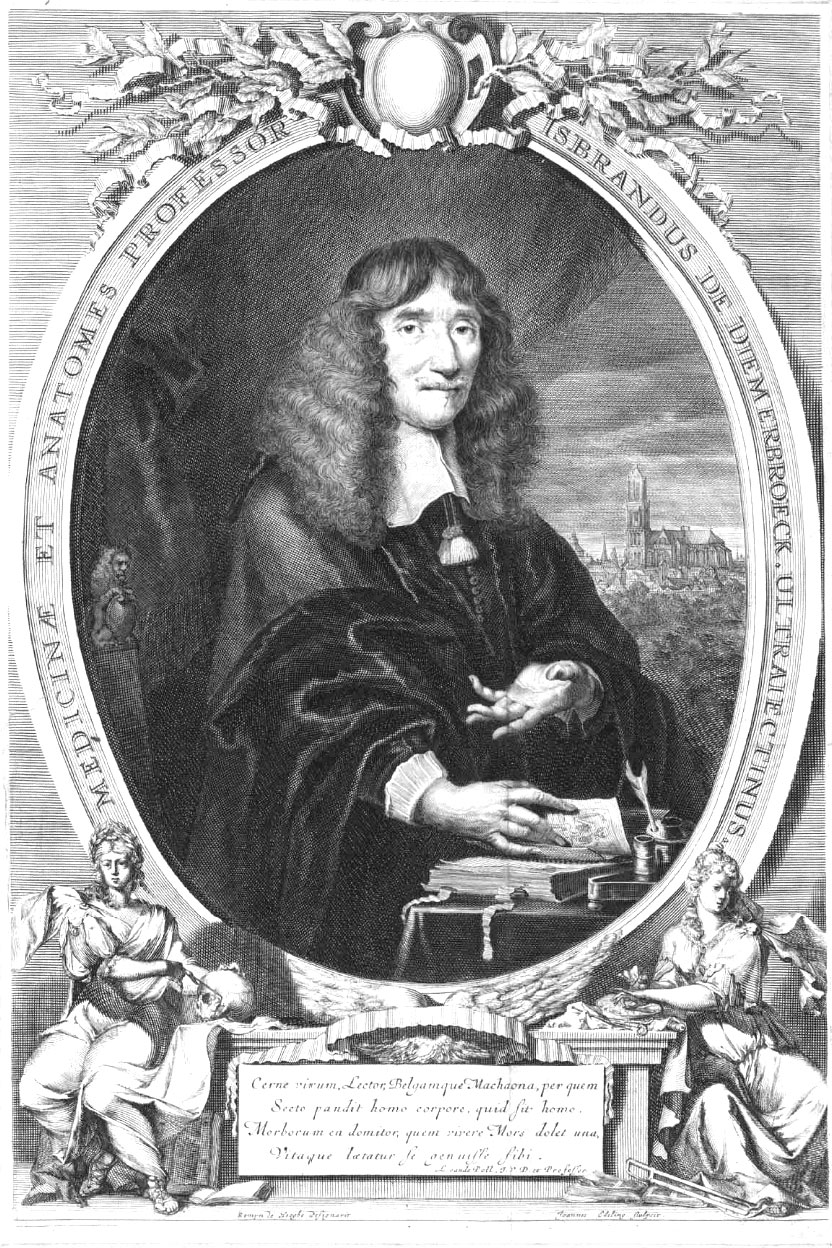
Isbrand van Diemerbroeck, ca. 1670, engraving by Jean Edelinck

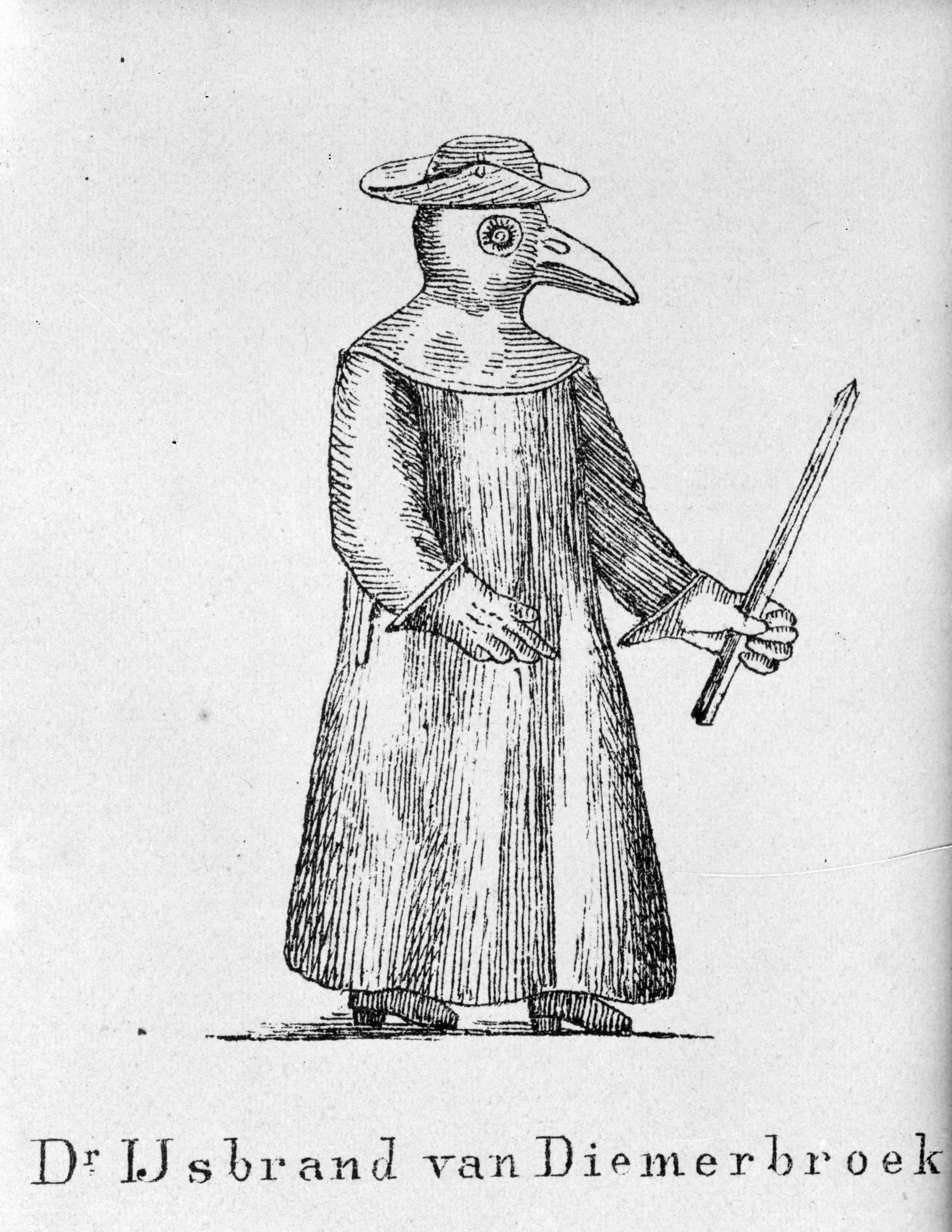
IJsbrand van Diemerbroeck as plague doctor

Isbrand van Diemerbroeck (also IJsbrand or Ysbrand) (13 December 1609 – 16 November 1674) was a Dutch physician, anatomist, and professor.

== Biography ==
Isbrand van Diemerbroeck was born in Montfoort in 1609.

He studied first in Utrecht, and then in Leiden under Daniel Heinsius and Otto Heurnius. He received his doctorate in Medicine from the University of Angers. He worked in Nijmegen in 1635 and 1636, during the Black Death epidemic. He wrote about his experiences in treating the plague in his 1646 work De Peste. He then went to Utrecht and married Elisabeth van Gessel on 18 October 1642. In 1649, he became a professor of medicine and anatomy at Utrecht University, where Regnier de Graaf was a student of his. He was twice rector of the University of Utrecht. He died in Utrecht.

His son Timann van Diemerbroeck, also a physician, collected his father's works in the 1685 Opera omnia.

== Works ==
- De peste, 1646; republished in 1665 by Joan Blaeu (Tractatus de peste in quatuor libros distinctus, truculentissimi morbi historiam ratione et experientia confirmatam exhibens on Google Books), republished in 1687 and 1721; translated into Dutch in 1671, into English in 1722
- Oratio de reducenda ad medicinam chirurgia, 1649
- Disputationum practicarum pars prima et secunda de morbis capitis et thoracis, 1654
- Anatome corporis humani: plurimis novis inventis intructa, 1672, republished 1679; published in Leiden, Lyon and Genève: English translation The Anatomy of Human Bodies by William Salmon appeared in 1689, reprinted in 1694; French translation L' anatomie du corps humain published in 1695 in Lyon
- Opera omnia anatomica et medica, 1685, republished 1687
