= Jean Edelinck =

Flemish engraver

Jan, or Jean Edelinck (c.1640 – 1680), was a Flemish engraver who worked in Paris.

== Life ==
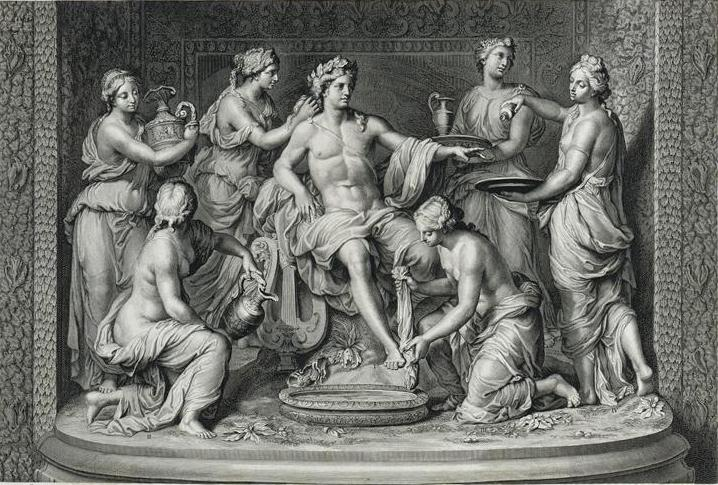
Thetys cave, central group, 1678 engraving of a sculpture by François Girardon and Thomas Regnaudin

He was born in Antwerp, the brother of Gerard Edelinck. He was probably younger than Gerard, though his date of birth is unknown. He preceded his brother to Paris. Joseph Strutt, writing in the late 18th century, compared his work unfavourably to Gerard's, saying that, although he closely imitated his style, "he never equalled him, either in drawing or the execution of the mechanical part of his plates."

He died in Paris in 1680.

== Works ==
Edelinck made several engravings of the statues in the gardens at Versailles, of which Strutt said "they do him great credit, though the effect is cold, and the extremities rather heavy". He also made plates after a portrait of the anatomist Isbrandus de Diemerbroeck by Romeyn de Hooghe, and The Deluge by Alessandro Turchi. The latter was finished after his death by his youngest brother, Gaspard François Edelinck.

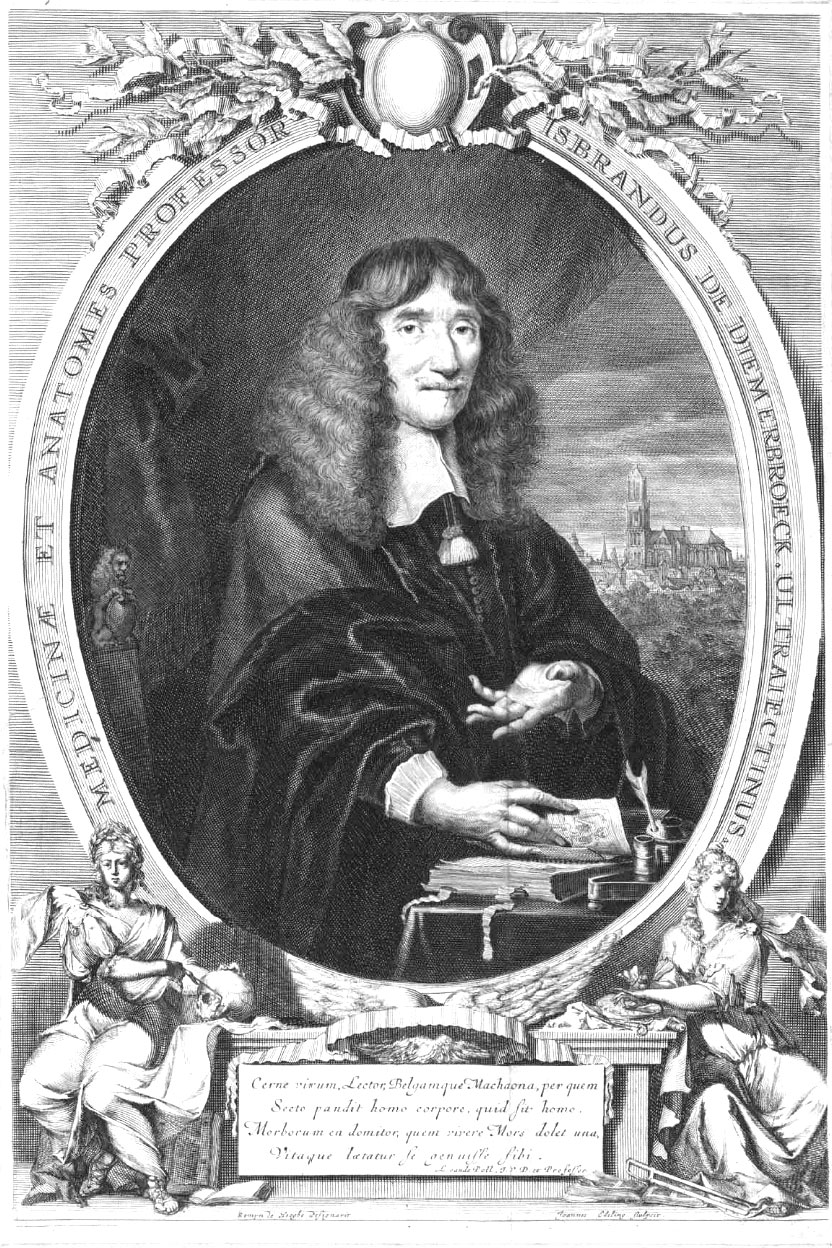
Isbrand van Diemerbroeck, ca. 1670

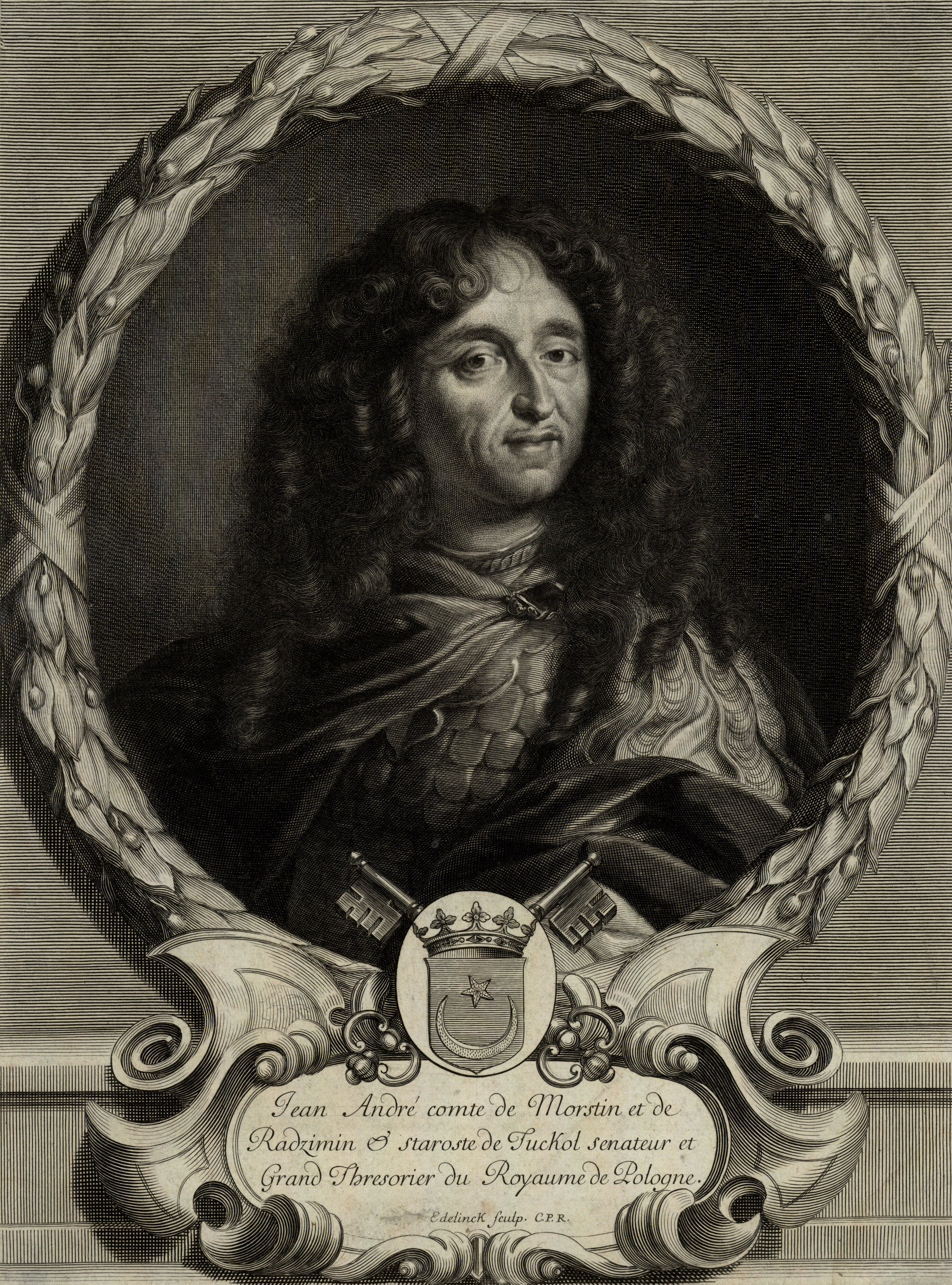
Jan Andrzej Morsztyn, before 1680

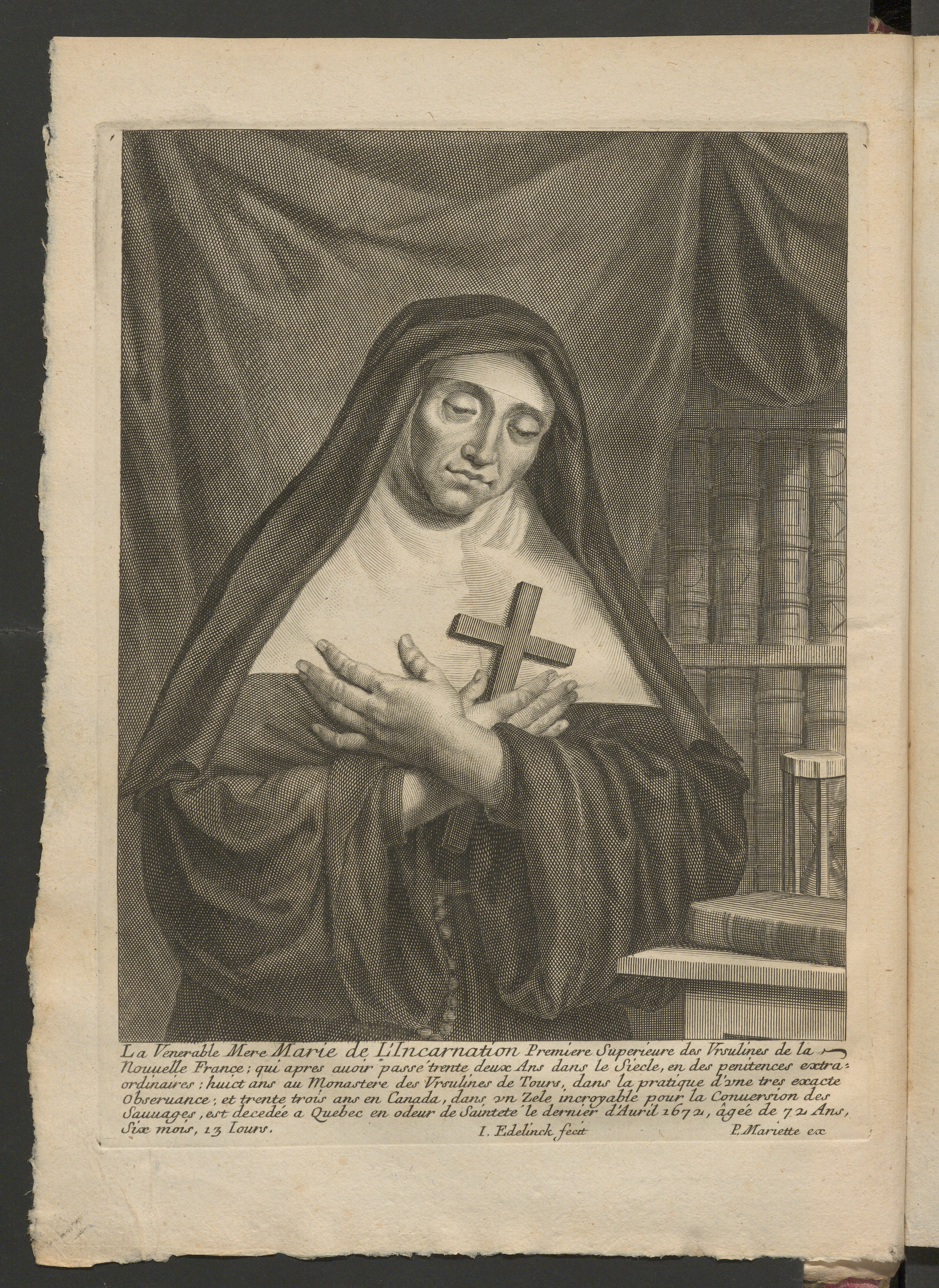
Marie of the Incarnation, ca. 1677
