= Nicolas Edelinck =

French engraver (1681–1767)

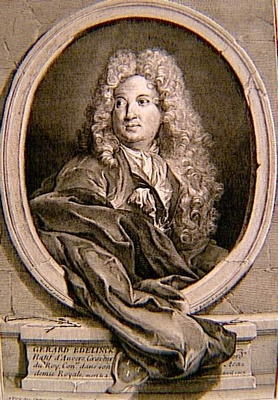
Portrait of Gerard Edelinck by his son Nicolas

Nicolas-Étienne Edelinck (9 April 1681 – 11 May 1767) was a French engraver, was born to a family of engravers in Paris, the eighth son of Gérard Edelinck. Although he had the advantage of his father's instruction, and of studying in Italy, he never rose above mediocrity. He engraved some portraits, and a few plates for the Crozat Collection. He died in Paris in 1768. Among other prints by him are the following:

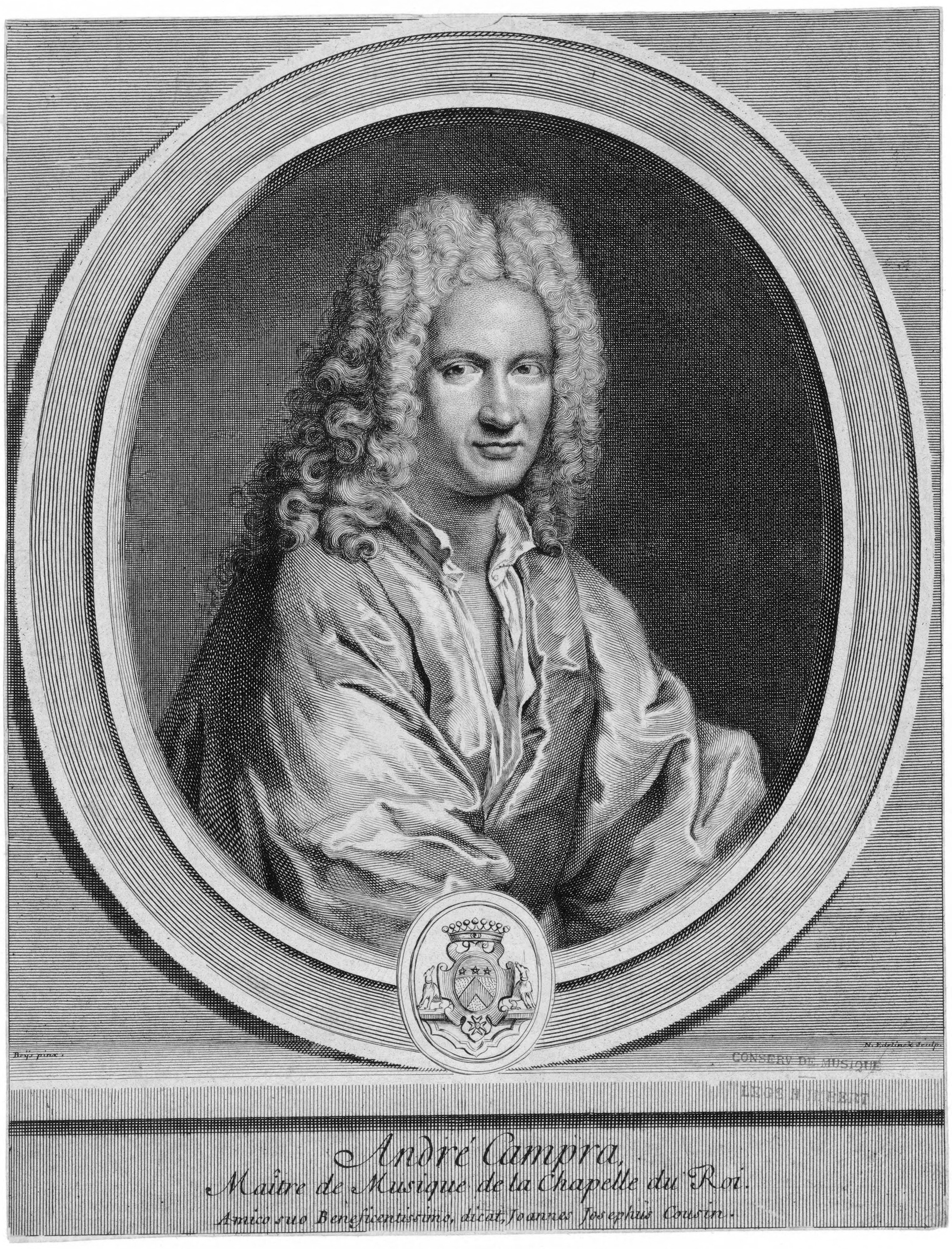
André Campra, 1725; after a painting by André Bouys

- Gerard Edelinck; after Tortebat.
- Cardinal Giulio de' Medici; after Raphael.
- Count Baldassare Castiglione; after the same.
- Philip, Duke of Orleans, Regent of France, on horseback; after J. Ranc.
- Adrien Baillet.
- John Dryden; after Kneller.
- The Virgin and Infant; after Correggio.
- Vertumnus and Pomona; after J. Ranc.

== Biography ==
Born in Paris on April 9, 1681, he was the eighth son of Gérard Edelinck, who took him on as a pupil, but soon sent him to continue his training in Venice, where he befriended Nicolas Vleughels. Despite this advantage, his talent remained mediocre, and according to Pierre-Jean Mariette, “an unforgivable indolence prevented him from exercising an art for which he had a happy disposition”.

He is Pierre-Philippe Choffard advisor.

He died in Paris on May 11, 1767.

== Bibliography ==
- Préaud, Maxime (1998), "Edelinck, Gérard", vol. 9, p. 718, in The Dictionary of Art, edited by Jane Turner. London: Macmillan. ISBN 9781884446009.

Attribution:
