= Pierre-Philippe Choffard =

French draughtsman and engraver

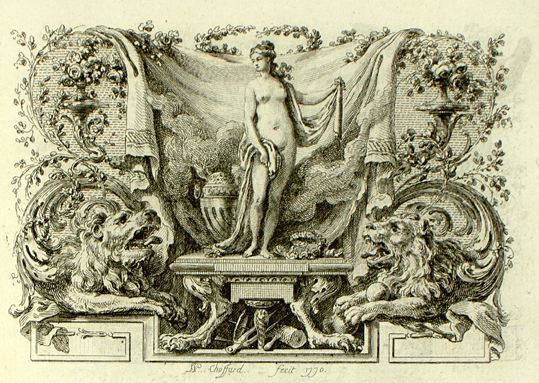
Pygmalion, book vignette from 1770

Pierre-Philippe Choffard (19 March 1731 – 7 March 1809) was a French draughtsman and engraver.

Choffard was born in Paris in 1731. While still very young he showed great aptitude for drawing flowers and ornaments, and was placed with an engraver of maps named Dheulland, but he afterwards received lessons from Babel, an engraver of ornaments, and is said to have had also the benefit of the advice of Nicolas Edelinck, Balechou, and Cochin. Commencing with the cartouches of maps, which date from 1753 to 1756, he next engraved invitation and address cards and book-plates, and these drew attention to his abilities and secured for him the commission to execute the tail-pieces for the celebrated edition of the 'Contes' of La Fontaine published by the Fermiers-Généraux in 1762. The fertility of invention and the taste displayed by the artist in these gems of art are known and admired by all. The series ends with his own portrait in profile as the tail-piece of 'Le Rossignol.'

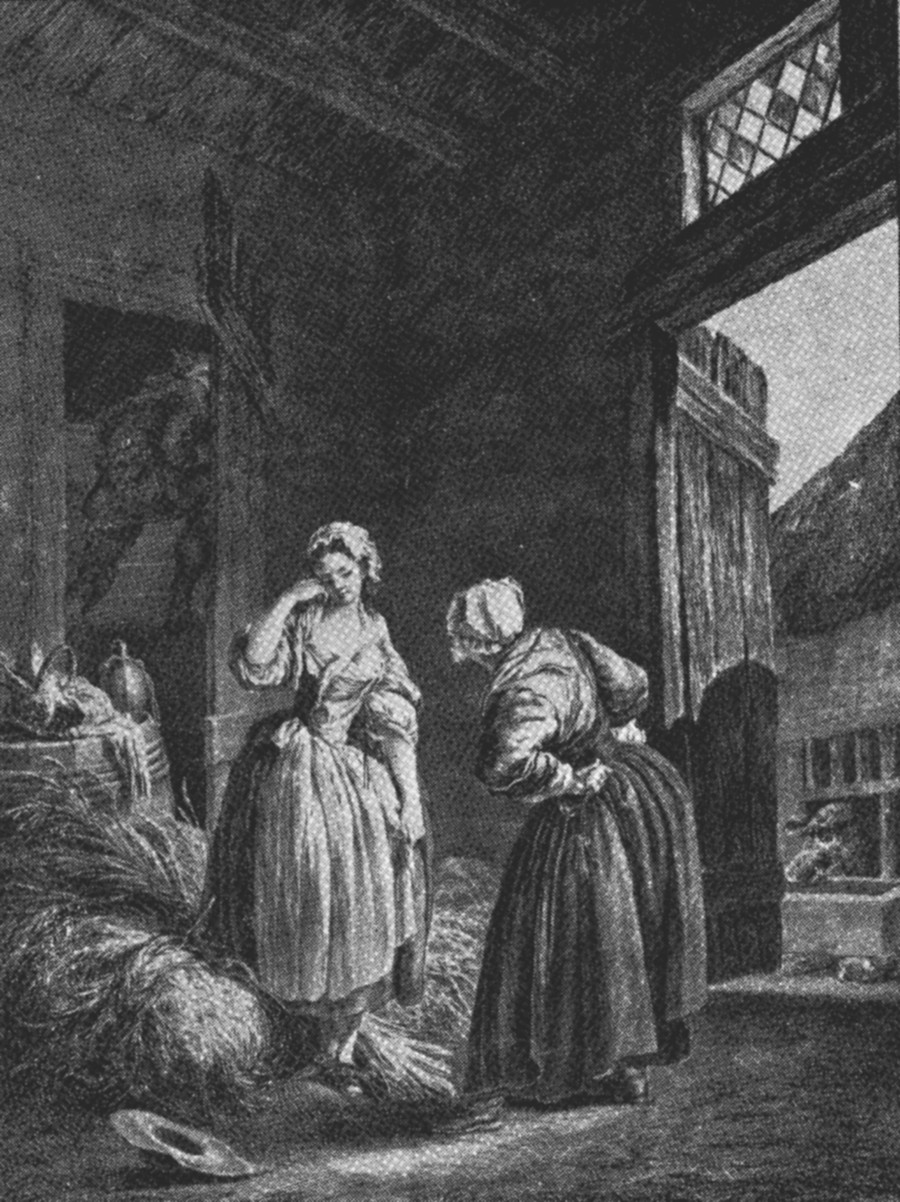
The reprimand, lithograph of an engraving by Choffard after Pierre-Antoine Baudouin's 1789 painting.

To these succeeded, among a host of minor pieces, the large ornaments placed at the head of each book of the Ovid's 'Metamorphoses' of 1767–1771, the headpieces to Saint-Lambert' s poem, 'Les Saisons,' issued in 1769, and again with some alterations in 1775, those to Imbert's poem, 'Le Jugement de Paris,' 1772, and the tail-pieces to Desormeaux's 'Histoire de la Maison de Bourbon,' published in the years 1779–1788. All these combined to establish his reputation as a designer of ornament without a rival. Besides these, the ornamental pieces which he executed for the 'Voyage pittoresque de Naples et de Sicile' of Saint-Non, published in 1781, and the plates of 'Les Amants surpris,' 'Les Amours champêtres,' and 'Marchez tout doux, parlez tout bas,' after Baudouin, and a view of Narbonne, after Monnet, must be ranked among his best works.

Choffard wrote in 1804 a 'Notice historique sur l'art de la Gravure,' and was about to undertake a more extensive work when he was struck down by death at Paris in 1809. MM. Portalis and Béraldi give in their 'Graveurs du Dix-huitieme Siècle' a detailed catalogue of his engravings, which number 855.
