= Ex-Voto de 1662 =

Painting by Philippe de Champaigne

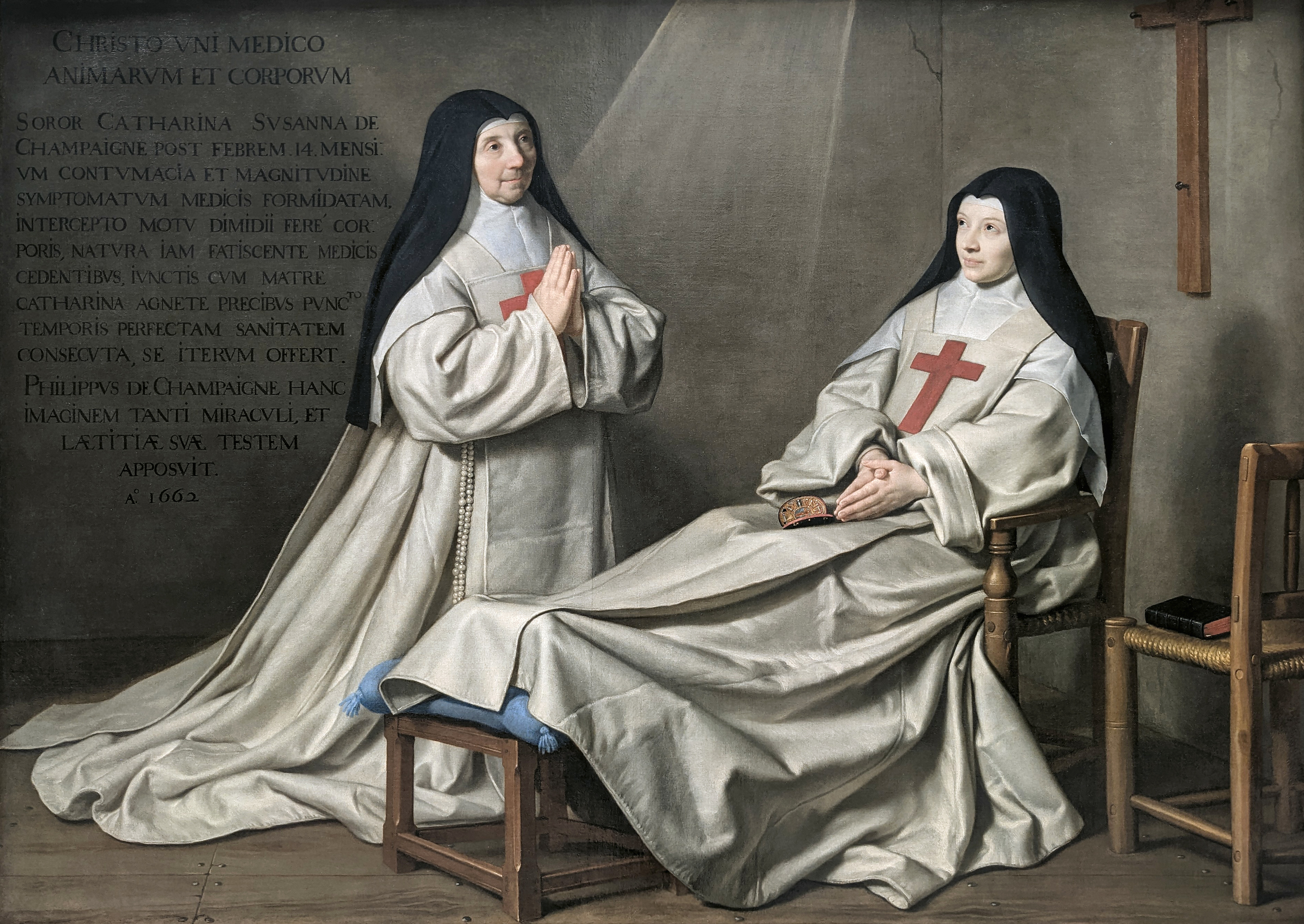
- Artist: Philippe de Champaigne
- Year: 1662
- Medium: oil on canvas
- Dimensions: 164.8 cm × 228.9 cm (64 in × 92 in)
- Location: Musée du Louvre; Paris

Ex-Voto de 1662 is a painting by the French artist Philippe de Champaigne now in the Louvre in Paris. One of Champaigne's most accomplished works, it is a votive offering (an ex-voto) by the painter which depicts a miracle involving his daughter that is said to have occurred at the Port-Royal-des-Champs Cistercian convent.

A ray of light illuminates Mother-Superior Agnès Arnauld, who experienced on the ninth day of her novena for Champaigne's daughter, Sister Catherine de Sainte Suzanne, the hope that a cure would come for Sister Catherine. Catherine (seated, praying) was the painter's only surviving child, and had been suffering from a paralyzing illness. Until that point, prayer and medical treatments ("potions, baths, unctions, and thirty bleedings") had proven futile. After the Mother-Superior's novena, Sister Catherine soon attempted to walk, and found herself increasingly mobile; the illness no longer seemed present. The painting is a statement of gratitude by the father for the cure of his daughter. The miracle it portrays also symbolized hope for the cause of the Jansenists, who were subject to persecution by ecclesiastical and civil authorities. The Jansenists followed Cornelius Jansen, who reasserted the theology of St. Augustine, and were in conflict with the Jesuits. Their refusal to sign a document condemning five propositions found in Jansen's Augustinus resulted in their being deprived of the sacraments and confined to the abbey, which was eventually torn down.

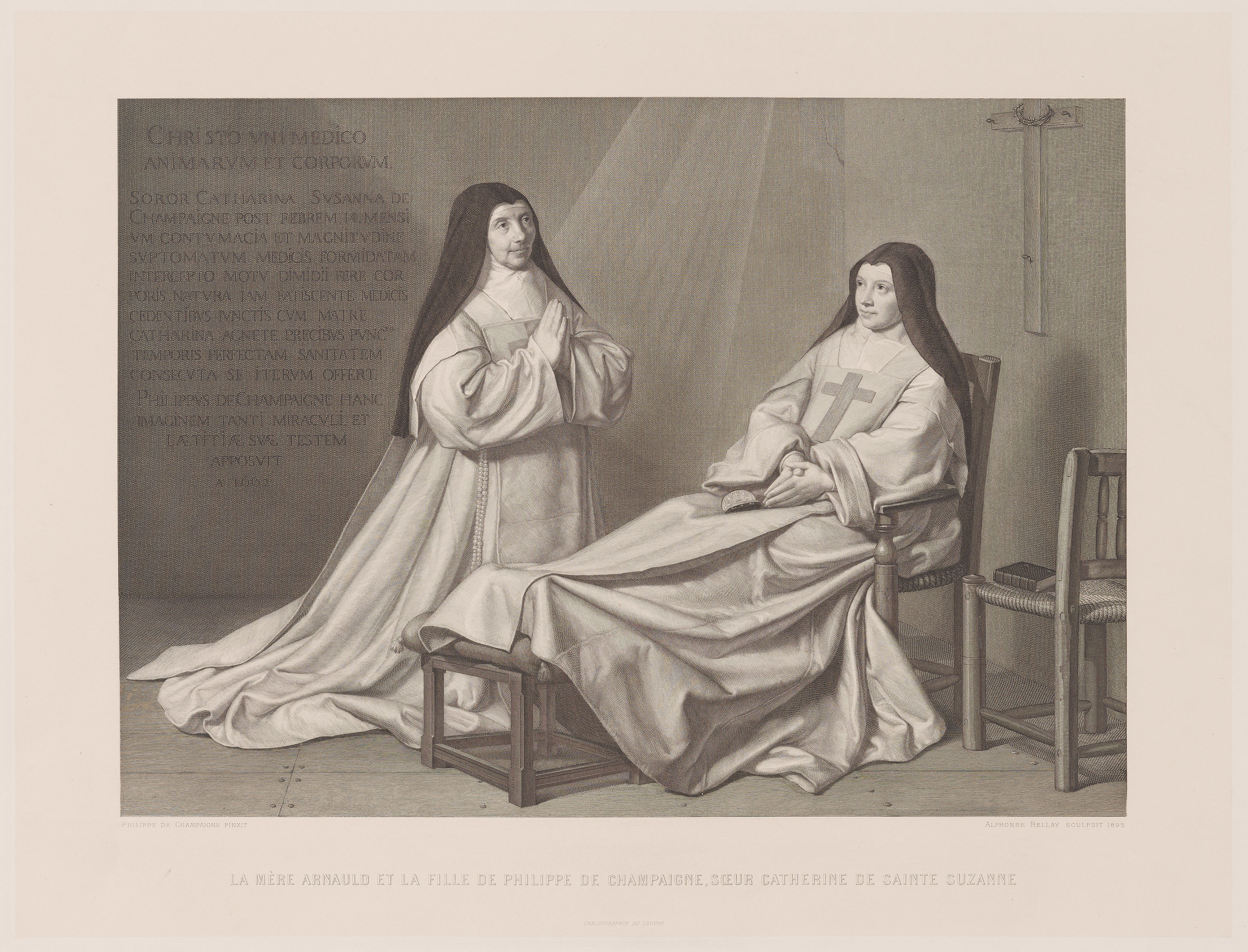
Charles Paul Alphonse Bellay after Philippe de Champaigne, Mother Catherine-Agnes Arnaud and Sister Catherine de Sainte-Suzanne, daughter of Philippe de Champaigne, 1662, engraving

The composition is unique among Champaigne's work, with the two figures having richly defined, "sculptural" forms, lending them vitality and setting them off from the restricted hues and "angular simplicity" of the setting (Rand 1990). The figures dominate the canvas, giving the painting a monumental quality. The texture, weight, and folds of the robes are modeled in great detail, revealing Champaigne's Flemish training. His decision to portray the moment that Mother-Superior Agnès is instilled with hope, rather than the cure itself, is evident in the fact that the ray of light illuminates her instead of his daughter. The light develops a "chronological tension" that suggests "what will happen as a result of what is happening".

The painting includes a Latin inscription on the wall on the left of the painting. Neither the text nor the lettering were Champaigne's work.

CHRISTO VNI MEDICO
ANIMARVM ET CORPORVM

SOROR CATHARINA SVSANNA DE
CHAMPAIGNE POST FEBREM 14 MENSI
(C)VM CONTVMACIA ET MAGNITVDINE
SYMPTOMATVM MEDICIS FORMIDATAM
INTERCEPTO MOTV DIMIDII FERE COR
PORIS NATVRA IAM FATISCENTE MEDICIS
CEDENTIBVS IVNCTIS CVM MATRE
CATHARINA AGNETE PRECIBVS PVNC^{TO}
TEMPORIS PERFECTAM SANITATEM
CONSECVTA SE ITERVM OFFERT.

PHILIPPVS DE CHAMPAIGNE HANC
IMAGINEM TANTI MIRACVLI ET
LAETITIAE SVAE TESTEM
APPOSVIT
A^{O} 1662

The inscription, addressed to Christ, recounts that Sister Catherine suffered for 14 months from a high fever and that half her body was paralyzed; that she prayed with Mother Agnès and her health was restored, and again she offered herself to Christ; and that Champaigne offers the painting as a testament to this miracle and to express his joy.

== Sources ==
- Gowing, Lawrence (1987). Paintings in the Louvre. New York: Stewart, Tabori & Chang. ISBN 1-55670-007-5
- Rand, Olan A. Jr. (Mar 1983). "Philippe de Champaigne and the Ex-Voto of 1662: A Historical Perspective". The Art Bulletin. 65 (1). College Art Association: 78–93. doi:10.2307/3050300. JSTOR 3050300.
- Rand, Jr., Olan A. (1990). "Philippe de Champaigne" in James Vinson (ed.), International Dictionary of Art and Artists vol. 2, Art. Detroit: St. James Press; pp. 418–19. ISBN 1-55862-001-X.
