= Gérard Edelinck =

Flemish engraver (1640–1707)

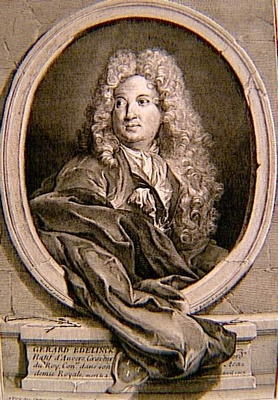
Portrait of Gérard Edelinck by his son Nicolas

Gérard Edelinck (20 October 1640 (baptized) – 2 April 1707) was a copper-plate engraver and print publisher of Flemish origin, who worked in Paris from 1666 and became a naturalized French citizen in 1675.

== Life ==
Edelinck was born in Antwerp, where he received his early training under the engravers Gaspar Huybrechts (1619–1684) and Cornelius Galle the Younger. He went to Paris in 1666, where he worked with his fellow Fleming Nicolas Pitau the elder. To improve himself further he subsequently studied under François de Poilly, Robert Nanteuil, and Philippe de Champaigne. These masters likewise had soon done all they could to help him onwards, and Edelinck ultimately took the first rank among line engravers.

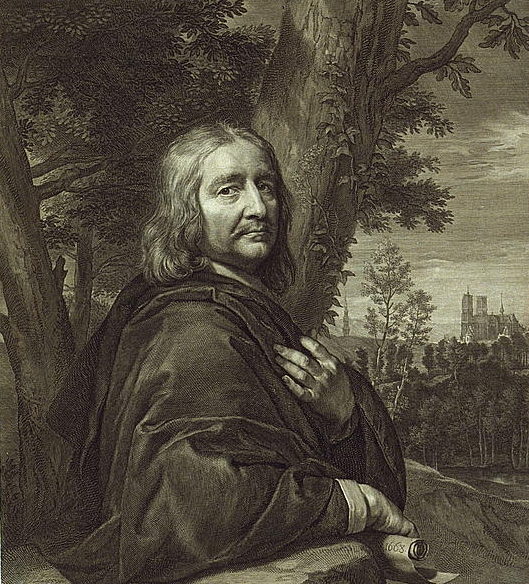
Philippe de Champaigne

His excellence was generally acknowledged; and having become known to Louis XIV he was appointed, on the recommendation of Le Brun, teacher at the academy established at the Gobelins manufactory for the training of workers in tapestry. He was also entrusted with the execution of several important works. In 1677 he won admission to the Académie royale de peinture et de sculpture (Royal Academy of Painting and Sculpture) with his Portrait of Philippe de Champaigne, engraved after a self-portrait.

== Work ==
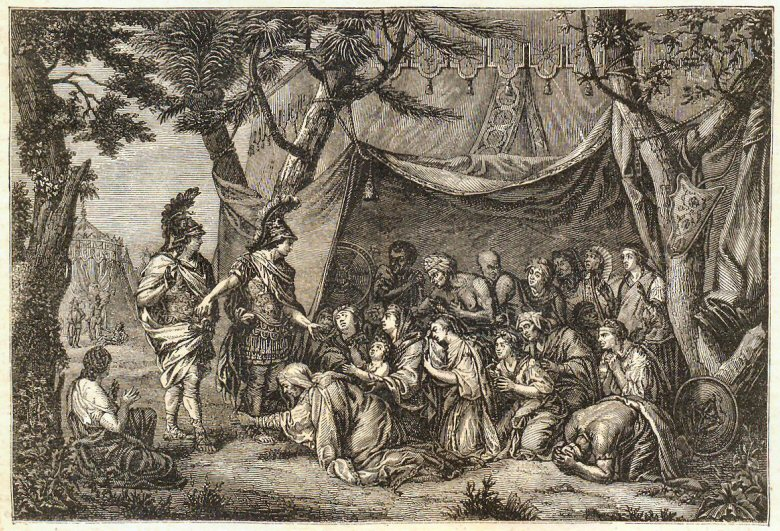
Alexander and Hephaistion visit the family of Darius in their tent after the battle of Issus, engraved by Gérard Edelinck from a painting by Charles le Brun

Edelinck stands apart from both his predecessors and contemporaries because his skill was not confined to any single aspect of engraving. Some engravers excelled in the accurate rendering of form, others in light and shade, color, or the texture of different surfaces. Edelinck mastered all of these elements and brought them together through his exceptional command of the burin. What distinguishes his work is the balance among these qualities: no single element calls attention to itself, but each contributes to the unity and overall effect of the engraving.

Edelinck was especially good as an engraver of portraits, and executed prints of many of the most eminent persons of his time. Among these are those of Le Brun, Rigaud, Champaigne, Nanteuil, La Fontaine, Colbert, John Dryden, Descartes, Jean-Baptiste Lully, etc. He died at Paris in 1707. His younger brother Jean, and his son Nicholas, were also engravers.

== Works ==
Among his most famous works are:

- Holy Family, after Raphael
- Penitent Magdalene, after Charles le Brun
- Alexander at the Tent of Darius, after Le Brun
- Combat of Four Knights, after Leonardo da Vinci
- Christ surrounded with Angels, after Le Brun
- St. Louis praying, after Le Brun
- St Charles Borromeo before a crucifix, after Le Brun
