= Philippe de Champaigne =

French painter (1602–1674)

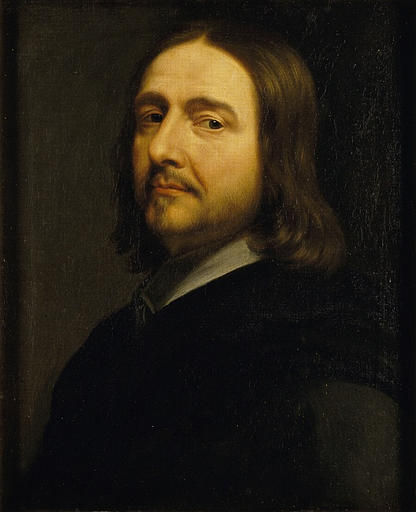
- Self-portrait, Museum of Grenoble
- Born: Philippe de Champaigne; 26 May 1602; Brussels, Southern Netherlands
- Died: 12 August 1674 (aged 72); Paris, France
- Known for: Painting
- Movement: Baroque

Philippe de Champaigne (French pronunciation: [filip də ʃɑ̃paɲ]; 26 May 1602 – 12 August 1674) was a Brabant-born French Baroque era painter, a major exponent of French Baroque painting. He was a founding member of the Académie royale de peinture et de sculpture in Paris, the premier art institution in the Kingdom of France during the Ancien Régime.

Especially in the 1630s and 1640s, he was the leading French court painter of portraits and religious subjects. He continued to work almost until his death, exhibiting a Supper at Emmaus in 1673.

== Life and work ==
Born of a poor family in Brussels (Duchy of Brabant, Southern Netherlands), during the reign of the Archduke Albert and Archduchess Isabella, Champaigne was a pupil of the landscape painter Jacques Fouquier. After turning down opportunities to visit Italy, and to join Rubens' studio, in 1621 he moved to Paris, where he worked as an independent master from about 1624. He met Nicolas Poussin and painted a landscape for him. From 1625 to 1627 he assisted Nicolas Duchesne, whose daughter he eventually married, in decorating Queen Marie de Medicis' Palais du Luxembourg. According to Houbraken, Duchesne was angry at Champaigne for becoming more popular than he was at court, and so Champaigne returned to Brussels to live with his brother. It was only after he received news of Duchesne's death that he returned to marry his daughter, in 1628.

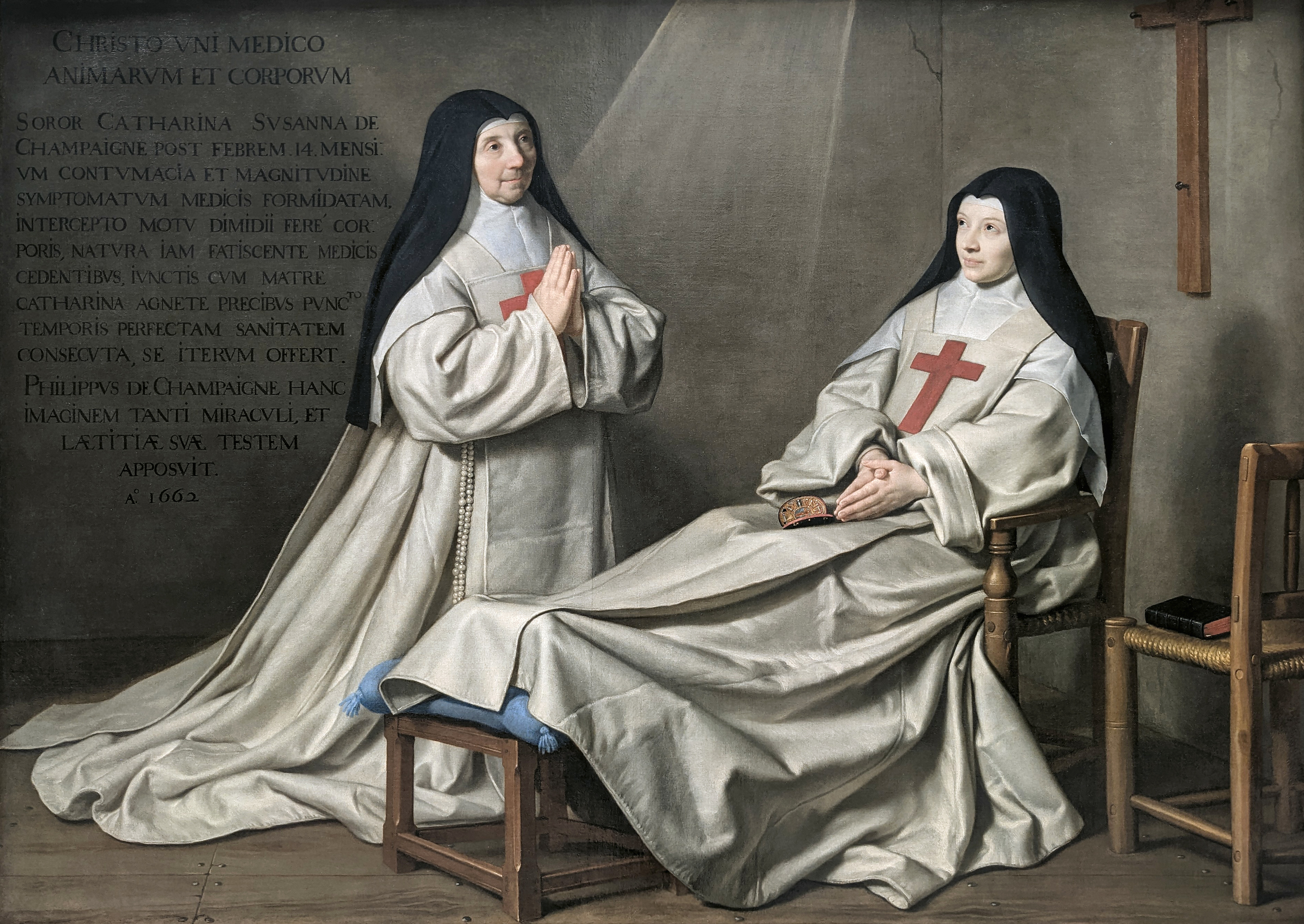
Ex-Voto de 1662, Louvre

After the death of Duchesne, Champaigne succeeded him as Peintre de la Reine ("the Queen's Painter") with a salary of 1200 livres, and in 1629 took French nationality. He made several paintings for Notre Dame Cathedral in Paris, dating from 1638. He also drew several cartoons for tapestries. He also decorated the Carmelite Church of Faubourg Saint-Jacques, one of the favorite churches of the Queen Mother. This site was destroyed during the French Revolution, but there are several paintings now preserved in museums, that were part of the original design, such as The Presentation in the Temple in Dijon, the Resurrection of Lazarus in Grenoble, and the Assumption of the Virgin in the Louvre.

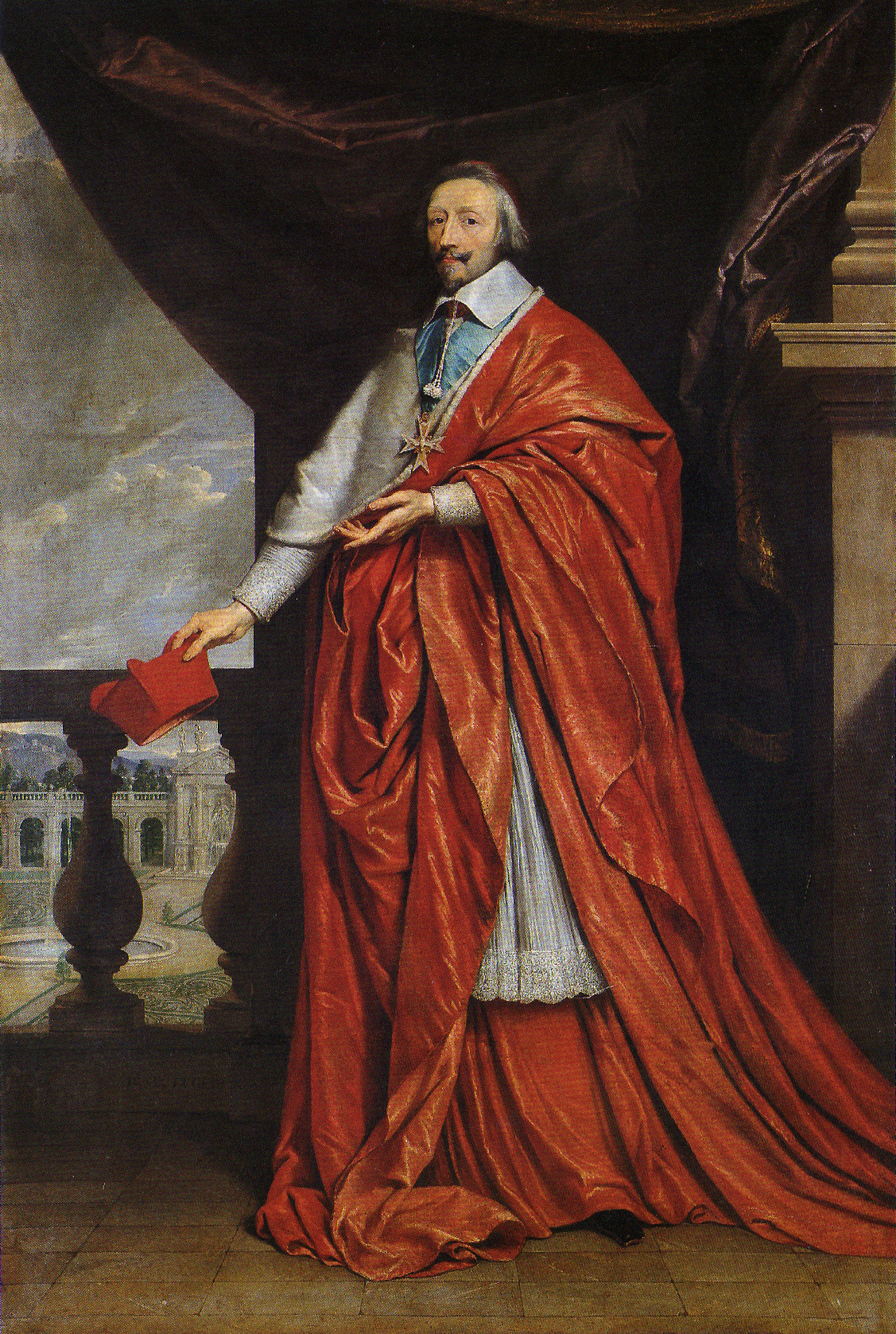
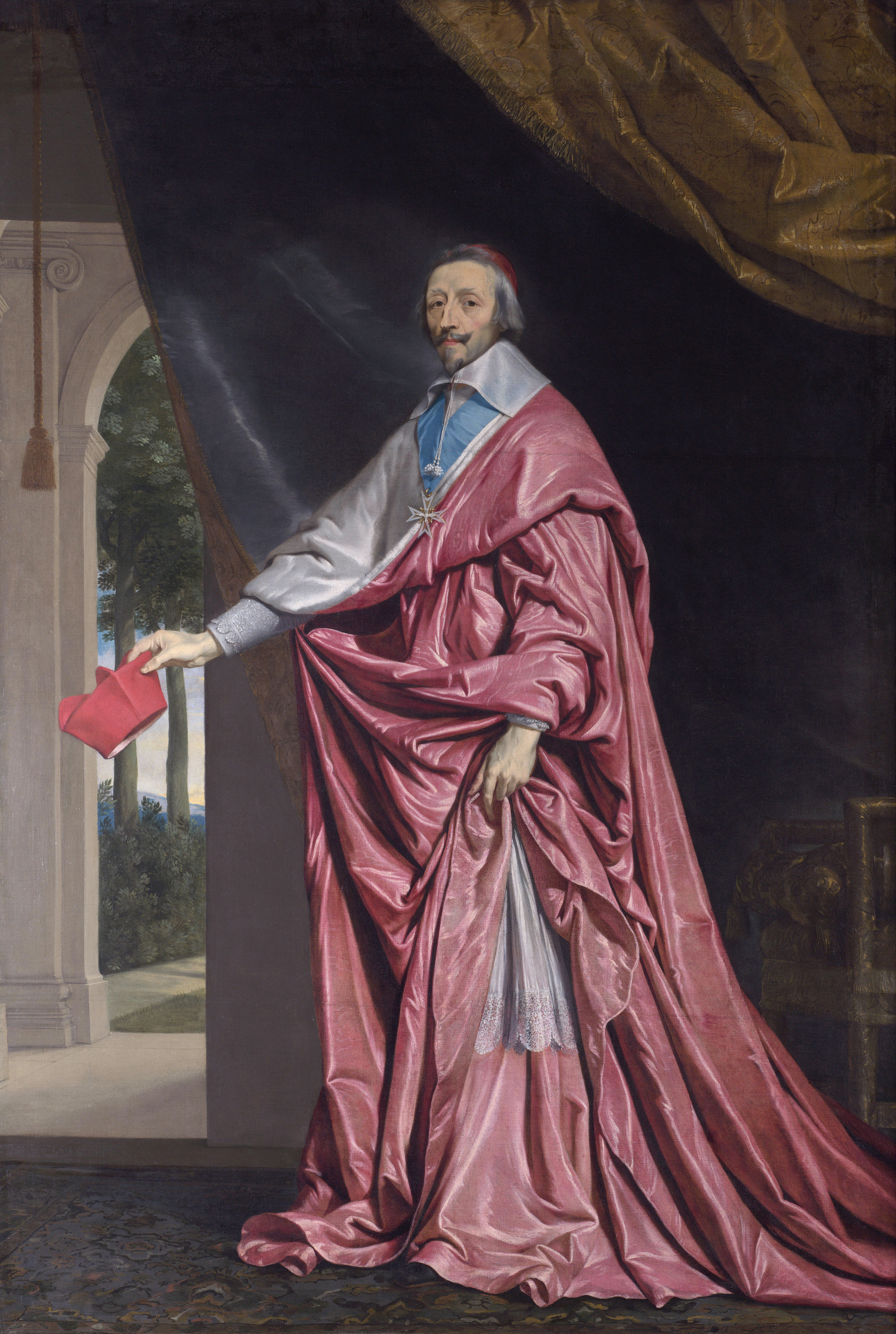
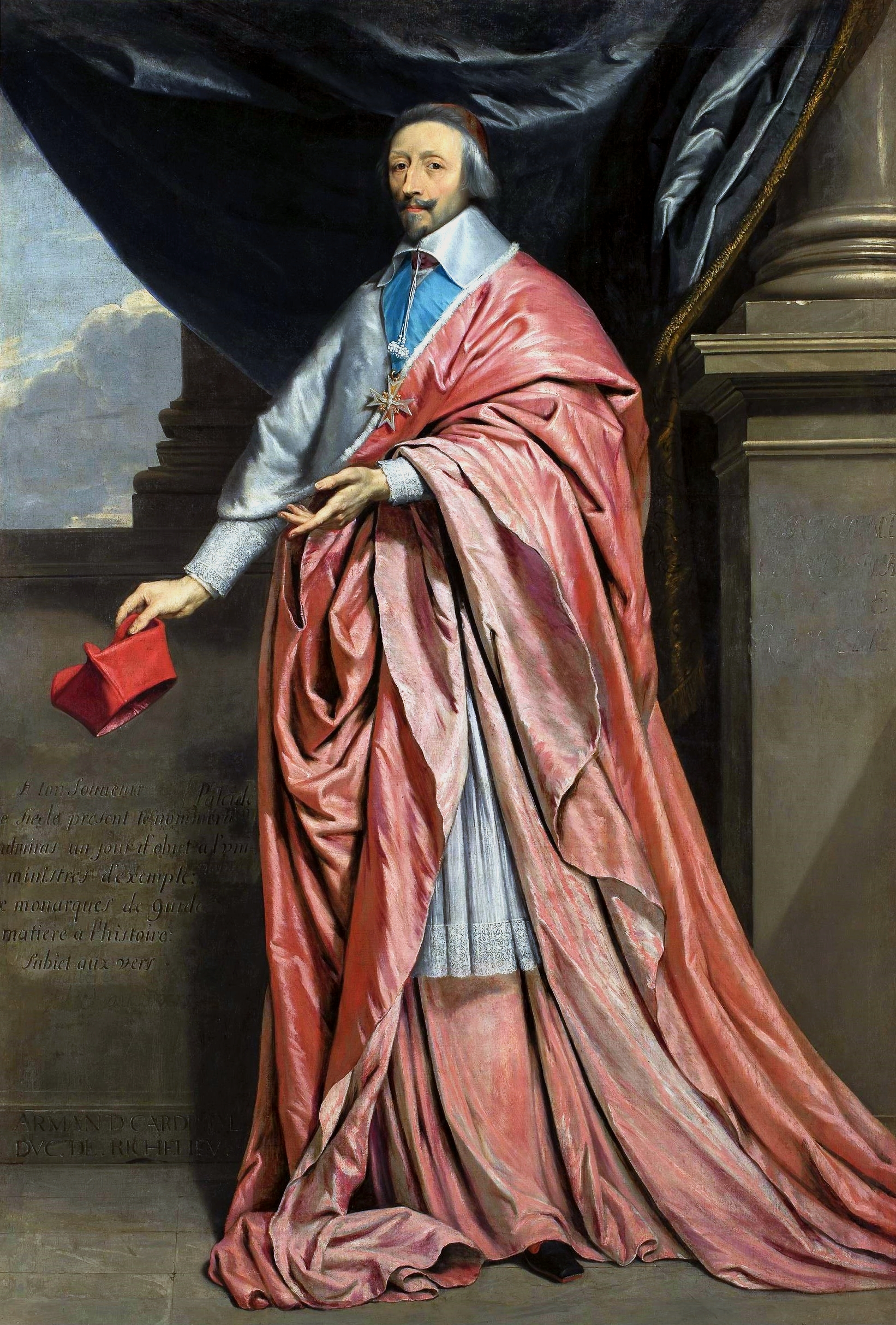
Three of the 11 versions of Champaigne's portrait of Cardinal Richelieu

He also worked for Cardinal Richelieu, for whom he decorated the Palais Cardinal, the dome of the Sorbonne and other buildings. Champaigne was the only artist who was allowed to paint Richelieu enrobed as a cardinal, which he did eleven times. He was a founding member of the Académie de peinture et de sculpture in 1648. Later in his life (from 1640 onwards), he came under the influence of Jansenism. After his paralysed daughter was allegedly miraculously cured at the nunnery of Port-Royal, he painted the celebrated but atypical picture Ex-Voto de 1662, now in the Louvre, which represents the artist's daughter with Mother-Superior Agnès Arnauld.

=== Career ===
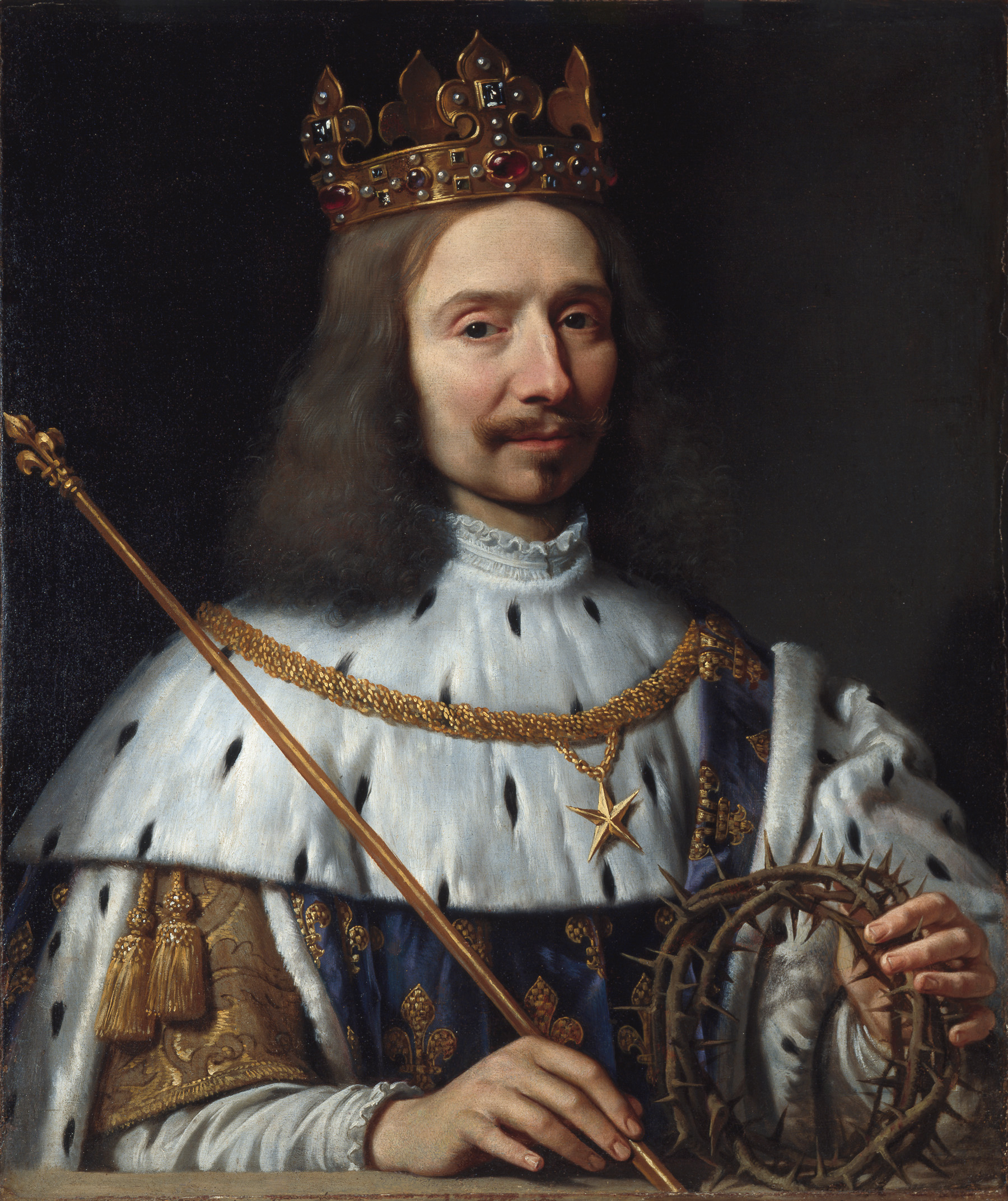
French poet Vincent Voiture depicted as Saint Louis, c. 1640–1648

Champaigne produced a large number of paintings, mainly religious works and portraits. Influenced by Rubens at the beginning of his career, his style later became more austere. Philippe de Champaigne remains an exceptional painter thanks to the brilliance of the colors in his paintings and the stern strength of his compositions.

He portrayed the entire French court, the French high nobility, royalty, high members of the church and the state, parliamentarians and architects, and other notable people. His portrait of the poet Vincent Voiture was created around 1649 as the frontispiece for Voiture's published Works (published posthumously in 1650). The portrait is highly unusual in that Champaigne later reworked it as a portrait of a religious figure, Saint Louis (King Louis IX), to enable Voiture's daughter to keep it with her when she entered a convent.

In depicting their faces, he refused to show a transitory expression, instead capturing the psychological essence of the person.

His works can be seen in public buildings, private collections, churches such as Val-de-Grâce, Sorbonne, Saint Severin, Saint-Merri, Saint-Médard and in the Basilica of Notre-Dame du Port in Clermont-Ferrand.

Champaigne was prominent enough in his time as to be mentioned in the 1897 play Cyrano de Bergerac in a line by Ragueneau referencing Cyrano: "Truly, I should not look to find his portrait / By the grave hand of Philippe de Champaigne."

His only son died young, after which his nephew Jean Baptiste de Champaigne was brought from Brussels to be his main pupil. Others included Nicolas de Plattemontagne. During his last period Champaigne painted mainly religious subjects and family members. He died in Paris in 1674.

== Gallery ==
Selected works

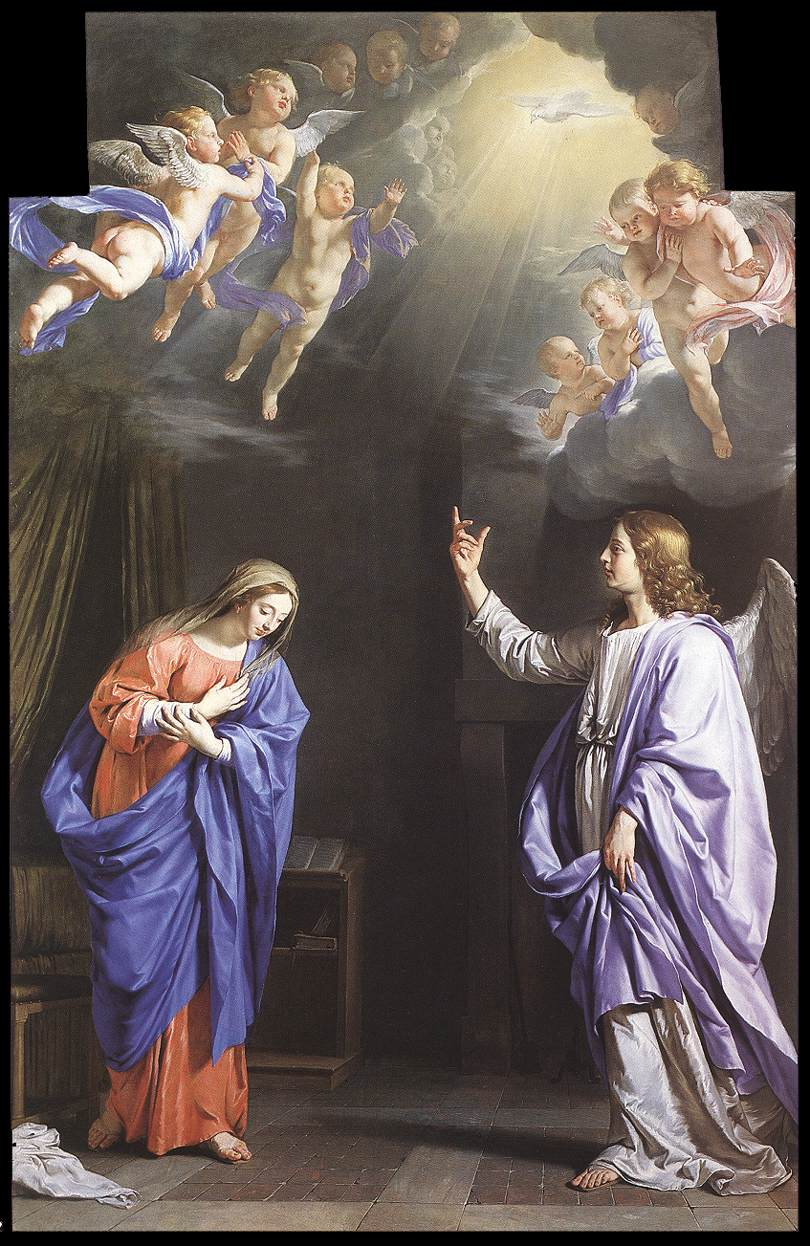
Annunciation, c. 1645, Wallace Collection

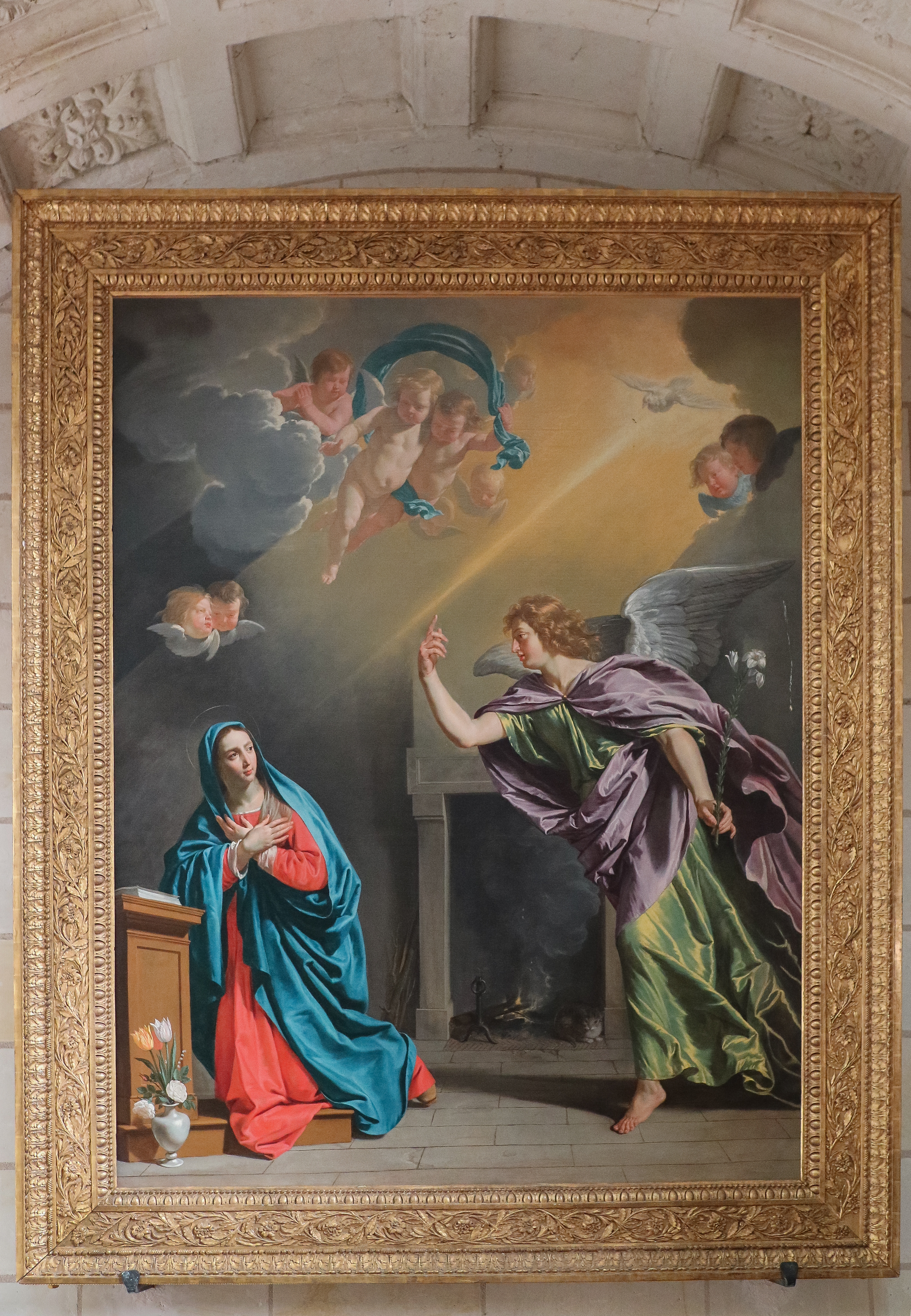
Annunciation, c. 1636, Saint-Jean-Baptiste de Montrésor Church

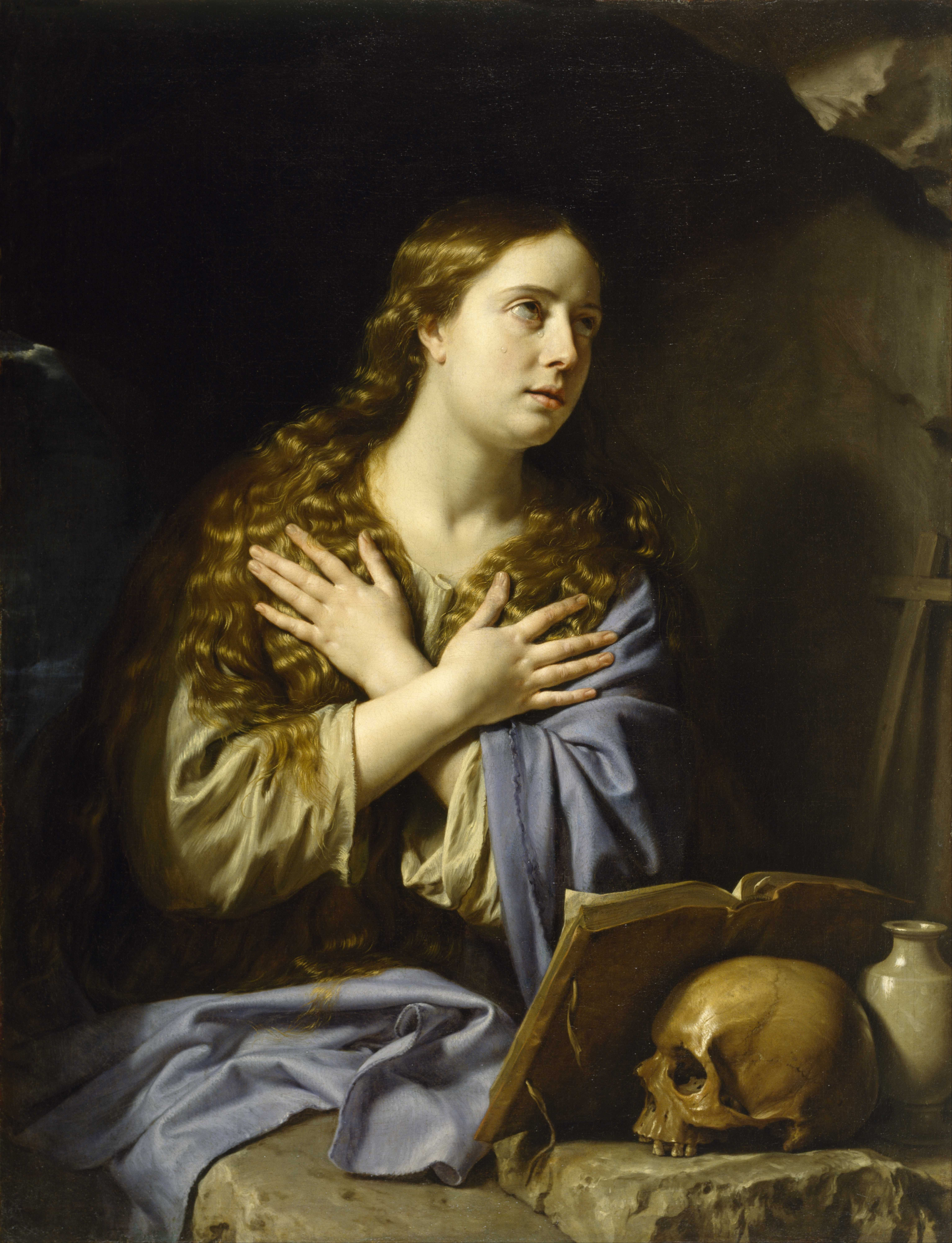
The Repentant Magdalen, 1648

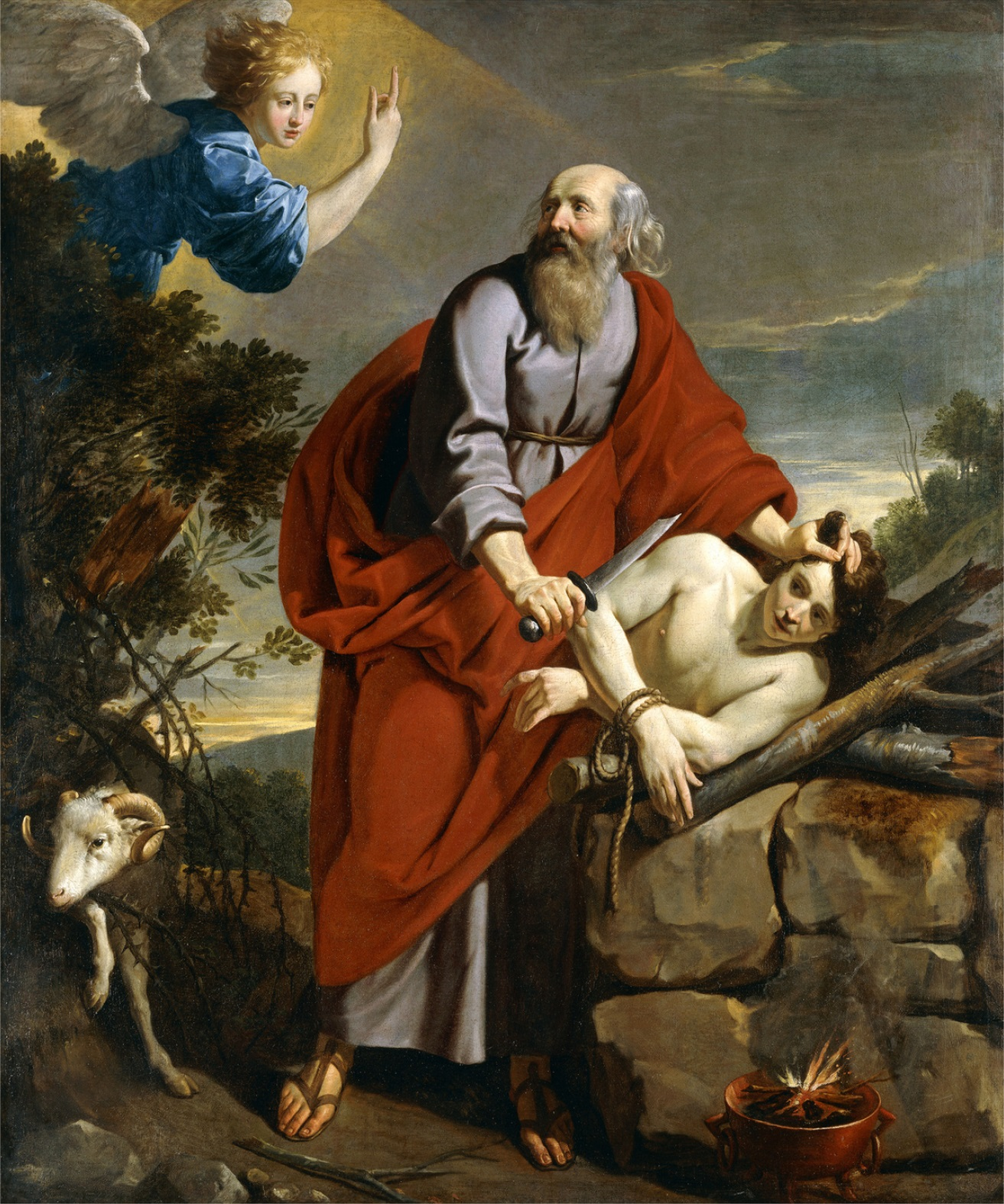
Sacrifice of Isaac

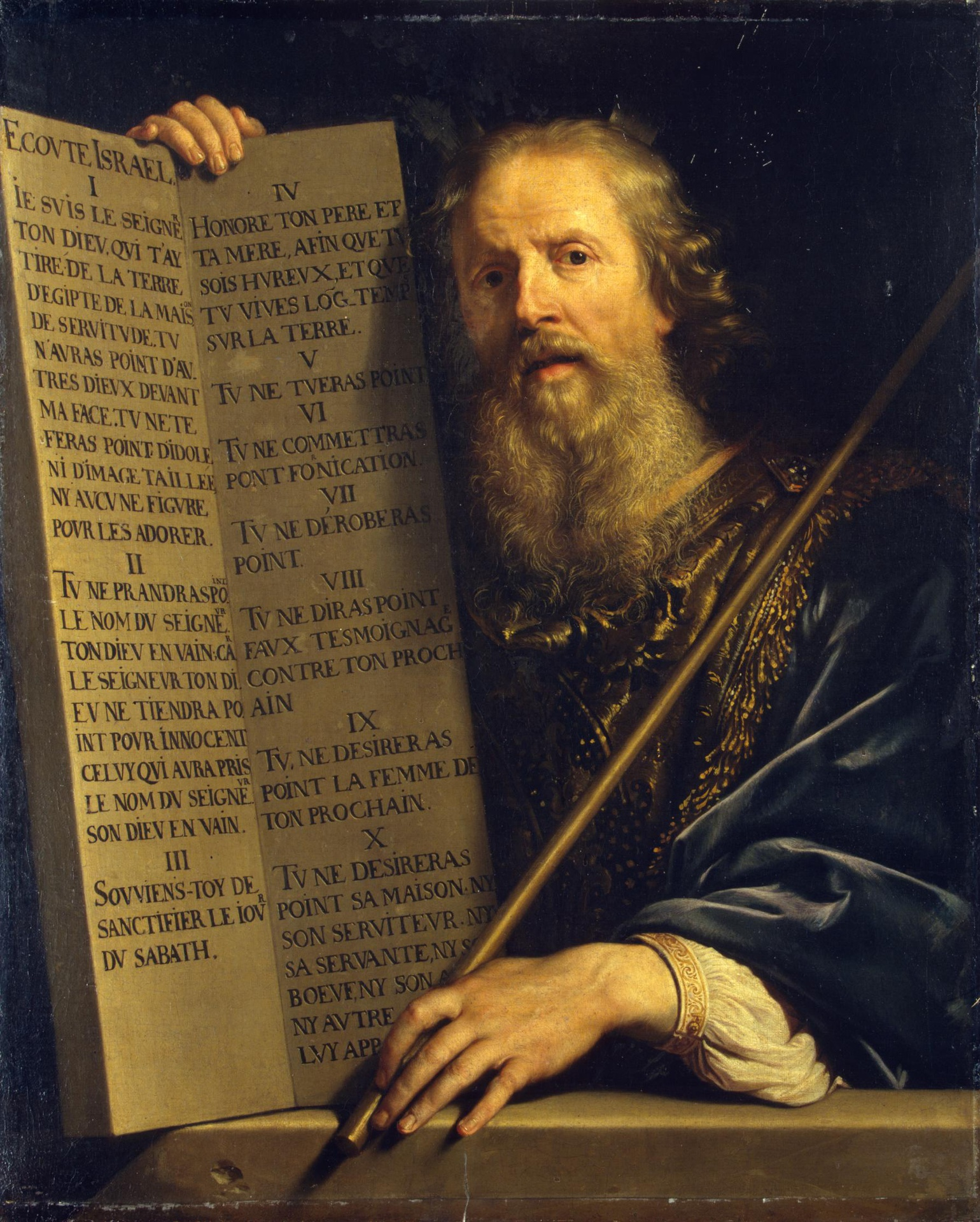
Moses with the Ten Commandments

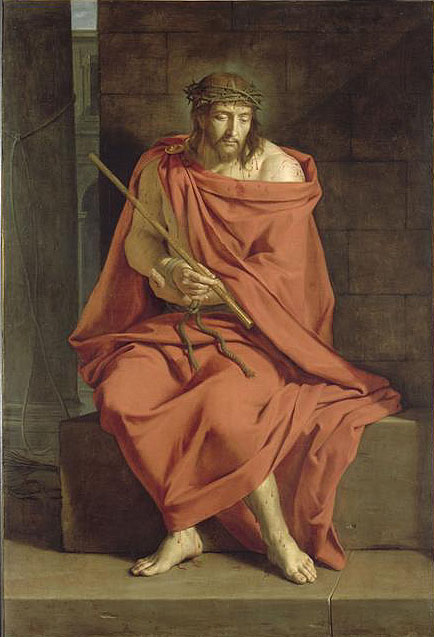
Ecce Homo

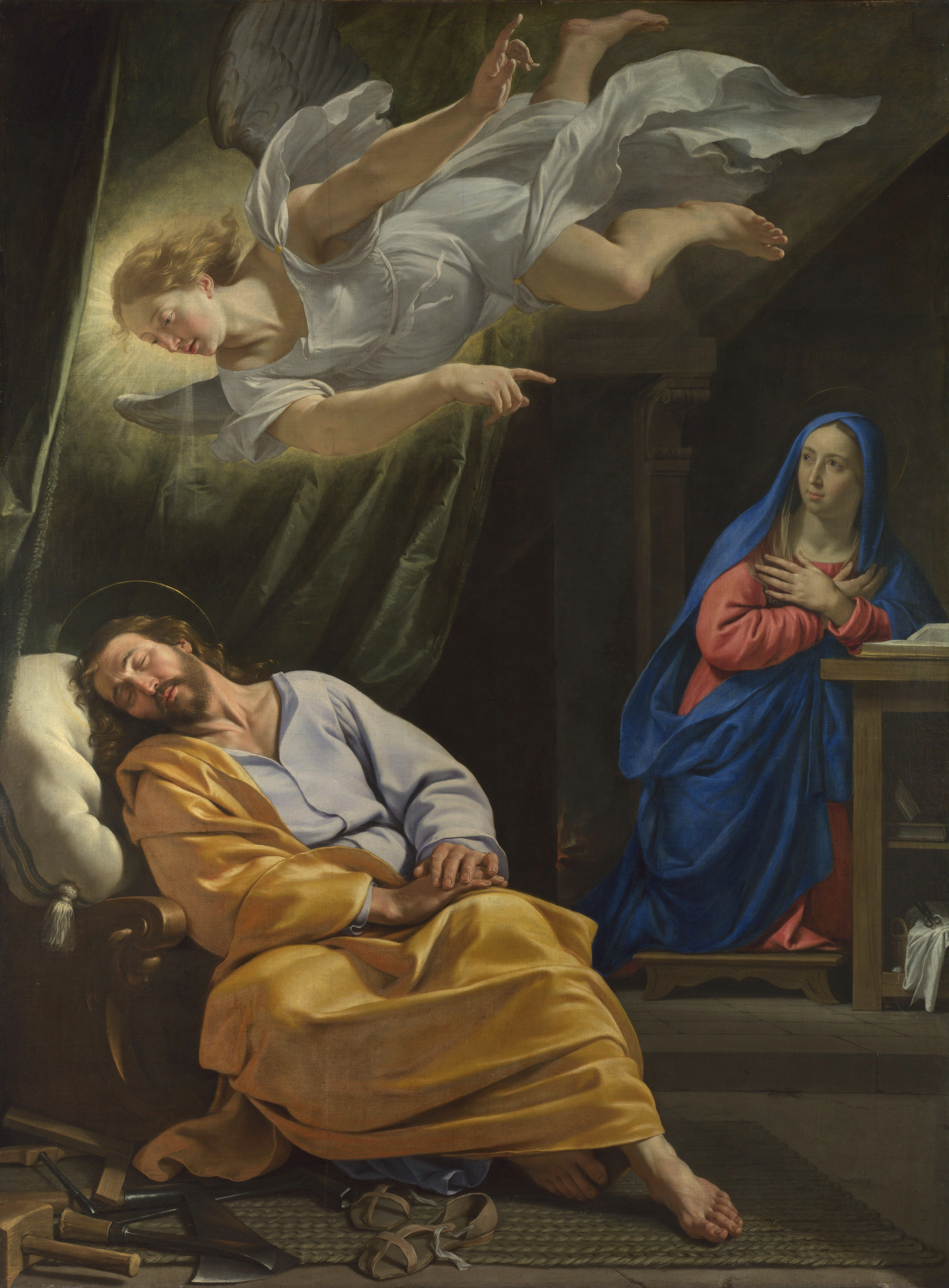
The Dream of Saint Joseph, 1642–43, National Gallery, London

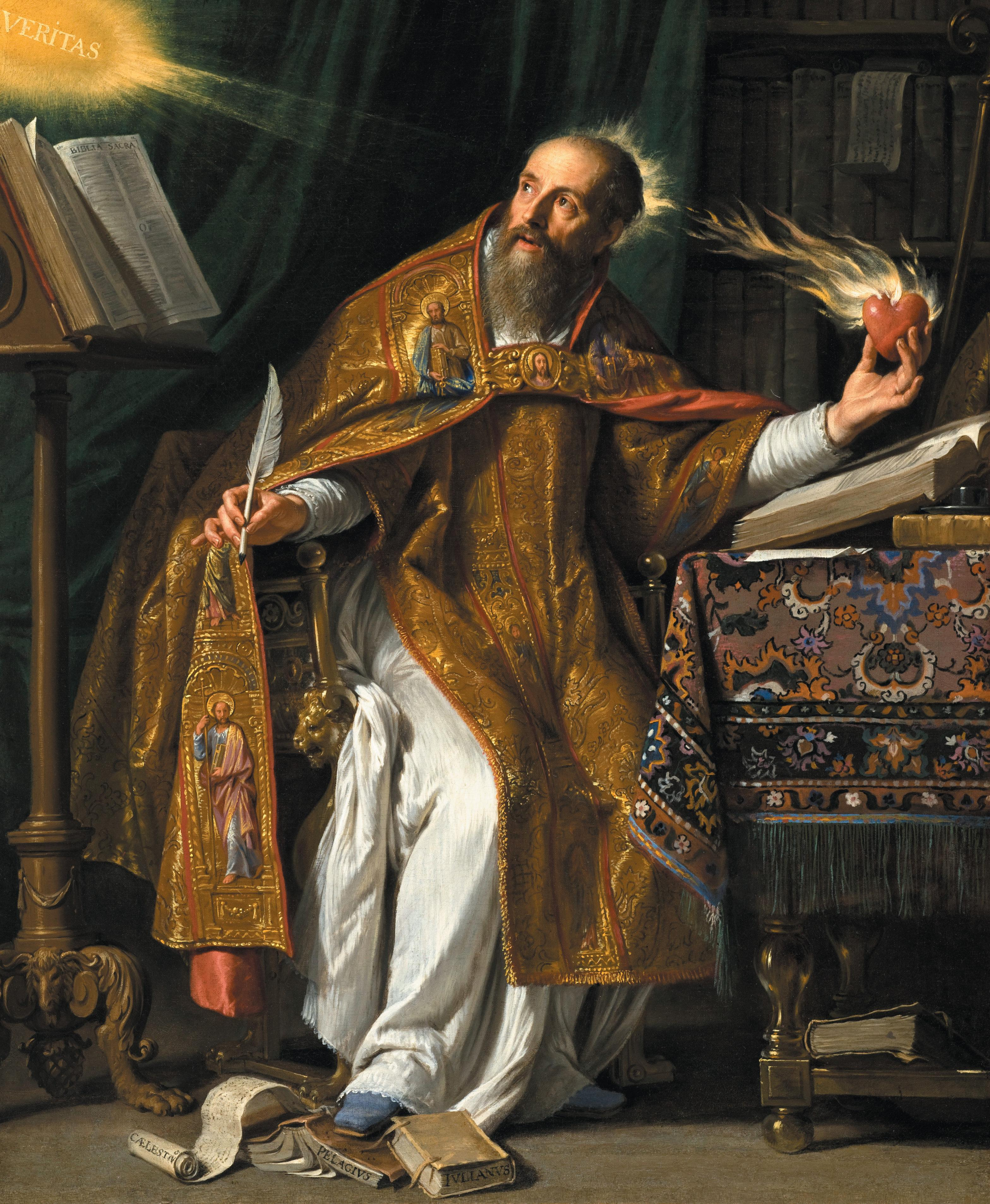
Saint Augustine, 1645–1650

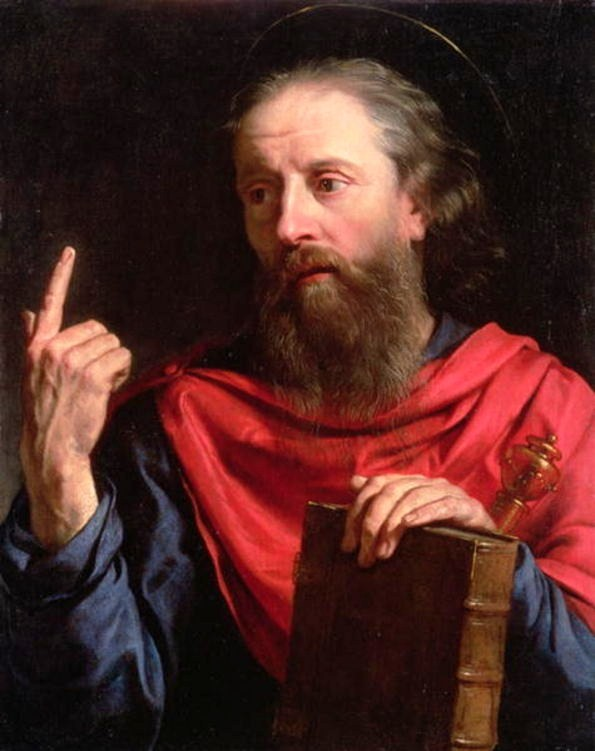
Saint Paul
Portraits

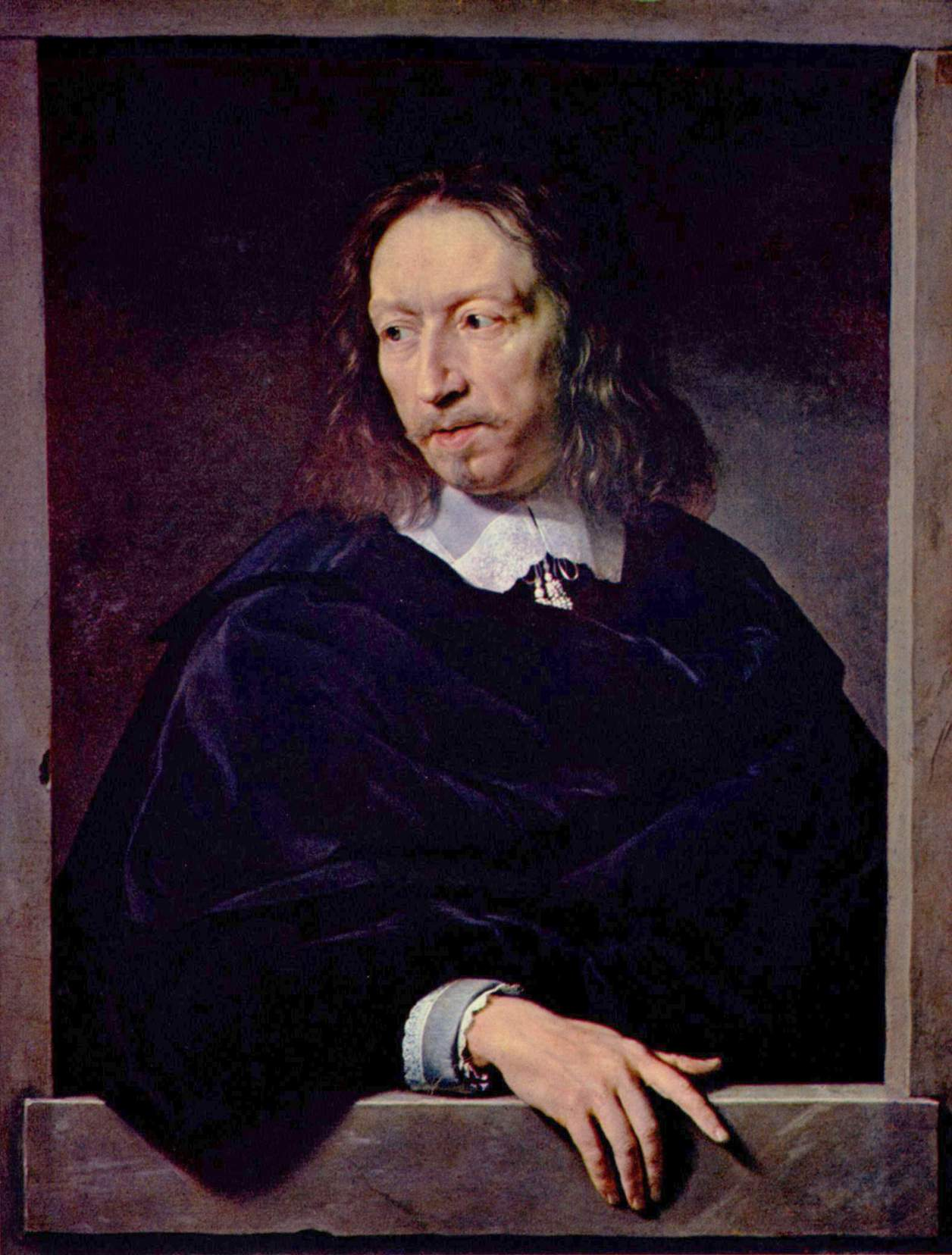
Portrait of Arnauld d'Andilly, 1650, Louvre

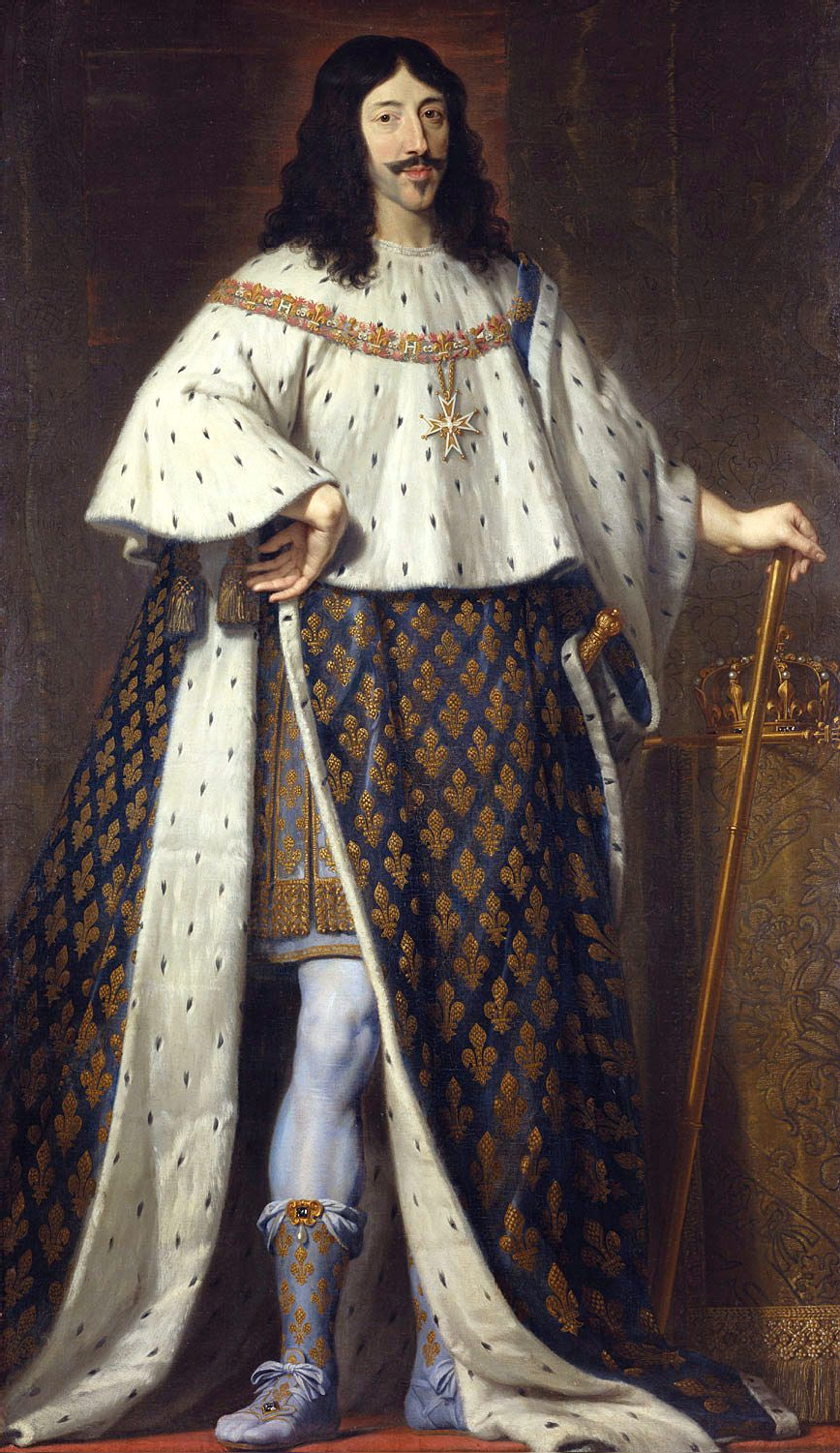
Louis XIII of France in Coronation Robes, c. 1622–1639, Royal Collection

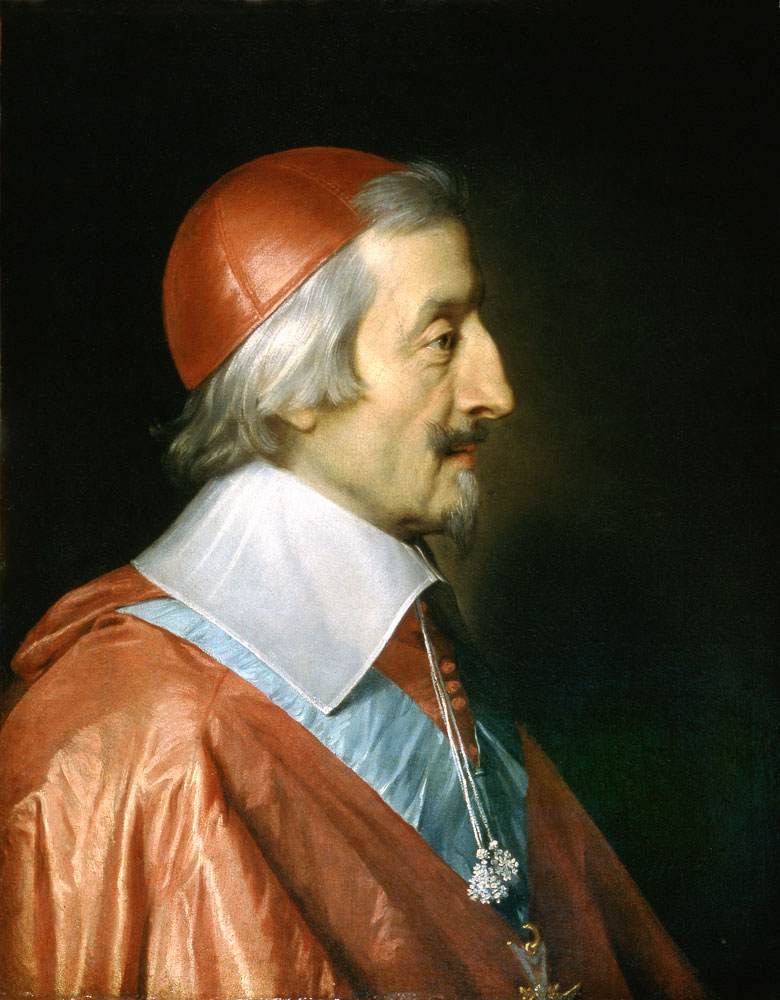
Portrait of Cardinal Richelieu, 1642, Musée des Beaux-Arts de Strasbourg

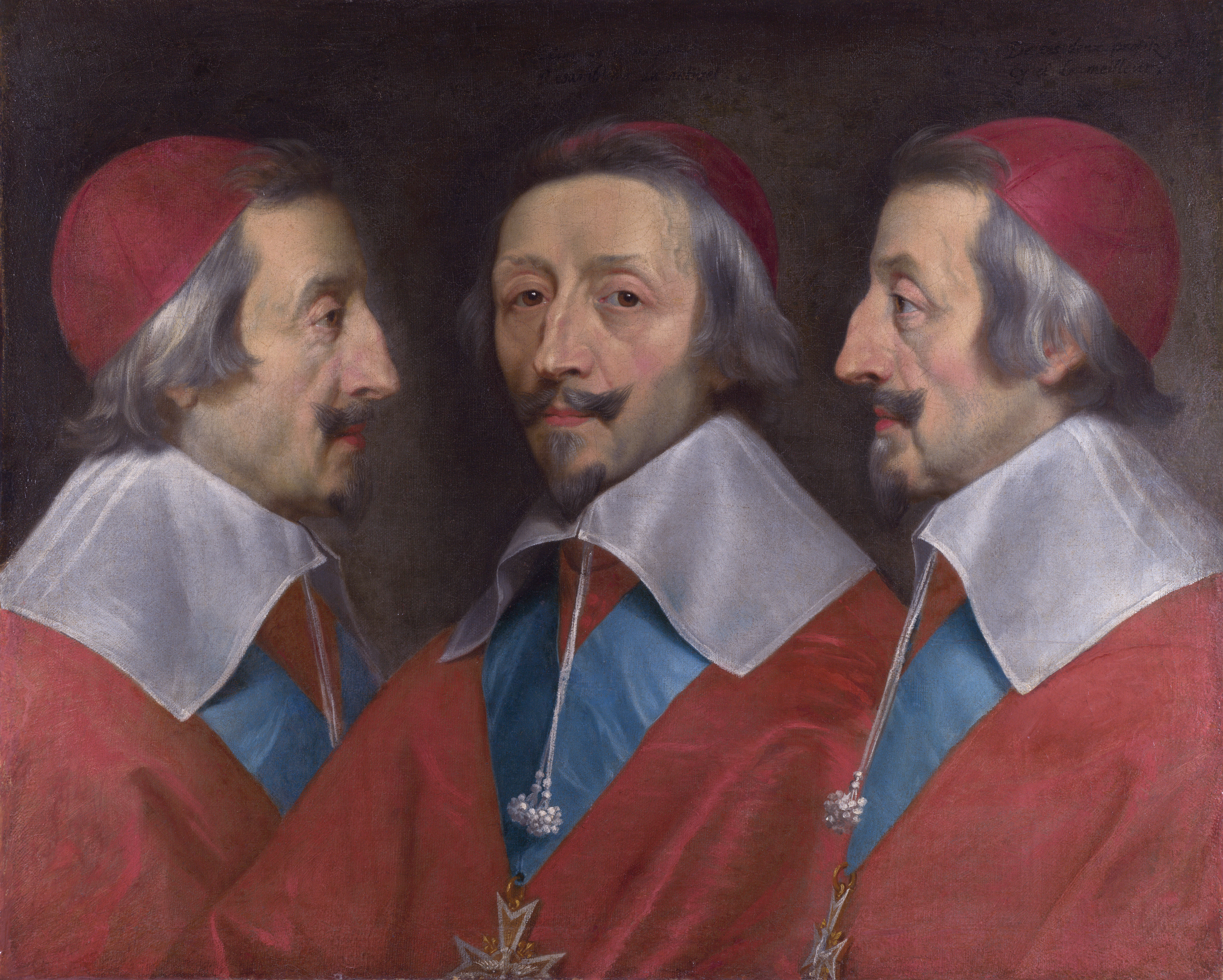
Triple portrait of Cardinal de Richelieu, c. 1642, National Gallery, London

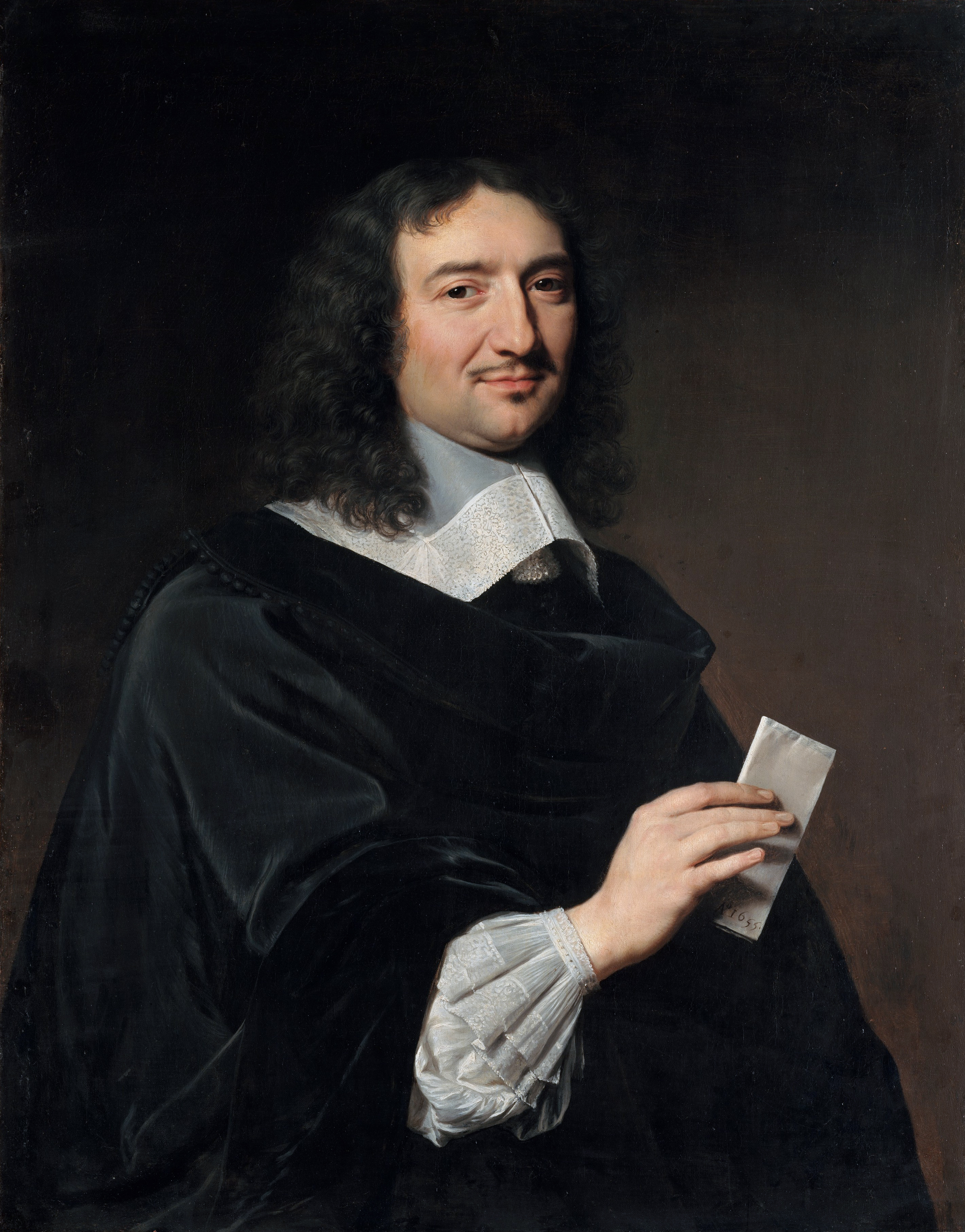
Portrait of Jean-Baptiste Colbert, 1666

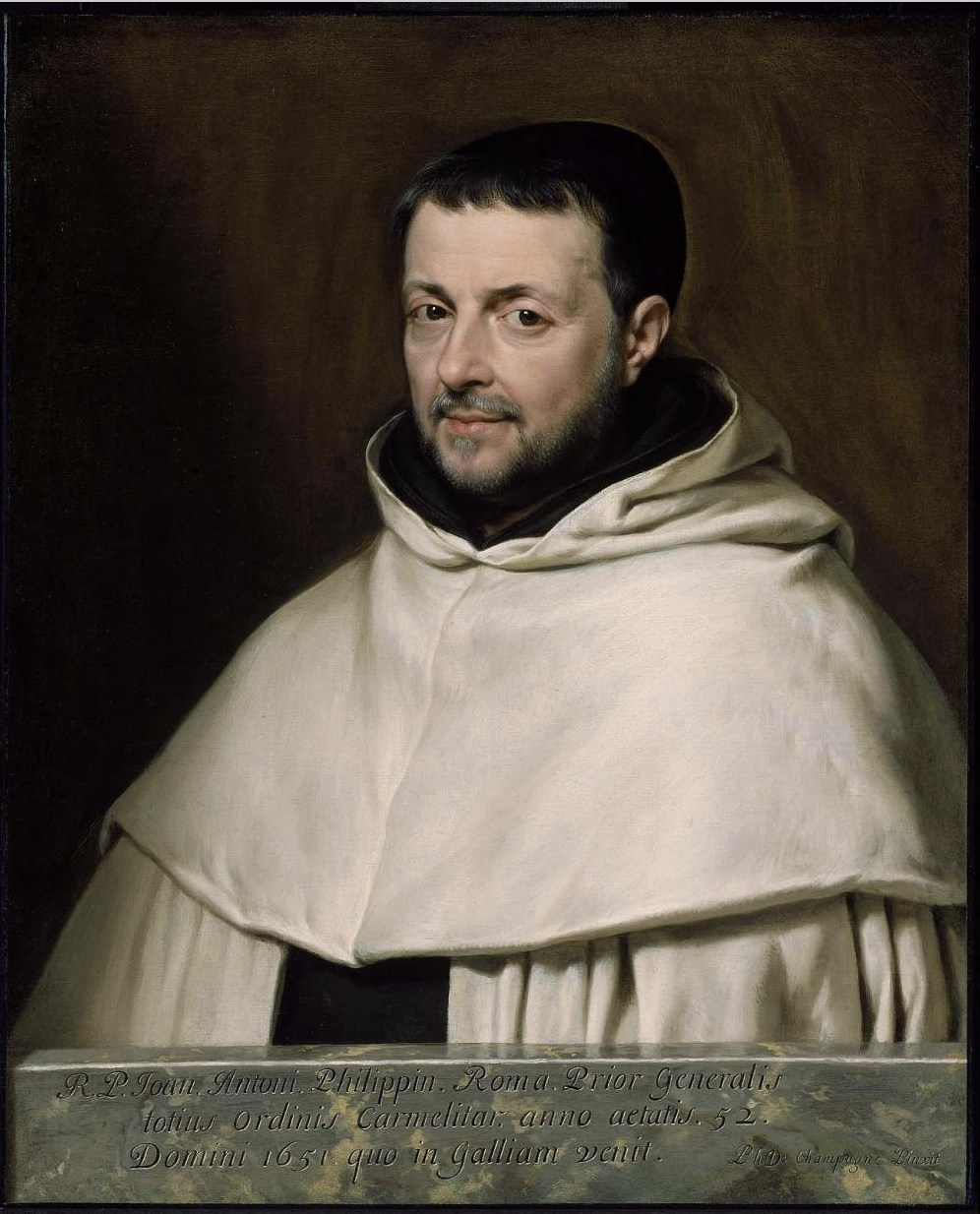
Reverend Father Giovanni Antonio Philippini, 1651, Museum of Fine Arts, Boston (1993.35)

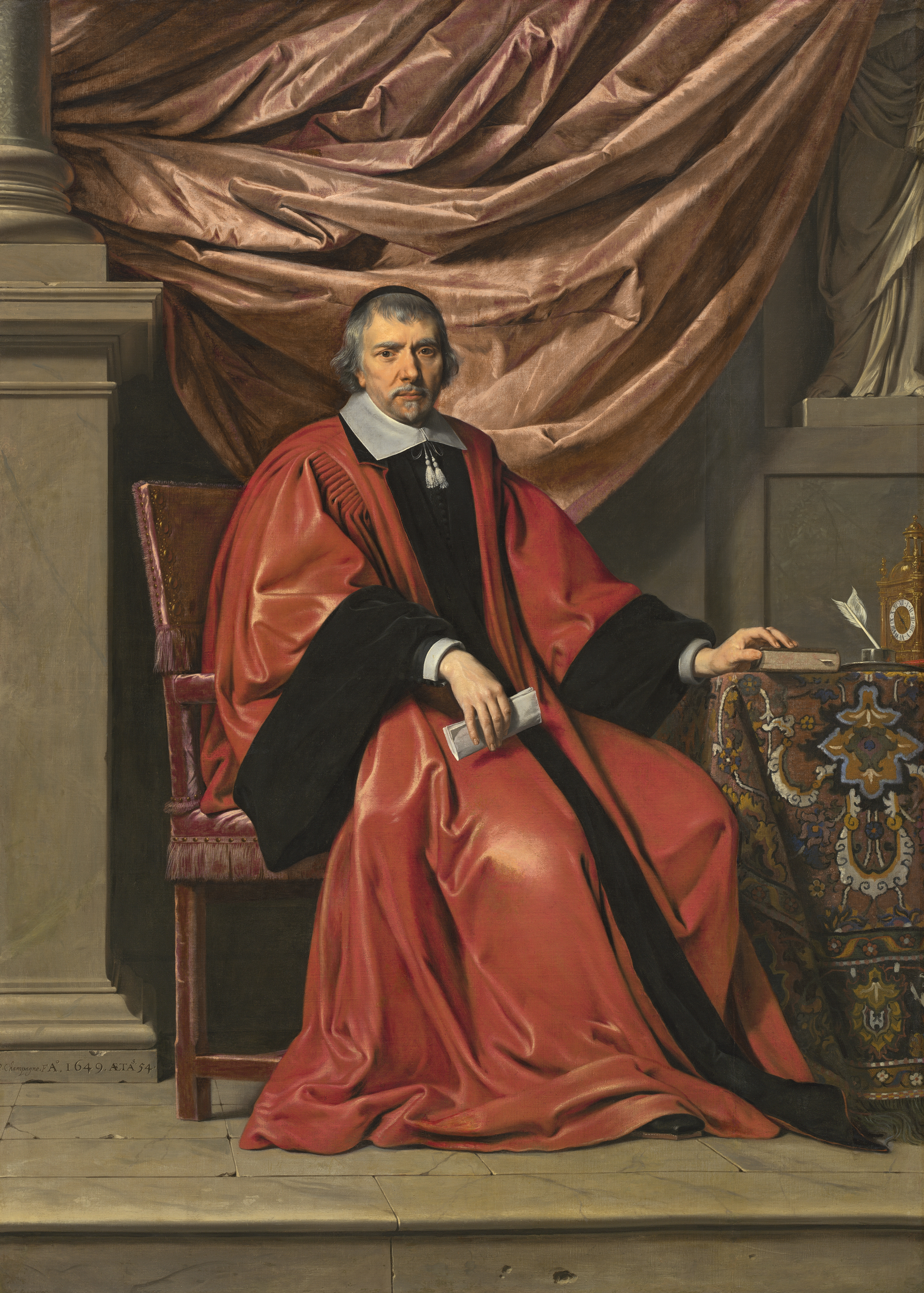
Portrait of Omer Talon, 1649

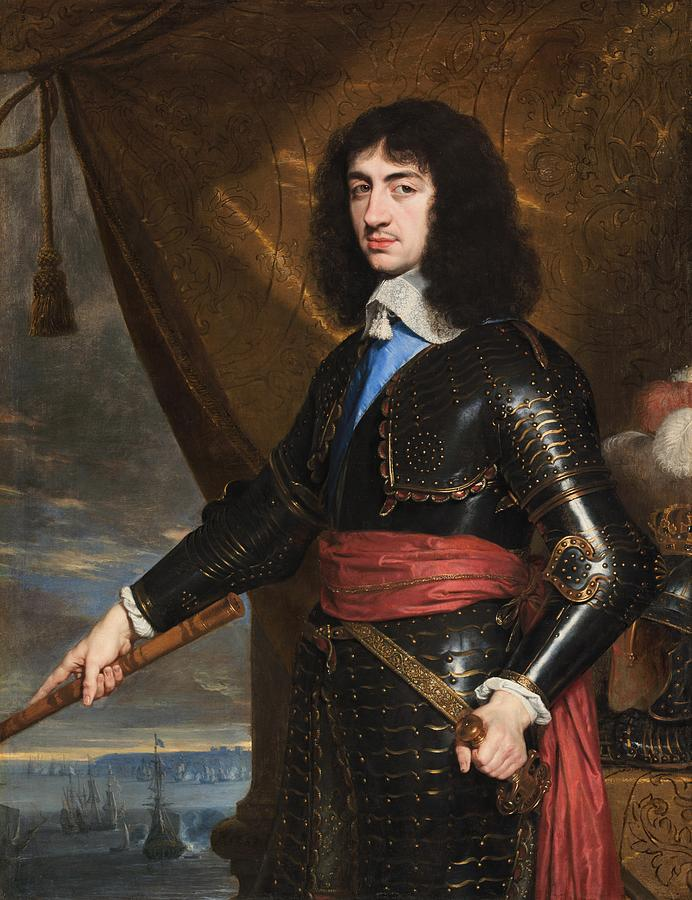
Charles II of England, 1653

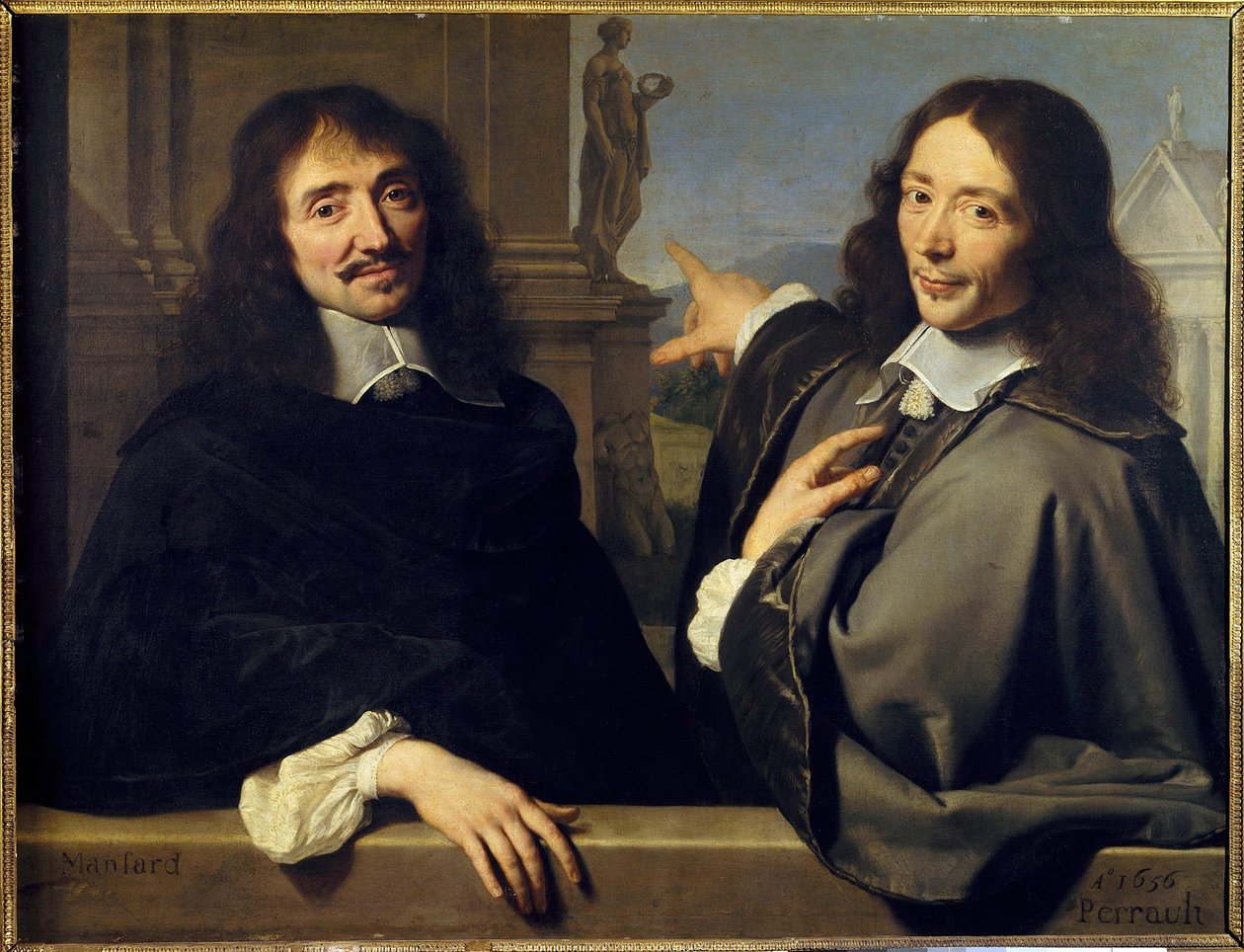
Double portrait of François Mansard and Claude Perrault, 17th century, attributed

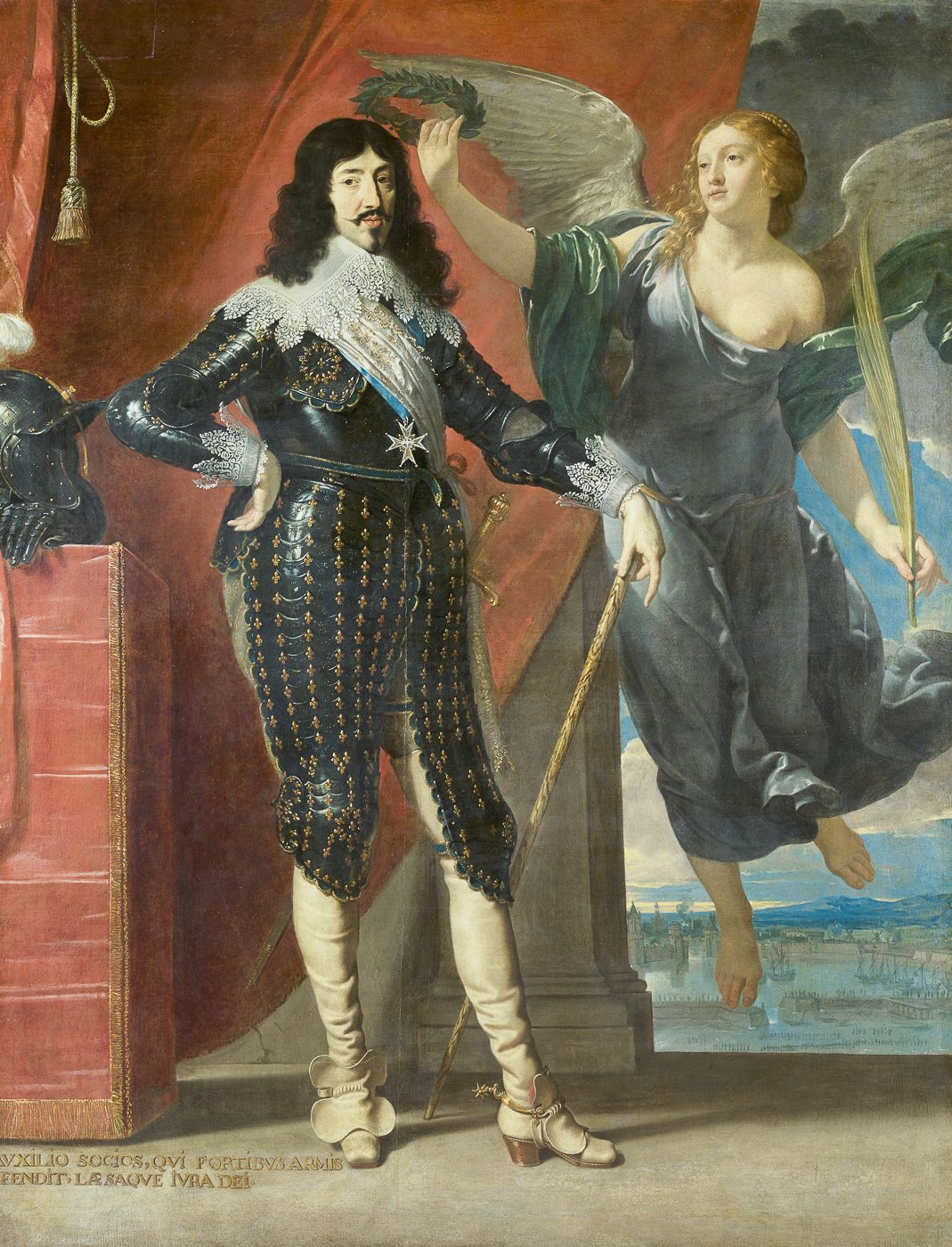
Louis XIII Crowned by Victory, 1635, Louvre

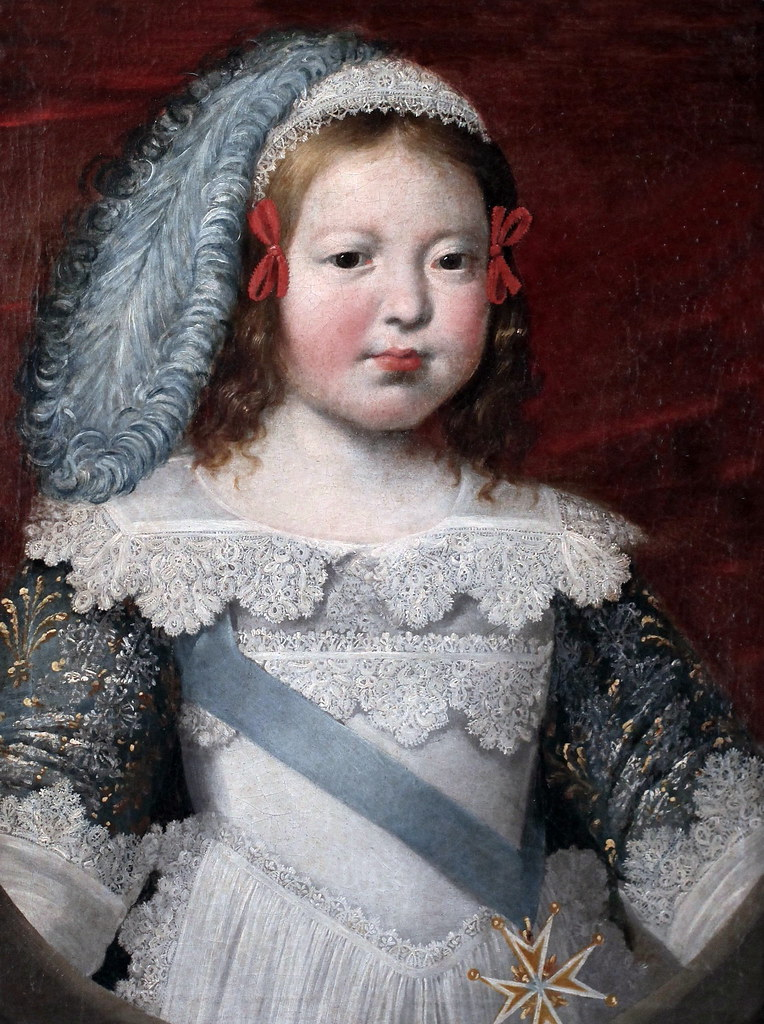
Portrait of Louis XIV, then Dauphin of France, 1642, Musée des Beaux-Arts d'Orléans

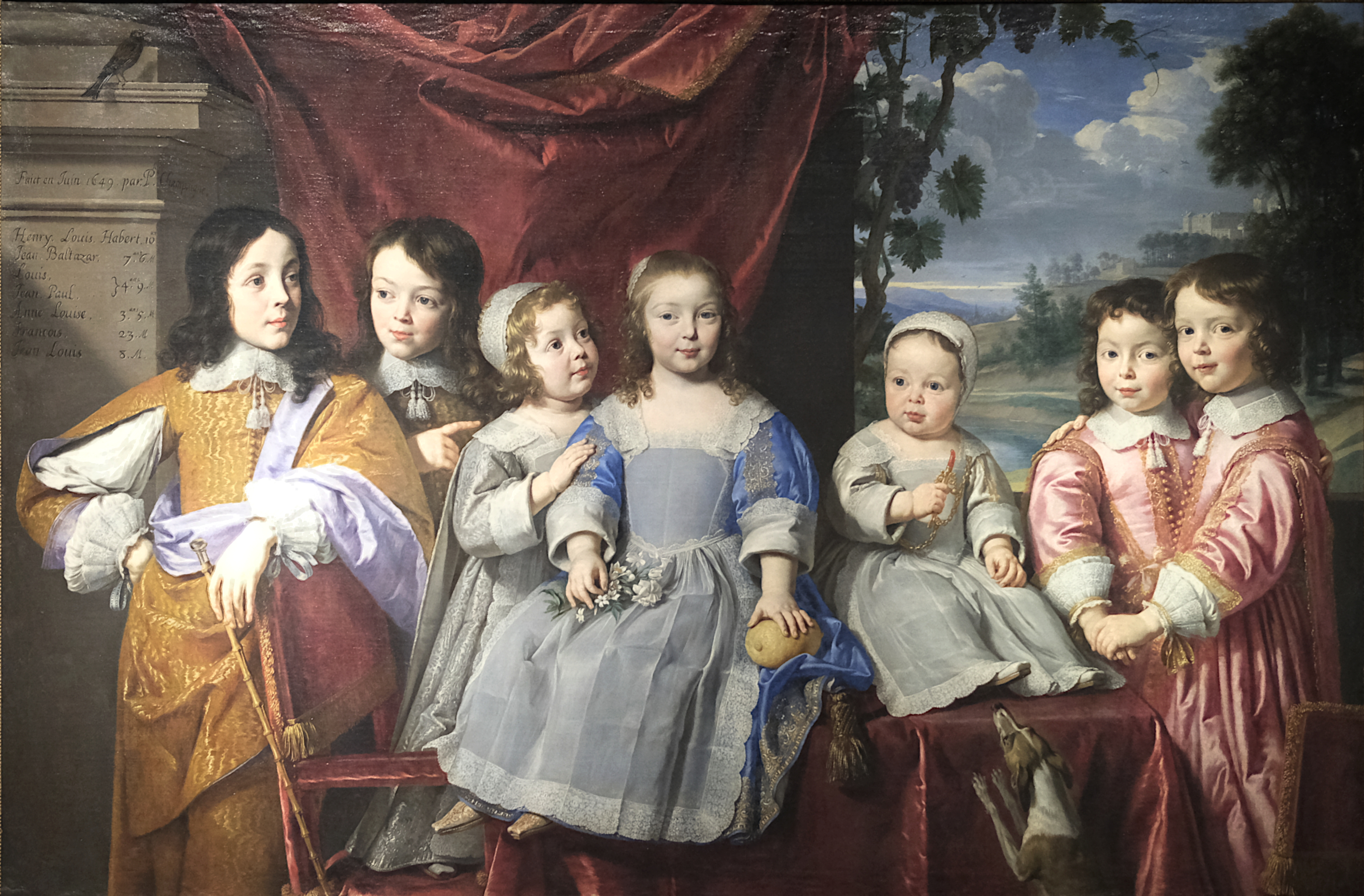
Portrait of the children of Habert de Montmor, 1649, Museum of Fine Arts, Reims
