= Portrait of Cardinal Richelieu =

Portrait of Cardinal Richelieu may refer to any of the following paintings, all by Philippe de Champaigne:

- Portrait of Cardinal Richelieu (Champaigne, London)
- Portrait of Cardinal Richelieu (Champaigne, Paris)
- Portrait of Cardinal Richelieu (Champaigne, Strasbourg)
- Triple Portrait of Cardinal de Richelieu
