= Portrait of Cardinal Richelieu (Champaigne, Paris) =

Painting by Philippe de Champaigne in the Louvre

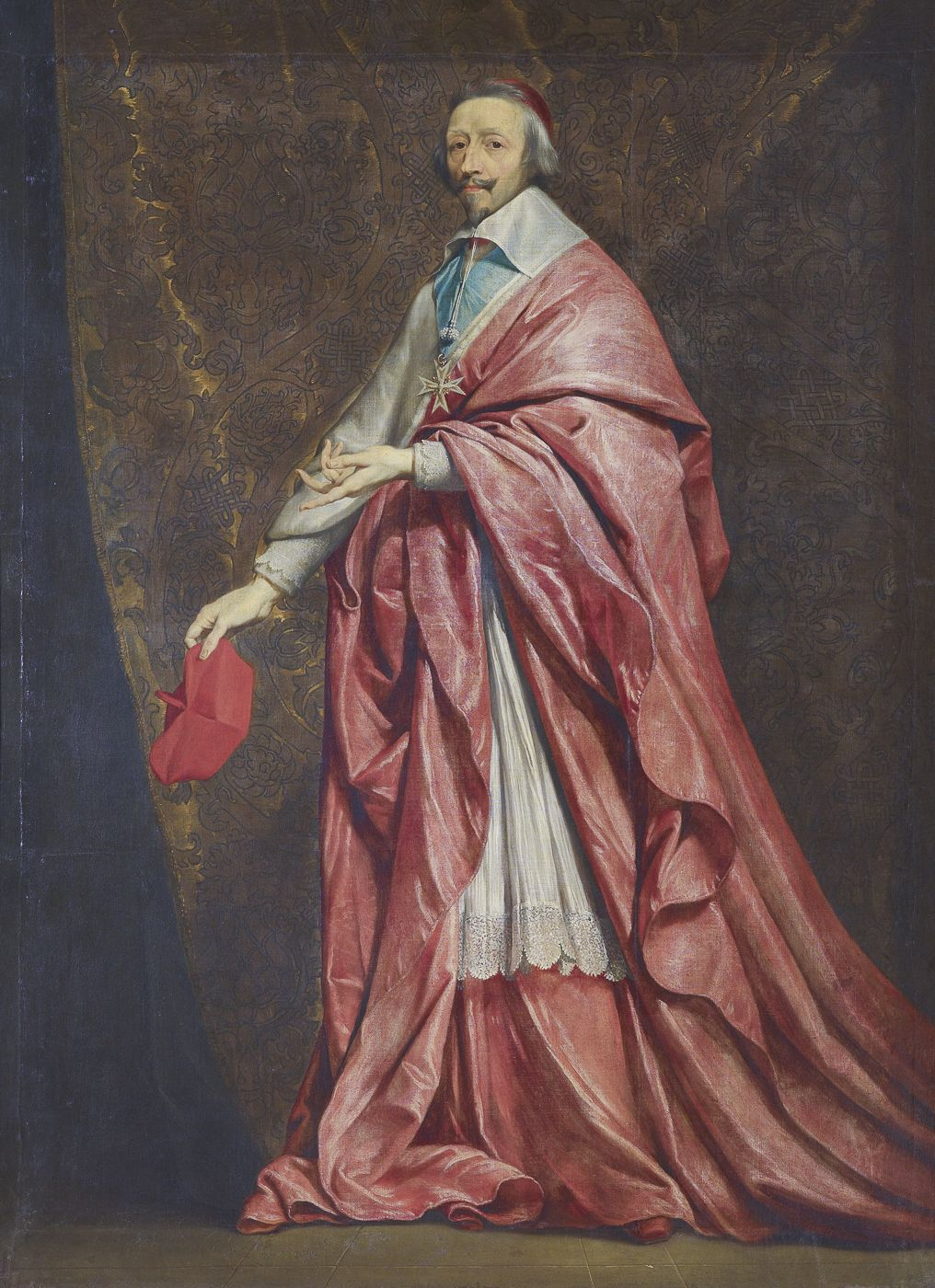
Portrait of Cardinal Richelieu (c. 1635-1640) by Philippe de Champaigne

Portrait of Cardinal Richelieu is an oil on canvas painting by Philippe de Champaigne, from c. 1635-1640. It is one of the 21 portraits he produced of cardinal de Richelieu. Probably originally meant for the hôtel de Toulouse, it passed through the collections of Louis II Phélypeaux de La Vrillière then Louis Jean Marie de Bourbon, Duke of Penthièvre (1725-1793) and was seized with the rest of the latter's collection at the château d'Anet by the republican French state in 1793, before being placed in the Louvre five years later, where it still hangs.

== Bibliography (in French) ==
- Jean Hubac (2018). "Le cardinal de Richelieu : images et pouvoir". histoire-image.org.
