= Memorial to Alessandro Valtrini =

Artwork by Gianlorenzo Bernini

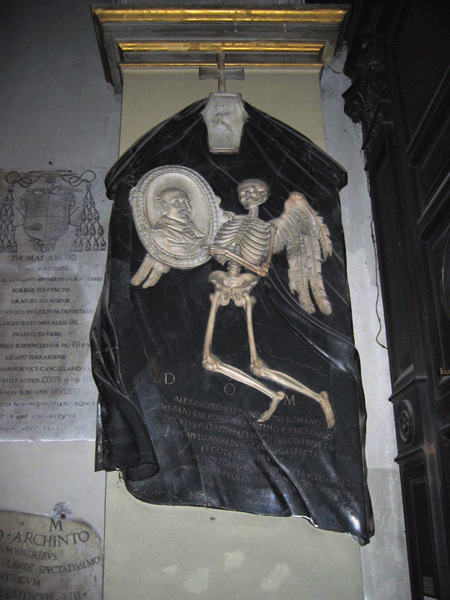
- Artist: Gian Lorenzo Bernini
- Year: 1639
- Catalogue: 43
- Type: Sculpture
- Medium: Marble relief
- Subject: Alessandro Valtrini
- Dimensions: Life-size skeleton
- Location: San Lorenzo in Damaso; Rome
- Preceded by: Bust of Cardinal Richelieu
- Followed by: Memorial to Ippolito Merenda

The Memorial to Alessandro Valtrini is a funerary monument designed by the Italian artist Gian Lorenzo Bernini in 1639, and executed by his workshop in the same year. It is situated in the church of the San Lorenzo in Damaso in Rome. It has strong affinities with the Memorial to Ippolito Merenda; both were undertaken by Bernini's workshop and commissioned by Cardinal Francesco Barberini to commend the ecclesiastical work done by Valtrini and Merenda respectively. In aesthetic terms, both broke new ground in figuring Death as a moving skeleton carrying a flowing inscriptions and, in the case of Alessandro Valrtrini monument, a medallion-shaped portrait of Valtrini himself.

Valtrini had been a wealthy donor during his lifetime. Three churches he had supported erected monuments to him, Il Gesù (where his body remained), Santa Maria sopra Minerva and the Bernini version in San Lorenzo in Damaso. He died in 1633. Francesco Barberini organised the Bernini commission in the late 1630s.

== See also ==
- List of works by Gian Lorenzo Bernini
