= San Giacomo alla Lungara =

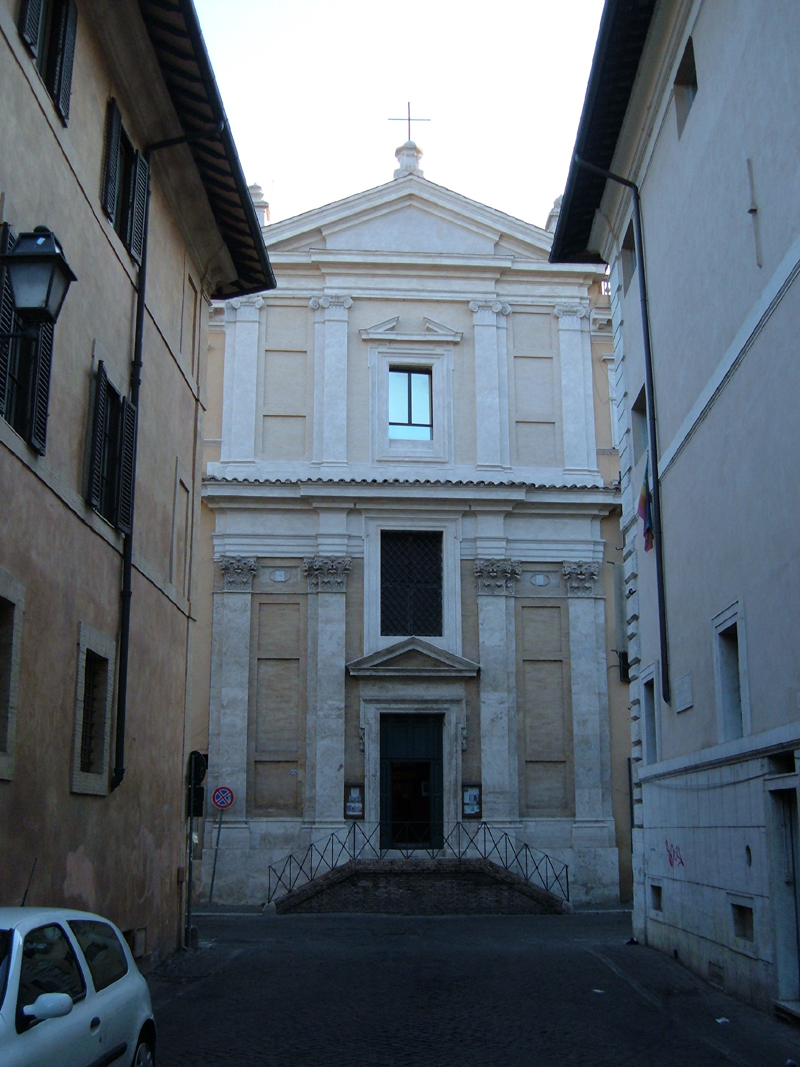
- The façade
- Click on the map for a fullscreen view
- 41°53′42″N 12°27′57″E
- Location: Via della Lungara, Rome
- Country: Italy
- Denomination: Roman Catholic
- Tradition: Latin

History
- Status: Minor basilica
- Consecrated: 1644

Architecture
- Architectural type: Church
- Style: Romanesque, Baroque
- Completed: 1644

Administration
- District: Lazio
- Province: Rome

San Giacomo alla Lungara is a church in Rome (Italy), in the Rione Trastevere, facing on Via della Lungara. It is also called San Giacomo in Settimiano or in Settignano, due to its vicinity to Porta Settimiana, built by Septimius Severus and included by Aurelianus within the city walls.

The church has medieval origins: it probably dates back to the papacy of Leo IV in 9th century. However, the former documents attesting its existence are papal bulls promulgated in 1198 and 1228, when the church was declared a branch of St. Peter's Basilica by Pope Innocent III. In 12th century Pope Innocent IV allowed it to the Sylvestrine Congregation; in 1620 the Vatican Chapter entrusted the church to the Franciscans and then to the Penitent Nuns, which, in 1644, charged Luigi Arrigucci (1575–1644) with the restoration of the building: because of these restorations, the church lost its basilican layout with three naves and became a single nave church with coffering on the ceiling. In the same period the nuns also built the annexed cloister, devoted to the prostitutes wishing to change their life; the cloister was demolished in 1887, during the building of the Lungotevere. In the same period the church, after having suffered 15 years of abandon and risked itself the destruction, was finally renovated.

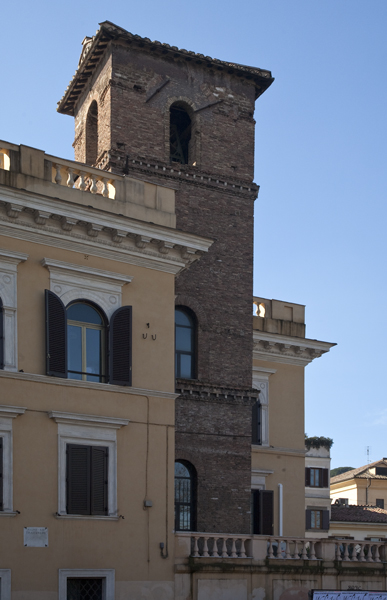
The towerbell

Across the Lungotevere it is possible to see the Romanesque towerbell, dating back to the 12th century and the only surviving Medieval feature. The interior of the church displays a single nave. The most famous work of art is the Memorial to Ippolito Merenda by Gian Lorenzo Bernini: a gravestone with the shape of a puckered sheet, sustained with both hands and teeth by a winged skeleton. The high altar houses a painting by Giovanni Francesco Romanelli portraying James the Apostle.

== Bibliography ==
- Armellini, Mariano (1891). Le chiese di Roma dal secolo IV al XIX. Roma.
- Buchowiecki, Walther; Kuhn-Forte, Brigitte (1997). Handbuch der Kirchen Roms: der römische Sakralbau in Geschichte und Kunst von der altchristlichen Zeit bis zur Gegenwart. Bd 4, Die Kirchen innerhalb der Mauern Roms: S. Teodoro bis Ss. Vito, Modesto e Crescenzia; Die Kirchen von Trastevere. Wien: Hollinek. pp. 497–507. ISBN 3-85119-266-4.
- Carpaneto, Giorgio (2001). "Rione XIII. Trastevere". In Carpaneto, Giorgio; et al. (eds.). La grande guida dei rioni di Roma. Roma: Newton & Compton Editori. pp. 831–923. ISBN 88-8289-388-X.
- Hülsen, Christian (1927). Le chiese di Roma nel Medio Evo. Firenze.
- Rendina, Claudio (2000). Guida insolita ai misteri, ai segreti, alle leggende e alle curiosità delle chiese di Roma. Roma: Newton & Compton Editori. p. 121. ISBN 88-8289-419-3.
