= Medusa (Bernini) =

Sculpture by Gianlorenzo Bernini

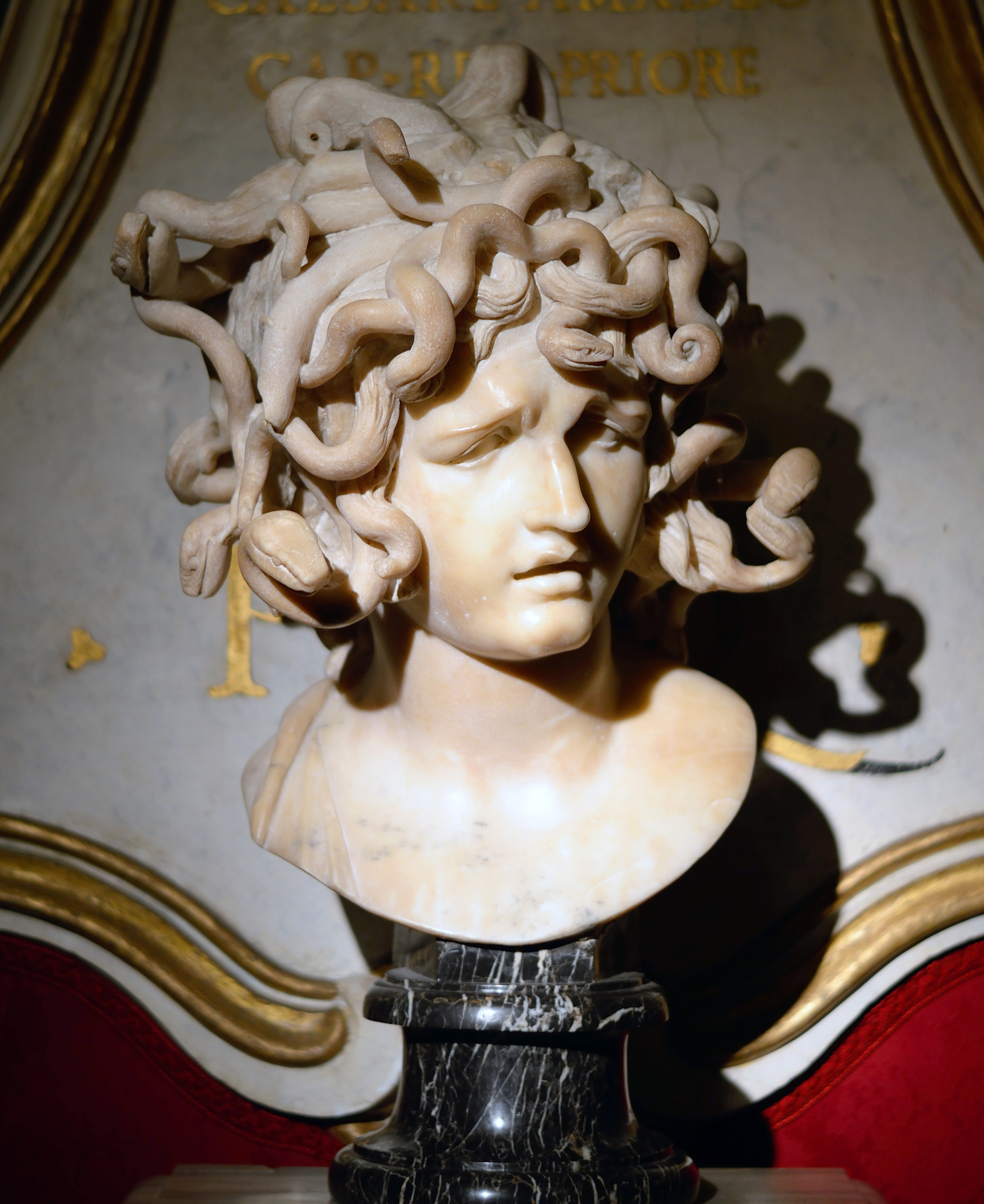
- Artist: Gian Lorenzo Bernini
- Year: c. 1638–1648
- Catalogue: 41
- Type: Sculpture
- Medium: Marble
- Location: Palazzo dei Conservatori, Capitoline Museums, Rome; 41°53′36″N 12°28′59″E
- Preceded by: Bust of Thomas Baker
- Followed by: Bust of Cardinal Richelieu

3D model (click to interact)

Medusa is a marble sculpture of the eponymous character from the classical myth. It was executed by the Italian sculptor Gian Lorenzo Bernini. Its precise date of creation is unknown, but it is likely to have been executed in the 1640s. It was first documented in 1731 when presented to the Palazzo dei Conservatori in Rome, and is now part of the collections of the Capitoline Museums.

== Story ==
The portrait draws on the myth of Medusa, the snake haired woman whose gaze could turn onlookers to stone. Unlike other depictions of the Medusa, such as Benevento Cellini’s Perseus and Medusa, the Medusa is not portrayed as a vanquished figure with her head severed from her body, but as a living monster. Bernini’s decision to create a marble sculpture may be some kind of visual pun on the myth - creating a stone version of a living creature that could turn men to stone.

== Creation ==
Nothing is known about its creation, and parts of the sculpture’s execution undermine Bernini’s authorship of the sculpture, most notable the heavy, exaggerated eyebrows and the rough treatment of the snakes. Yet the sensual fleshy quality of the cheeks and lip, the polished precision of the face, the tormented face of the Medusa and lively intelligence behind the literary concept and its unusual treatment point to the work of Bernini.

== Restoration ==
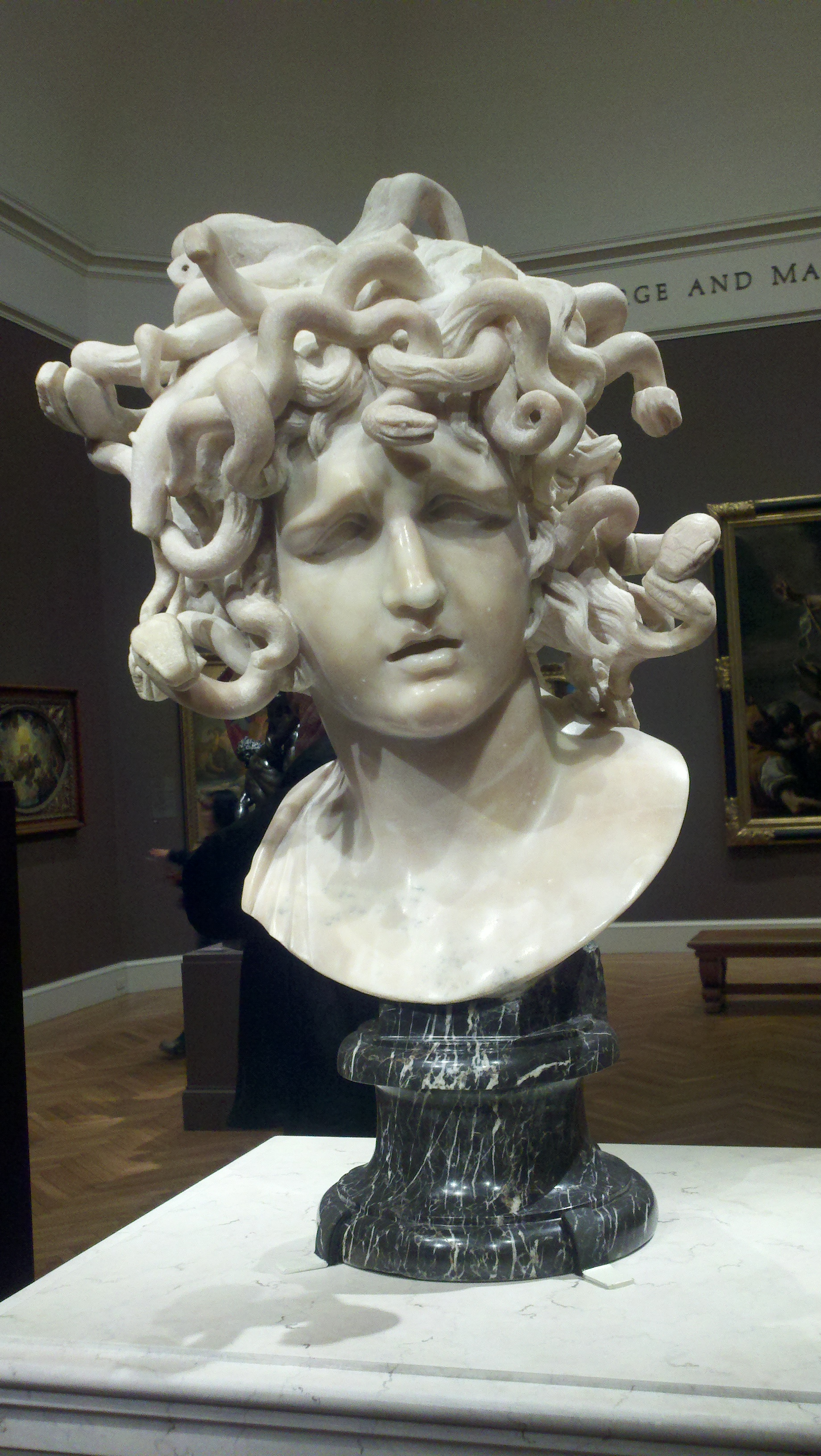
The bust on display in San Francisco after cleaning and restoration

Considerable technical analysis and restoration of the sculpture took place in 2006. The four month long restoration included non-destructive examination of the sculpture using infrared, ultraviolet and laser scanning as well as traditional photography. The techniques used to create the sculpture were analyzed by studying tooling marks and surface finishes. The bust was gradually cleaned and its surface was restored.

== Exhibitions outside Italy ==
Medusa was shown at the Pushkin Museum of Fine Arts in Moscow in May, 2011, as part of the "Year of Italy in Russia". The sculpture was on exhibit in late 2011 and early 2012 at the California Palace of the Legion of Honor in San Francisco. The exhibit was part of the "Dream of Rome", a program displaying art masterpieces from Rome in the United States from 2011 to 2013.

== See also ==
- List of works by Gian Lorenzo Bernini
