= Triple Portrait of Cardinal de Richelieu =

Painting by Philippe de Champaigne

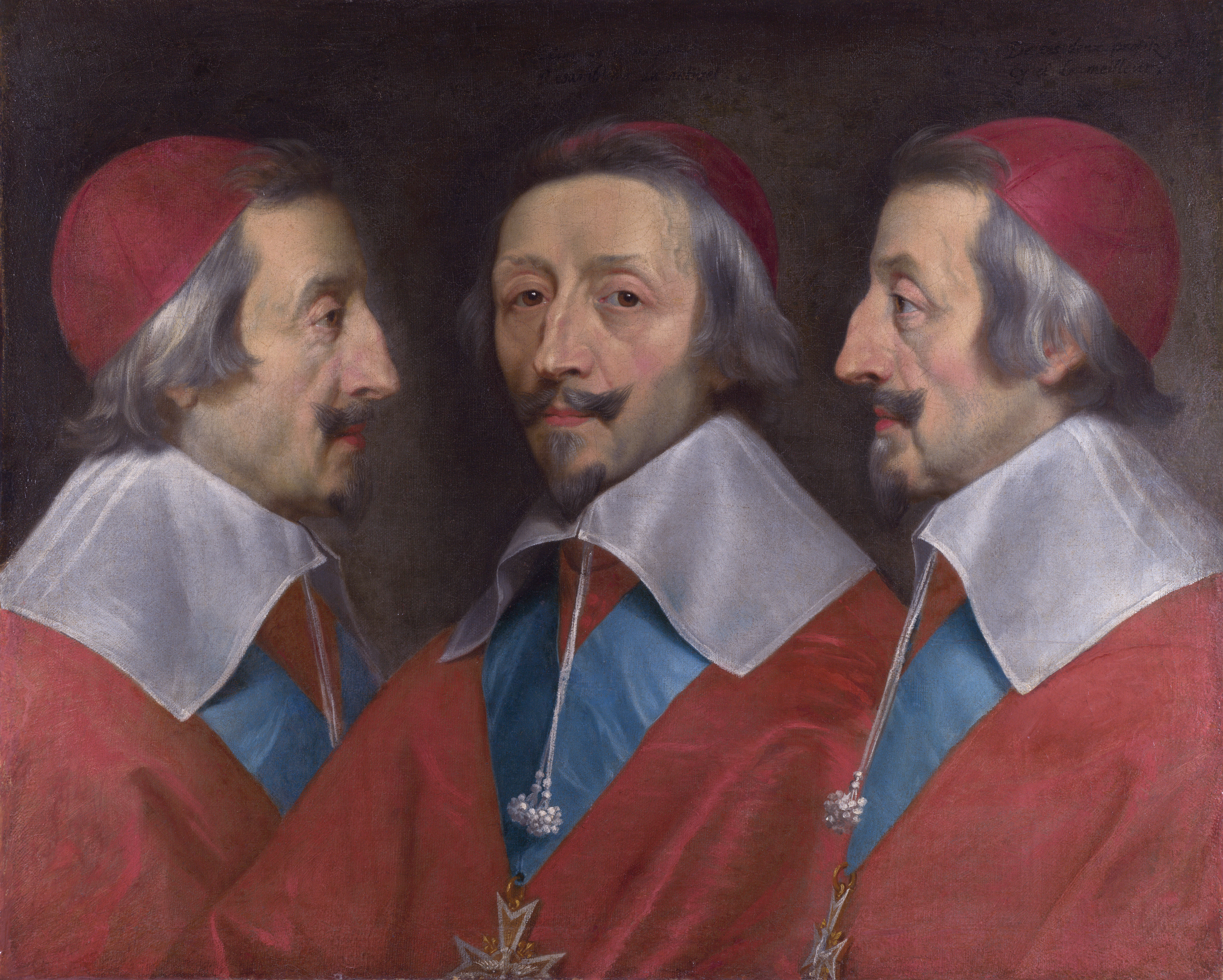
Triple Portrait of Cardinal de Richelieu, Philippe de Champaigne, c. 1642, National Gallery, London

The Triple Portrait of Cardinal de Richelieu is an oil-on-canvas painting by French artist Philippe de Champaigne, completed c. 1642. The portrait shows Cardinal Richelieu from three angles: right profile, face on, and left profile. The painting was made as a study for a bust to be made by an Italian sculptor in Rome. It is now held by the National Gallery, London.

Armand-Jean du Plessis (1585–1642) was of noble birth. He became Bishop of Luçon in 1607 aged just 22 and became a cardinal in 1622. He was the chief minister of King Louis XIII from 1624, and he was created duc de Richelieu in 1629. Phillipe de Champaigne was a leading French artist and was a founding member of the Académie de peinture et de sculpture in 1648. Richelieu was a considerable patron of the arts, and Champaigne painted him many times.

The grey-haired cardinal, aged nearly 60, wears a scarlet liturgical skullcap and cape (possibly a zucchetto and mozzetta). Under the broad collar of a white shirt, tied at the neck with a trailing string, he wears the characteristic blue ribbon of the Order of the Holy Spirit (the origin of the term "cordon bleu") from which hangs the Maltese cross of the Order as a pectoral cross. An inscription above the right head (left profile) notes, "de ces deux profils, cecy [sic] est le meilleur" (French for "of these two profiles, this is the better").

The painting measures 58.7 × 72.8 centimetres (23.1 × 28.7 in). It was made in Paris by Champaigne's workshop after his now dismembered Portrait of Cardinal Richelieu (from which only the right profile is left) as a study to be sent to Rome, where the Italian sculptor Francesco Mochi had been commissioned to make a statue (now lost) for the Château de La Meilleraye near Beaulieu-sous-Parthenay in Poitou. It is likely that the painting was also used by Bernini for his 1641 Bust of Cardinal Richelieu, now in the Louvre Museum. Bernini had adopted a similar method for his 1636 Bust of King Charles I, using a triple portrait by Anthony van Dyck, and it is possible that Van Dyck's triple portrait of Charles I influenced Philippe de Champaigne's triple portrait of Cardinal Richelieu.

The painting was donated to the National Gallery, London in 1869 by the English antiquary and museum administrator Sir Augustus Wollaston Franks.

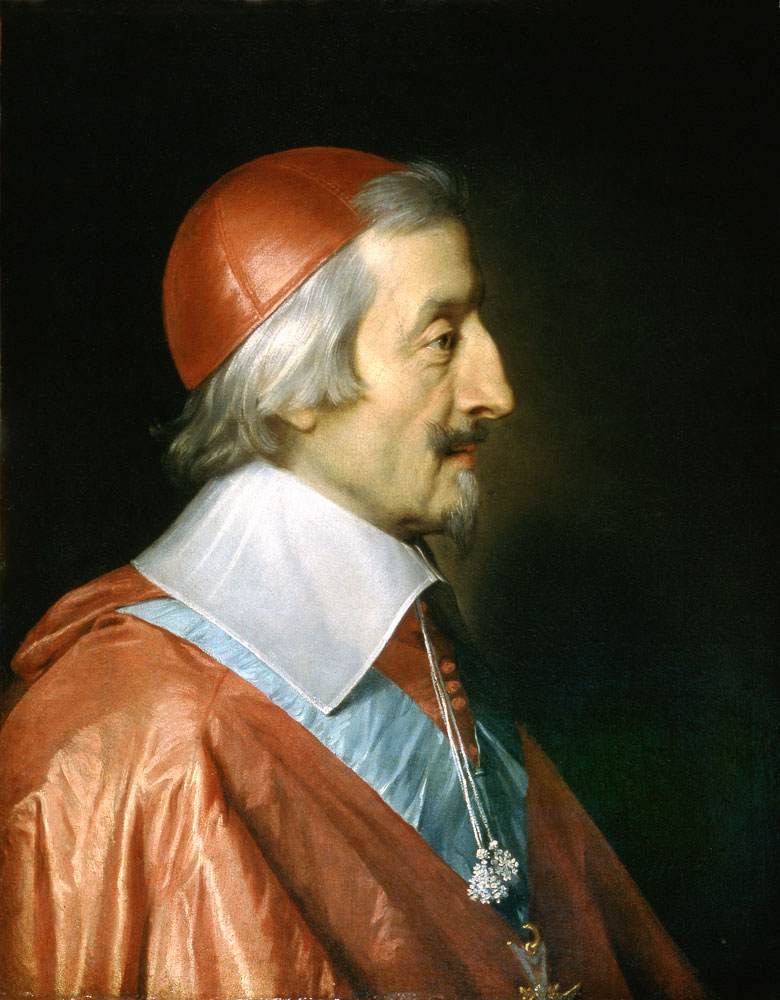
The incomplete original version: Portrait of Cardinal Richelieu, Musée des Beaux-Arts de Strasbourg

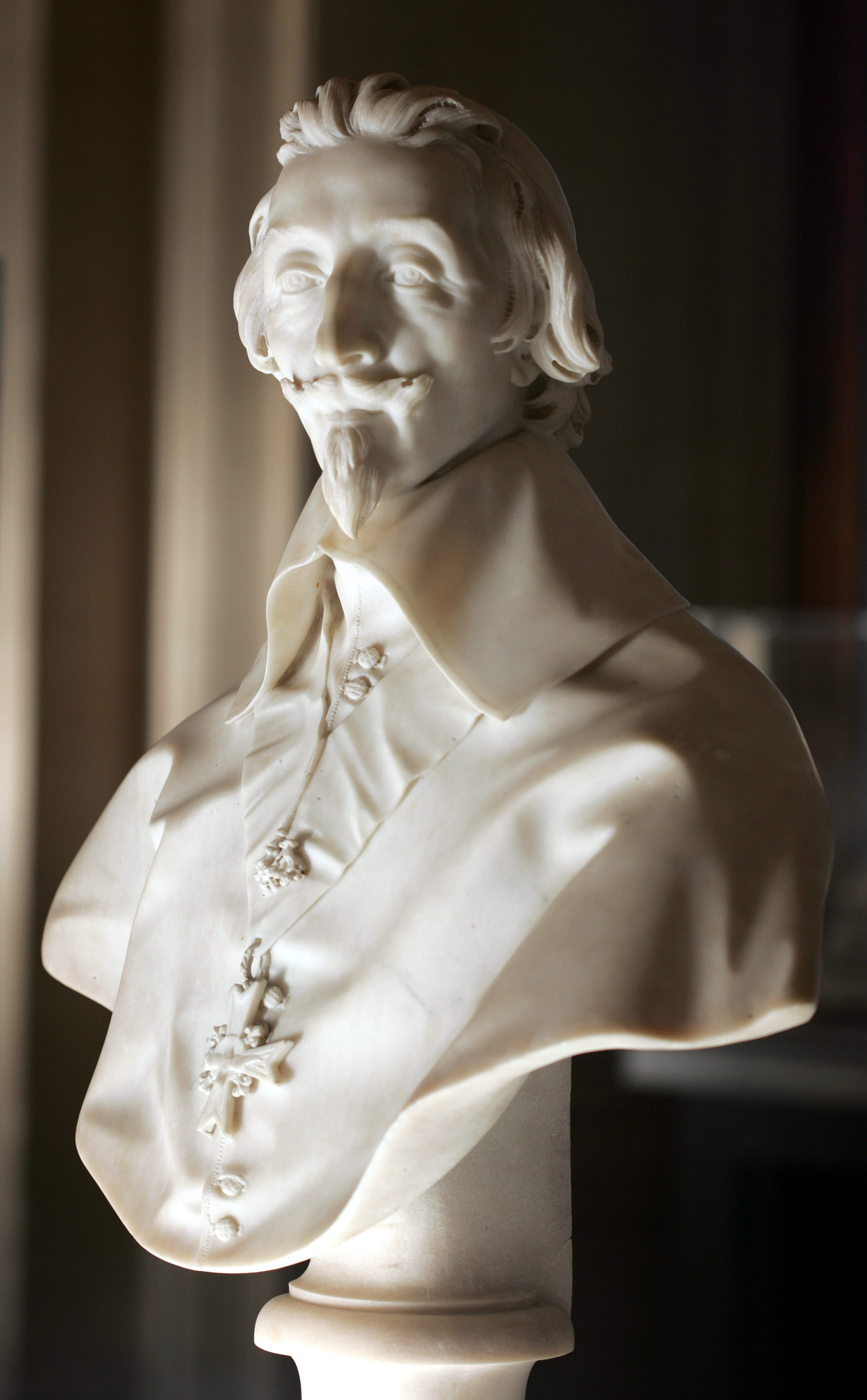
Bust of Cardinal Richelieu, Bernini, 1641, Louvre

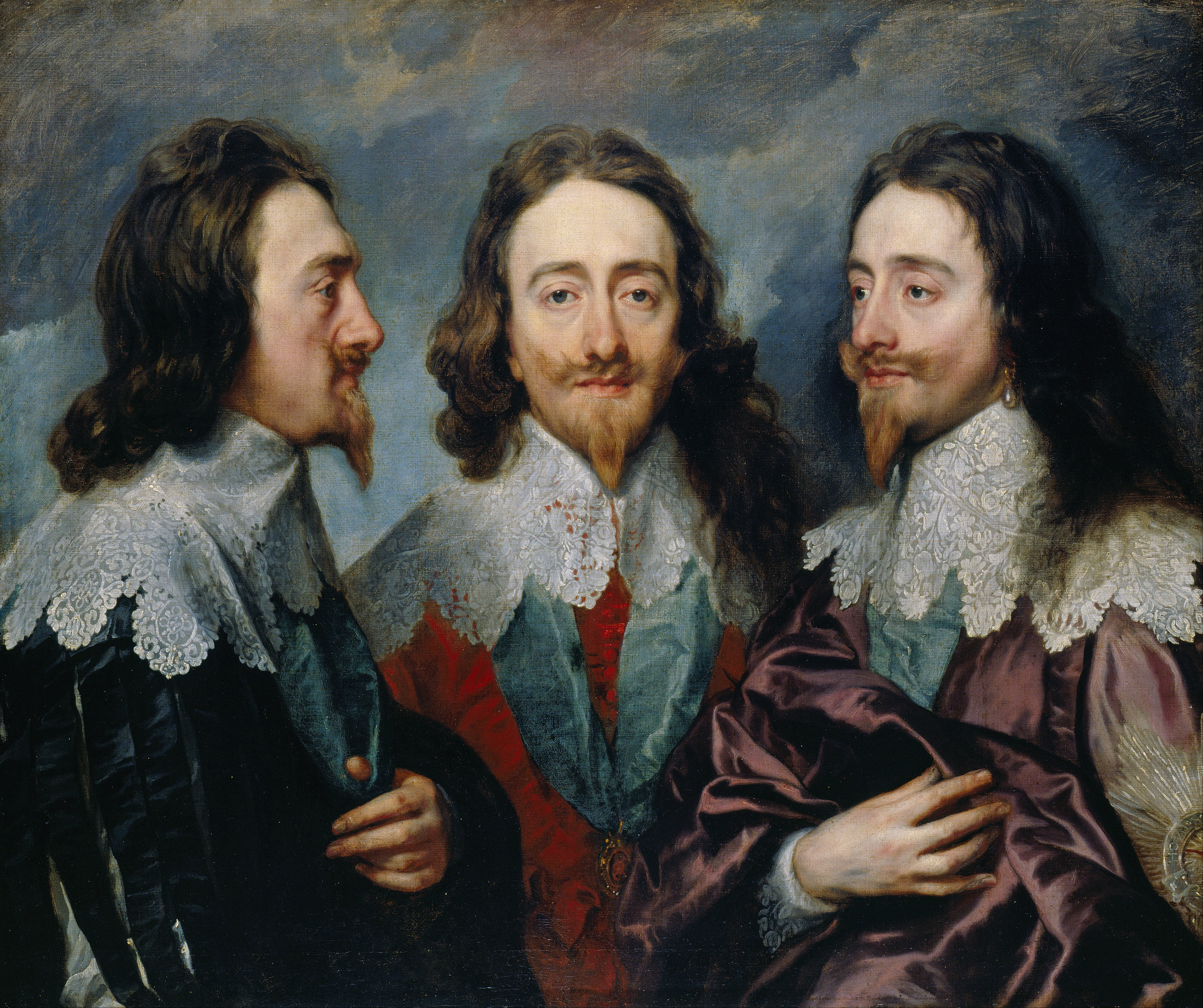
Charles I in Three Positions, also known as the Triple portrait of Charles I, Van Dyck, 1635 or 1636, Royal Collection
