= Portrait of Cardinal Richelieu (Champaigne, London) =

Painting by Philippe de Champaigne

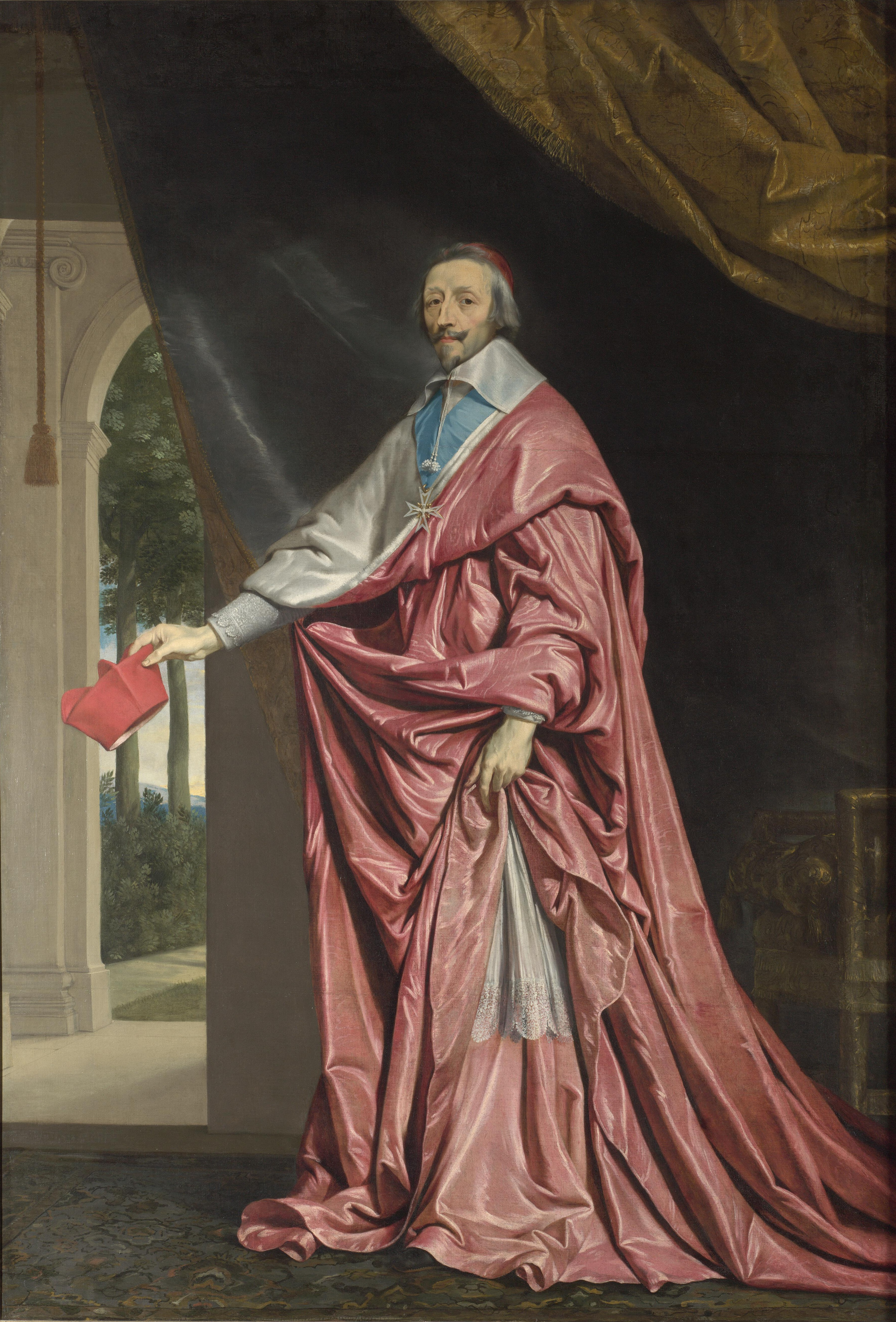
Portrait of Cardinal Richelieu (1633–1640) by Philippe de Champaigne

Portrait of Cardinal Richelieu is one of 21 surviving oil on canvas portraits of Cardinal Richelieu by the French painter Philippe de Champaigne. Produced in 1633–1640, it is now in the National Gallery, in London, to which it was presented by Charles Butler in 1895.
