= Memorial to Ippolito Merenda =

Artwork by Gianlorenzo Bernini

- Artist: Gian Lorenzo Bernini
- Year: 1636–1638
- Catalogue: 43
- Type: Sculpture
- Medium: Marble relief
- Subject: Ippolito Merenda
- Dimensions: Life-size skeleton
- Location: San Giacomo alla Lungara; Rome
- Preceded by: Memorial to Alessandro Valtrini
- Followed by: Memorial to Maria Raggi

The Memorial to Ippolito Merenda is a funerary monument designed by the Italian artist Gian Lorenzo Bernini between 1636 and 1638. Along with the similar monument for Alessandro Valtrini, this artwork was a startling new approach to funerary monuments, incorporating dynamic, flowing inscriptions being dragged by a moving figure of death. It is in the church of San Giacomo alla Lungara in Rome.

Merenda was from Cesena in Emilia Romagna. He left a bequest to San Giacomo della Lungara (of 20,000 Roman scudi) on his death in 1636. One of the nephews of the then pope Urban VIII, Cardinal Francesco Barberini, then commissioned the monument from Bernini in recognition of Merenda's contribution.

== See also ==
- List of works by Gian Lorenzo Bernini
