= Portrait of Cardinal Richelieu (Champaigne, Strasbourg) =

Painting by Philippe de Champaigne

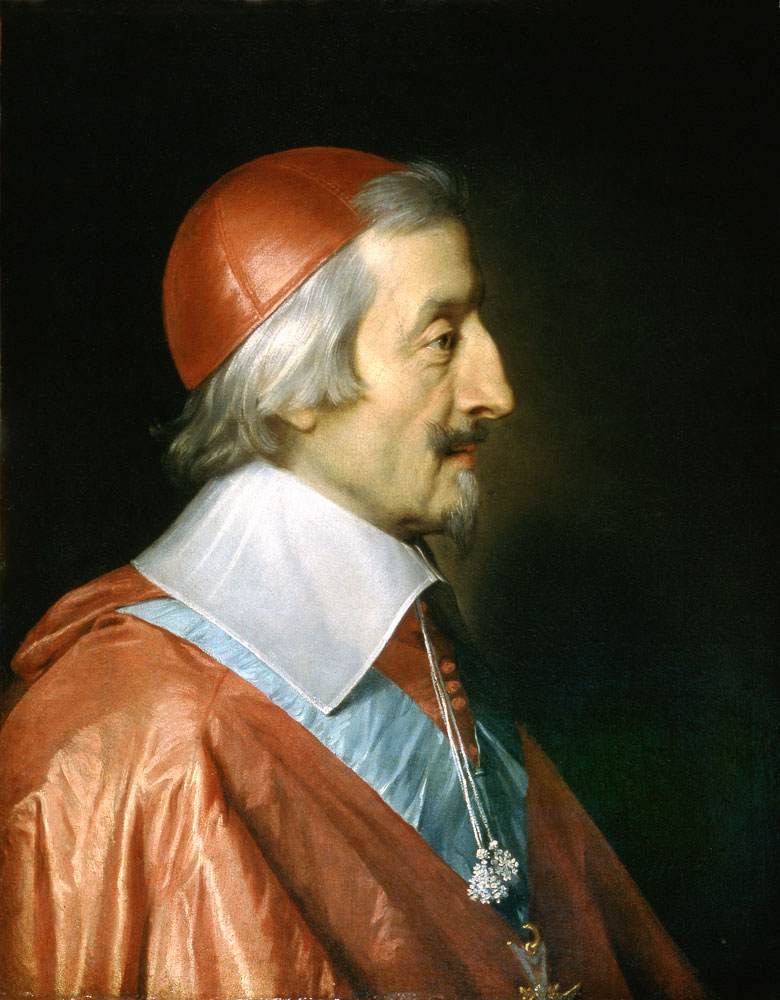
- Artist: Philippe de Champaigne
- Completion date: 1642
- Medium: oil painting on canvas
- Movement: Portrait painting Baroque painting
- Subject: Cardinal Richelieu
- Dimensions: 59 cm × 46 cm (23 in × 18 in)
- Location: Musée des Beaux-Arts, Strasbourg
- Accession: 1987

Portrait of Cardinal Richelieu is a portrait painting of Cardinal Richelieu by the Flemish-born French painter Philippe de Champaigne, Richelieu's favourite portraitist. It was painted a few months before the cardinal's death, in 1642, and is now in the Musée des Beaux-Arts of Strasbourg, France. Its inventory number is 987–2–1.

The painting originally consisted of at least two portraits of Richelieu: right profile and frontal. The frontal portrait was cut off at some point and lost; X-ray examinations of the painting have revealed that it has once existed and that the remaining trace has been concealed by an added border. Conversely, it is not established if a left profile portrait on the same canvas had once existed as well. The Strasbourg version (as a double or maybe triple portrait) then served as the basis for the Triple Portrait of Cardinal de Richelieu, which was mostly painted by Champaigne's workshop, and is considered artistically inferior. The Triple Portrait was in turn used as a model for a bust.
