= Bust of Cardinal Richelieu =

Sculpture by Gian Lorenzo Bernini

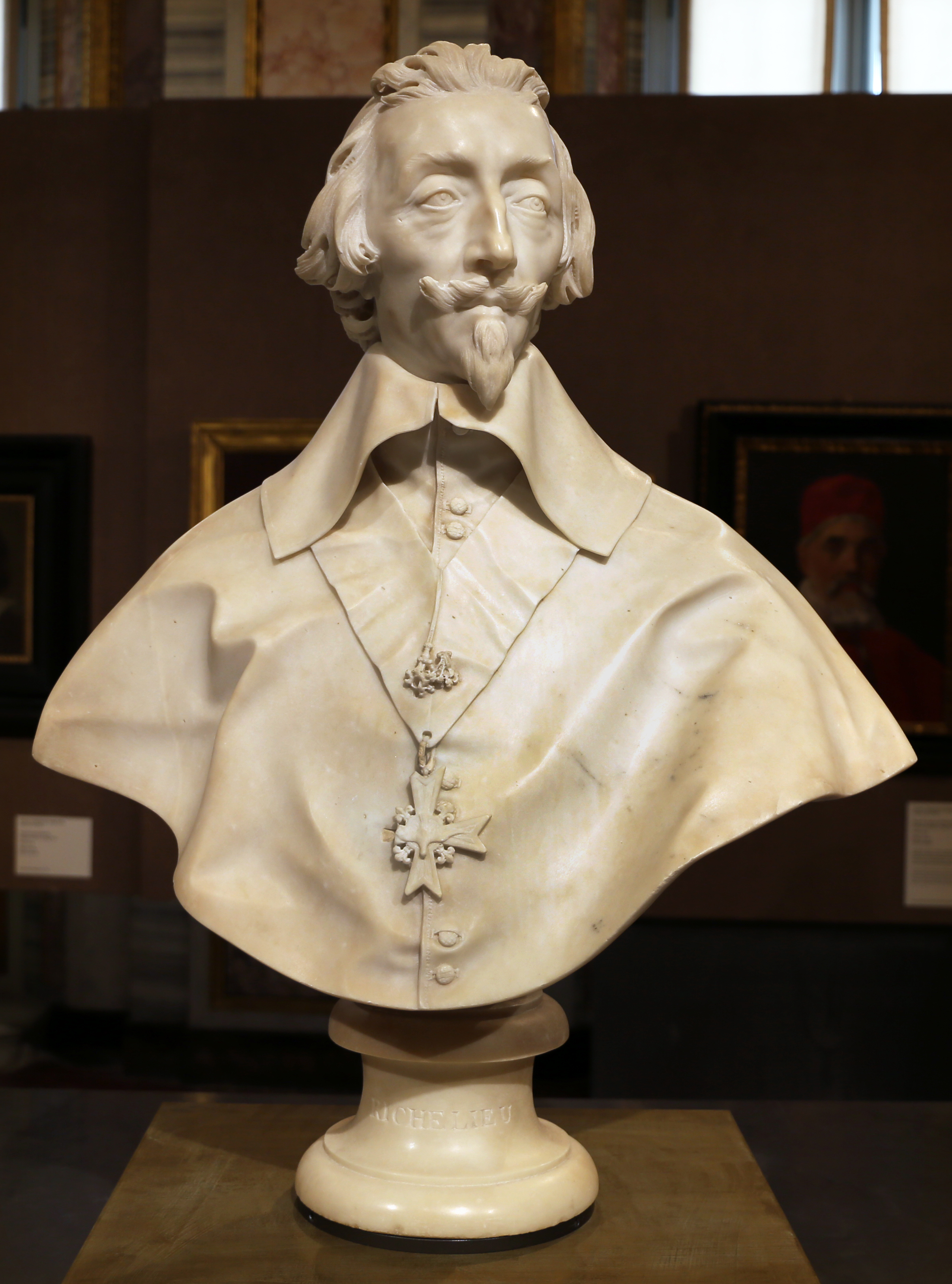
- Artist: Gian Lorenzo Bernini
- Year: 1640–1641
- Catalogue: 42
- Type: Sculpture
- Medium: Marble
- Subject: Cardinal Richelieu
- Location: The Louvre; Paris
- Preceded by: Medusa (Bernini)
- Followed by: Memorial to Alessandro Valtrini

The Bust of Cardinal Richelieu is a marble sculpture by the Italian sculptor Gian Lorenzo Bernini, situated at the Louvre in Paris.

Richelieu had hoped to commission Bernini to make a full-length sculpture, through his friend Jules Mazarin and the French ambassador in Rome François Annibal d'Estrées, but Pope Urban VIII would not permit it, so the sculpture became a bust, sculpted by Bernini between November 1640 and January 1641. He worked from images of Cardinal Richelieu that had been sent to Rome from France.

Once completed, the bust was transported to Paris.

The bust arrived in Paris in August 1640, but Richelieu was not happy with the work, quickly commissioning another bust by Jean Warin.

== Gallery ==
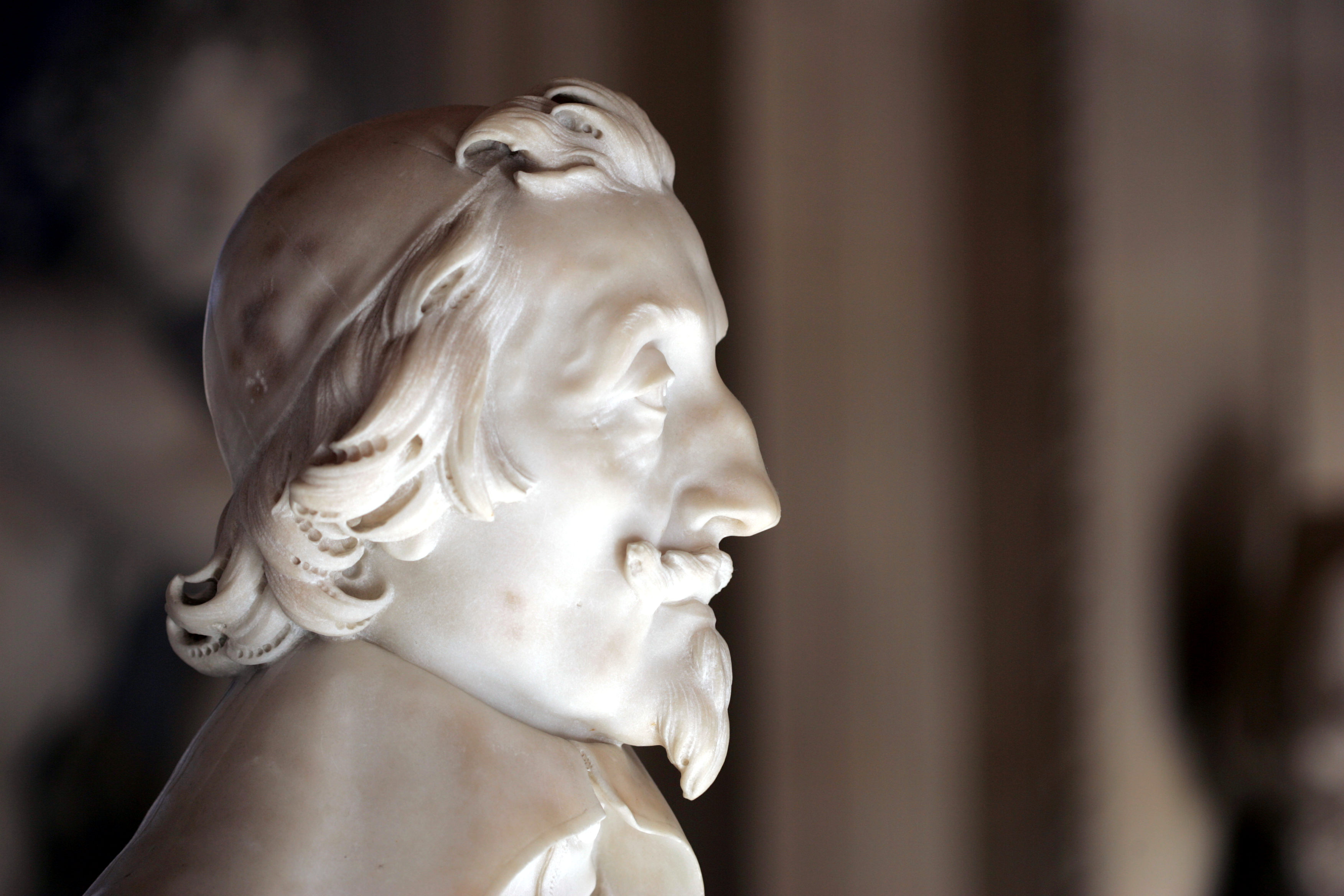

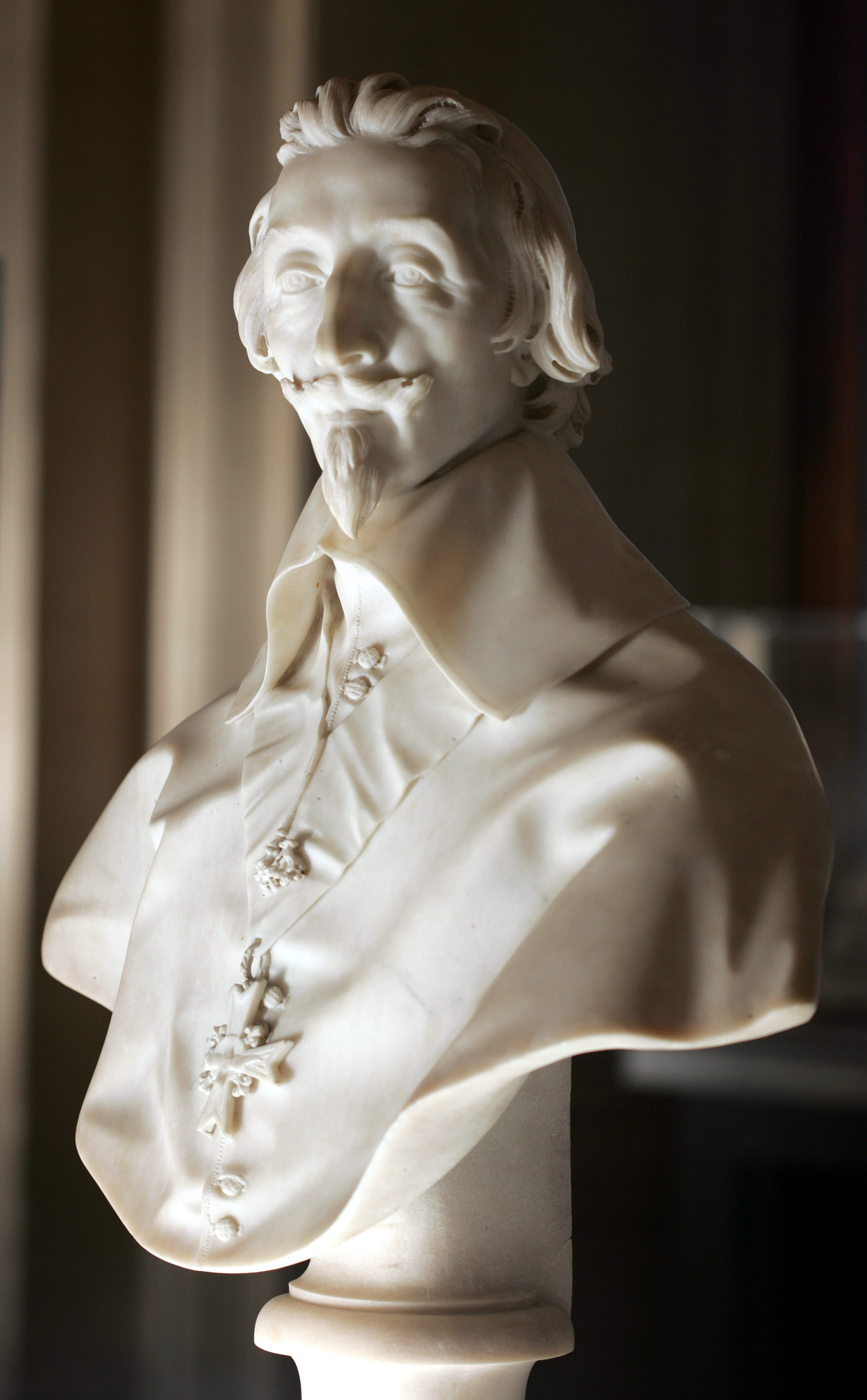

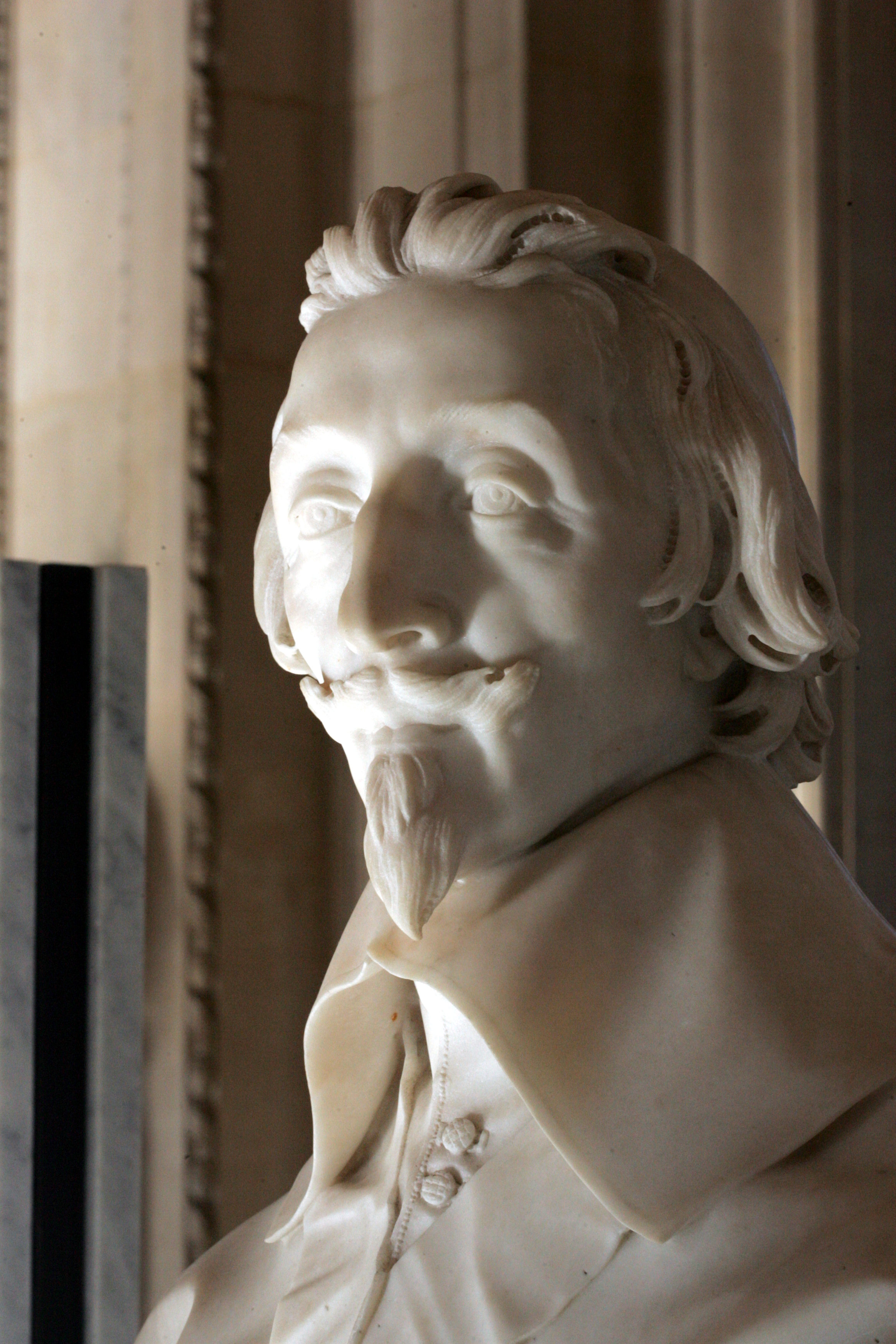

== See also ==
- List of works by Gian Lorenzo Bernini
