= Cardinal Richelieu =

French statesman and clergyman (1585–1642)

His Grand Eminence The Duke of Richelieu
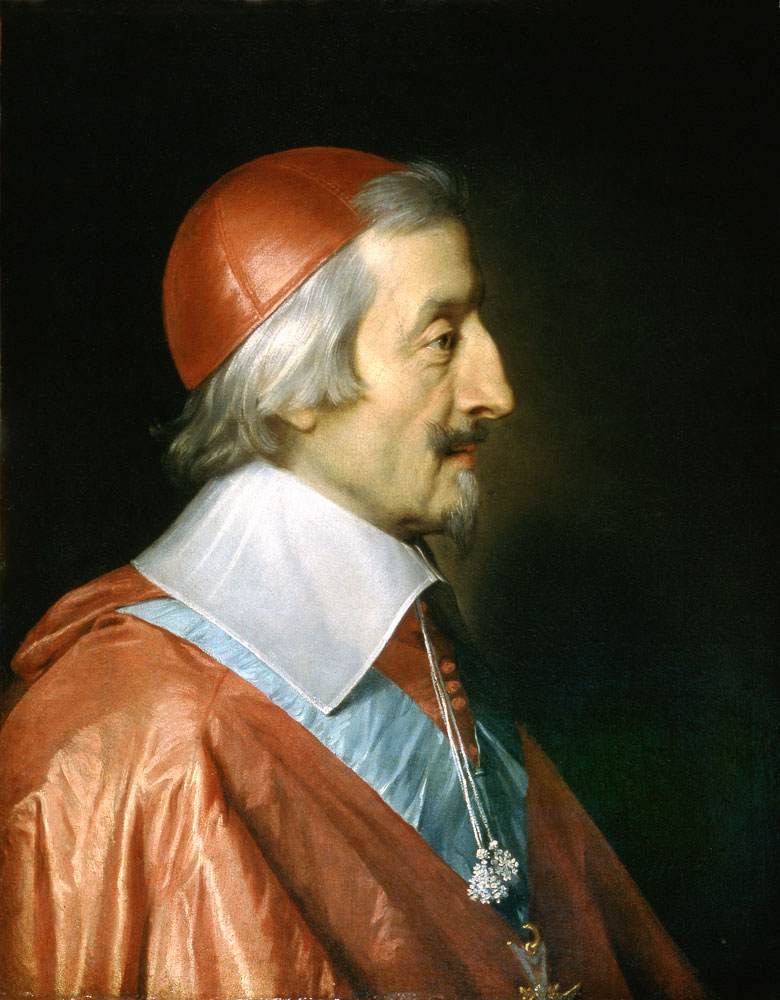
- Portrait of Cardinal Richelieu (1642)

Chief Minister of State of France
- In office 12 August 1624 – 4 December 1642
- Monarch: Louis XIII
- Preceded by: The Marquis of Ancre; Vacant (1617–1624)
- Succeeded by: Jules Mazarin

Governor of Brittany
- In office 17 April 1632 – 4 December 1642
- Monarch: Louis XIII
- Preceded by: The Marquis of Thémines
- Succeeded by: Queen Anne

Grand Master of Navigation of France
- In office 1626–1642
- Monarch: Louis XIII
- Preceded by: The Duke of Montmorency
- Succeeded by: The Marquis of Brézé

Secretary of State for Foreign Affairs of France
- In office 30 November 1616 – 24 April 1617
- Monarch: Louis XIII
- First Minister of State: Concino Concini
- Preceded by: Claude Mangot
- Succeeded by: The Marquis of Sillery

Secretary of State for War of France
- Interim
- In office 25 November 1616 – 24 April 1617
- Monarch: Louis XIII
- First Minister of State: Concino Concini
- Preceded by: Claude Mangot
- Succeeded by: Nicolas Brulart de Sillery

Personal details
- Born: Armand Jean du Plessis; 9 September 1585 Paris, France
- Died: 4 December 1642 (aged 57) Paris, France
- Resting place: Sorbonne Chapel
- Education: College of Navarre
- Profession: Clergyman, statesman
- Cardinal, Bishop of Luçon
- Metropolis: Bordeaux
- Diocese: Luçon
- See: Luçon
- Appointed: 18 December 1606
- Installed: 17 April 1607
- Term ended: Before 29 April 1624
- Predecessor: François Yver
- Successor: Emery de Bragelongne
- Previous posts: Territorial abbot Coadjutor of Cluny (1627–1635); Territorial abbot of Cluny (1635–1642)

Orders
- Consecration: 17 April 1607 by Anne d'Escars de Givry
- Created cardinal: 5 September 1622 by Pope Gregory XV
- Rank: Cardinal-Priest

Personal details
- Signature: Cardinal Richelieu's signature

- Coat of arms: Cardinal Richelieu's coat of arms

Styles of Armand Jean du Plessis de Richelieu
- Reference style: His Grand Eminence
- Spoken style: Your Grand Eminence
- Informal style: Cardinal
- See: Luçon

Armand Jean du Plessis, (Note: French: [aʁmɑ̃ ʒɑ̃ dy plɛsi]) 1st Duke of Richelieu (9 September 1585 – 4 December 1642), commonly known as Cardinal Richelieu, (Note: UK: /ˈrɪʃəljɜːr, ˈriːʃ-/, US: /ˈrɪʃəl(j)uː, ˈriːʃ-/; French: Cardinal de Richelieu [kaʁdinal d(ə) ʁiʃ(ə)ljø]) was a French Catholic prelate and statesman who had an outsized influence in civil and religious affairs. He became known as the Red Eminence (French: l'Éminence Rouge), a term derived from the style of Eminence applied to cardinals and their customary red robes.

Consecrated a bishop in 1607, Richelieu was appointed Foreign Secretary in 1616. He continued to rise through the hierarchy of both the Catholic Church and the French government, becoming a cardinal in 1622 and chief minister to King Louis XIII in 1624. He retained that office until his death in 1642, when he was succeeded by Cardinal Jules Mazarin, whose career the cardinal had fostered. Richelieu became engaged in a bitter dispute with Marie de Médici, the king's mother, and formerly his close ally.

Richelieu sought to consolidate royal power and restrained the power of the nobility in order to transform France into a strong centralized state. In foreign policy, his primary objectives were to check the power of the Habsburg dynasty (reigning notably in Spain and Austria) and to ensure French dominance in the Thirty Years' War of 1618–1648 after that conflict engulfed Europe. Despite suppressing the Huguenot rebellions of the 1620s, he supported Protestant states like the Swedish Empire and the Dutch Republic to help him achieve his goals. Although he was a powerful political figure in his own right, events such as the Day of the Dupes (French: Journée des Dupes) in 1630 showed that Richelieu's power still depended on the king's confidence.

An alumnus of the University of Paris and headmaster of the College of Sorbonne, Richelieu renovated and extended the latter institution. He became famous for his patronage of the arts and founded the Académie Française, the learned society responsible for matters pertaining to the French language. As an advocate for Samuel de Champlain and New France, he founded (1627) the Compagnie des Cent-Associés; he also negotiated the 1632 Treaty of Saint-Germain-en-Laye under which Quebec City returned to French rule after English privateers took it in 1629. He was created Duke of Richelieu in 1629.

== Early life ==
Born in Paris on 9 September 1585, Armand du Plessis was the fourth of five children and the last of three sons: he was delicate from childhood and suffered frequent bouts of ill-health throughout his life. His family belonged to the lesser nobility of Poitou: his father, François du Plessis, seigneur de Richelieu, was a soldier and courtier who served as the Grand Provost of France, and his mother, Susanne de La Porte, was the daughter of a famous jurist.

When Richelieu was five years old, his father died of fever in the French Wars of Religion, leaving the family in debt; however, with the aid of royal grants, the family was able to avoid financial difficulties. At age nine, young Richelieu was sent to the College of Navarre in Paris to study philosophy. Thereafter, he began to train for a military career. There, he learned mathematics, fencing, horse riding, dancing skills, courtly manners, and military drill. His private life seems to have been typical for a young officer of the era; in 1605, aged twenty, he was treated by Théodore de Mayerne for gonorrhea.

Henry III had rewarded Richelieu's father for his participation in the Wars of Religion by granting his family the Bishopric of Luçon. The family appropriated most of the revenues of the bishopric for private use; they were, however, challenged by clergymen who desired the funds for ecclesiastical purposes. To protect the important source of revenue, Richelieu's mother proposed to make her second son, Alphonse, the bishop of Luçon. Alphonse, who had no desire to become a bishop, became instead a Carthusian monk. Thus, it became necessary that the younger Richelieu join the clergy. He had strong academic interests and threw himself into studying for his new post.

In 1606, Henry IV nominated Richelieu to become Bishop of Luçon. As Richelieu had not yet reached the canonical minimum age, it was necessary that he journey to Rome for a special dispensation from Pope Paul V. This secured, Richelieu was consecrated bishop in April 1607. Soon after he returned to his diocese in 1608, Richelieu was heralded as a reformer. He became the first bishop in France to implement the institutional reforms prescribed by the Council of Trent between 1545 and 1563.

At about this time, Richelieu became a friend of François Leclerc du Tremblay (better known as "Père Joseph" or "Father Joseph"), a Capuchin friar, who would later become a close confidant. Because of his closeness to Richelieu, and the grey colour of his robes, Father Joseph was nicknamed L'éminence grise (lit. 'the Grey Eminence'). Later, Richelieu often used him as an agent during diplomatic negotiations.

== Rise to power ==
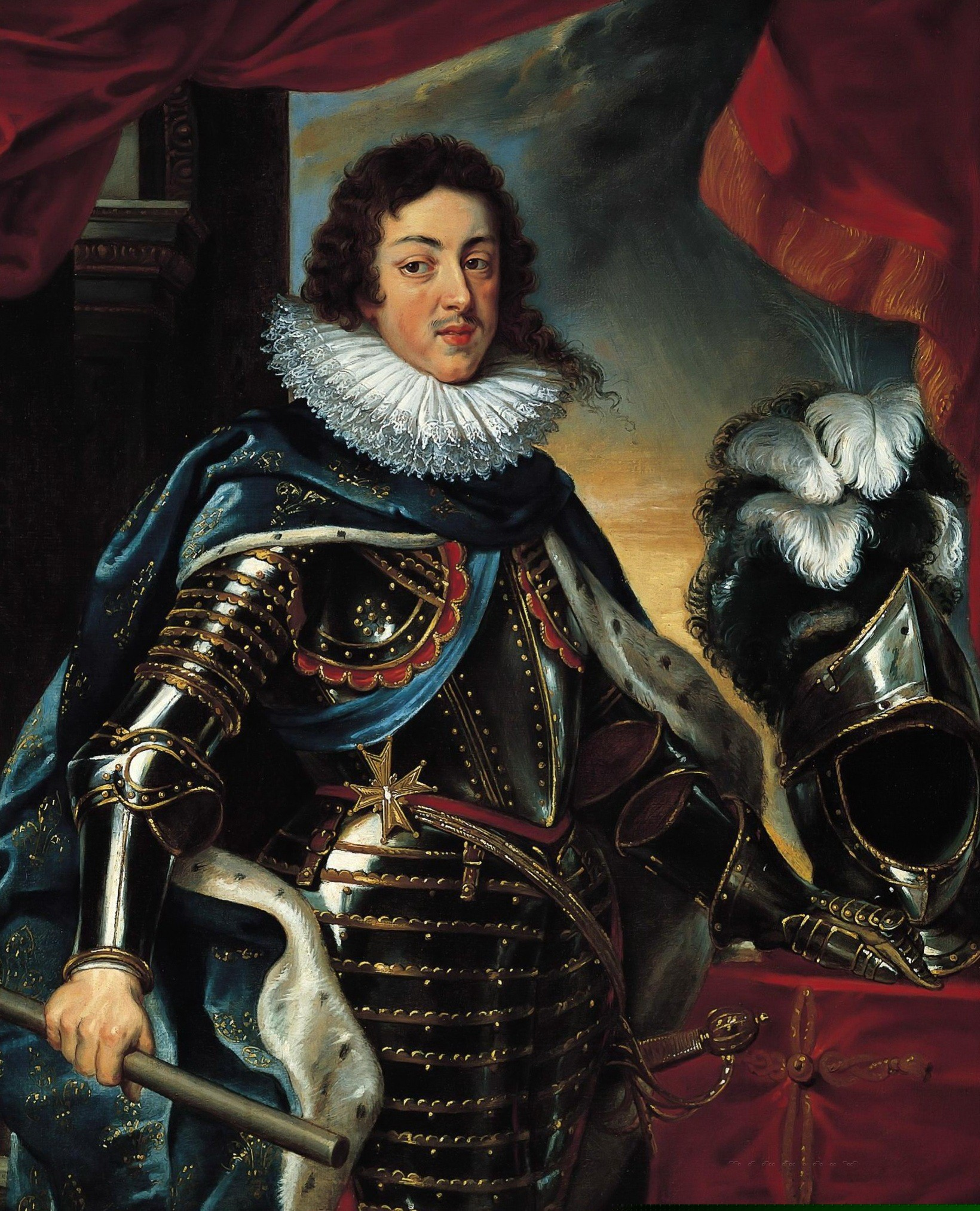
The young Louis XIII, only a figurehead during his early reign, power actually resting with his mother, Marie de' Medici

In 1614, the clergymen of Poitou asked Richelieu to be one of their representatives to the Estates-General. There, he was a vigorous advocate of the Catholic Church, arguing that it should be exempt from taxes and that bishops should have more political power. He was the most prominent clergyman to support the adoption of the decrees of the Council of Trent throughout France; the Third Estate (commoners) was his chief opponent in this endeavour. At the end of the assembly, the First Estate (the clergy) chose him to deliver the address enumerating its petitions and decisions. Soon after the dissolution of the Estates-General, Richelieu entered the service of King Louis XIII's wife, Anne of Austria, as her almoner.

Richelieu advanced politically by faithfully serving the queen-mother's favourite, Concino Concini, the most powerful minister in the kingdom. In 1616, Richelieu was made Secretary of State, and was given responsibility for foreign affairs. Like Concini, the Bishop was one of the closest advisors of Louis XIII's mother, Marie de' Medici. The queen had become Regent of France when the nine-year-old Louis ascended the throne; although her son reached the legal age of majority in 1614, she remained the effective ruler of the realm. However, her policies, and those of Concini, proved unpopular with many in France. As a result, both Marie and Concini became the targets of intrigues at court; their most powerful enemy was Charles de Luynes. In April 1617, in a plot arranged by Luynes, Louis XIII ordered that Concini be arrested, and killed should he resist; Concini was consequently assassinated, and Marie de Médici overthrown. His patron having died, Richelieu also lost power; he was dismissed as Secretary of State, and was removed from the court. In 1618, the king, still suspicious of the Bishop of Luçon, banished him to Avignon. There, Richelieu spent most of his time writing; he composed a catechism titled L'Instruction du chrétien.

In 1619, Marie de Médici escaped from her confinement in the Château de Blois, becoming the titular leader of an aristocratic rebellion. The king and the duc de Luynes recalled Richelieu, believing that he would be able to reason with the queen. Richelieu was successful in this endeavour, mediating between her and her son. Complex negotiations bore fruit when the Treaty of Angoulême was ratified; Marie de Médici was given complete freedom, but would remain at peace with the king. The queen-mother was restored to the royal council.

After the death of the king's favourite, the duc de Luynes, in 1621, Richelieu rose to power quickly. The year after, the king nominated Richelieu for a cardinalate, which Pope Gregory XV accordingly granted in September 1622. Crises in France, including a rebellion of the Huguenots, rendered Richelieu a nearly indispensable advisor to the king. After he was appointed to the royal council of ministers on 29 April 1624, he intrigued against the chief minister Charles, duc de La Vieuville. On 12 August of the same year, La Vieuville was arrested on charges of corruption, and Cardinal Richelieu took his place as the king's principal minister the following day, but the Cardinal de la Rochefoucauld nominally remained president of the council (Richelieu was officially appointed president in November 1629).

== Chief minister ==
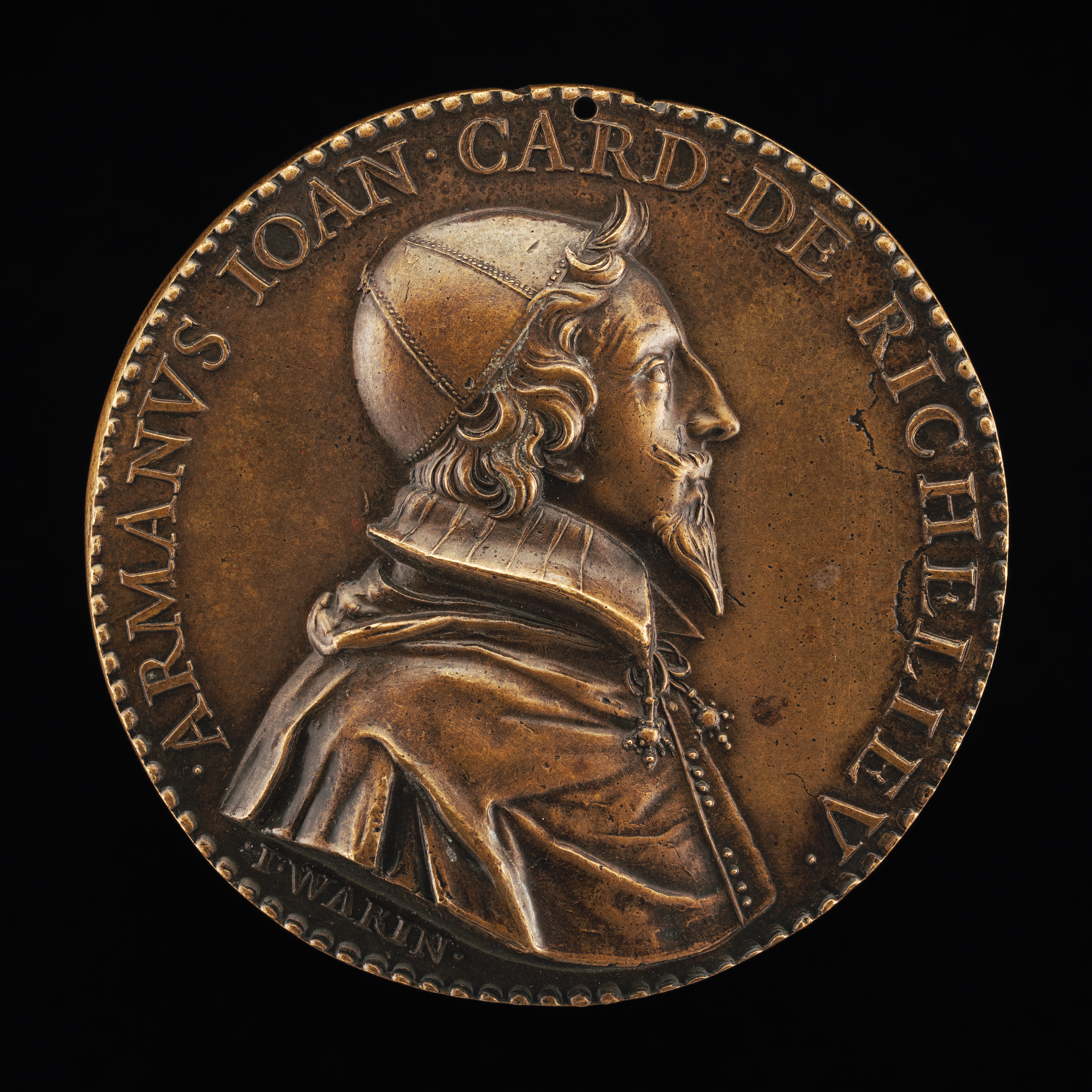
Jean Warin, Cardinal de Richelieu 1622 (obverse), 1631

Cardinal Richelieu's policy involved two primary goals: centralization of power in France and opposition to the Habsburg dynasty (which ruled in both Austria and Spain). He saw the needed reestablishment of the Catholic orthodoxy as a political maneuver of the Habsburg and Austrian states which was detrimental to the French national interests.

Shortly after he became Louis's principal minister, he was faced with a crisis in Valtellina, a valley in Lombardy (northern Italy). To counter Spanish designs on the territory, Richelieu supported the Protestant Swiss canton of Grisons, which also claimed the strategically important valley. The cardinal deployed troops to Valtellina, from which the pope's garrisons were driven out. Richelieu's early decision to support a Protestant canton against the pope was a foretaste of the purely diplomatic power politics he espoused in his foreign policy.

To further consolidate power in France, Richelieu sought to suppress the influence of the feudal nobility. In 1626, he abolished the position of Constable of France and ordered all fortified castles razed, with the exception only of those needed to defend against invaders. Thus he stripped the princes, dukes, and lesser aristocrats of important defences that could have been used against the king's armies during rebellions. As a result, Richelieu was hated by most of the nobility.

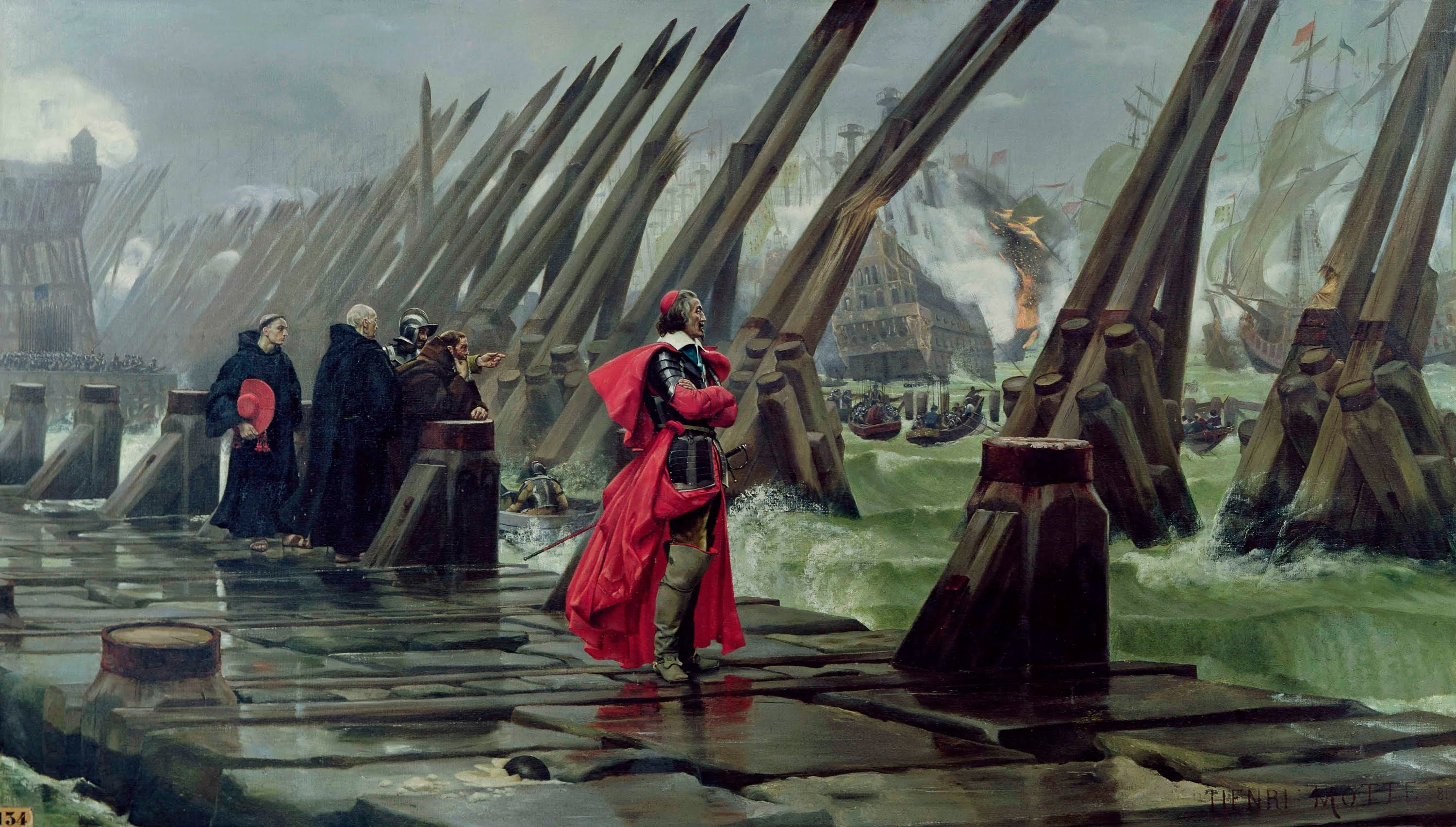
Henri Motte's depiction of Cardinal Richelieu at the siege of La Rochelle.

Another obstacle to the centralization of power was religious division in France. The Huguenots, one of the largest political and religious factions in the country, controlled a significant military force, and were in rebellion. Moreover, Charles I, the king of England, declared war on France in an attempt to aid the Huguenot faction. In 1627, Richelieu ordered the army to besiege the Huguenot stronghold of La Rochelle; the cardinal personally commanded the besieging troops. English troops under the Duke of Buckingham led an expedition to help the citizens of La Rochelle, but failed abysmally. The city, however, remained firm for over a year before capitulating in 1628.

Although the Huguenots suffered a major defeat at La Rochelle, they continued to fight, led by Henri, duc de Rohan. Protestant forces, however, were defeated in 1629; Rohan submitted to the terms of the Peace of Alais. As a result, religious toleration for Protestants, which had first been granted by the Edict of Nantes in 1598, was permitted to continue, but the cardinal abolished their political rights and protections. Rohan was not executed (as were leaders of rebellions later in Richelieu's tenure); in fact, he later became a commanding officer in the French army.

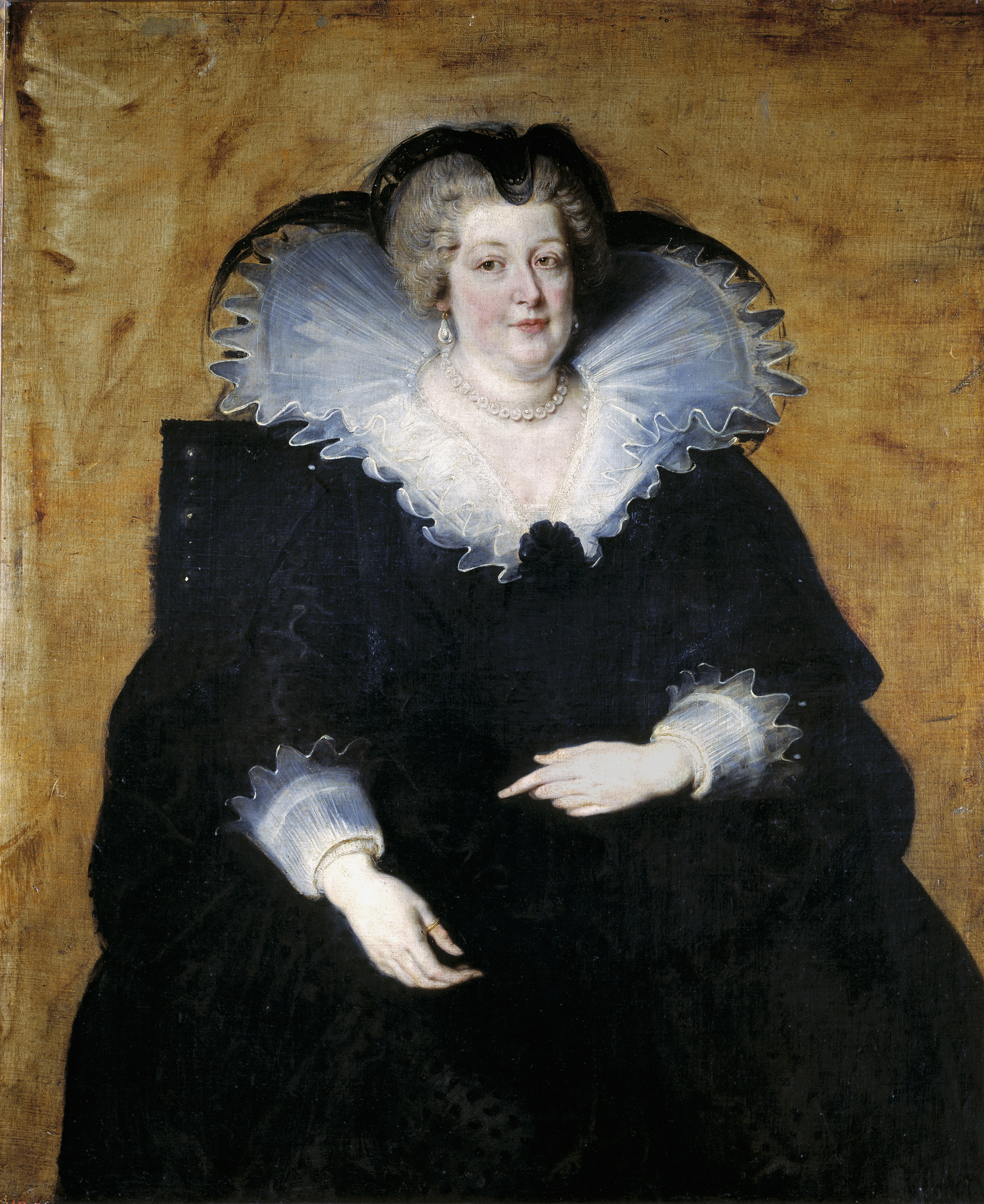
On the "Day of the Dupes" in 1630, it appeared that Marie de Médici had secured Richelieu's dismissal. Richelieu, however, survived the scheme, and Marie was exiled as a result.

Habsburg Spain exploited the French conflict with the Huguenots to extend its influence in northern Italy. It funded the Huguenot rebels to keep the French army occupied, meanwhile expanding its Italian dominions. Richelieu, however, responded aggressively; after La Rochelle capitulated, he personally led the French army to northern Italy to restrain Spain. On 26 November 1629, he was created duc de Richelieu and a Peer of France. In the next year, Richelieu's position was seriously threatened by his former patron, Marie de Médici. Marie believed that the cardinal had robbed her of her political influence; thus, she demanded that her son dismiss the chief minister. Louis XIII was not, at first, averse to such a course of action, as he personally disliked Richelieu. Despite this, the persuasive statesman was able to secure the king as an ally against his own mother. On 11 November 1630, Marie de Médici's and the king's brother, Gaston, duc d'Orléans, secured the king's agreement for the dismissal. Richelieu, however, was aware of the plan, and quickly convinced the king to repent.

Meanwhile, Marie de Médici was exiled to Compiègne. Both Marie and the duc d'Orléans continued to conspire against Richelieu, but their schemes came to nothing. The nobility also remained powerless. The only important rising was that of Henri, duc de Montmorency in 1632; Richelieu, ruthless in suppressing opposition, ordered the duke's execution. In 1634, the cardinal had one of his outspoken critics, Urbain Grandier, burned at the stake in the Loudun affair. These and other harsh measures were orchestrated by Richelieu to intimidate his enemies. He also ensured his political security by establishing a large network of spies in France and in other European countries.

== Thirty Years' War ==
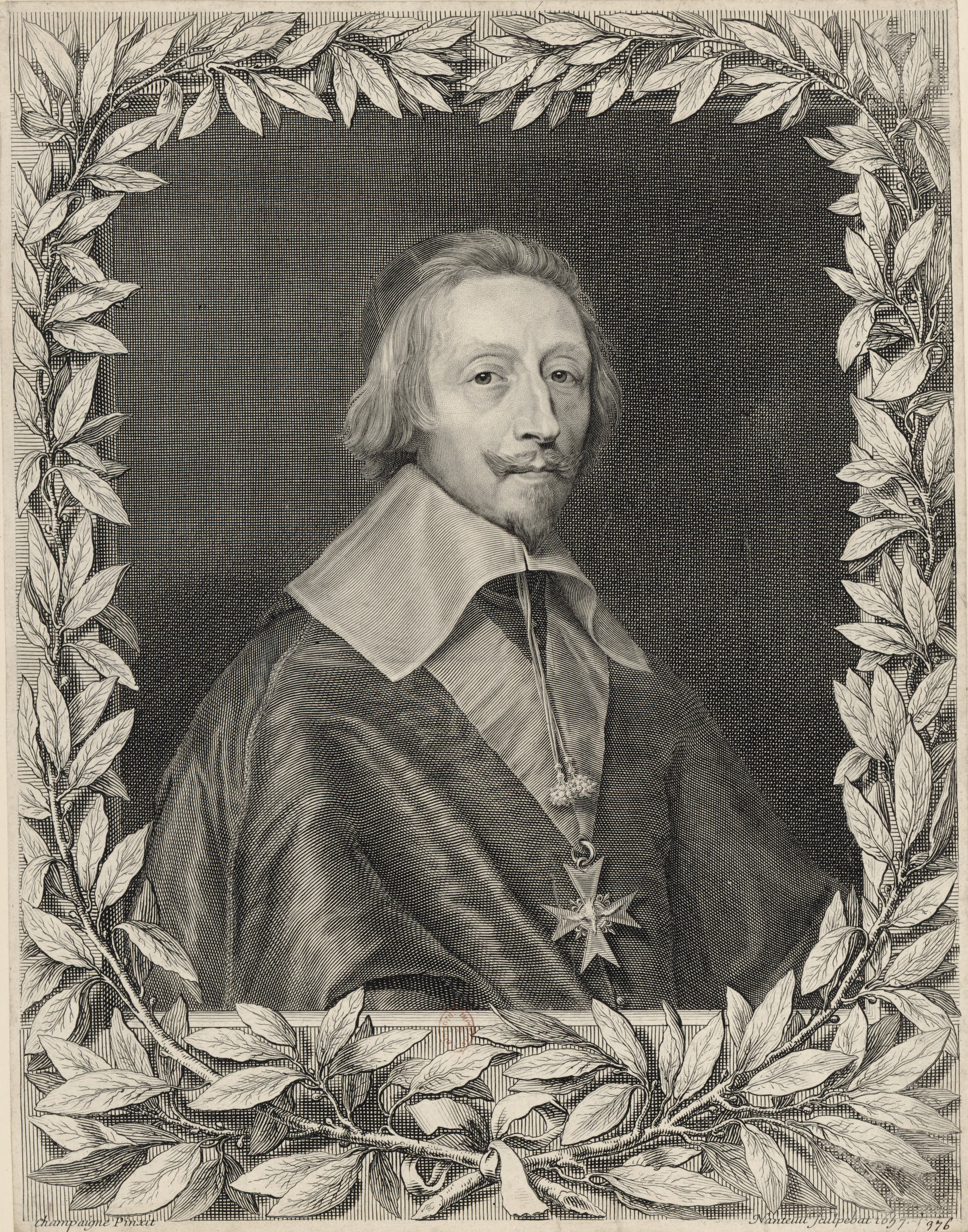
Cardinal Richelieu by Robert Nanteuil

Before Richelieu's ascent to power, most of Europe had become enmeshed in the Thirty Years' War (1618–1648). France was not openly at war with the Habsburgs, who ruled Spain and the Holy Roman Empire, so subsidies and aid were provided secretly to their adversaries. Richelieu however, believed that war against Spain would be unavoidable.

Richelieu considered the Dutch Republic as one of France's most important allies, for it bordered directly with the Spanish Netherlands and was right in the middle of the Eighty Years' War with Spain at that time. The king had already decided to subsidize the Dutch to fight against the Spanish via the Treaty of Compiègne in June 1624, prior to Richelieu's appointment to First Minister in August. That same year, a military expedition, secretly financed by France and commanded by Marquis de Coeuvres, started an action with the intention of liberating the Valtelline from Spanish occupation. In 1625, Richelieu also sent money to Ernst von Mansfeld, a famous mercenary general operating in Germany in English service. However, in May 1626, when war costs had almost ruined France, king and cardinal made peace with Spain via the Treaty of Monçon. This peace quickly ended after tensions due to the War of the Mantuan Succession.

In 1629, Emperor Ferdinand II subjugated many of his Protestant opponents in Germany. Richelieu, alarmed by Ferdinand's growing influence, incited Sweden to intervene, providing money. In the meantime, France and Spain remained hostile due to Spain's ambitions in northern Italy. At that time northern Italy was a major strategic region in Europe's balance of power, serving as a link between the Habsburgs in the Empire and in Spain. Had the imperial armies dominated this region, France would have been threatened by Habsburg encirclement. Spain was meanwhile seeking papal approval for a universal monarchy. When in 1630 French diplomats in Regensburg agreed to make peace with Spain, Richelieu refused to support them. The agreement would have prohibited French interference in Germany. Therefore, Richelieu advised Louis XIII to refuse to ratify the treaty. In 1631, he allied France to Sweden, which had just invaded the empire, in the Treaty of Bärwalde.

Military expenses placed a considerable strain on royal revenues. In response, Richelieu raised the gabelle (salt tax) and the taille (land tax). The taille was enforced to provide funds to raise armies and wage war. The clergy, nobility, and high bourgeoisie either were exempt or could easily avoid payment, so the burden fell on the poorest segment of the nation. To collect taxes more efficiently, and to keep corruption to a minimum, Richelieu bypassed local tax officials, replacing them with intendants (officials in the direct service of the Crown). Richelieu's financial scheme, however, caused unrest among the peasants; there were several uprisings in 1636 to 1639. Richelieu crushed the revolts violently, and dealt with the rebels harshly.

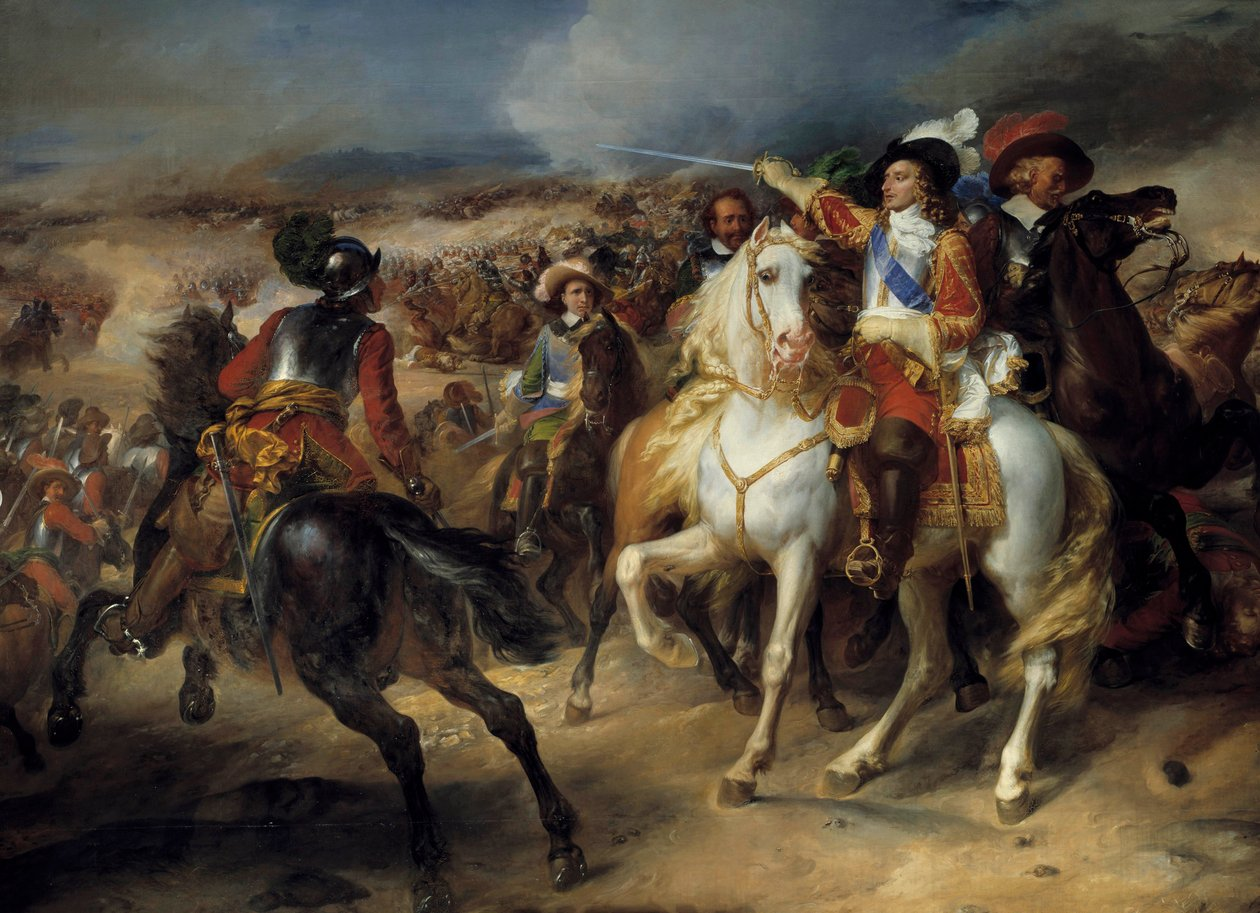
The Battle of Lens

Because he openly aligned France with Protestant powers, Richelieu was denounced by many as a traitor to the Roman Catholic Church. He also ordered ships of war from the Calvinist Jean Bicker. Military action, at first, was disastrous for the French, with many victories going to Spain and the Empire. Neither side, however, could obtain a decisive advantage, and the conflict lingered on after Richelieu's death. Richelieu was instrumental in redirecting the Thirty Years' War from the conflict of Protestantism versus Catholicism to that of nationalism versus Habsburg hegemony.

France effectively drained the already overstretched resources of the Habsburg empire and drove it inexorably towards bankruptcy. The defeat of Habsburg forces at the Battle of Lens in 1648, coupled with their failure to prevent a French invasion of Catalonia, effectively spelled the end for Habsburg domination of the continent, and for the personal career of Spanish prime minister Olivares.

== New World ==
When Richelieu came to power, New France, where the French had a foothold since Jacques Cartier, had no more than 100 permanent European inhabitants. Richelieu encouraged Louis XIII to colonize the Americas by the foundation of the Compagnie de la Nouvelle France in imitation of the Dutch West India Company. Unlike some other colonial powers, France encouraged a peaceful coexistence in New France between natives and colonists and sought the integration of Indians into colonial society.

Samuel de Champlain, governor of New France at the time of Richelieu, saw intermarriage between French and Indians as a solution to increase population in its colony. Under the guidance of Richelieu, Louis XIII issued the Ordonnance of 1627 by which the Indians, converted to Catholicism, were considered as "natural Frenchmen":

The descendants of the French who are accustomed to this country [New France], together with all the Indians who will be brought to the knowledge of the faith and will profess it, shall be deemed and renowned natural Frenchmen, and as such may come to live in France when they want, and acquire, donate, and succeed and accept donations and legacies, just as true French subjects, without being required to take letters of declaration of naturalization.

The 1666 census of New France, conducted some 20 years after the death of Cardinal Richelieu, showed a population of 3,215 habitants in New France, many more than there had been only a few decades earlier, but also a great difference in the number of men (2,034) and women (1,181).

== Final years ==
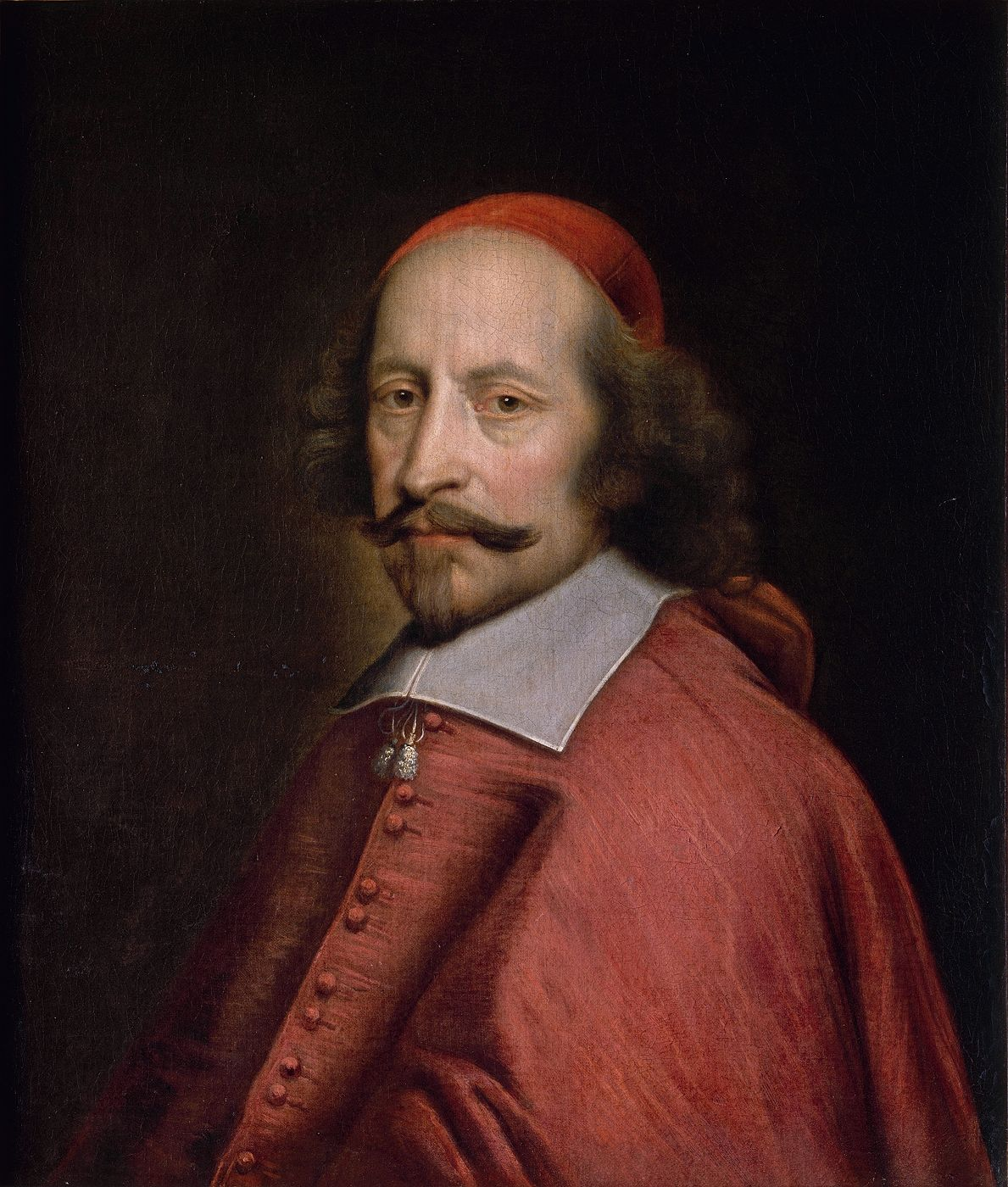
Cardinal Mazarin (depicted here in 1660, age 58) succeeded Richelieu in office.

Toward the end of his life, Richelieu alienated many people, including Pope Urban VIII. Richelieu was displeased by the pope's refusal to name him the papal legate in France; in turn, the pope did not approve of the administration of the French church, or of French foreign policy. However, the conflict was largely resolved when the pope granted a cardinalate to Jules Mazarin, one of Richelieu's main political allies, in 1641. Despite troubled relations with the Roman Catholic Church, Richelieu did not support the complete repudiation of papal authority in France, as was advocated by the Gallicanists.

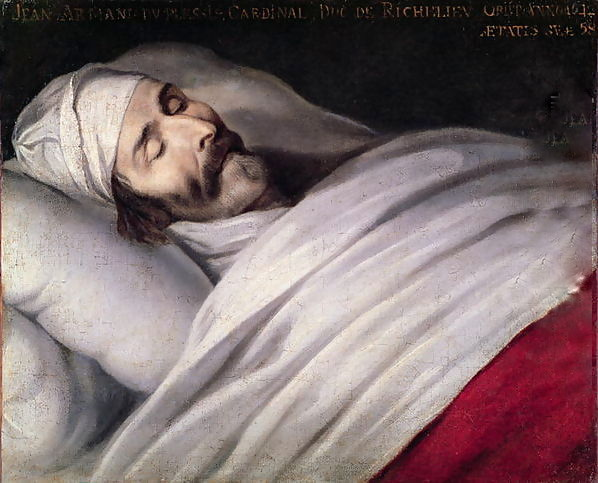
Painting by Philippe de Champaigne showing Cardinal Richelieu on his deathbed

As he neared death, Richelieu faced a plot that threatened to remove him from power. The cardinal had introduced a young man named Henri Coiffier de Ruzé, marquis de Cinq-Mars to Louis XIII's court. The cardinal had been a friend of Cinq-Mars's father. More importantly, Richelieu hoped that Cinq-Mars would become Louis's favourite, so that he could indirectly exercise greater influence over the monarch's decisions. Cinq-Mars had become the royal favourite by 1639, but, contrary to Cardinal Richelieu's belief, he was not easy to control. The young marquis realized that Richelieu would not permit him to gain political power. In 1641, he participated in the comte de Soissons's failed conspiracy against Richelieu, but was not discovered. Then, the following year, he schemed with leading nobles (including the king's brother, the duc d'Orléans) to raise a rebellion; he also signed a secret agreement with the king of Spain, who promised to aid the rebels. Richelieu's spy service, however, discovered the plot, and the cardinal received a copy of the treaty. Cinq-Mars was promptly arrested and executed; although Louis approved the use of capital punishment, he grew more distant from Richelieu as a result.

However, Richelieu was now dying. For many years he suffered from recurrent fevers (possibly malaria), strangury, intestinal tuberculosis with fistula, and migraine. Now his right arm was suppurating with tubercular osteitis, and he coughed blood (after his death, his lungs were found to have extensive cavities and caseous necrosis). His doctors continued to bleed him frequently, further weakening him. As he felt his death approaching, he named Mazarin, one of his most faithful followers, to succeed him as chief minister to the king.

Richelieu died on 4 December 1642, aged 57. His body was embalmed and interred at the church of the Sorbonne. By that time, the populace detested him. In many provinces of the kingdom, bonfires were kindled to celebrate his death. During the French Revolution, the corpse was removed from its tomb, and the mummified front of his head, having been removed and replaced during the original embalming process, was stolen. It ended up in the possession of Nicholas Armez of Brittany by 1796, and he occasionally exhibited the well-preserved face. His nephew, Louis-Philippe Armez, inherited it and also occasionally exhibited it and lent it out for study. In 1866, Napoleon III persuaded Armez to return the face to the government for re-interment with the rest of Richelieu's body. An investigation of subsidence of the church floor enabled the head to be photographed in 1895.

== Arts and culture ==
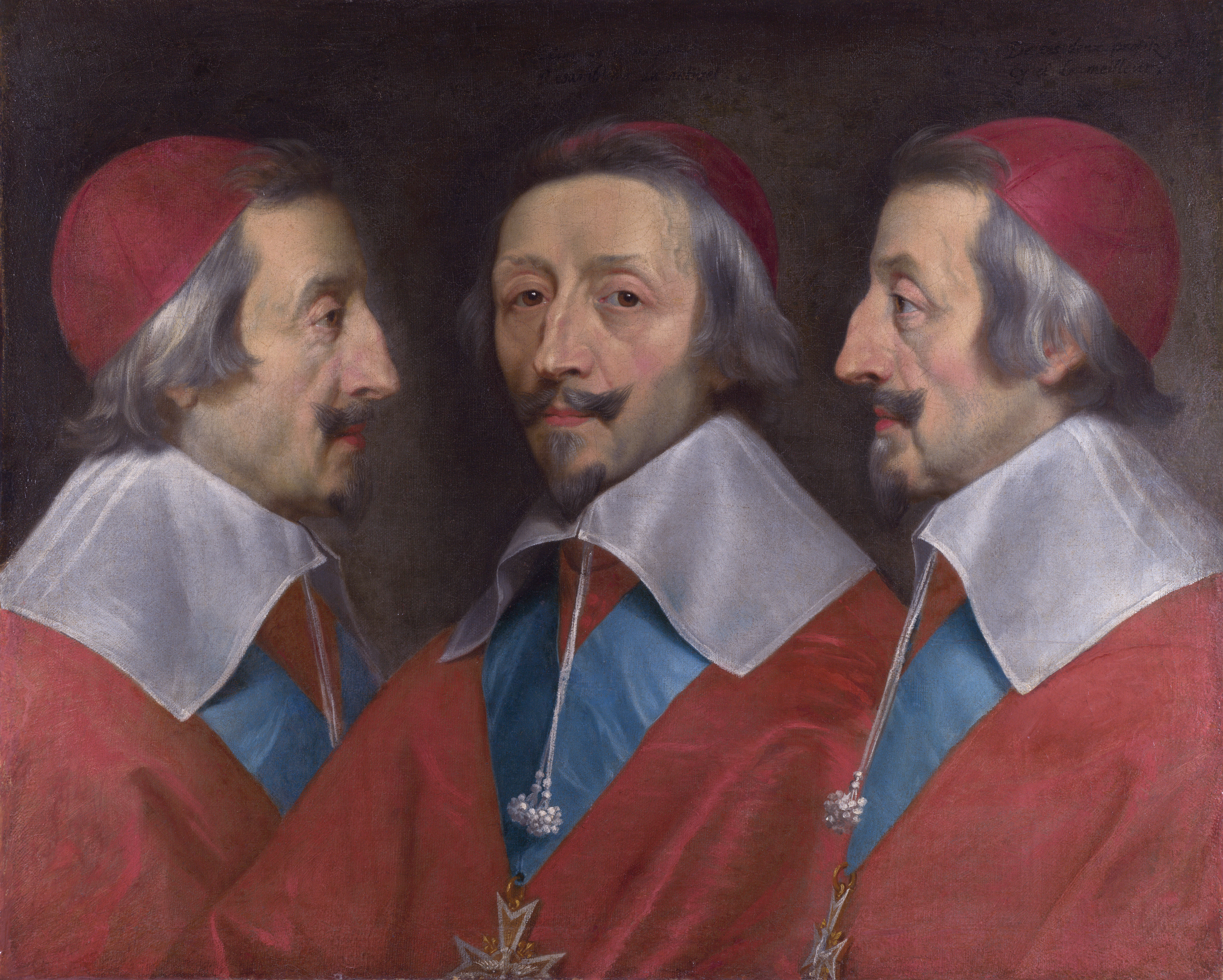
Triple Portrait of Cardinal de Richelieu, by Philippe de Champaigne (c. 1642)

Richelieu was a chess player and a famous patron of the arts. An author of various religious and political works (most notably his Political Testament), he sent his agents abroad in search of books and manuscripts for his unrivaled library, which he specified in his will – leaving it to Armand Jean de Vignerot du Plessis, his great-nephew, fully funded – should serve not merely his family but to be open at fixed hours to scholars. The manuscripts alone numbered some 900, bound as codices in red Morocco with the cardinal's arms. The library was transferred to the Sorbonne in 1660. He funded the literary careers of many writers. He was a lover of the theatre, which was not considered a respectable art form during that era; a private theatre, the Grande Salle, was a feature of his Paris residence, the Palais-Cardinal. Among the individuals he patronized was the famous playwright Pierre Corneille. Richelieu was also the founder and patron of the Académie française, the pre-eminent French literary society. The institution had previously been in informal existence; in 1635, however, Cardinal Richelieu obtained official letters patent for the body. The Académie française includes 40 members, promotes French literature, and remains the official authority on the French language. Richelieu served as the Académie's protector. Since 1672, that role has been fulfilled by the French head of state.

In 1622, Richelieu was elected the proviseur or principal of the Sorbonne. He presided over the renovation of the college's buildings and over the construction of its famous chapel, where he is now entombed. As he was Bishop of Luçon, his statue stands outside the Luçon cathedral.

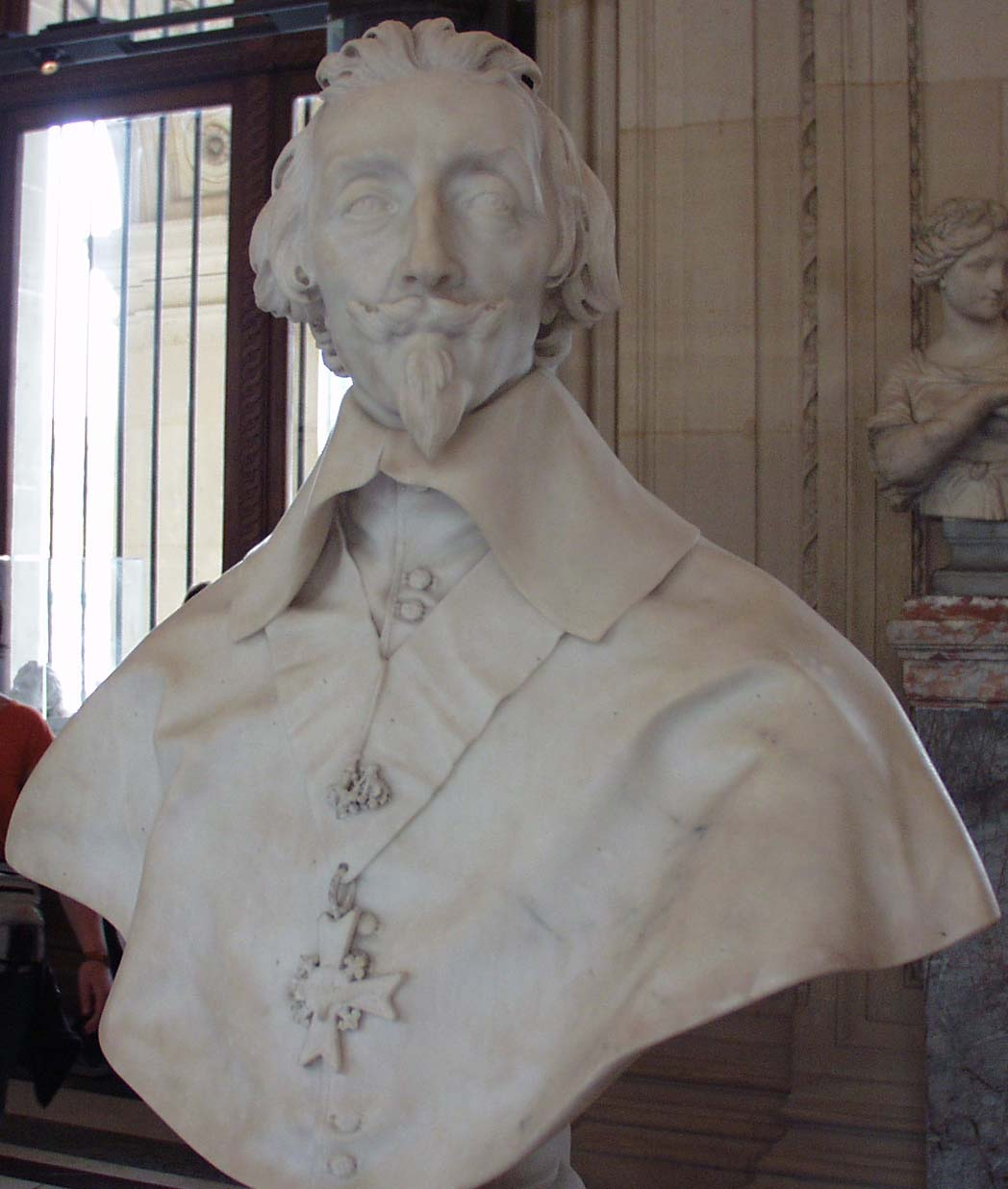
Bust of Cardinal Richelieu by Gianlorenzo Bernini

Richelieu oversaw the construction of his own palace in Paris, the Palais-Cardinal. The palace, renamed the Palais-Royal after Richelieu's death, now houses the French Constitutional Council, the Ministry of Culture, and the Conseil d'État. The Galerie de l'avant-cour had ceiling paintings by Philippe de Champaigne, the cardinal's chief portraitist, celebrating the major events of the cardinal's career; the Galerie des hommes illustres had twenty-six historicizing portraits of great men, larger than life, from Abbot Suger to Louis XIII; some were by Simon Vouet, others were careful copies by Philippe de Champaigne from known portraits; with them were busts of Roman emperors. Another series of portraits of authors complemented the library. The architect of the Palais-Cardinal, Jacques Lemercier, also received a commission to build a château and a surrounding town in Indre-et-Loire; the project culminated in the construction of the Château Richelieu and the town of Richelieu. To the château, he added one of the largest art collections in Europe and the largest collection of ancient Roman sculpture in France. The heavily resurfaced and restored Richelieu Bacchus continued to be admired by neoclassical artists. Among his 300 paintings by moderns, most notably, he owned Leonardo's Virgin and Child with Saint Anne, The Family of the Virgin by Andrea del Sarto, the two famous Bacchanales of Nicolas Poussin, as well as paintings by Veronese and Titian, and Diana at the Bath by Rubens, for which he was so glad to pay the artist's heirs 3,000 écus, that he made a gift to Rubens' widow of a diamond-encrusted watch. His marble portrait bust by Bernini was not considered a good likeness and was banished to a passageway.

The fittings of his chapel in the Palais-Cardinal, for which Simon Vouet executed the paintings, were of solid gold – crucifix, chalice, paten, ciborium, candlesticks – set with 180 rubies and 9,000 diamonds. His taste also ran to massive silver, small bronzes and works of vertu, enamels and rock crystal mounted in gold, Chinese porcelains, tapestries and Persian carpets, cabinets from Italy, and Antwerp and the heart-shaped diamond bought from Alphonse Lopez that he willed to the king. When the Palais-Cardinal was complete, he donated it to the Crown, in 1636. With the queen in residence, the paintings of the Grand Cabinet were transferred to Fontainebleau and replaced by copies, and the interiors were subjected to much rearrangement.

Michelangelo's two Slaves were among the rich appointments of the château Richelieu, where there were the Nativity triptych by Dürer, and paintings by Mantegna, Lorenzo Costa and Perugino, lifted from the Gonzaga collection at Mantua by French military forces in 1630, as well as numerous antiquities.

== Legacy ==
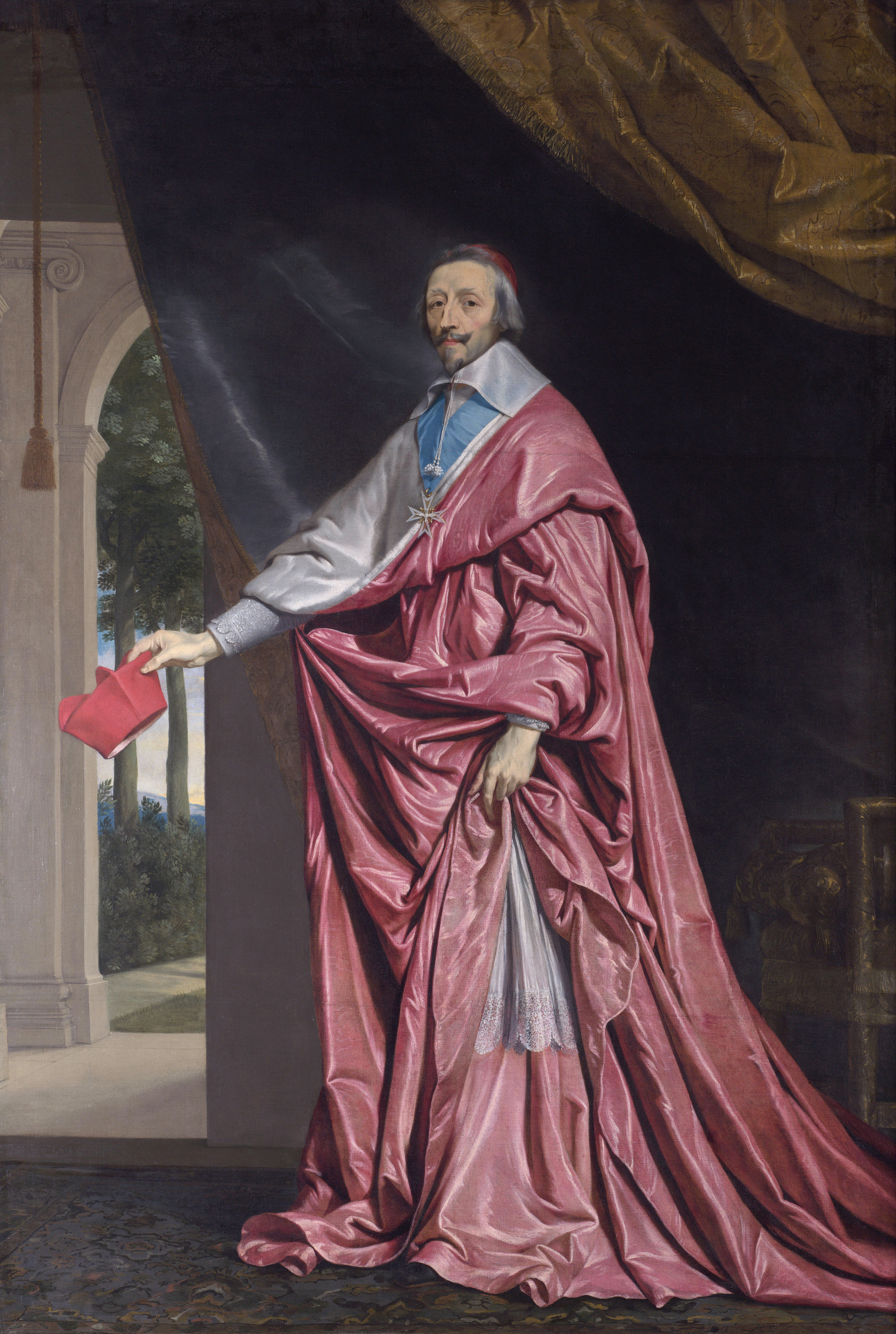
Portrait by Philippe de Champaigne, c. 1633–1640

Richelieu's tenure was a crucial period of reform for France. Earlier, the nation's political structure was largely feudal, with powerful nobles and a wide variety of laws in different regions. Parts of the nobility periodically conspired against the king, raised private armies, and allied themselves with foreign powers. This system gave way to centralized power under Richelieu. Local and even religious interests were subordinated to those of the whole nation, and of the embodiment of the nation – the king. Equally critical for France was Richelieu's foreign policy, which helped restrain Habsburg influence in Europe. Richelieu did not survive to the end of the Thirty Years' War. However, the conflict ended in 1648, with France emerging in a far better position than any other power, and the Holy Roman Empire entering a period of decline.

Richelieu's successes were extremely important to Louis XIII's successor, King Louis XIV. He continued Richelieu's work of creating an absolute monarchy; in the same vein as the cardinal, he enacted policies that further suppressed the once-mighty aristocracy, and utterly destroyed all remnants of Huguenot political power with the Edict of Fontainebleau. Moreover, Louis took advantage of his nation's success during the Thirty Years' War to establish French hegemony in continental Europe. Thus, Richelieu's policies were the requisite prelude to Louis XIV becoming the most powerful monarch, and France the most powerful nation, in all of Europe during the late seventeenth century.

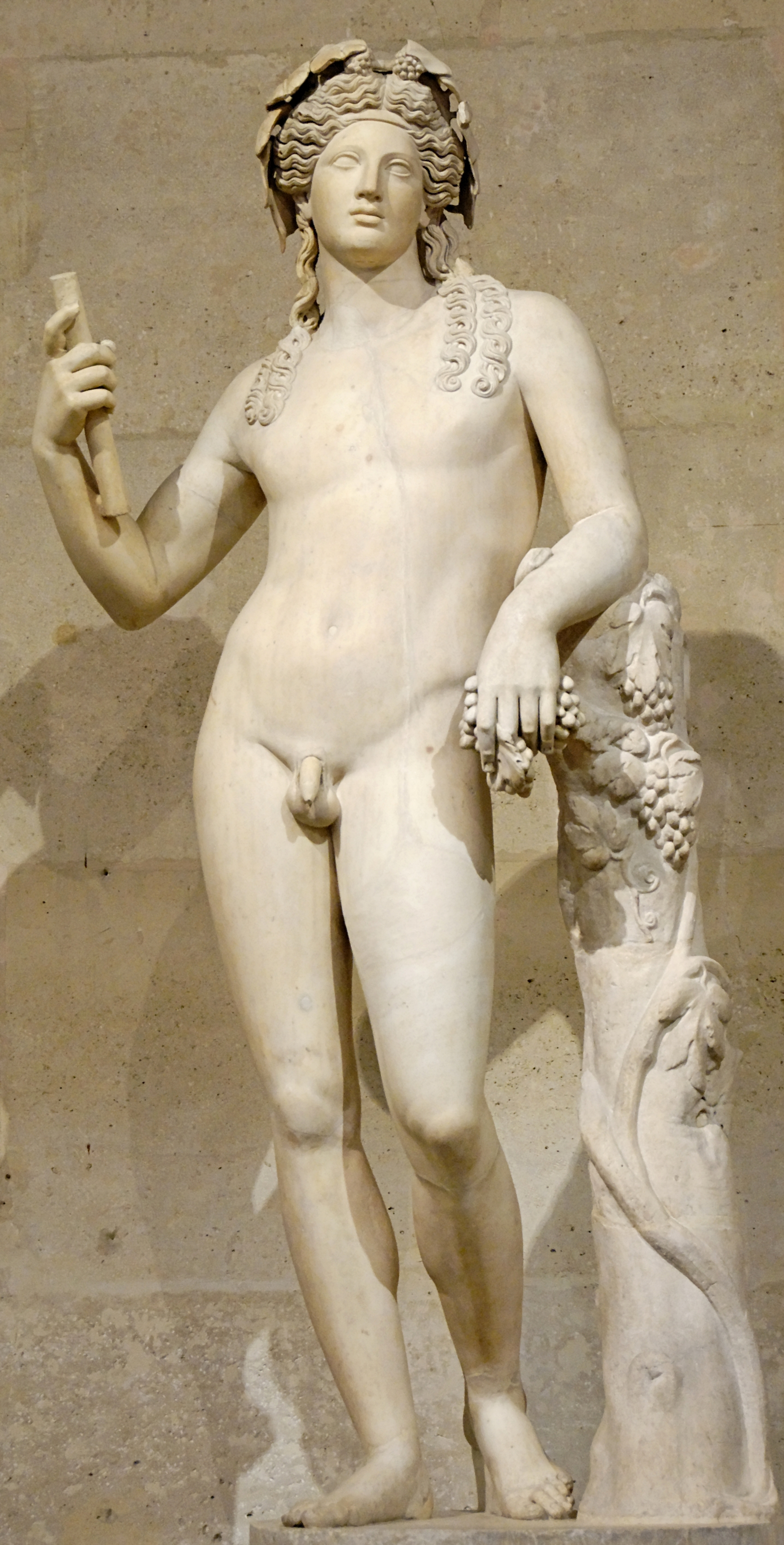
The Richelieu Bacchus continued to be admired by neoclassical artists, (Louvre Museum)

Richelieu is also notable for the authoritarian measures he employed to maintain power. He censored the press, established a large network of internal spies, forbade the discussion of political matters in public assemblies such as the Parlement de Paris (a court of justice), and had those who dared to conspire against him prosecuted and executed. The Canadian political philosopher John Ralston Saul has referred to Richelieu as the "father of the modern nation-state, modern centralised power [and] the modern secret service."

His legacy is also important for the world at large; his ideas of a strong nation-state and aggressive foreign policy helped create the modern system of international politics. As a statesman and churchman, Richelieu played an important role in shaping France's prominence in the 17th century and influencing the secularization of international policies during the Thirty Years' War.

His pioneering approach to French diplomatic relations using raison d'etat vis-a-vis the power relationship at play were first frowned upon but later emulated by other European nation-states to add to their diplomatic strategic arsenal.

A less renowned aspect of his legacy is his involvement with Samuel de Champlain and the fledgling colony along the St. Lawrence River. The retention and promotion of Canada under Richelieu allowed it – and through the settlement's strategic location, the St. Lawrence-Great Lakes gateway into the North American interior – to develop into a French empire in North America, parts of which eventually became modern Canada and Louisiana.

Richelieu is known as the inventor of the table knife. Annoyed by the bad manners that were commonly displayed at the dining table by users of sharp knives (who would often use them to pick their teeth), in 1637 Richelieu ordered that all of the knives on his dining table have their blades dulled and their tips rounded. The design quickly became popular throughout France and later spread to other countries.

== Portrayals in fiction ==
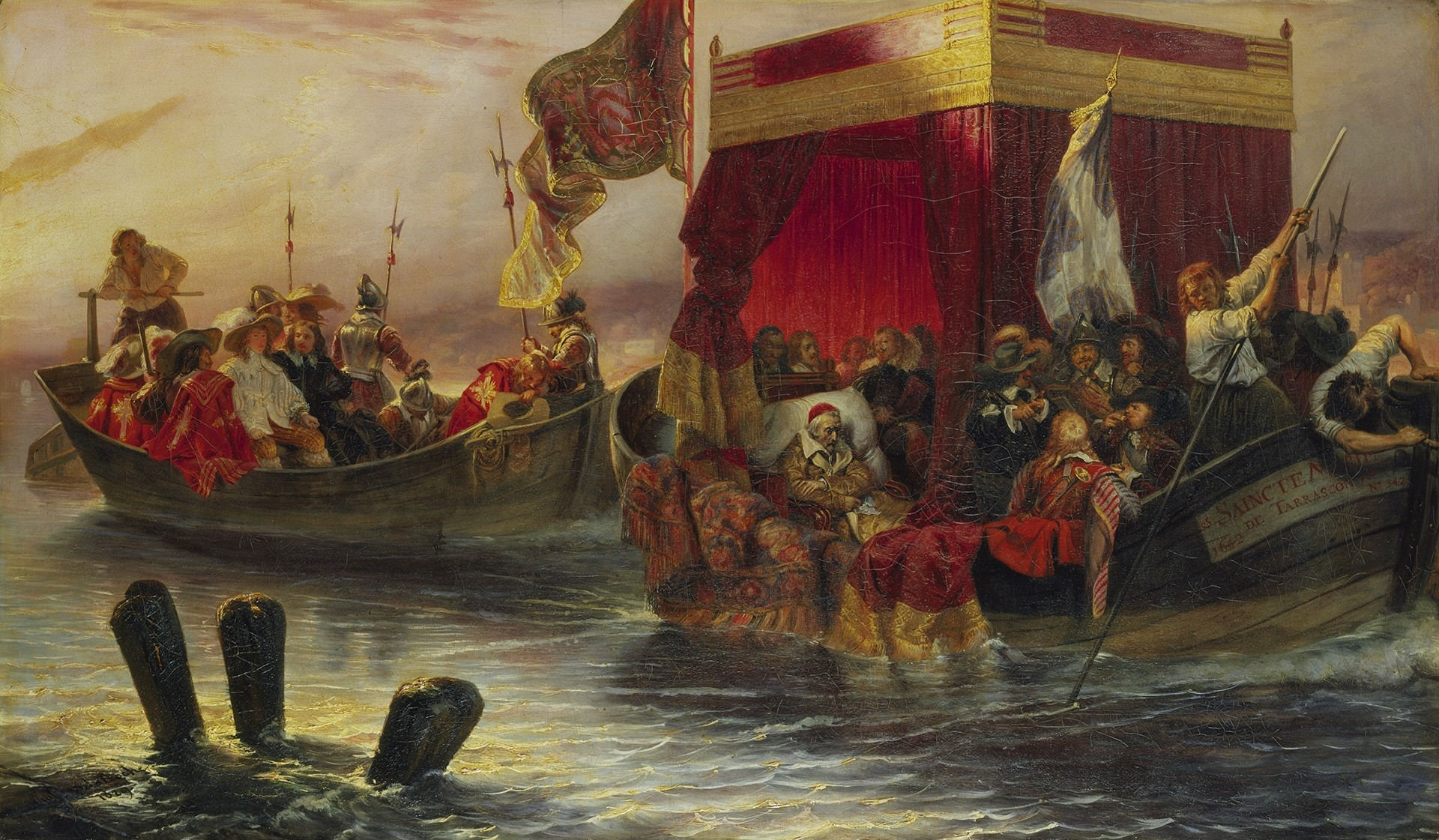
The State Barge of Cardinal Richelieu on the Rhône by Paul Delaroche, 1829

As of April 2013, the Internet Movie Database listed 94 films and television programs in which Cardinal Richelieu is a character. Actors who have portrayed Cardinal Richelieu on film and television include Nigel De Brulier (who played the role in four different films), George Arliss, Miles Mander, Vincent Price, Charlton Heston, Aleksandr Trofimov, Tcheky Karyo, Stephen Rea, Tim Curry, Christoph Waltz and Peter Capaldi.

Richelieu is one of the clergymen more frequently portrayed in film, notably as the lead villain in Alexandre Dumas's 1844 novel The Three Musketeers and its numerous film adaptations. He is usually portrayed as a sinister character, but the 1950 Cyrano de Bergerac shows Richelieu (played by Edgar Barrier in a scene not from Rostand's original verse drama) as compassionate to Cyrano's financial plight, and playfully having enjoyed the duel at the theatre.

Richelieu is indirectly mentioned in a famous line of Alessandro Manzoni's novel The Betrothed (1827–1840), set in 1628, as a Lombard peasant expresses his own conspiracy theories about the bread riots happening in Milan. The 1839 play Richelieu; Or the Conspiracy by Edward Bulwer-Lytton portrayed Richelieu uttering the now famous line "The pen is mightier than the sword." The play was adapted into the 1935 film Cardinal Richelieu.

Richelieu and Louis XIII are depicted in Ken Russell's 1971 film The Devils. The Monty Python's Flying Circus episode "How to Recognise Different Types of Trees from Quite a Long Way Away", first released in 1969, features the sketch "Court Scene with Cardinal Richelieu", in which Richelieu (played by Michael Palin) possesses the casual and somewhat smarmy demeanor of a master of ceremonies. Richelieu is a minor and eventually a major character in the Fortune de France novel series (published between 1977 and 2003) by Robert Merle. Also, in the 21st century 1632/Ring of Fire alternative history series by Eric Flint, he is one of the primary antagonists to the nascent United States of Europe.

== Literary works ==
- Political Testament
- The principal points of the faith of the Catholic Church defended (1635)
- Mémoires du cardinal de Richelieu, sur le règne de Louis XIII

== Honours ==
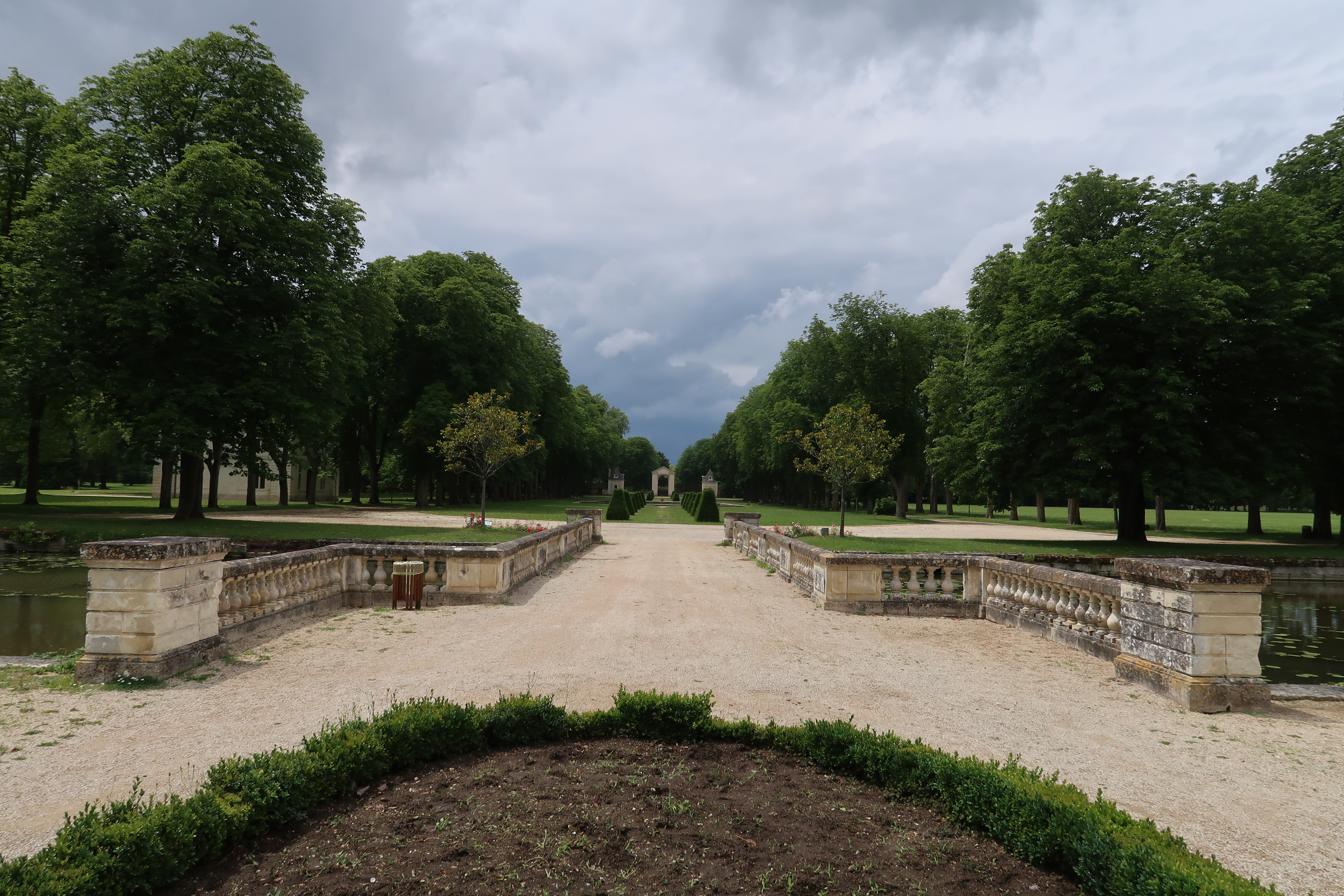
The Parc de Richelieu at Richelieu, Indre-et-Loire

Many sites and landmarks were named to honor Cardinal Richelieu. They include:

- Richelieu, Indre et Loire, a town founded by the cardinal
- Avenue Richelieu, located in Shawinigan, Quebec, Canada
- The provincial electoral district of Richelieu, Quebec
- Richelieu River, in Montérégie, Quebec
- Richelieu Squadron, a squadron of Officer Cadets from the Royal Military College Saint-Jean.
- A wing of the Louvre Museum, Paris, France
- Rue de Richelieu, a Parisian street named in the cardinal's honor, and places located in this street, as the Paris Metro station Richelieu–Drouot, or the historical site of the Bibliothèque nationale de France
- French ship Richelieu, four warships of the French Navy

There is also an ornate style of lace, Richelieu lace, named in honor of the cardinal.

== See also ==
- Chalais conspiracy
- Nicolas Fouquet

== Bibliography ==
- Alexander, Edward Porter. Museums in Motion: an introduction to the history and functions of museums. Lanham: Rowman and Littlefield. (1996)
- Auchincloss, Louis. Richelieu. Viking Press. (1972)
- Bergin, Joseph. The Rise of Richelieu. Manchester: Manchester University Press. (1997)
- Blanchard, Jean-Vincent. Eminence: Cardinal Richelieu and the Rise of France (Walker & Company; 2011) 309 pages; a biography
- Bonnaffé, Edmond. Recherches sur les collections des Richelieu. Plon. (1883) (French)
- Cabanès, Augustin. "Le Médecin de Richelieu – La Maladie du Cardinal" and "L'Odyssée d'un Crane – La Tête du Cardinal", Le cabinet secret de l'histoire Le Cabinet Secret de l'Histoire, 4e serie]. Paris: Dorbon Ainé. (1905) (French)
- Collins, James B. The State in Early Modern France. Cambridge: Cambridge University Press. (1995)
- Dyer, Thomas Henry. The history of modern Europe from the fall of Constantinople: in 1453, to the war in the Crimea, in 1857. J. Murray. (1861)
- Elliott, J. H. Richelieu and Olivares. Cambridge: Canto Press. (1991)
- Fontaine de Resbecq, Eugène de. Les Tombeaux des Richelieu à la Sorbonne, par un membre de la Société d'archéologie de Seine-et-Marne. Paris: Ernest Thorin. (1867) (French)
- Lodge, Sir Richard, and Ketcham, Henry. The life of Cardinal Richelieu Archived 31 March 2020 at the Wayback Machine. A.L. Burt. (1903)
- Munck, Thomas. Seventeenth Century Europe, 1598–1700. London: Macmillan. (1990)
- Pardoe, Julia. The Life of Marie de Medici, volume 3. Colburn (1852); BiblioBazaar reprint (2006)
- Parker, Geoffrey. Europe in Crisis, 1598–1648. London: Fontana. (1984)
- Perkins, James Breck. Richelieu and the Growth of French Power. Ayer Publishing. (1971)
- Phillips, Henry. Church and Culture in Seventeenth Century France. Cambridge: Cambridge University Press. (1997)
- Pitte, Jean-Robert. La Sorbonne au service des humanités: 750 ans de création et de transmission du savoir, 1257–2007. Paris: Presses Paris Sorbonne. (2007) (French)
- Treasure, Geoffrey. Richelieu and Mazarin. London: Routledge. (1998)
- Trevor-Roper, Hugh Redwald. Europe's physician: the various life of Sir Theodore de Mayerne. Yale: Yale University Press. (2006) ISBN 978-0-300-11263-4
- Wedgwood, C. V. The Thirty Years' War. London: Methuen. (1981)
- Zagorin, Perez. Rebels and Rulers, 1500–1660. Volume II: Provincial rebellion: Revolutionary civil wars, 1560–1660. Cambridge: Cambridge University Press. (1992)

Catholic Church titles
Preceded by François Yver	Bishop of Luçon; 1605–1624	Succeeded by Emery de Bragelongne
Vacant	Coadjutor Abbot of Cluny; 1627–1635	Succeeded by Himself as Territorial Abbot
Preceded by Jacques de Veny d'Arbouze	Abbot of Cluny; 1635–1642	Succeeded by Armand de Bourbon
Political offices
Preceded by Claude Mangot	Secretary of State for Foreign Affairs; 1616–1617	Succeeded by Pierre Brûlart
Preceded by Claude Mangot	Secretary of State for War; 1616–1617	Succeeded by Pierre Brûlart
Vacant Title last held by Concino Concini as informal chief minister	Chief Minister of State; 1624–1642	Succeeded by Jules Mazarin
Preceded by Henri de Montmorency	Grand Master, Chief and General Superintendent of Navigation and Commerce of France; 1626–1642	Succeeded by Jean Armand de Maillé
Preceded by Pons de Lauzières-Thémines	Governor of Brittany; 1632–1642	Succeeded by Queen Anne
French nobility
New creation	Duke of Richelieu; 1629–1642	Succeeded by Armand-Jean de Vignerot du Plessis
Preceded by François III d'Orléans	Duke of Fronsac; 1634–1642	Succeeded by Jean Armand de Maillé
