= Triple Portrait of Charles, Prince of Wales =

2000 painting by Susan Crawford

Triple Portrait of Charles, Prince of Wales, 2000, Susan Crawford

The Triple Portrait of Charles, Prince of Wales is a 2000 painting by Susan Crawford showing Charles, Prince of Wales (later Charles III). The work is inspired by Antony van Dyck's Triple Portrait of Charles I from the 1630s, based on which a bust of him was produced. Crawford's portrait depicts Charles in a brown jumper and jacket and a blue open neck shirt in three different positions. The portrait was commissioned by the then-Prince of Wales for his grandmother Queen Elizabeth the Queen Mother on the occasion of her hundredth birthday in 2000.

== See also ==
- Charles I in Three Positions
- Triple Portrait of Henrietta Maria
- Triple Portrait of Diana, Princess of Wales
