= Triple Portrait of Diana, Princess of Wales =

1987 painting by John Ralph Merton

- Artist: John Ralph Merton
- Year: 1987
- Type: Portrait
- Medium: Oil on canvas
- Dimensions: 119 cm × 119 cm (47 in × 47 in)
- Location: City Hall, Cardiff

The Triple Portrait of Diana, Princess of Wales or Princess Diana: A Triple Portrait is a 1987 portrait by the English artist John Ralph Merton depicting Diana, Princess of Wales in three positions. The work is an emulation of artist Antony van Dyck's Triple Portrait of Charles I from the 1630s, based on which a bust of him was produced. In addition to the resemblance to van Dyck's portrait, Merton drew inspiration from his own earlier work, particularly a 1948 triple face painting he had completed of socialite Mrs. Daphne Wall which was displayed at the Royal Academy Summer Exhibition.

Diana sat for the artist five times between 1985 and 1986, once at Kensington Palace and four more times at his studio near Marlborough, Wiltshire. Merton later stated "She is undoubtedly the most beautiful woman I have ever painted". The painting was unveiled at the City Hall in Cardiff in 1987.

== See also ==
- Charles I in Three Positions
- Triple Portrait of Henrietta Maria
- Triple Portrait of Charles, Prince of Wales
