= Bust of Costanza Bonarelli =

Sculpture by Gianlorenzo Bernini

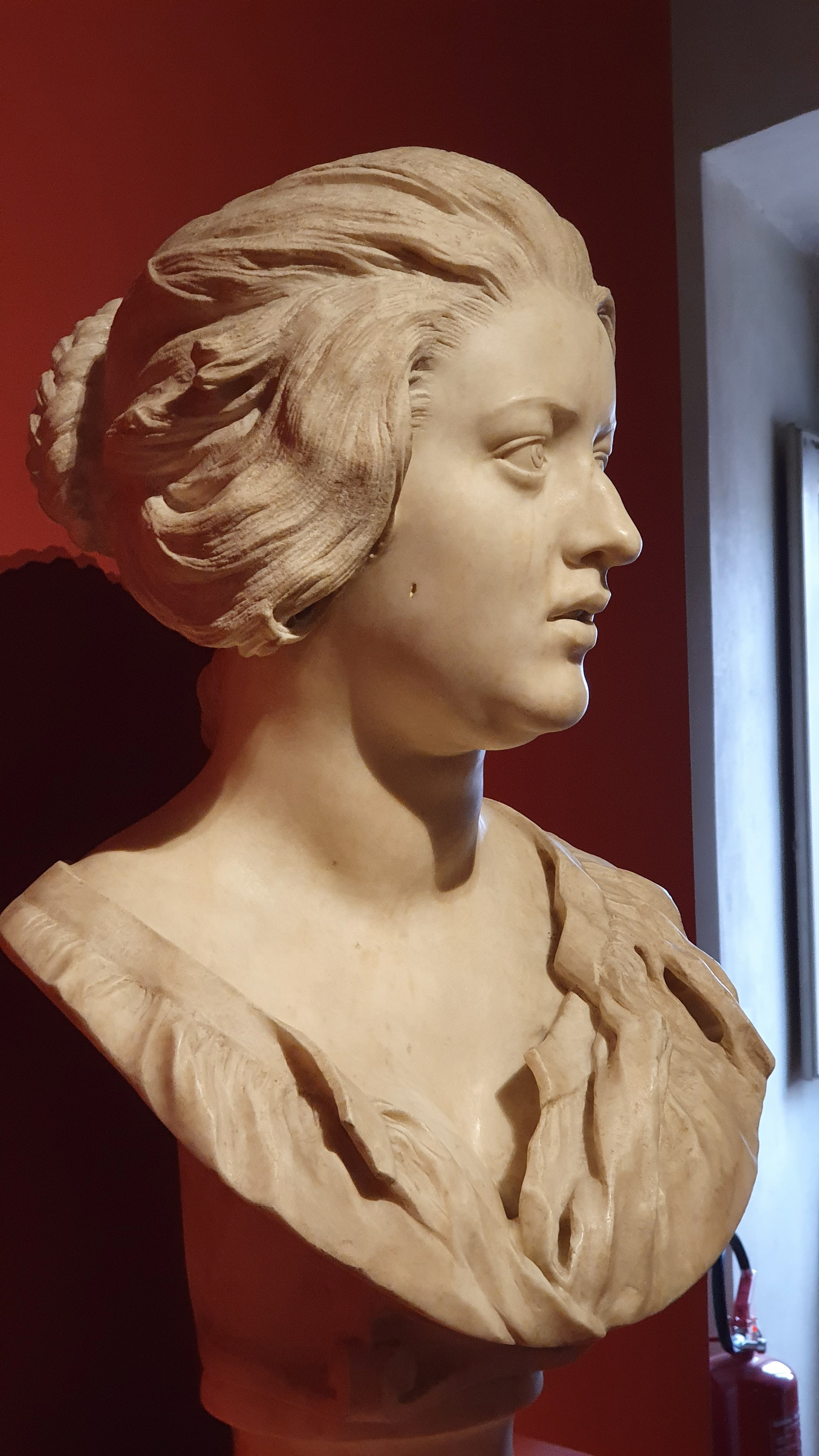
- Artist: Gian Lorenzo Bernini
- Year: c. 1636–1637
- Catalogue: 35
- Type: Sculpture
- Medium: Marble
- Dimensions: 72 cm (28 in)
- Location: Museo Nazionale del Bargello; Florence; 43°46′13.34″N 11°15′30.06″E
- Preceded by: Pasce Oves Meas
- Followed by: Busts of Paolo Giordano and Isabella Orsini

The Bust of Costanza Bonarelli is a marble sculpture created by Gian Lorenzo Bernini during the 1630's. The piece is now in the Museo Nazionale del Bargello in Florence, Italy. Considered among the most personal of Bernini's works, the bust is of Costanza Piccolomini Bonarelli, the wife of Matteo Bonarelli, who was one of Bernini's disciples and colleagues.

== Subject ==
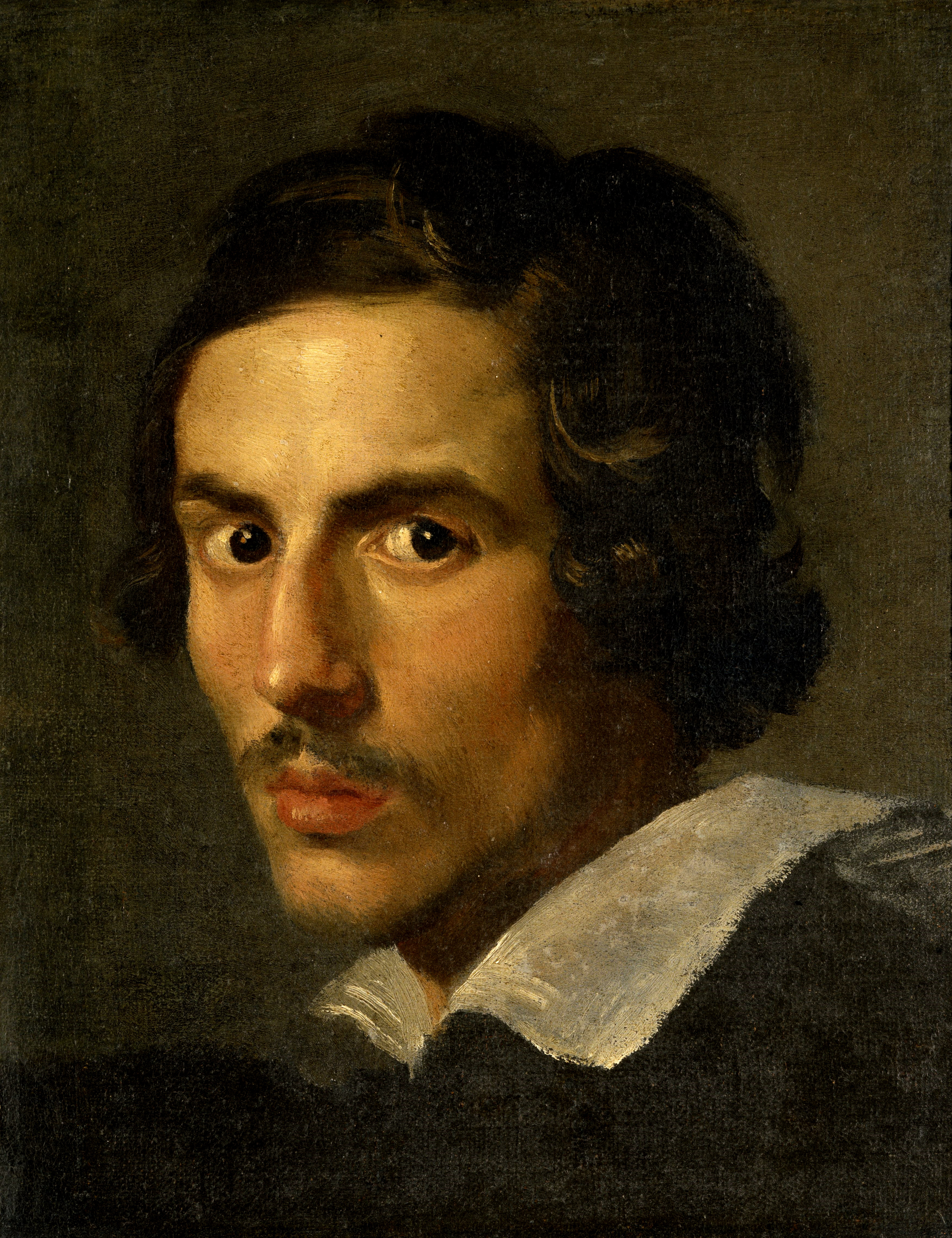
Gian Lorenzo Bernini

The subject of the work is Costanza Bonarelli, with whom he fell in love when her husband was working as Bernini's assistant in 1636. During his encounters with Bonarelli, Bernini decided to spend some of his free time stalking her. Later, Bernini discovered his brother, Luigi, had also been having an affair with Costanza. With the frustration that Luigi has shown against Bonarelli during the feud, it created tension and led to Bernini assaulting his brother. Bernini then decided to barge into the home of his brother and attempt to assault and murder him; the assault involved one of his servants attacking Luigi with a knife and a blunt object. Bernini was also known to hold a sword during the attack where he willingly used it to strike his brother down.

Later on, Bernini was punished and was fined three-thousand scudi for attempted homicide against his brother during the affair; Pope Urban VIII eventually released him from his fines due to his reputation with the church and the relationship with the pope. Years after the affair, and after a conversation with the pope, Bernini decided to move on from Costanza Bonarelli and marry another woman named Caterina Tezio instead; he made sure he would commit to his work, as well as his family and faith for the remainder of his years as an artist.

== Style ==
=== Clothing ===
The Bust of Costanza Bonarelli was an artwork that introduced numerous elements from the Baroque style; the bust feels light weighted, and the hair and clothing exude a presence of energy and life. Bernini managed to portray some good qualities in creating the bust, such as adding the clothed drapery on the subject. Other than The Bust of Costanza Bonarelli that was created, Bernini has incorporated similar drapery work to several other sculptures as well.

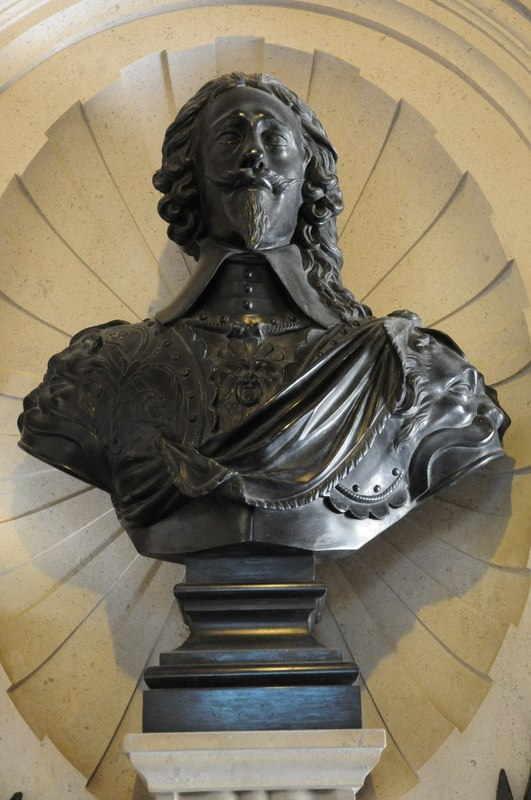
This bust was made to commemorate King Charles I

One example that has a similar emphasis towards drapery work would be The Bust of Charles. The Bust of Charles was another sculpture that not only emphasized drapery work, but the drapery also had more detail within the folds as well. The arrangement of this bust's clothing seems to give the subject more life, making the figure of the bust look more realistic.

=== Expression ===
Another aspect that Bernini has included in the Bust of Costanza Bonarelli, is the emotions evident on the face. The details within the sculpture were well developed and included multiple incisions and cuts in order to add accuracy and detail to the sculpture piece, such as folds and frills within the clothing or hair within the bust of the person. With these details added, Bernini was able to shape the facial expression of Costanza; the features that the bust has, as well as the light and darkness the statue has produced within the work, the appearance within the artwork suggests that Bernini stays true to the figure as well as an accurate representation of the figure. As Bernini put more details into the facial expression, he gave Costanza a slightly opened lip within the emotion of the sculpture's face, representing the realism within the piece, as well as how it shows the head bust exemplifying the feeling of the subject of the work.

=== Contrast ===
Most of Bernini's busts had religious themes. The Bust of Costanza Bonarelli was not related to Church patronage, but instead represents someone Bernini remembered from his past; this person was related to his personal life outside his work, as well as a woman he once loved. This sculpture was also not commissioned by anyone, but was created as his own personal work instead. This is what makes this bust different compared to other busts Bernini has created; the busts he would create would normally involve important figures of high class or other important people.

== Context ==
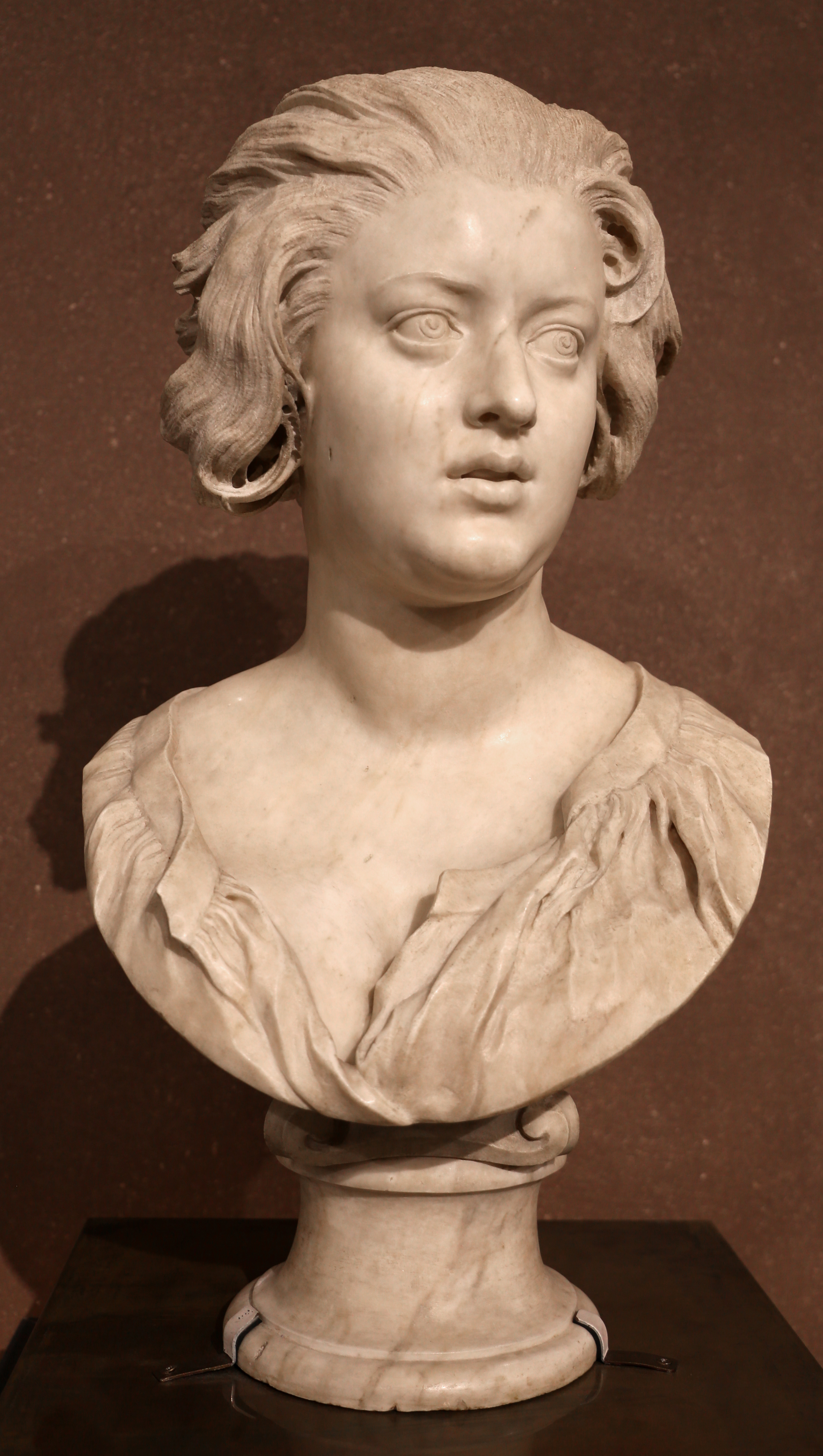
Another angle of Costanza Bonarelli

=== Memory ===
Looking back at Bernini's Bust of Costanza Bonarelli, Bernini had a direction in making this particular artwork. The bust created by Bernini was made in order to remember Costanza Bonarelli, a woman he had once loved, as well as preserving that specific person in a moment of time. The Bust of Costanza Bonarelli was made as a personal artwork, rather than a commission from someone else.

== See also ==
- List of works by Gian Lorenzo Bernini
