= Triple Portrait of Henrietta Maria =

1638 paintings by Anthony van Dyck

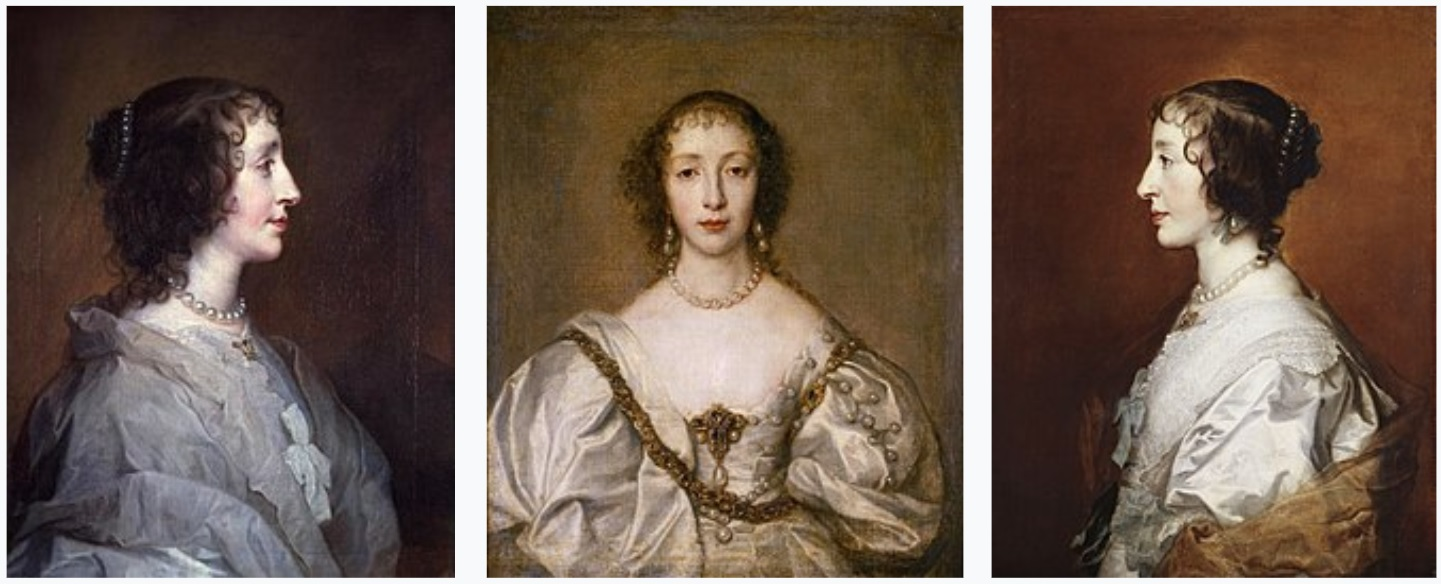
Reconstruction of the portrait, showing the profile from Memphis on the left.

The Triple Portrait of Henrietta Maria is a 1638 painting by Anthony van Dyck depicting Henrietta Maria of France, wife of Charles I of England. Charles I had previously commissioned van Dyck to produce a triple portrait of himself, which was sent to Italy so that Gian Lorenzo Bernini could create a sculpted bust. Following reception of the completed bust, Henrietta Maria commissioned Bernini to produce a bust of herself and subsequently asked van Dyck to create a comparable triple portrait for use in the same process, which was ultimately never fulfilled.

In the surviving version of the work, the left-facing profile and full-frontal view are held in the Royal Collection. The right-facing profile is generally identified—albeit not definitively—as the portrait of Henrietta Maria now in the collection of the Memphis Brooks Museum of Art.

== See also ==
- List of paintings by Anthony van Dyck
- Charles I in Three Positions
- Triple Portrait of Charles, Prince of Wales
- Triple Portrait of Diana, Princess of Wales

== Bibliography ==
- Gian Pietro Bellori, Vite de' pittori, scultori e architecti moderni, Torino, Einaudi, 1976.
- Didier Bodart, Van Dyck, Prato, Giunti, 1997.
- Justus Müller Hofstede, Van Dyck, Milano, Rizzoli/Skira, 2004.
