= Bust of Thomas Baker =

Sculpture by Gian Lorenzo Bernini

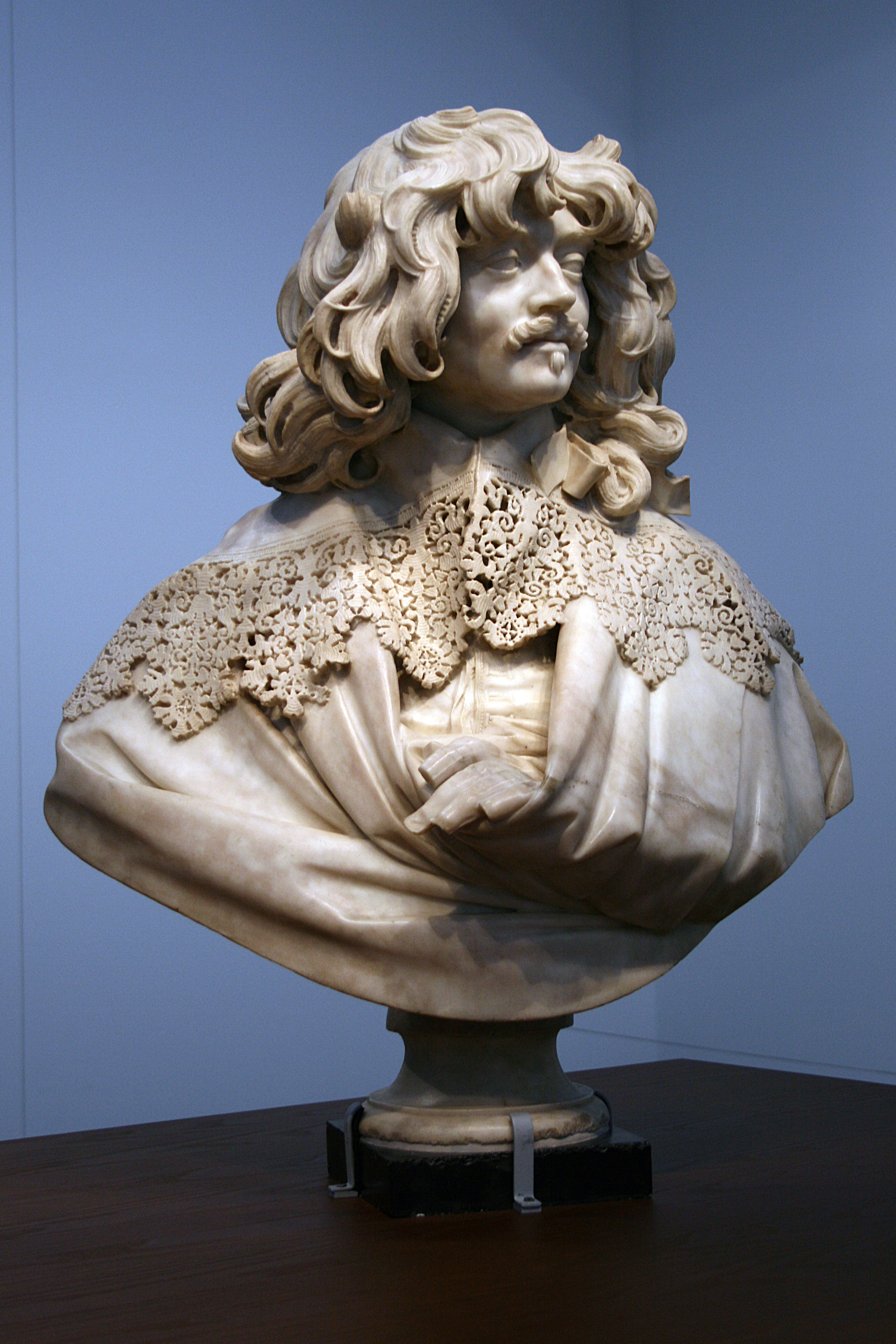
- Artist: Gian Lorenzo Bernini
- Year: 1638
- Catalogue: 40
- Type: Sculpture
- Medium: Marble
- Dimensions: 82 cm (32 in)
- Location: Victoria and Albert Museum, London; 51.496302°N 0.172078°W
- Preceded by: Bust of King Charles I (Bernini)
- Followed by: Medusa (Bernini)

The bust of Thomas Baker is a 1638 marble portrait bust created by the Italian artist Gian Lorenzo Bernini, with much of the bust undertaken by a pupil of Bernini, probably Andrea Bolgi. It is now in the Victoria and Albert Museum, London, who purchased the bust in 1921 for 1480 English guineas.

The V&A regard the drapery as all or mostly by Bolgi, but the flesh areas as by Bernini himself.

== Subject ==
Baker (1606–58) was High Sheriff of Suffolk in 1657 and connected to the court of Charles I. He seems to have been involved in another Bernini bust, carrying the triple portrait of Charles I by van Dyck to Rome; it was from this portrait that Bernini carved the now-destroyed bust of King Charles.

A conversation with Bernini is recorded by the English sculptor Nicholas Stone Junior, in which Bernini said that the commission was a private one for Baker, who paid more than the pope had for the bust of Charles. Bernini undertook it to show the English the quality of his work from a live model. The commission annoyed the pope, who took steps to thwart it; the bust may have been completed discreetly.

== See also ==
- List of works by Gian Lorenzo Bernini
