= Andrea Bolgi =

Italian sculptor

- Born: 1605; Carrara
- Died: 1656 (aged 50–51); Naples
- Education: Florence
- Known for: Sculpture
- Notable work: Saint Helena, St. Peter's Basilica
- Movement: Baroque
- Patrons: Pope Urban VIII; Pope Innocent X Giovan Camillo Cacace

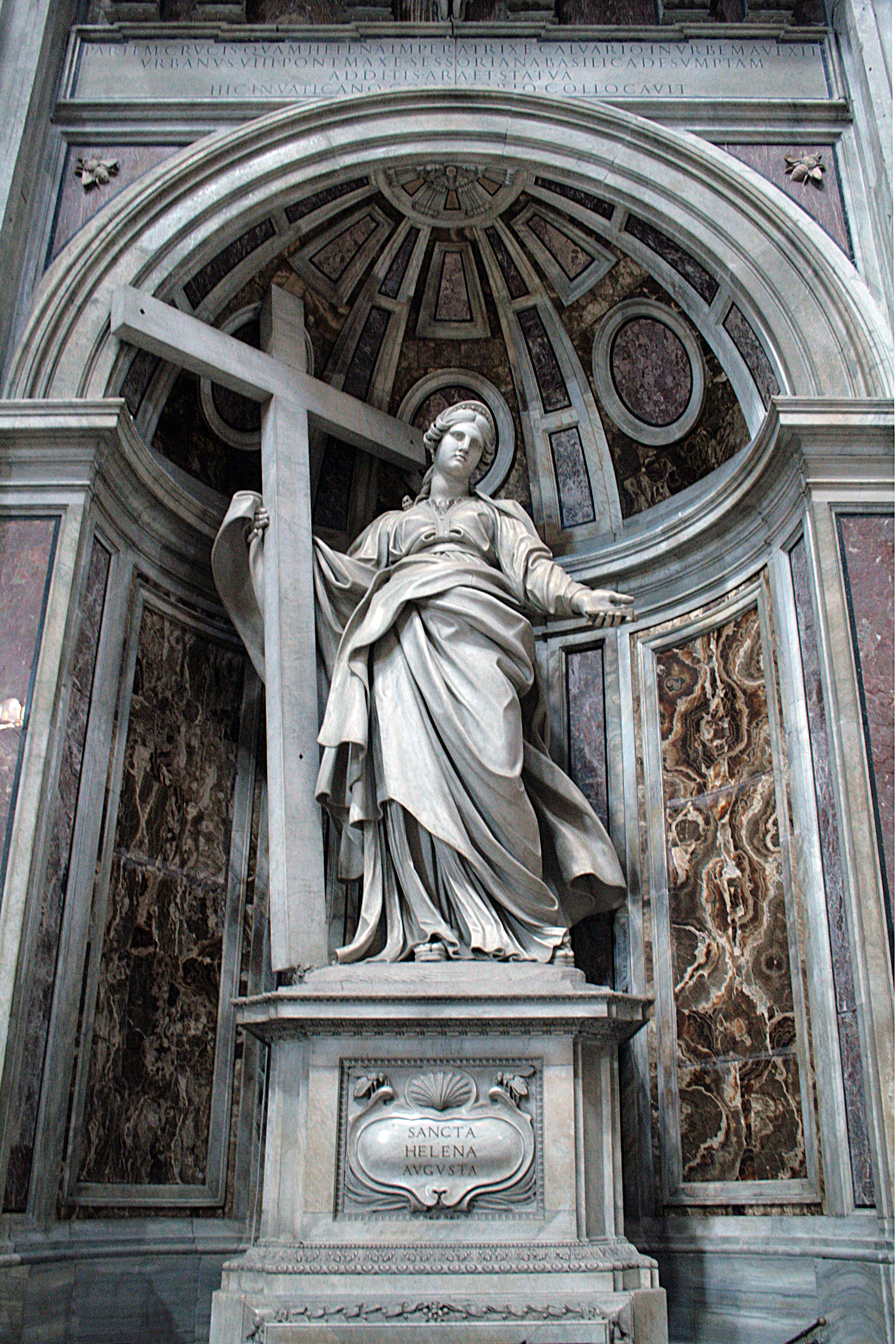
The classically balanced Saint Helena in the crossing of St. Peter's Basilica, Rome

Andrea Bolgi (22 June 1605 – 1656) was an Italian sculptor responsible for several statues in St. Peter's Basilica, Rome. Towards the end of his life he moved to Naples, where he sculpted portrait busts. He died in Naples during a plague epidemic.

== Early life ==
Bolgi was born in the marble-working city of Carrara. His training was in Florence, which was a conservative center in the seventeenth century.

In 1626, along with Francesco Baratta, he was sent to Rome, where he joined the studio of sculptors employed by Gian Lorenzo Bernini, who were influenced by Bernini's Baroque style. From 1626, before the expansion of Bernini's atélier, Bolgi supplanted Giuliano Finelli (1601–1653) as the "only man of consequence" in Bernini's studio, Rudolph Wittkower observed, in attributing to Bolgi the Bust of Thomas Baker begun by Bernini, now at the Victoria and Albert Museum.

== St. Peter's ==
Bolgi created his Saint Helena (1629–1639) for one of the niches at the crossing of St. Peter's Basilica, one of the choice commissions of his generation, for which he had doubtless been promoted by Bernini in preference to Finelli. Bolgi laboured for a decade on the figure that epitomised his career and, in some degree, his detraction: Wittkower remarked on its "classicizing coolness, its boring precision", and its position directly across from Bernini's masterful Saint Longinus invited unflattering comparisons.

Between 1647 and 1650 all the spandrel spaces above the arches of the nave of St. Peter's were filled with stucco figures. Their execution was divided among sculptors with connections with Bernini, who seems to have exercised loose control over the compositions. In the first bay on the left, the spandrel figures of The Church and Divine Justice were given to Bolgi, who was paid for them in September 1647 and in March 1648. Pope Innocent X was dissatisfied with Bolgi's figures, which were taken down, adjusted to everyone's satisfaction, and reinstalled.

== Naples ==
After 1650 Bolgi moved to Naples, where he was noted for his portrait busts. He was called to Naples by Giovan Camillo Cacace, a lawyer and member of the Accademia degli Oziosi. For this client Bolgi created two sculptures in the Cacace family chapel in San Lorenzo Maggiore. The kneeling figures are Giuseppe and Vittoria De Caro. Iconographically they derive from the scheme of the statue of Fabrizio Pignatelli by Michelangelo Naccherino. The movement and whirling of the cloths is a clear step forward in the development of the Baroque language, until then not known to the Neapolitan public. Beneath the sculptures are busts of Francesco De Caro and Giovan Camillo Cacace. The latter is renowned for its vivid portrayal of the client.

== Main works ==
- 1629–1639: Statue of Saint Helena in St. Peter's Basilica, Rome
- 1634–1648: Other small works in St. Peter's
  - 1637: Bust of Laura Frangipani, signed and dated (San Francesco a Ripa, Rome)
  - Half-length figures in the Raimondi Chapel (San Pietro in Montorio, Rome)
- 1653: Statues and busts in the Cacace chapel, signed and dated, in San Lorenzo Maggiore, Naples
- 1653: Candelabra in bronze, in the church of Santi Apostoli, Naples
