= Fountain of Neptune, Naples =

Fountain of Neptune
- Fontana del Nettuno (Italian)
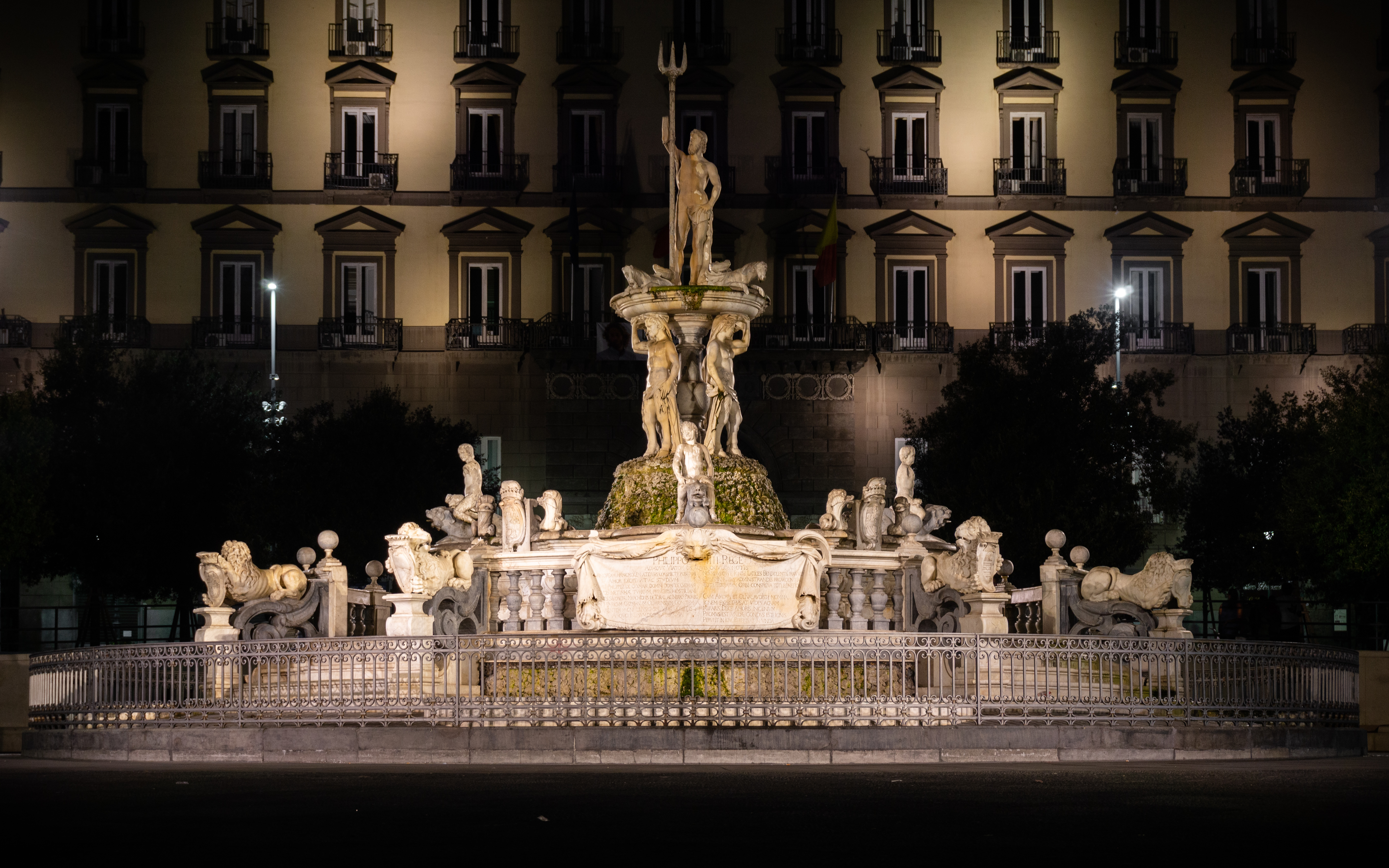
- Fountain of Neptune.
- Artist: Domenico Fontana, Michelangelo Naccherino, Angelo Landi and Pietro Bernini
- Year: 1600
- Medium: Marble
- Location: Naples; 40.84079°N 14.252425°E

The Fountain of Neptune (Italian: Fontana del Nettuno) is a monumental fountain, located in Municipio square, in Naples, Italy. The fountain until the end of 2014 was located across the street of via Medina across from the church of Santa Maria Incoronata, Naples and a few doors south of the church complex of Pieta di Turchini. Now the fountain is located in front of the Town hill building, its location changed due to the construction of the new underground station (Municipio Station - Line 1).

== History ==
Its construction dates back to the period of Spanish Viceroyalty of Enrique de Guzman, Count of Olivares. It was built by Giovanni Domenico D'Auria using a design by the Swiss architect Domenico Fontana (born: 1543, Melide, Switzerland), between 1600 and 1601. Also involved in its completion were the sculptor-architects Michelangelo Naccherino, Pietro Bernini, and Cosimo Fanzago.

The fountain originally stood near the Arsenal in the port. In 1629, it was transported to Largo di Palazzo (now Piazza del Plebiscito), near the Royal Palace of Naples, but since it hindered the festivals held in the plaza there, the fountain was again moved to Borgo Santa Lucia, near Castel dell'Ovo. There, more statues, these by Fanzago were added. In 1638, it was again moved, this time to Largo delle Corregge, today Via Medina. During the revolt of Masaniello in 1647, the statue was damaged. Further damage occurred during the sacking of Naples in 1672 by the Viceroy Pedro Antonio de Aragón. In 1675, it underwent restoration and was moved to the Molo Grande.

This migratory fountain has continued to move through Naples: in 1886, it was dismantled, to reappear two years later in the Piazza Plaza della Borsa (now Plaza Giovanni Bovio), where it stood till 2000, when it was returned to Via Medina to allow for work on the Naples Metro.

== Description ==
The fountain is circular and surrounded by a balustrade. Water flows from four lions who hold shields with the symbols of Medina y de Carafa. Two sea monsters pour water in the central shell, adorned with dolphins and Tritons that also emit water; this was carved by Pietro Bernini. In the center, on a rock, two nymphs and two satyrs hold up a saucer that features a statue of Neptune with trident; this portion was sculpted by Naccherino.

== Chronology of displacements ==
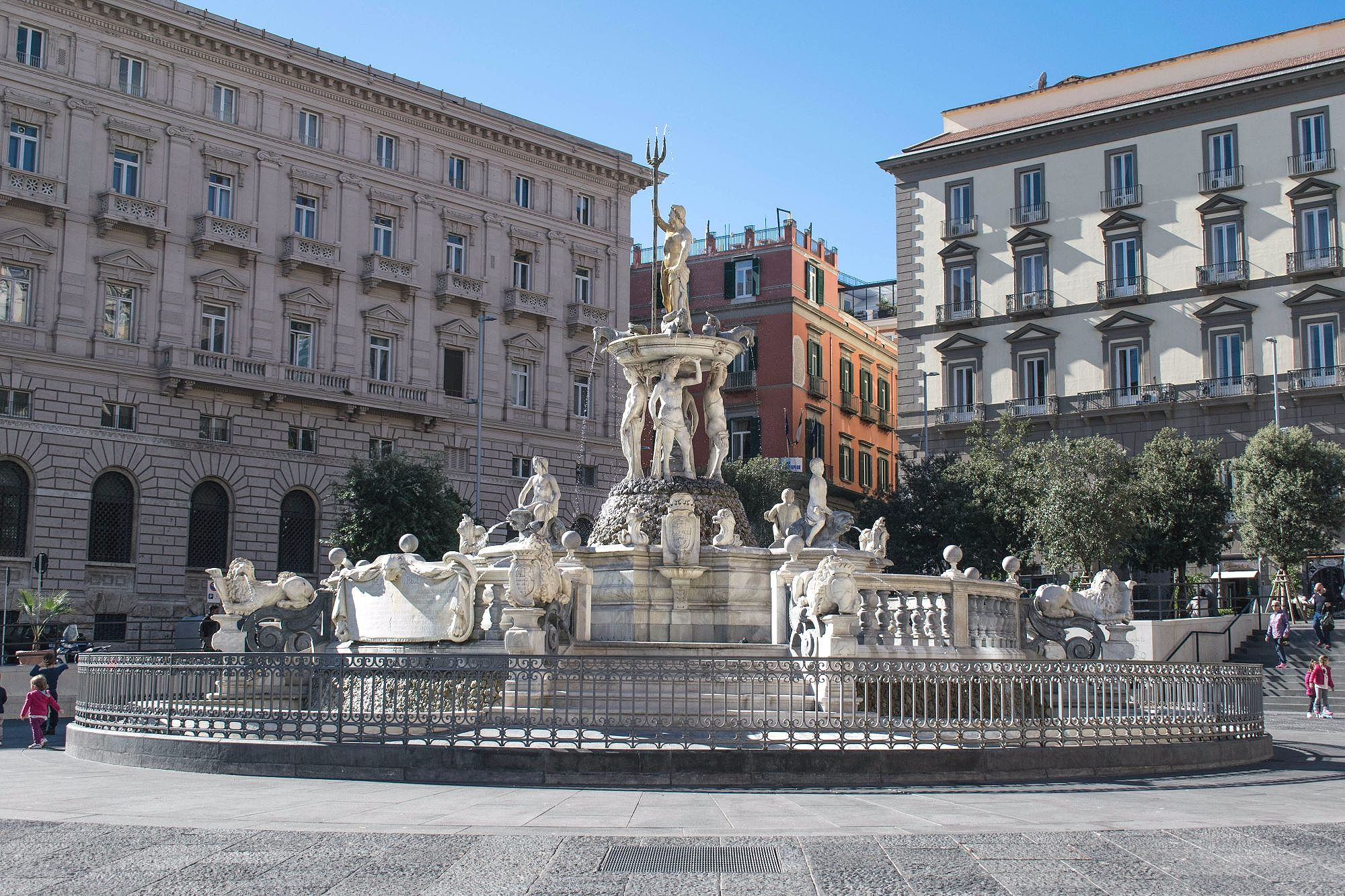
Current location of the fountain in Piazza Municipio.

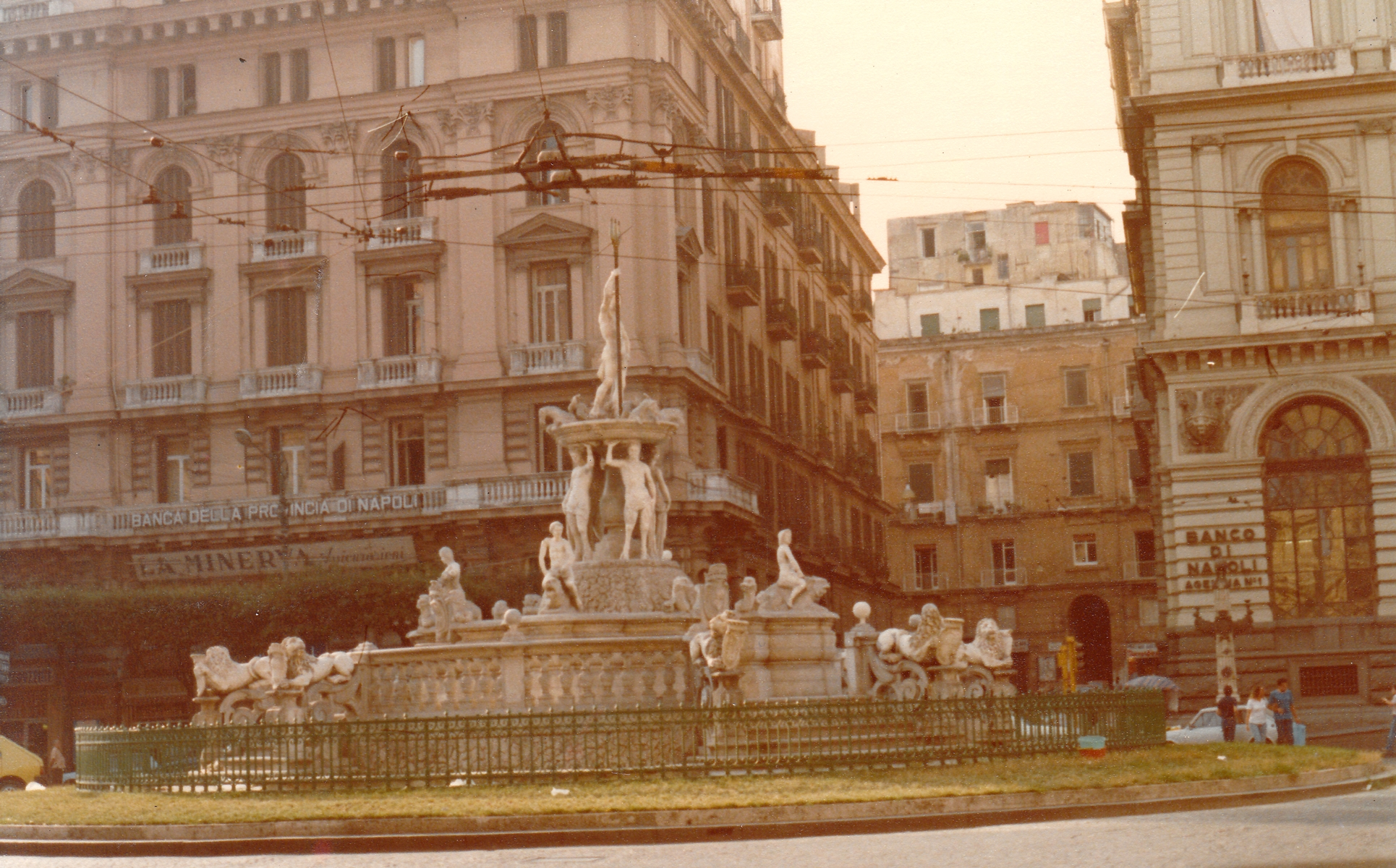
The fountain in Piazza Borsa in 1982.

- 1595–1599: harbour's arsenal
- 1628: Largo di Palazzo (Piazza Plebiscito)
- 1634: Borgo Santa Lucia
- 1639: Via Medina
- 1675: Molo Grande
- 1898: Piazza Borsa (Piazza Giovanni Bovio)
- 2001: Via Medina
- 2015: Piazza Municipio
