= Statue of Pope Urban VIII =

Sculpture by Gianlorenzo Bernini

Memorial Statue of Pope Urban VIII
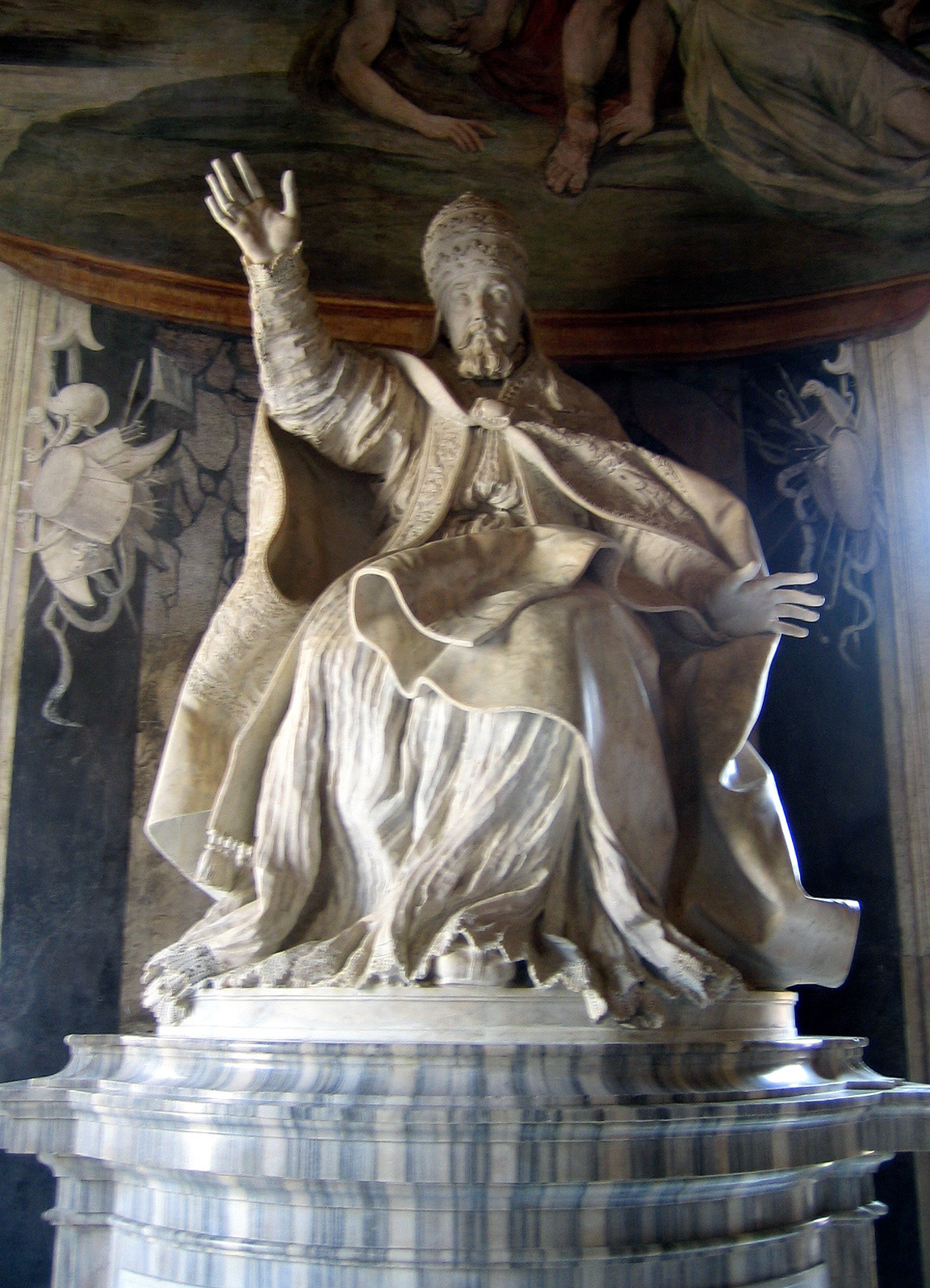
- Artist: Gian Lorenzo Bernini
- Year: 1635-40
- Catalogue: 38
- Type: Sculpture
- Medium: Marble
- Subject: Pope Urban VIII
- Dimensions: Over life-size
- Location: Palazzo dei Conservatori; Rome
- Preceded by: Busts of Paolo Giordano and Isabella Orsini
- Followed by: Bust of King Charles I (Bernini)

The Statue of Urban VIII is a large statue from the late 1630s, of the then pope Urban VIII. It was executed by Gian Lorenzo Bernini and his workshop. The work was commissioned in 1635 and took five years to complete. The piece sits in the Palazzo dei Conservatori in Rome.

== See also ==
- List of works by Gian Lorenzo Bernini
