= Costanza Piccolomini Bonarelli =

Italian noblewoman and merchant

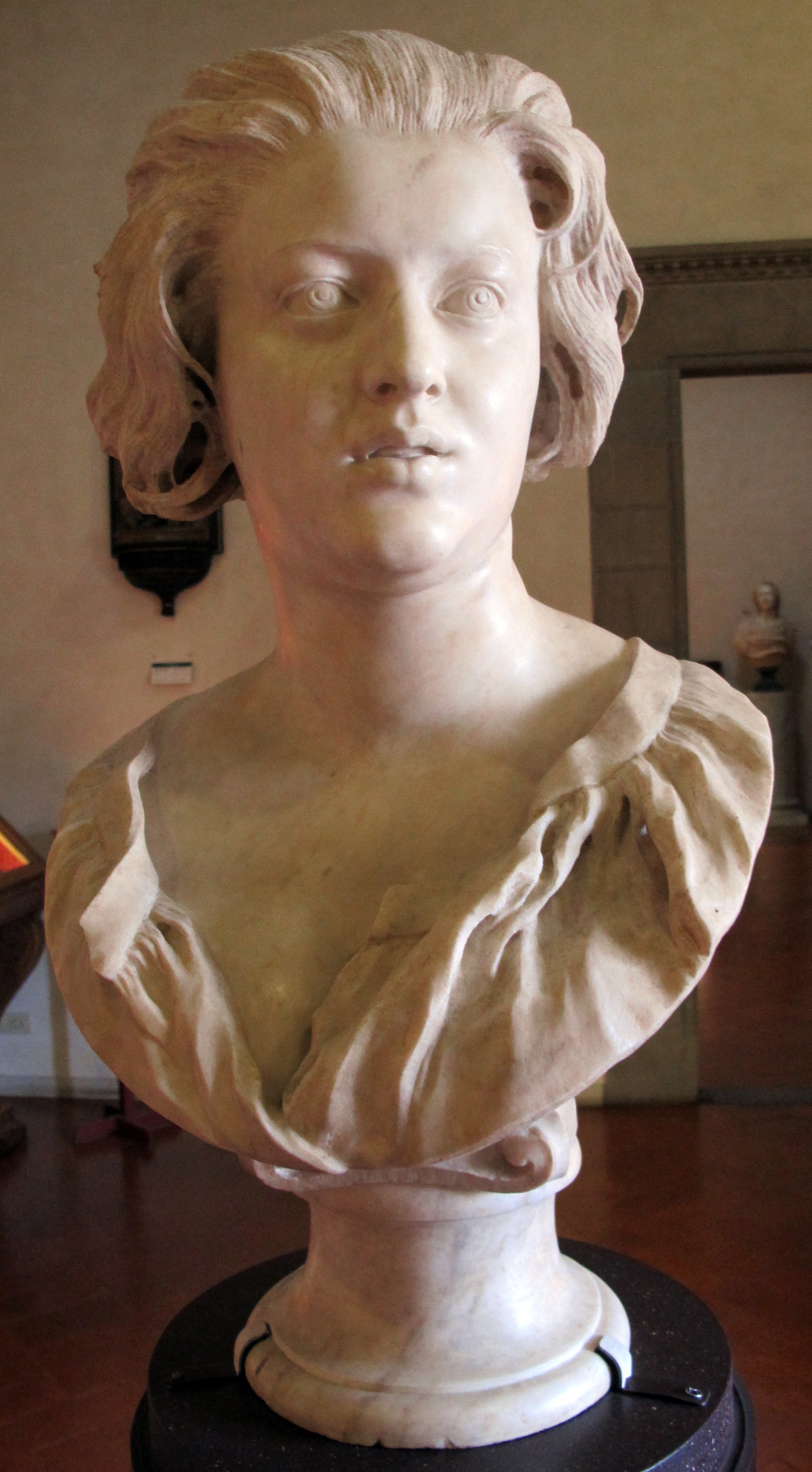
Bust of Costanza Bonarelli by Gian Lorenzo Bernini, c. 1637

Costanza Bonarelli (c. 1614 – 3 December 1662), also known as Costanza Bonucelli or Costanza Piccolomini Bonucelli, was an Italian noblewoman, merchant and art dealer, descended from a Sienese noble family. She was the mistress of the sculptor and architect Gian Lorenzo Bernini, who in the 1630s created a bust of her, now exhibited at the Bargello in Florence.

== Early life and marriage ==
Costanza was born around 1614, daughter of Leonardo Piccolomini, a member of a minor branch of an important Sienese family. The first time she appears in documents is in Rome in 1625, when she was 11 years old and living in what is now Via della Vite with her father and her step-mother Tiberia. Her mother's name is not mentioned in the document or in Costanza's last will, signed around 23 January 1662. In that will she stipulated that all descendants with the last name Piccolomini could inherit her property.

On Assumption Day, 15 August 1628, Costanza received a dowry of 45 scudi (the equivalent of annual rent for a modestly sized house) from the Confraternity of San Rocco, funded by Giambattista Borghese, brother of the late Pope Paul V. In 1630, named as la zitella da Viterbo ('the spinster of Viterbo'), she was promised a second dowry of 26 scudi and 44 baiocchi from the Gonfalone Confraternity. Costanza then married the sculptor, restorer and art dealer Matteo Bonarelli (or Bonucelli) from Lucca, on 16 February 1632 in Rome, in his parish of San Lorenzo in Lucina. On 28 February, the marriage contract was signed between Costanza, her father Leonardo and her husband Matteo. The dowry was fixed at 289 scudi. Costanza was 22 years old and Matteo 28; they settled at the foot of the Quirinal Hill in what is now Vicolo Scanderbeg.

== Relationship with Bernini ==
Matteo Bonareli was employed in Bernini's workshop. In 1636 he was paid for three marble putti for St. Peter's Basilica; the following year, he assisted Bernini with the mausoleum of Countess Matilde in the basilica. Costanza was approximately 22 when Bernini, a bachelor in his late thirties, began an adulterous affair with her. His Bust of Costanza Bonarelli may have been started in 1636; it was finished by October 1637, when Bernini's friend Fulvio Testi described it in a letter as the most beautiful portrait Bernini had ever created. Bernini portrayed Costanza not as a modest, chaste woman but as a passionate lover, with parted lips and wide-open eyes, her chemise falling open in what art historian Simon Schama has called "the sexiest invitation in the history of European sculpture".

In summer 1638, Bernini discovered that Costanza was having an affair with his younger brother Luigi. He attacked Luigi with a crowbar, breaking two of his ribs, and then with a sword; Luigi saved himself by taking sanctuary in the church of Santa Maria Maggiore. Gian Lorenzo then sent a servant to slash Costanza's face with a razor, a traditional punishment for a woman who had offended a man's honour. Costanza was imprisoned for adultery and fornication in the monastery of Casa Pia, the servant was exiled, as was Luigi Bernini to protect him, and Gian Lorenzo Bernini was fined 3,000 scudi. His mother, Angelica Galante Bernini, wrote to Cardinal Francesco Barberini, the nephew of Pope Urban VIII, pleading for help "taming" him. The Pope subsequently pardoned him in view of his impending marriage, but Costanza was not "given back to her husband" until 7 April 1639, after she wrote a pleading letter to the governor of the house.

== Art dealer ==
After returning to her husband, Costanza pursued a successful business as a merchant and art dealer, including during the pontificate of the Sienese Alessandro VII Chigi. Payment orders refer to her as "Signora Costanza", or after her husband's death as "Costanza Piccolomini", and also as "Costanza scultora" ('sculptor'). She exhibited a large collection of artworks on the main floor of her house and in two rooms on the upper floor. One of the most famous was the Plague of Ashdod by Nicolas Poussin, commissioned by the Sicilian nobleman Fabrizio Valguarnera in 1630. In 1665, when Bernini was in Paris, he recognised the painting in the palace of the Duke of Richelieu and suggested that it be hung lower for better viewing. Richelieu sold the painting to King Louis XIV of France the same year, and it is now in the Louvre.

== Last years ==
Matteo Bonarelli died in 1654; in his will, signed in 1649, he designated as his sole heir "Signora Costanza Piccolomini mia dilettissima moglie" ('my most beloved wife'). Costanza subsequently gave birth to a daughter, Olimpia Caterina Piccolomini.

She died on 3 December 1662. She was not buried with her husband in the crypt of their parish of Santi Vincenzo e Anastasio a Trevi, but in the church of Santa Maria Maggiore.

== In media ==
Costanza Piccolomini Bonarelli is the subject of a biography by Sarah McPhee, Bernini's Beloved, published in 2012. A novelised version of her life, Costanza by Rachel Blackmore, was published in 2024.

== Bibliography ==
- Sarah McPhee, Bernini's Beloved: A Portrait of Costanza Piccolomini, New Haven / London: Yale University Press, 2012, ISBN 9780300175271.
- Franco Mormando, tr., The Life of Gian Lorenzo Bernini by Domenico Bernini, University Park: Pennsylvania State University Press, 2011, ISBN 9780271037486.
- Simon Schama, "When stone came to life", The Guardian, 16 September 2006.
