= Pietro Bernini =

Italian sculptor

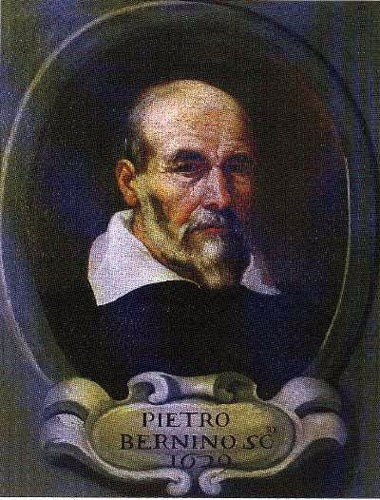
- Portrait of Bernini
- Born: Pietro Bernini; 6 May 1562; Sesto Fiorentino, Duchy of Florence, in present-day Tuscany, Italy
- Died: 29 August 1629 (aged 67); Rome, Papal States, in present-day Italy
- Known for: Sculpture
- Notable work: Fontana della Barcaccia
- Movement: Baroque style

Pietro Bernini (6 May 1562 – 29 August 1629) was an Italian sculptor. He was the father of one of the most famous artists of Baroque, Gian Lorenzo Bernini, as well as the sculptor-architect Luigi Bernini.

== Biography ==
Bernini was born in Sesto Fiorentino, Tuscany. He moved to Naples to work on the Certosa di San Martino there, and Gian Lorenzo was born in Naples in 1598. In 1605 the family moved to Rome under the protection of Cardinal Scipione Borghese. In Rome, he worked on various projects for Pope Paul V, another Borghese, including the Pauline Chapel in the Basilica of Santa Maria Maggiore.

One of Pietro Bernini's best-known contributions to the city of Rome is the Fontana della Barcaccia (Fountain of the Old Boat) which resembles a beached ship and is located at the foot of the Spanish Steps. It was commissioned by Pope Urban VIII and built in 1627. He also contributed to the Fountain of Neptune, Naples, completed between 1600 and 1601.

Initially collaborating with his son (for example on Boy with a Dragon in 1617) but later overshadowed by his talent, the elder Bernini ended his career as an independent sculptor around 1617, evidently happy to act as his son's assistant. He died in Rome, aged 67.

== Gallery ==
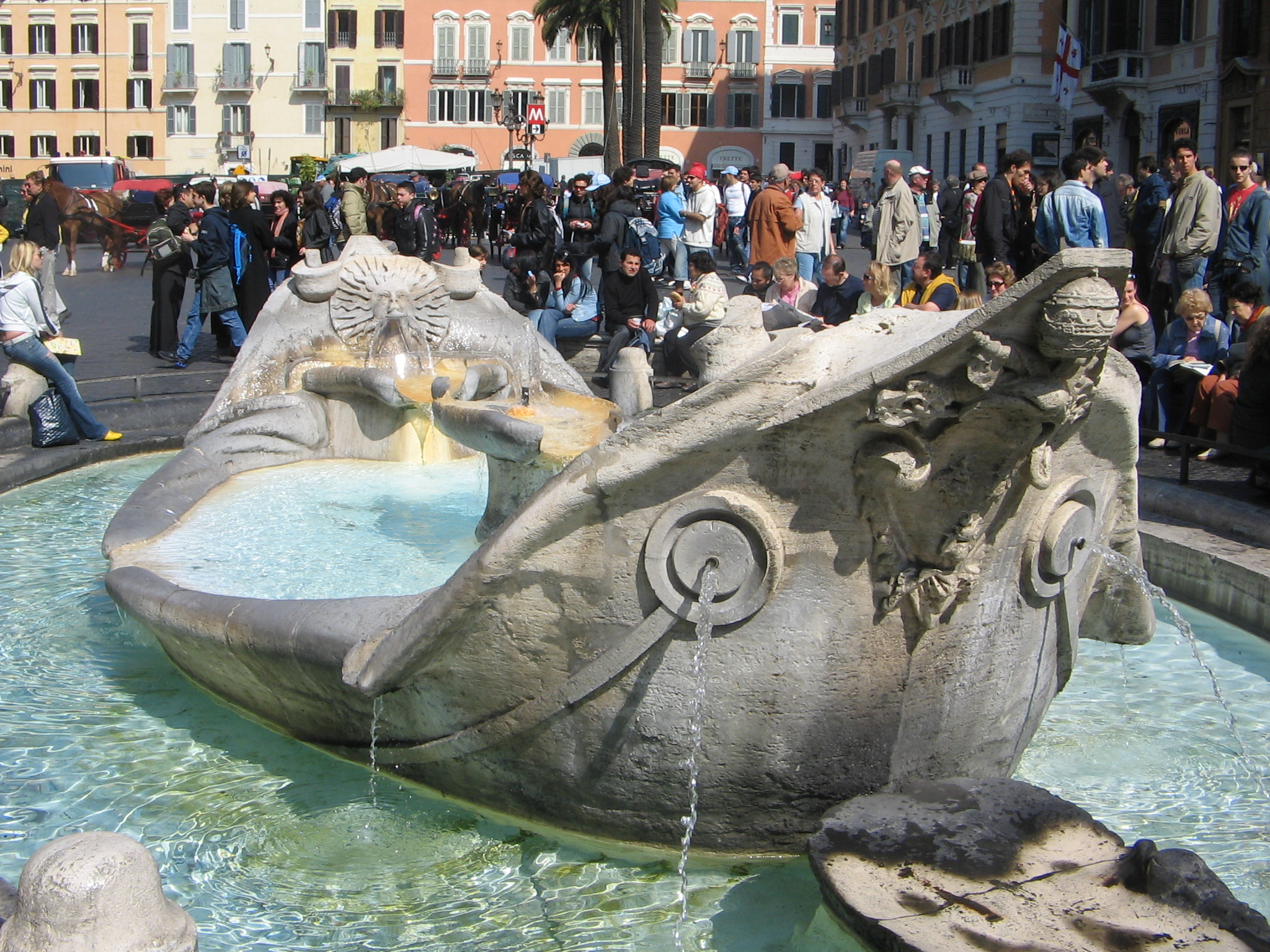
Fontana della Barcaccia, Rome

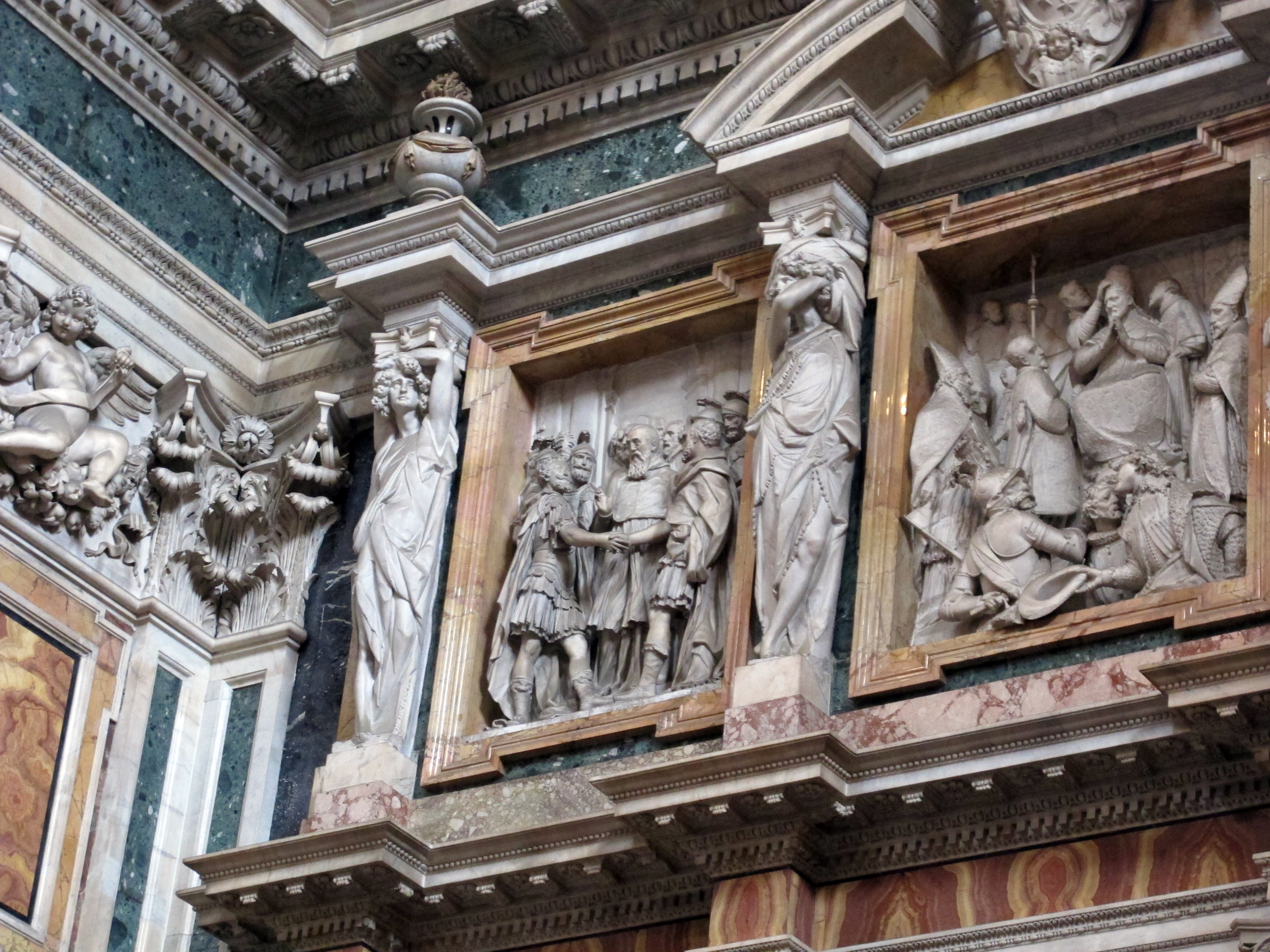
Basilica di Santa Maria Maggiore

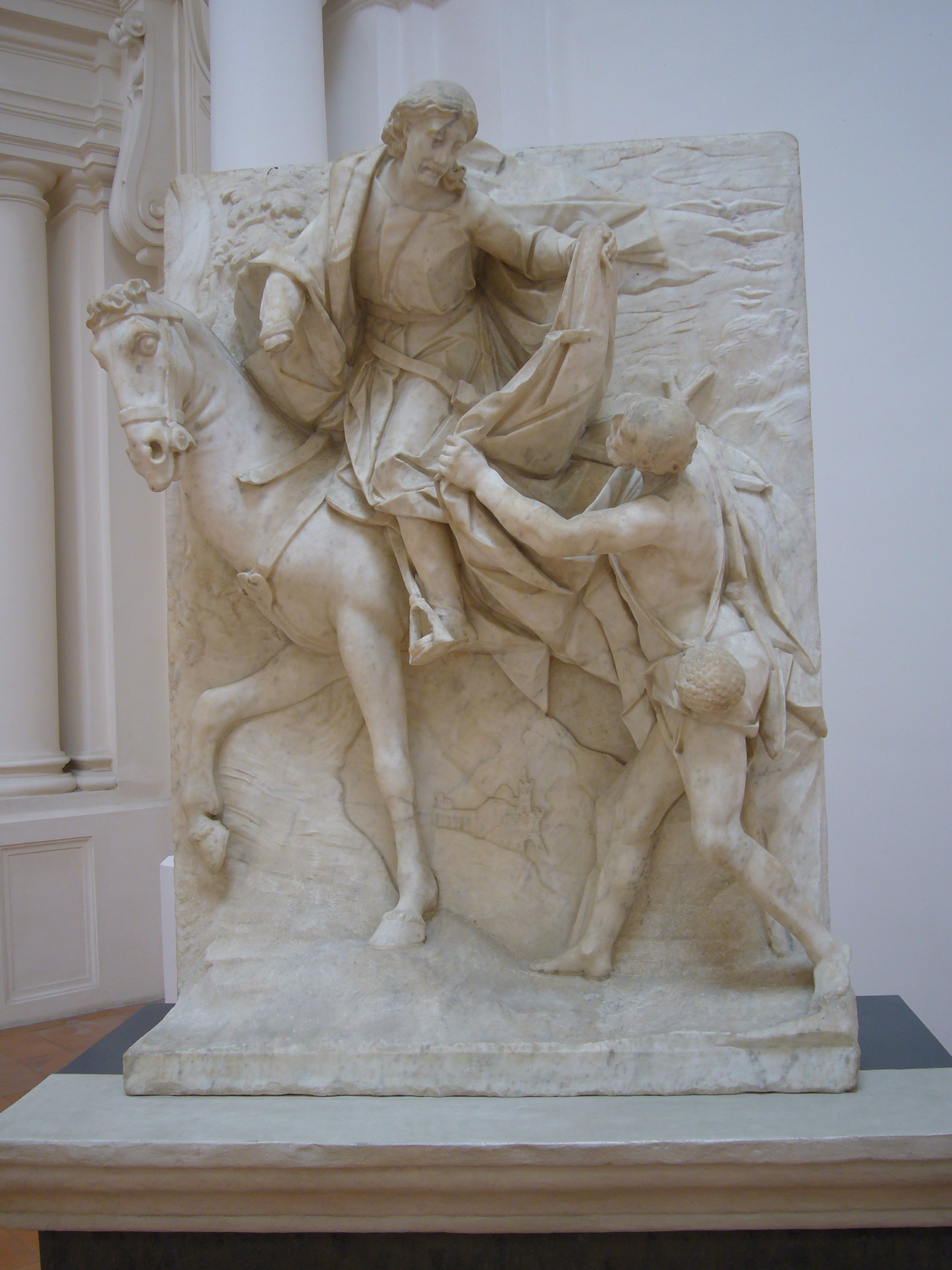
Saint Martin Dividing his Cloak, Certosa di San Martino, Naples

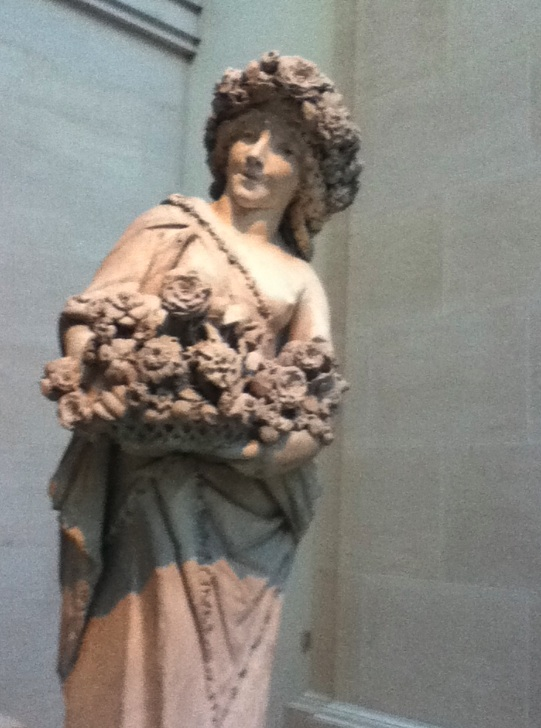
Flora by Pietro Bernini, 1616
