= Tomb of Countess Matilda of Tuscany =

Tomb by Gianlorenzo Bernini

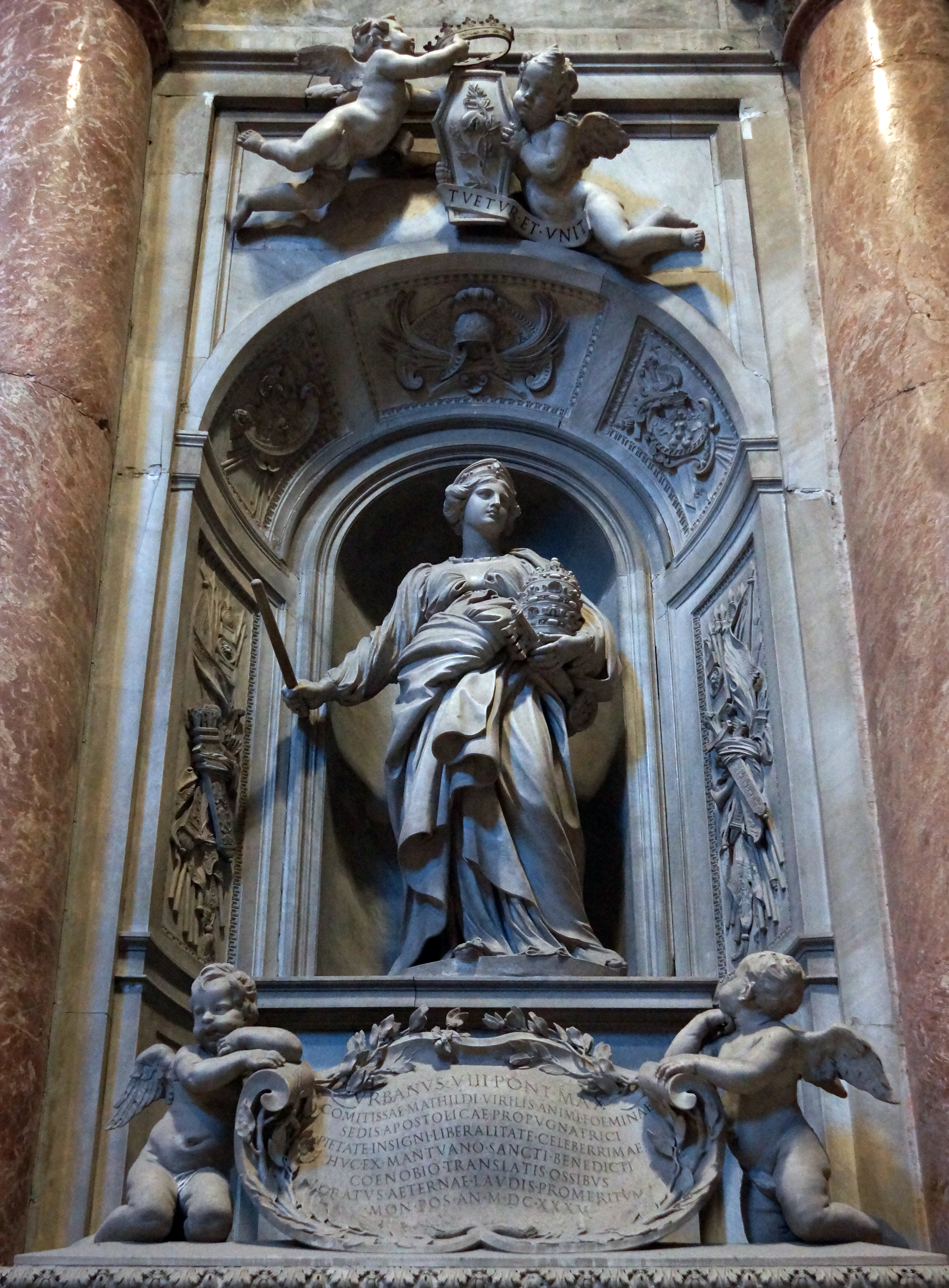
- Tomb of Countess Matilda of Tuscany in 2013
- Artist: Gian Lorenzo Bernini
- Year: 1633–1644
- Catalogue: 33
- Type: Sculpture
- Location: St. Peter's Basilica; Vatican City
- Preceded by: Two Busts of Cardinal Scipione Borghese
- Followed by: Pasce Oves Meas

The Tomb of Countess Matilda of Tuscany, also called the Monument to Matilda of Canossa, is a large sculptural memorial in St. Peter's Basilica designed by the Italian artist Gianlorenzo Bernini and executed by Bernini and various other sculptors. It commemorates the Italian noblewoman Matilda of Tuscany, who ruled over the March of Tuscany from 1055 to 1115.

== History ==
The sculpture was commissioned by Pope Urban VIII from Bernini in 1633 and was destined for St. Peter's, Rome, where it still sits now. The sculpture took a decade to create, with its final parts completed in 1644. The sculpture commemorates Matilda of Canossa (1046–1115) as a defender of the church throughout the eleventh and twelfth centuries against the forces of the Holy Roman Emperor. Matilda had been buried in the Abbey of San Benedetto di Polirone in Mantua in the twelfth century, but Pope Urban negotiated for her remains to be transported to Rome. It is speculated that this was to celebrate Pope Urban's roots in Tuscany as well as Matilda's support for the pope.

The full sculpture has a base of a sarcophagus carved with the Submission of the emperor Henry IV to Pope Gregory VII at Canossa Castle, supported by two cherubs, topped by a statue of Matilda holding the keys of St Peter and the papal crown in her left arm and a sword in her right hand. The historical event commemorated is known variously as the Road to Canossa, the Humiliation of Canossa (Italian: L'umiliazione di Canossa), or the Walk to Canossa (German: Gang nach Canossa/Kanossa). It was the journey taken by the Holy Roman Emperor Henry IV to Canossa Castle in 1077, and the ritual submission he was made to undertake there to Pope Gregory VII, seeking absolution and the revocation of his excommunication by the Pope. The castle was owned by Matilda of Tuscany, who was hosting Pope Gregory VII.

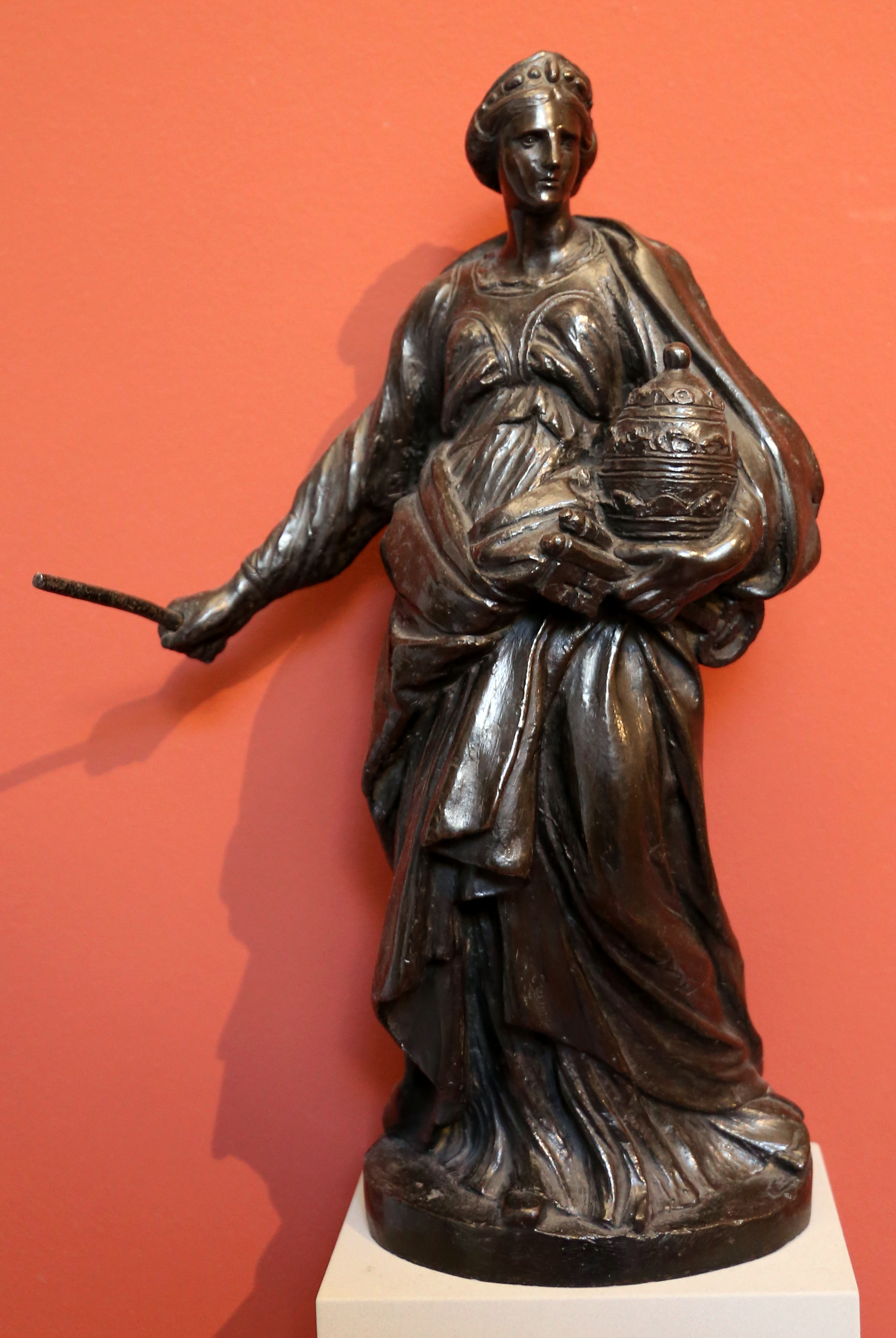
Gianlorenzo Bernini, Countess Matilda of Tuscany, from a model of c. 1633–37 in the Bode Museum in Berlin

Harvard Museums have a bronze statuette which was cast from Bernini's clay model for this sculpture. This statue is likely to have been intended as a model and possibly as a present for the pope as it is well finished. On the back of the statue are Bernini's tool marks which indicate that the design was always intended to be in a niche at Saint Peters. The Bode Museum in Berlin also holds a model (see image below).

== See also ==
- List of works by Gian Lorenzo Bernini
