= Boy with a Dragon =

Sculpture by Pietro Bernini and Gian Lorenzo Bernini

- Artist: Pietro Bernini/Gian Lorenzo Bernini
- Year: 1617
- Medium: White marble
- Subject: Hercules
- Location: Getty Museum, Los Angeles
- Owner: Getty Museum
- Accession: 1987

Boy with a Dragon is a c. 1617 white marble sculpture, now in the Getty Museum, which has owned it since 1987. It draws on the myth of the infant Hercules strangling serpents sent to kill him.

It was carved by Pietro Bernini and his son Gian Lorenzo Bernini for Maffeo Barberini (later Pope Urban VIII). In 1702 Urban's grand-nephew Carlo Barberini presented the work to Philip V of Spain on the latter's entry into Naples.
