= Pasce Oves Meas =

Relief designed by Gianlorenzo Bernini

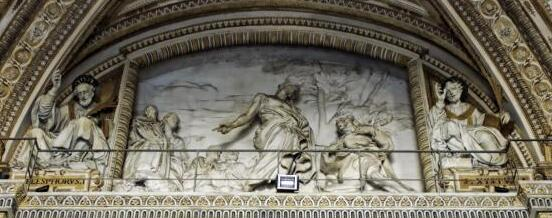
- Artist: Gian Lorenzo Bernini
- Year: 1633–1646
- Catalogue: 34
- Type: Sculpture
- Location: St. Peter's Basilica; Rome
- Preceded by: Tomb of Countess Matilda of Tuscany
- Followed by: Bust of Costanza Bonarelli

Pasce Oves Meas is a sculptural relief designed by the Italian artist Gianlorenzo Bernini and executed by members of his workshop, with some involvement of Bernini himself. The work was commissioned in 1633 but was not installed in its destination of St Peter's, Rome until 1646.

Pasce Oves Meas means 'Feed My Sheep' which was a command Jesus gave to St Peter to look after his 'flock' in various ways. The sculpture is located at the entrance to the Basilica.

Bernini was commissioned to design the piazza and fittings of the church as part of the rebuilding of St Peter's Basilica. St Peter's is an example of Italian High Renaissance architecture and Bernini a leading figure in Baroque sculpture.

== See also ==
- List of works by Gian Lorenzo Bernini
