= Triple Portrait of a Goldsmith =

Painting by Lorenzo Lotto

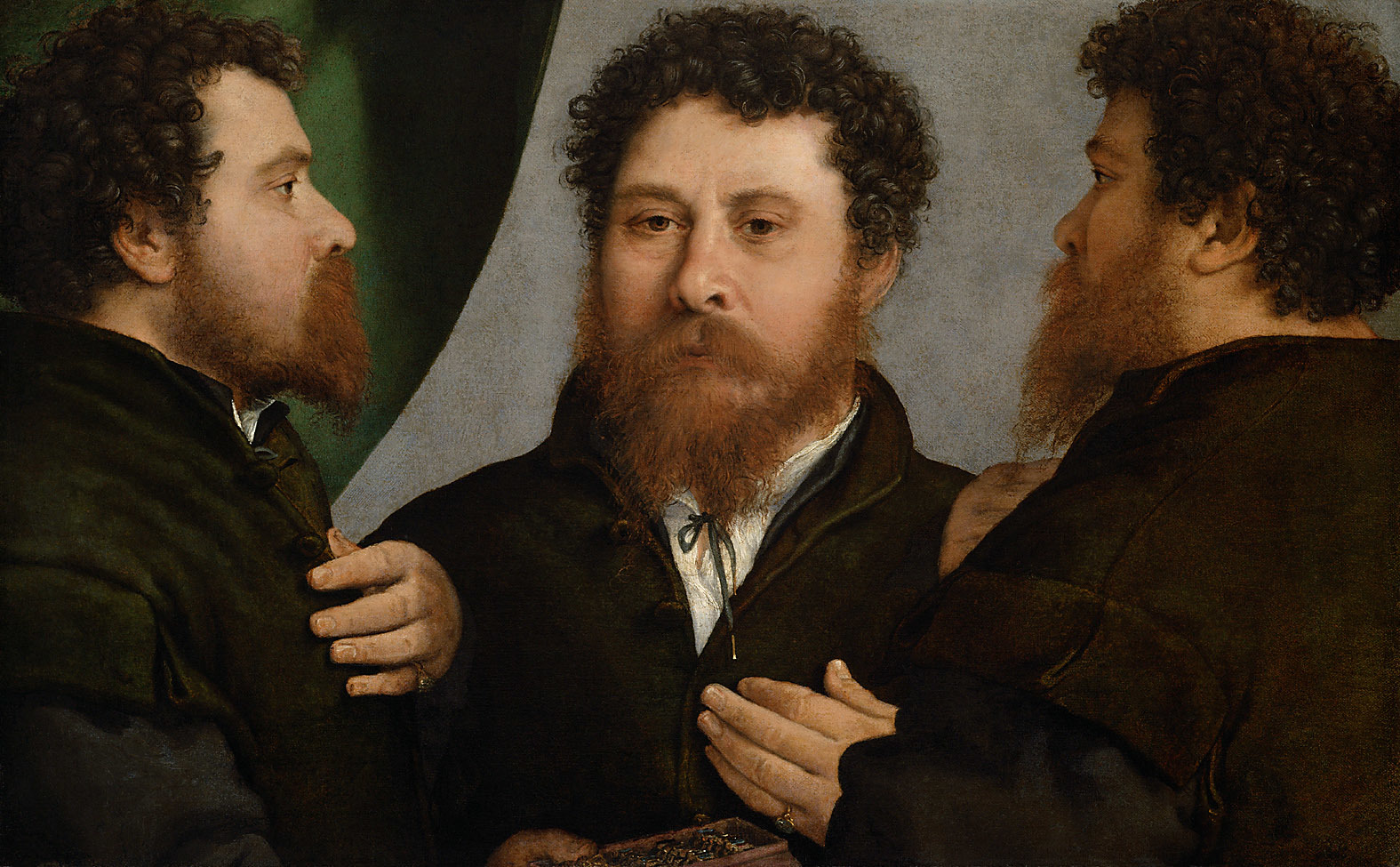
- Artist: Lorenzo Lotto
- Year: c. 1530
- Medium: oil on canvas
- Dimensions: 52.1 cm × 79.1 cm (20.5 in × 31.1 in)
- Location: Kunsthistorisches Museum, Vienna

The Triple Portrait of a Goldsmith or Portrait of a goldsmith from three angles is an oil-on-canvas painting by the Italian Renaissance artist Lorenzo Lotto, created c. 1530 and now held in the Kunsthistorisches Museum in Vienna. It was previously attributed to other artists such as Titian until it was identified with a painting of the same description described in various collection inventories as by the hand of Lotto. In 1627 it was in the collection of Vincenzo II Gonzaga, who sold it to Charles I of Great Britain, upon whose execution it was auctioned to Philip IV of Spain. It eventually entered the Habsburg collections in Austria via inheritance. Inventories show it has been in Vienna since at least 1733.

Influenced by existing medieval examples of triple portraits and by a lost triple portrait of Cesare Borgia by Leonardo da Vinci (and itself an influence on the 1635–36 Charles I in Three Positions by van Dyck), it shows the same man face on, in profile and from behind, all half-length. He is dressed in dark clothes, wears a ring on his left hand and in the front-on portrait holds a small object. That object was barely visible before restoration and had previously been interpreted as a 'lotto' or pack of cards, punning on the painter's surname. The painting was restored for a 1953 exhibition, demonstrating that the object was instead a ring-box, suggesting the subject was a goldsmith.

Further study has linked the subject with the goldsmith Bartolomeo Carpan, a friend of Lotto's and mentioned in the painter's Libro di spese diverse from 1538 onwards. No other documents support the theory, but if it is correct the "tre visi" or "three faces" of the portrait may be a pun on Carpan's hometown, Treviso.
