= Luigi Bernini =

Italian sculptor

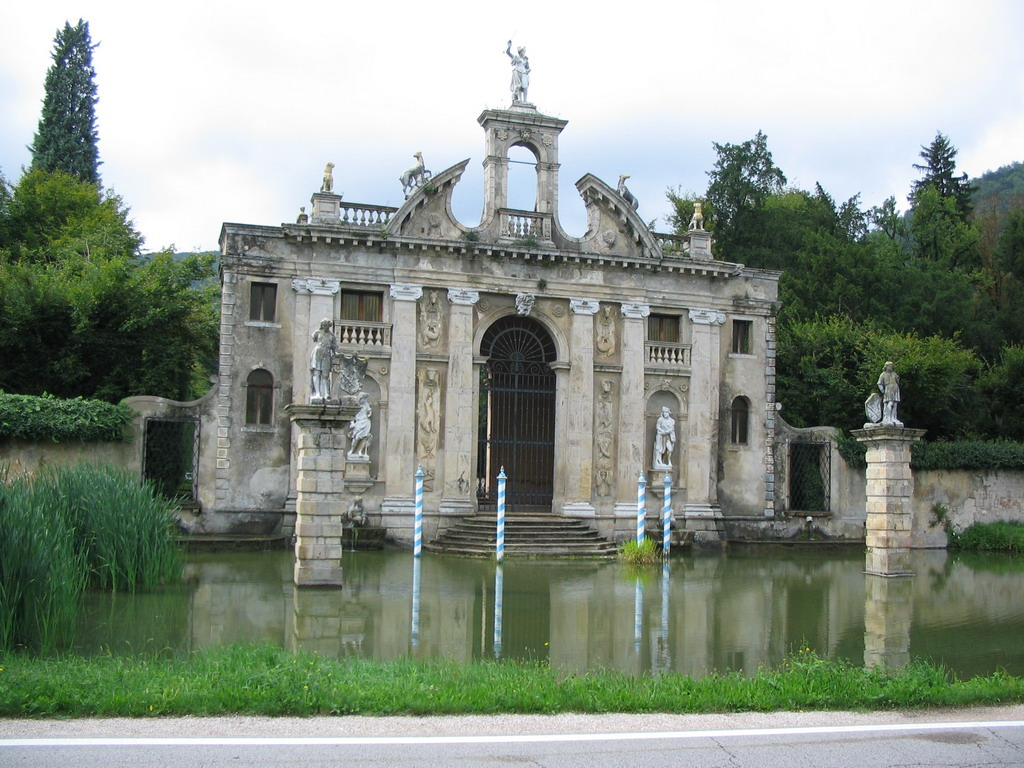
Entrance to Villa Barbarigo at Valsanzibio, designed by Bernini

Luigi Bernini (1612, Rome - 22 December 1681, Rome) was an Italian engineer, architect, and sculptor.

== Life ==
The son of Pietro Bernini and his wife Angelica Galante, he was born after the couple moved to Rome in 1605. He trained in his elder brother Gian Lorenzo's workshop and assisted him on several works such as the Baldacchino of St Peter's and the 1626 angel for the high altar in Sant'Agostino in Campo Marzio. Luigi had an affair with his brother Gian Lorenzo Bernini's mistress Costanza Piccolomini Bonarelli. In the summer of 1638 Gian Lorenzo found out about Costanza and his brother, and in a fit of mad fury, he chased Luigi through the streets of Rome, attacked Luigi with a crowbar, breaking two of his ribs, and then with a sword. Luigi saved himself in his flight by taking sanctuary in the basilica of Santa Maria Maggiore. Gian Lorenzo then sent a servant to slash Costanza's face with a razor, a traditional punishment for a woman who had offended a man's honour. Costanza was imprisoned for adultery and fornication in the monastery of Casa Pia, the servant was exiled, as was Luigi Bernini to protect him, and Gian Lorenzo Bernini was fined 3,000 scudi.

Luigi once again brought scandal to his family in 1670 by raping a young Bernini workshop assistant at the construction site of the 'Constantine' memorial in St. Peter's Basilica.

== Works ==
Bernini designed the 7-hectare gardens of Valsanzibio, where visitors to the garden arrived by gondola to a doorway of sculptures within sculptures within sculptures.
