= Macellum of Naples =

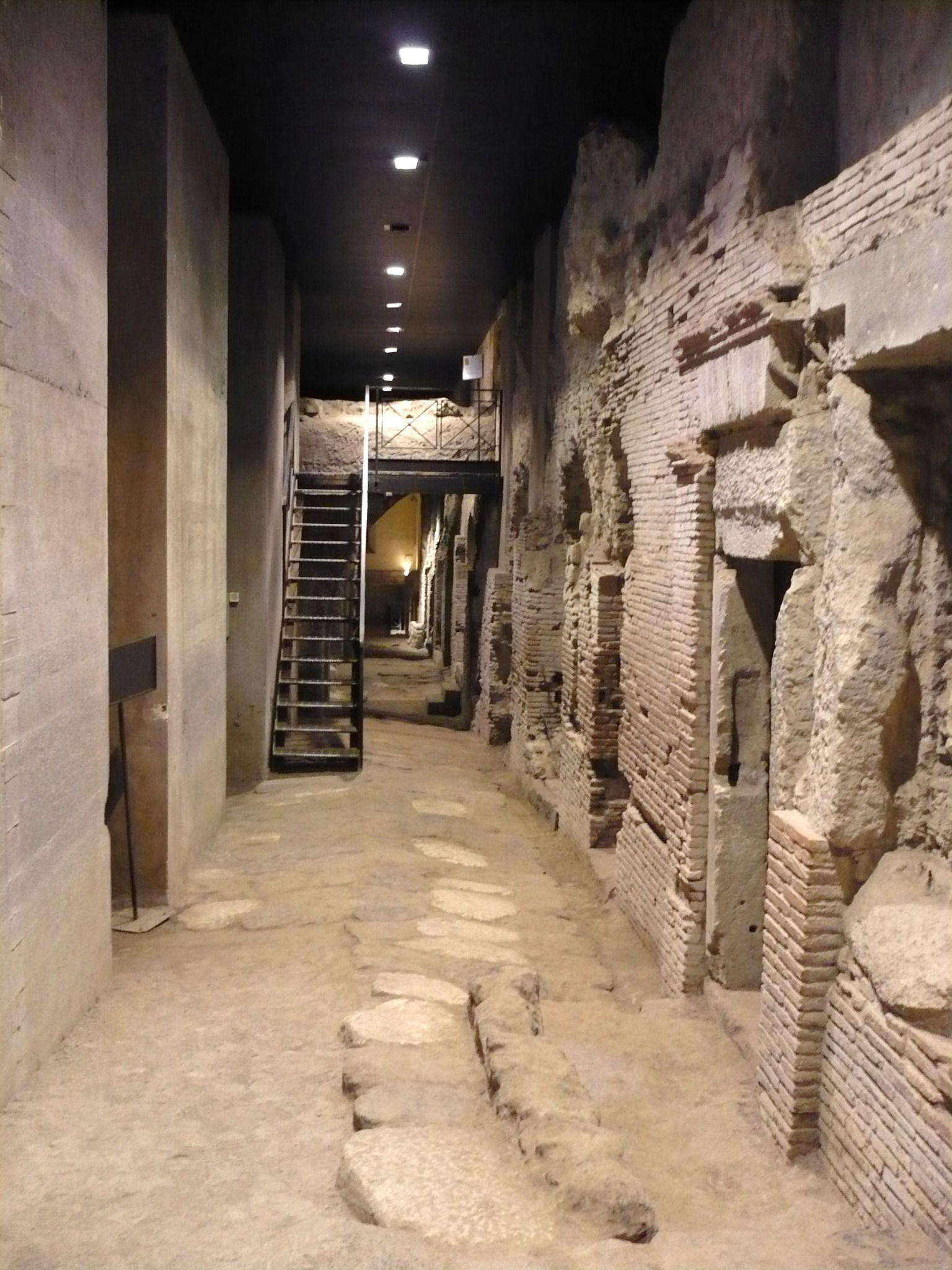
- Doorways towards the tabernae in the buried macellum beneath San Lorenzo Maggiore
- Interactive map of Macellum of Naples
- 40°51′3″N 14°15′30″E
- Type: Macellum
- Periods: Classical Greece to Roman Empire
- Location: Naples, Province of Naples, Campania, Italy

Site notes
- Website: Complesso Monumentale San Lorenzo Maggiore (in Italian)

The Macellum of Naples was the macellum or market building of the Roman city of Neapolis, now known as Naples. Due to the rise of the ground level the macellum is now located beneath the church of San Lorenzo Maggiore. The first construction dates to 5th or 4th century BC when the area was the location of the agora during the Greek period. When Neapolis became a Roman possession it was eventually transformed into a macellum. This structure was covered by a mudslide in the 5th century AD, probably as a result of flooding.

An early Christian basilica was constructed over the remains of the covered macellum. Consequently, this basilica was replaced by new construction over the centuries. As a result, the mud slide preserved the remains of the macellum.

The macellum had an entrance to the north, where the Via dei Tribunali runs now. The rectangular building consists of a porticoed area with workshops and an internal open courtyard with mosaic floors. In the middle of the courtyard was a tholos, a circular building used for food selling. Small tabernae, a laundry and the treasury can still be recognized.

Today the macellum can be visited as a part of the monumental complex of San Lorenzo Maggiore.
