= San Lorenzo Maggiore, Naples =

Church in Naples, Italy

Basilica of San Lorenzo Maggiore Basilica di San Lorenzo Maggiore (in Italian)
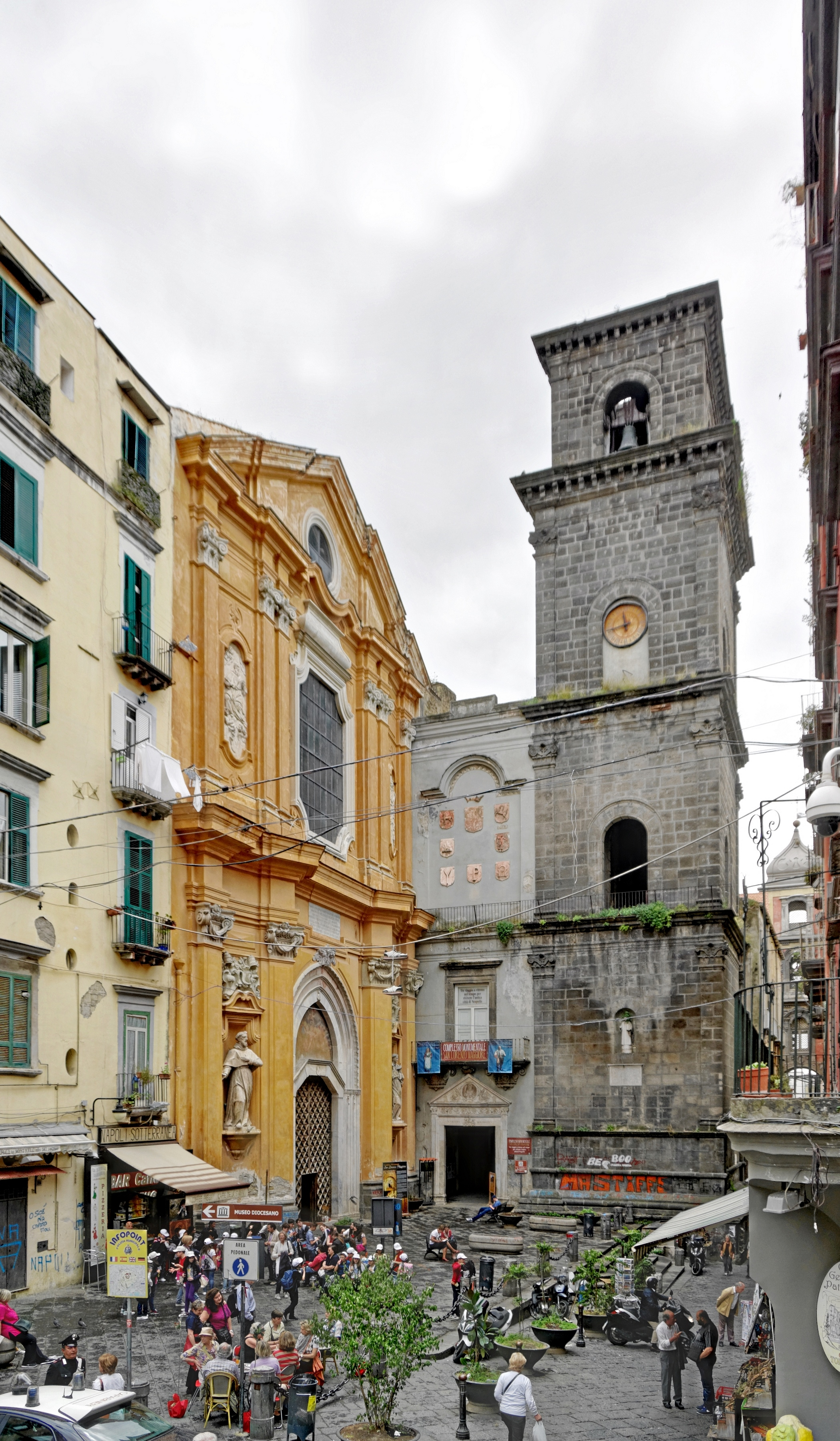
- Façade of San Lorenzo Maggiore.

Religion
- Affiliation: Roman Catholic
- Diocese: Archdiocese of Naples
- Ecclesiastical or organizational status: Minor basilica

Location
- Location: Naples, Campania, Italy
- Interactive map of Basilica of San Lorenzo Maggiore; Basilica di San Lorenzo Maggiore (in Italian)
- Coordinates: 40.85093°N 14.25812°E

Architecture
- Type: Church

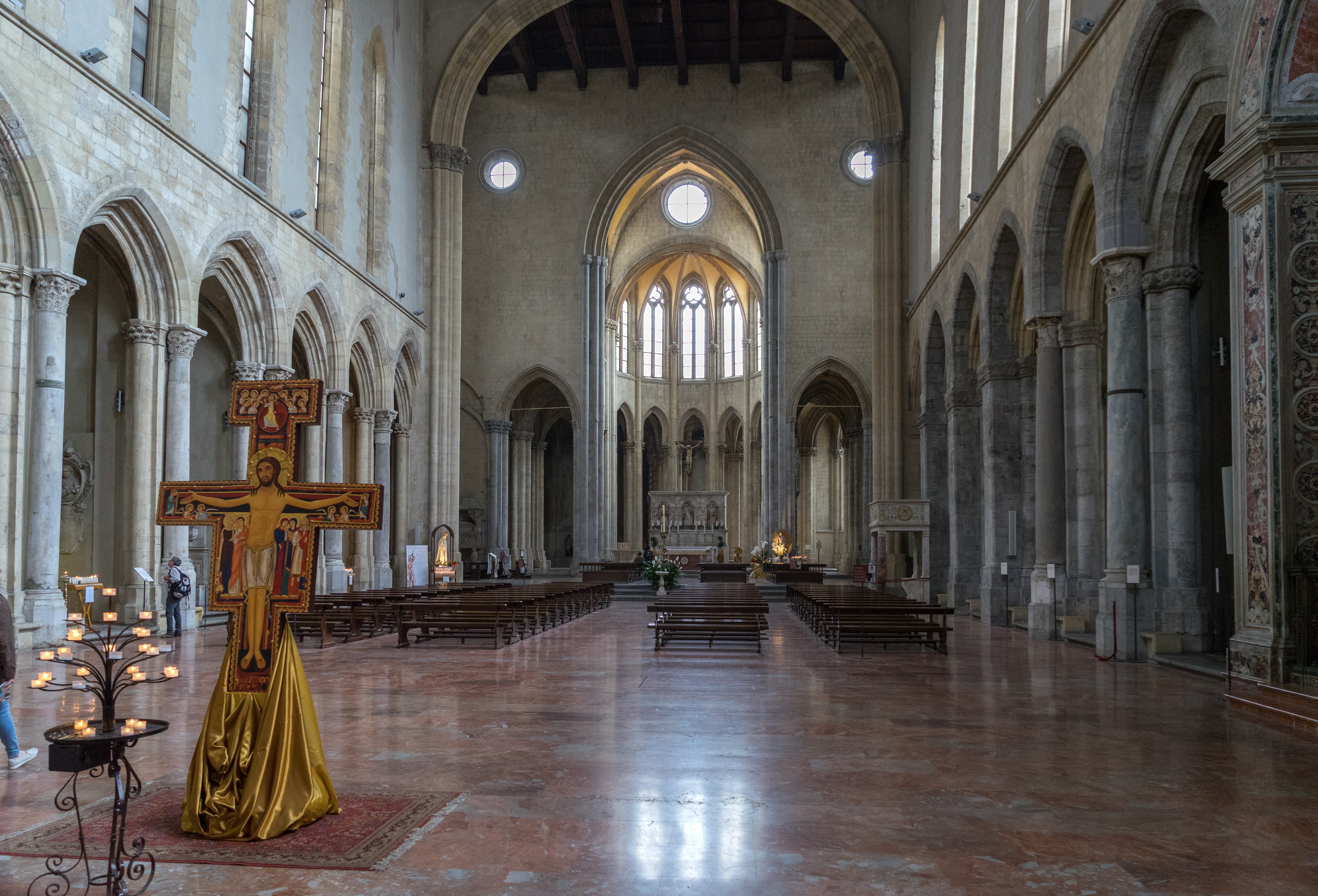
interior of San Lorenzo

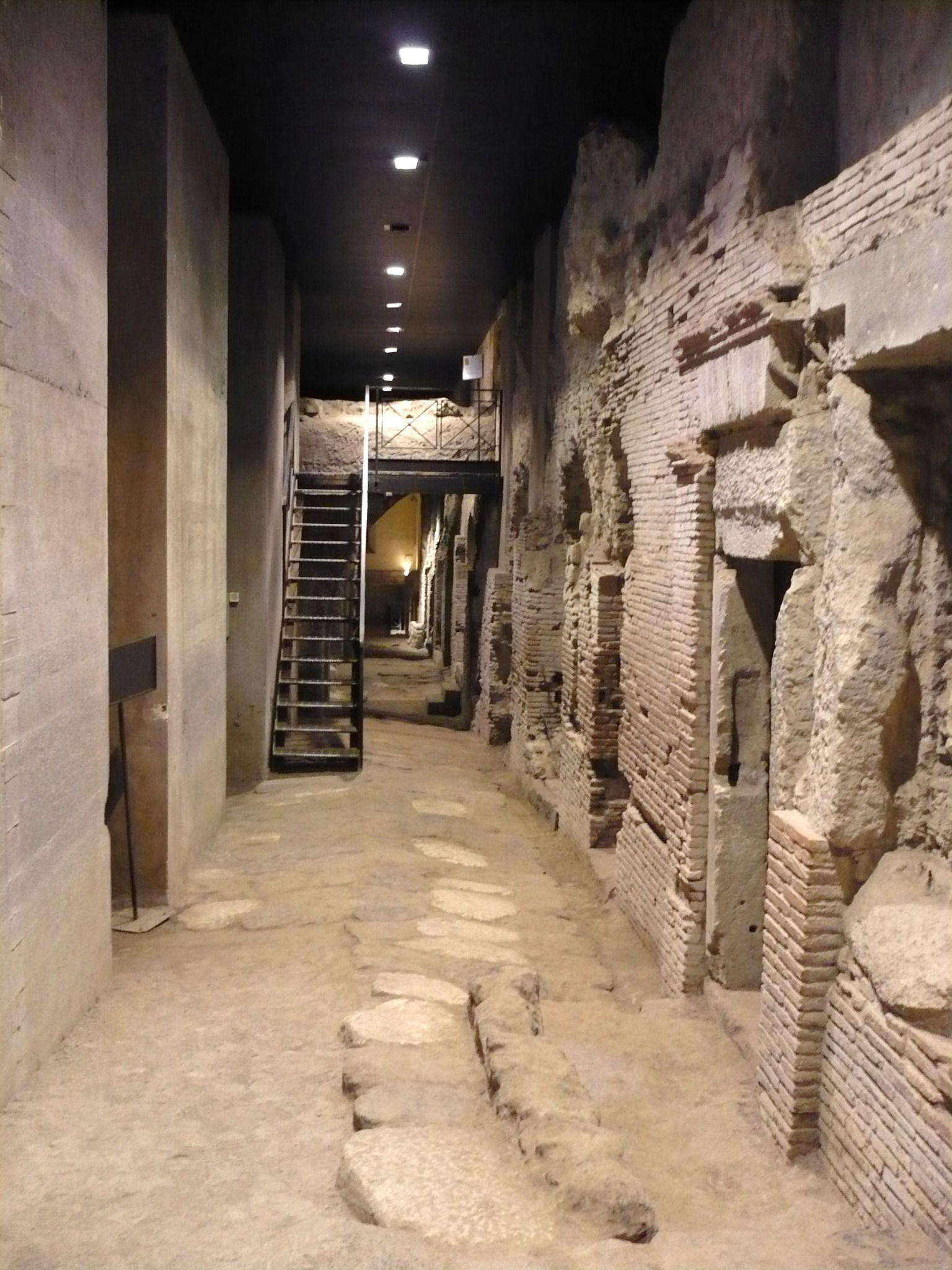
The Macellum of Naples, an ancient Roman market beneath the church.

San Lorenzo Maggiore is a church in Naples, Italy. It is located at the precise geographic center of the historic center of the ancient Greek-Roman city, at the intersection of via San Gregorio Armeno and via dei Tribunali. The name "San Lorenzo" may also refer to the new museum now opened on the premises, as well as to the ancient Roman market beneath the church itself, the Macellum of Naples.

The church's origins derive from the presence of the Franciscan order in Naples during the lifetime of St Francis of Assisi, himself. The site of the present church was to compensate the order for the loss of their earlier church on the grounds where Charles I of Anjou decided to build his new fortress, the Maschio Angioino in the late 13th century.

San Lorenzo is both a church and monastery and the new museum takes up the three floors above the courtyard and is given over to the entire history of the area that centers on San Lorenzo, beginning with classical archaeology and progressing to a chart display of historical shipping routes from Naples throughout Magna Grecia and the Roman Empire. The museum provides a detailed account of the local "city hall" that was demolished in order to put up the church in the 13th century and continues up past the Angevin period and into more recent history.

Beneath San Lorenzo, about half of an original Roman market has been excavated. The site has been open since 1992, the result of 25 years of painstaking excavation. The market place is the only large-scale Greek-Roman site excavated in the downtown area.

In this church Boccaccio met his beloved Fiammetta (1338).

The church and monastery now belong to the Conventual branch of the Franciscans.

== Chapels ==
Two of the chapels in this Gothic church are designed in baroque manner. These are the Cacace Chapel and the Chapel of Sant'Antonio. Both are designed by Cosimo Fanzago. The first of these chapels was commissioned by Giovan Camillo Cacace, lawyer and member of the Accademia degli Oziosi; while the latter chapel was made for the Carthusian Order. His use of richly colored inlaid marble contrasts with the more sober Gothic interior of the church.

=== Cacace Chapel ===
The Cacace Chapel is dedicated to Mary of the Rosary when it was acquired by the De Caro family in 1571. Giovan Camillo Cacace, nephew of Francesco and Giuseppe De Caro, decided to renovate the chapel in the 1640s. He commissioned Fanzago for the realization, but other artists were invited as well. Four of the sculptures in this chapel were executed by Andrea di Bolgi, a sculptor from the Bernini studio in Rome. The sculptures include: to the left the whole figure of Giuseppe De Caro, kneeling, with below the bust of his brother, Francesco De Caro. To the right is the praying and kneeling figure of Vittoria De Caro, sister of Giuseppe and Francesco, and mother of the commissioner, Giovan Camillo. His bust is shown below Vittoria.

The cupola of the chapel is frescoed by Niccolò De Simone, who substituted the prior artist, Massimo Stanzione. It depicts the Trinity and Glory of the Virgin, though the fresco is severely damaged and hardly visible nowadays. At the sides are the Friendship between Saints Francis and Dominic and the Sleep of Innocent XIII Who Sees Saints Francis and Dominic rule over the ruined Lateran. The four pendants the painter depicted Saints John the Baptist, Joseph, Anne and Joachim.

The altarpiece is painted by Massimo Stanzione and depicts the Our Lady of the Rosary, a subject that became popular after the Council of Trent of 1563. His style annamolla of Caravaggio, though with brighter use of color and more attention to physiology.

== See also ==
- Delivery of the Franciscan Rule
- Gotico Angioino
