= Busts of Paolo Giordano and Isabella Orsini =

Sculptures by Gianlorenzo Bernini

- Artist: Gian Lorenzo Bernini
- Year: 1635
- Catalogue: 36
- Type: Sculpture
- Medium: Marble
- Location: Castello Orsini-Odescalchi; Bracciano
- Preceded by: Bust of Costanza Bonarelli
- Followed by: Statue of Pope Urban VIII

The busts of Paolo Giordano and Isabella Orsini are two sculptural portraits of the Duke of Bracciano (Paolo Giordano) and his wife Isabella Orsini. They were carried out by the Italian artist Gianlorenzo Bernini and members of his studio. Executed around 1635, the two sculptures remain in the Castello Orsini-Odescalchi in Bracciano, Italy.

== See also ==
- List of works by Gian Lorenzo Bernini
