= Charles I in Three Positions =

Painting by Anthony van Dyck

- Triple Portrait of Charles I
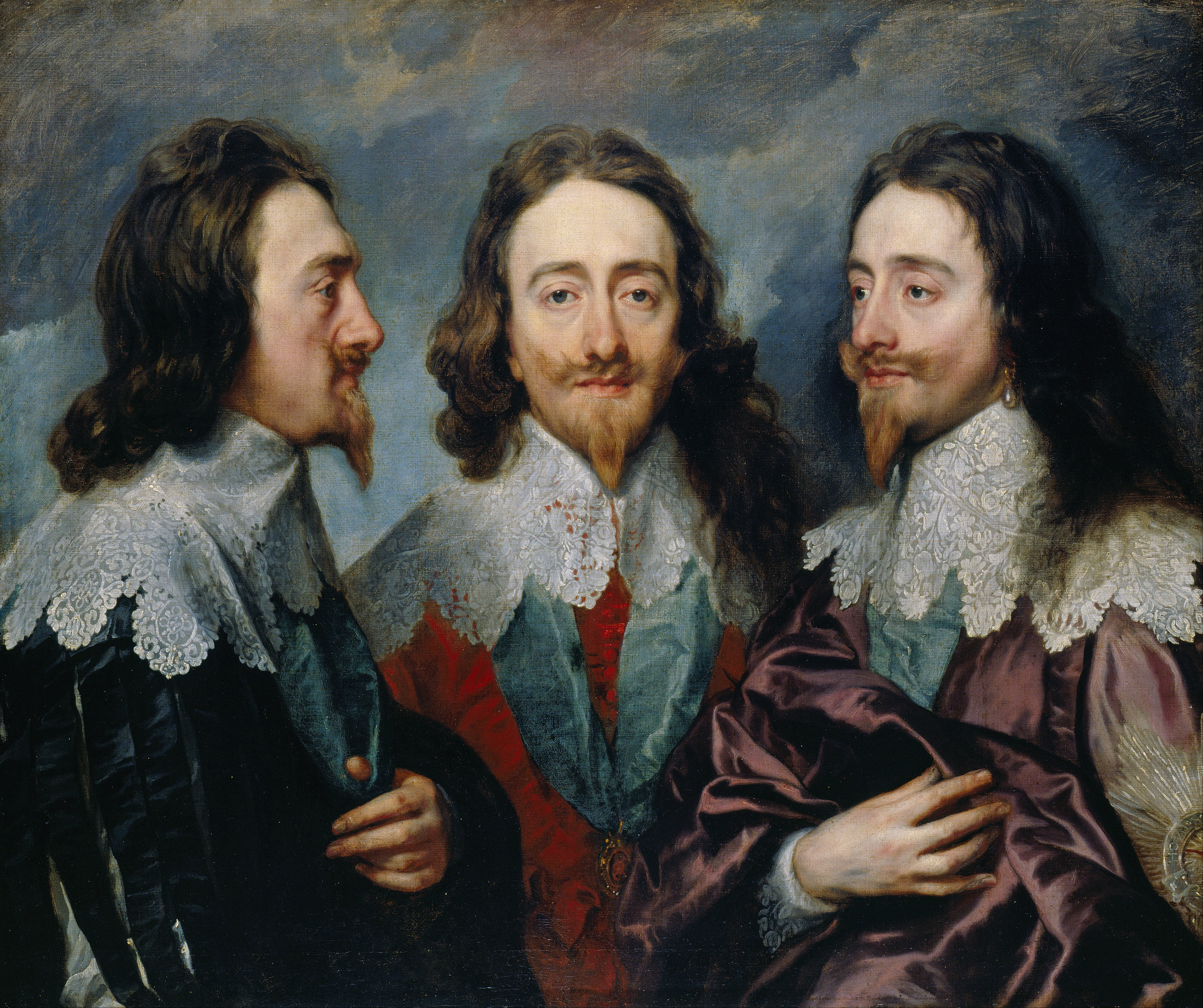
- Artist: Anthony van Dyck
- Year: 1635–1636
- Medium: Oil on canvas
- Subject: Charles I of England
- Dimensions: 99.4 cm × 84.4 cm (39.1 in × 33.2 in)
- Location: The King's Gallery, Palace of Holyroodhouse (as of 2025)
- 51°29′00″N 0°36′15″W
- Owner: Royal Collection
- Accession: RCIN 404420

Charles I in Three Positions, also known as the Triple Portrait of Charles I, is an oil painting of King Charles I of England painted in 1635–1636 by the Flemish artist Sir Anthony van Dyck, showing the King from three viewpoints: left full profile, face on, and right three-quarter profile. It is currently part of the Royal Collection.

The colours of the costumes and pattern of the lace collars are different in each portrait, though the blue riband of the Order of the Garter is present in all three. The painting was probably begun in the latter part of 1635 and was sent to Rome in 1636 to be used as a reference work for the Italian sculptor Gian Lorenzo Bernini to create a marble bust of Charles I. Pope Urban VIII sent the bust to Charles's queen Henrietta Maria in 1638 in the hope of encouraging a reconciliation of the Roman Catholic Church with the Church of England.

The bust was presented in 1637 and admired for its workmanship and likeness to the King. Charles rewarded Bernini with a valuable diamond ring. Queen Henrietta Maria commissioned Bernini to make a companion bust of her, but the English Civil War intervened and it was never made. The bust of Charles was sold at the end of the Civil War but was recovered for the Royal Collection on the Restoration, only to be destroyed by a fire in Whitehall Palace in January 1698.

The painting remained in the possession of Bernini and his heirs in the Palazzo Bernini on the Via del Corso until c. 1802, when it was sold to the British art dealer William Buchanan and returned to England. It was exhibited at the British Gallery on Pall Mall in 1821. It was acquired for the Royal Collection in 1822.

It is thought that the painting was influenced by Lorenzo Lotto's Triple Portrait of a Goldsmith, c. 1530, then in the Royal Collection. In its turn, van Dyck's portrait of Charles I may have influenced Philippe de Champaigne's triple portrait of Cardinal de Richelieu, c. 1642.

Many copies of the work were made, possibly by supporters of the House of Stuart, including one created around 1750 and now in the collection of the Victoria and Albert Museum in London.

The British Museum has an engraving which was believed to depict the bust before it was destroyed, with Baroque locks of flowing hair, fine lace collar, garter sash, possibly by Robert van Voerst, but this is now believed to show a bust by François Dieussart.

Other triple portraits

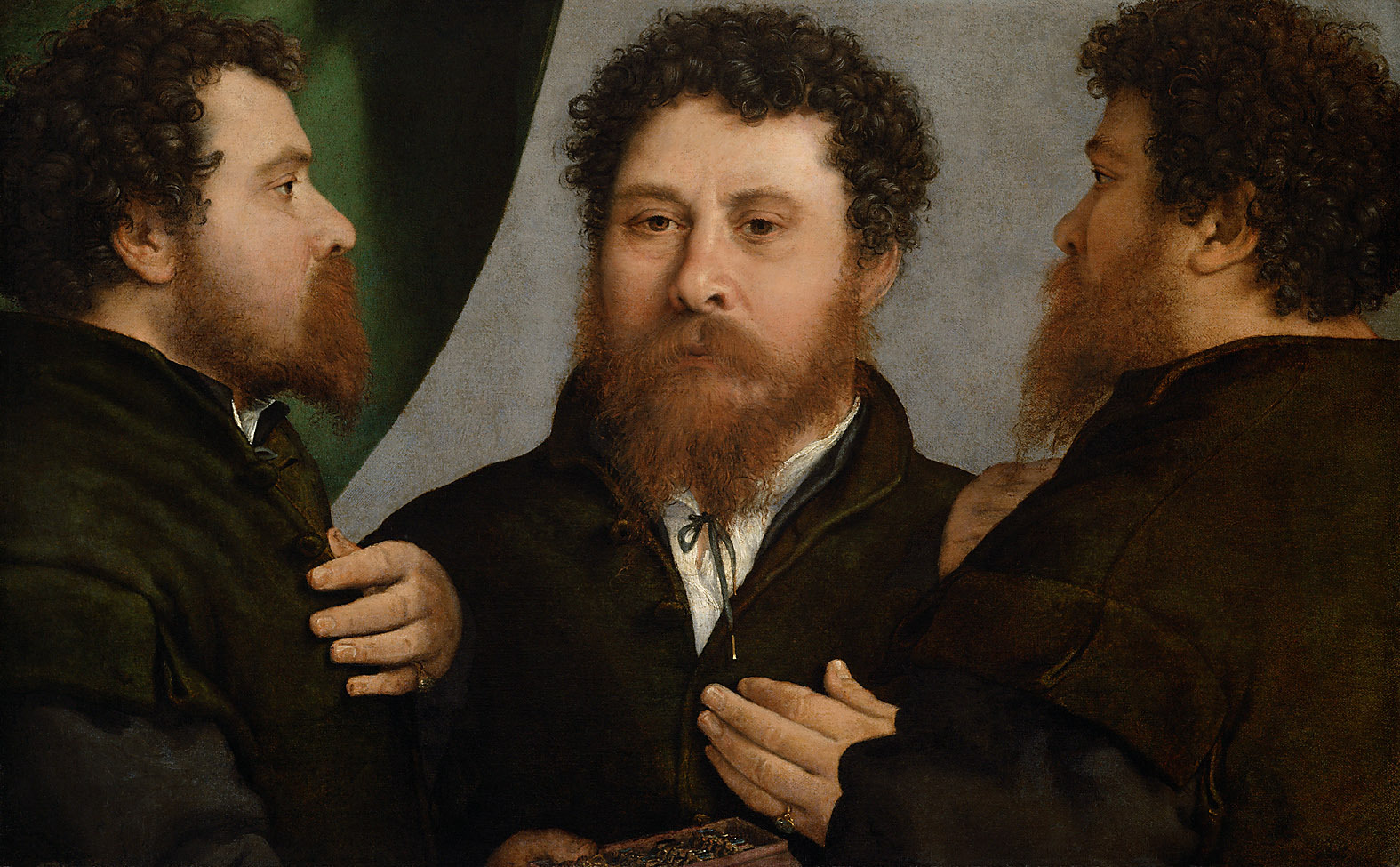
Triple Portrait of a Goldsmith, Lorenzo Lotto, c. 1530, Kunsthistorisches Museum, Vienna

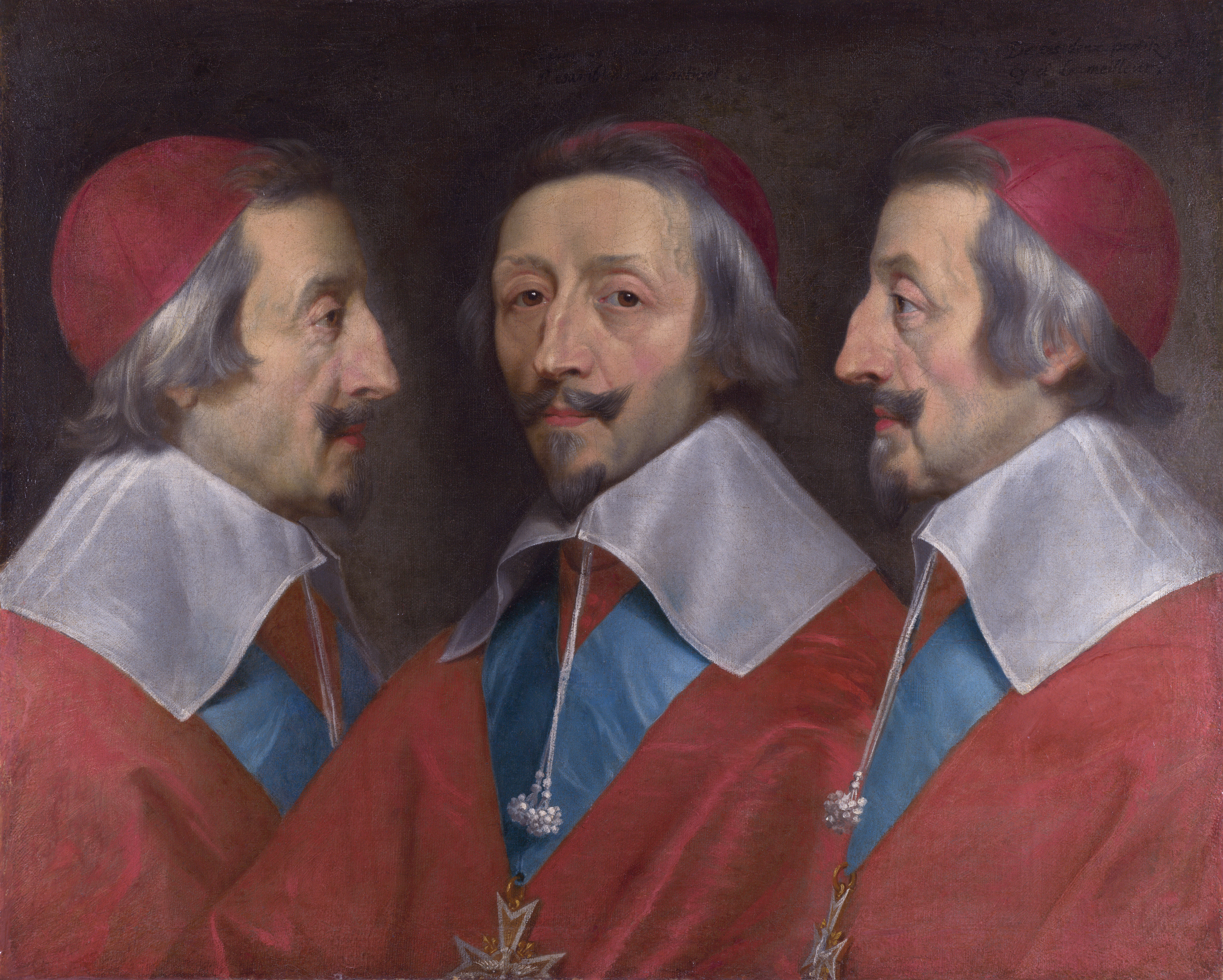
Triple Portrait of Cardinal de Richelieu, Philippe de Champaigne, c. 1642, National Gallery, London

== See also ==
- List of paintings by Anthony van Dyck
- Triple Portrait of Henrietta Maria
- Triple Portrait of Charles, Prince of Wales
- Triple Portrait of Diana, Princess of Wales
