= Bust of King Charles I (Bernini) =

Lost sculpture by Gian Lorenzo Bernini

Bust of Charles I
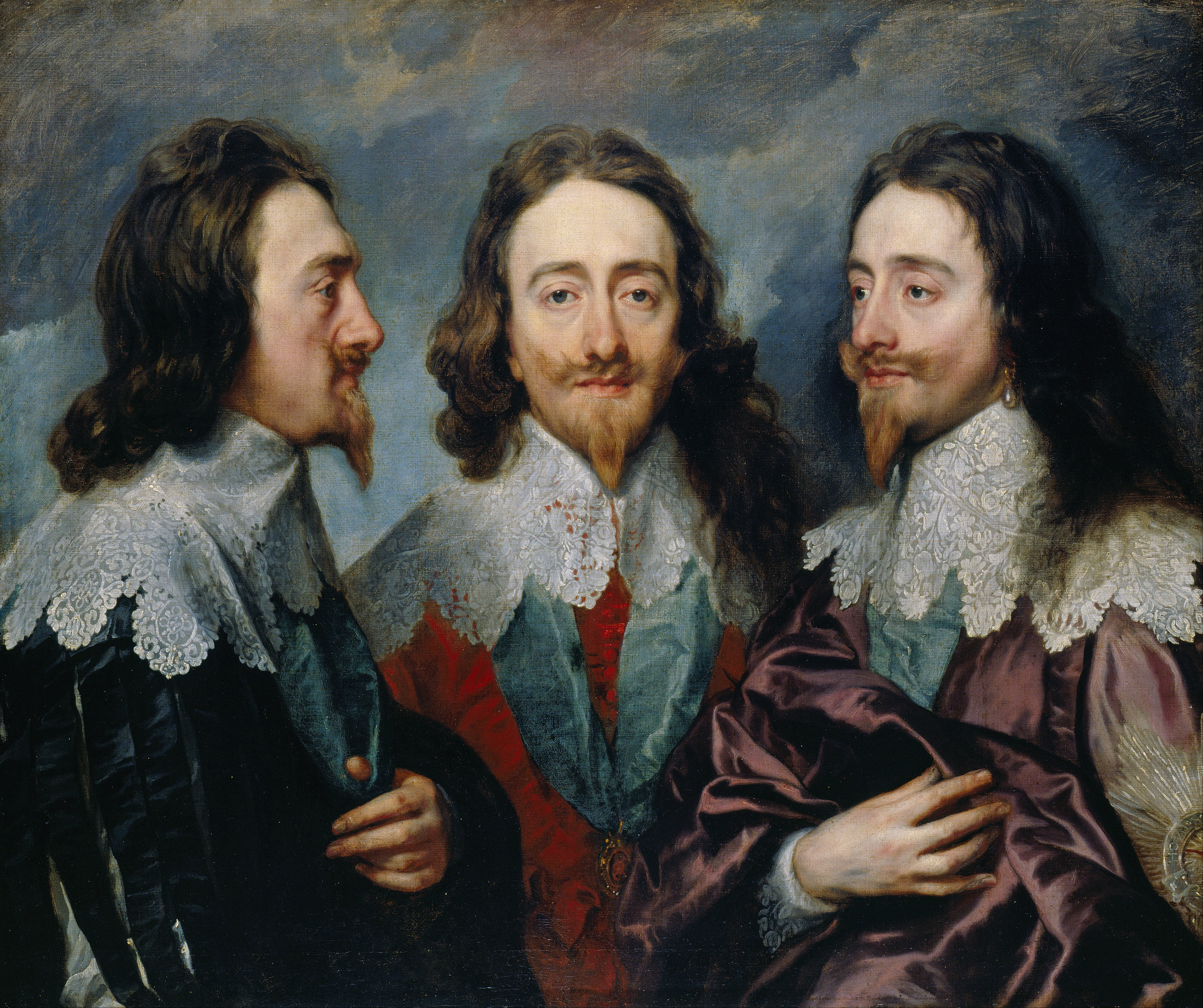
- Van Dyck triple portrait of Charles I used for the sculpture
- Artist: Gian Lorenzo Bernini
- Year: 1635-40
- Catalogue: 39
- Type: Sculpture
- Medium: Marble
- Subject: Charles I of England
- Dimensions: Over life-size
- Condition: destroyed
- Location: Whitehall Palace, London
- Preceded by: Statue of Pope Urban VIII
- Followed by: Bust of Thomas Baker

The Bust of Charles I was a sculptural bust, now destroyed, made by the Italian artist Gianlorenzo Bernini which according to one historian, "set the visual conventions for centuries ... [establishing itself as] the official portrait of secular absolutism.". The sculpture was of the then king Charles I of England, who wrote to Bernini that the artist's name was "exalted above those of all men of talent who have exercised your profession."

Pope Urban VIII commissioned the bust as a diplomatic gift to Charles's Catholic queen Henrietta Maria in 1637 in the hope of encouraging a reconciliation of the Roman Catholic Church with the Church of England.

Along with most of the Royal Collection, the bust was sold at the end of the English Civil War by the English Commonwealth government, but recovered for the crown after the Restoration of 1660, only to be destroyed by a fire in Whitehall Palace in January 1698.

Numerous copies of the image exist in other forms (e.g. engravings, bronze sculptures).

== Creation ==
Bernini did not travel to London to undertake the work; rather he made use of a painted triple portrait of Charles I (i.e. a view of Charles from three points) created especially by the Flemish artist Anthony van Dyck for Bernini. Despite Bernini's never meeting Charles I face-to-face, the bust was considered a success at the time, and the English king rewarded Bernini with jewellery worth over 4,000 Roman scudi (a figure over 60 times the average yearly salary of a worker in Rome).

The bust was presented in 1637 and admired for its workmanship and likeness to the king. Charles rewarded Bernini with a valuable diamond ring. Queen Henrietta Maria commissioned Bernini to make a companion bust of her, but the English Civil War intervened and it was never made.

For a time in the 19th and early 20th centuries, there was a belief in England and elsewhere that Bernini had also created a bust of Oliver Cromwell, the victor over Charles I in the English Civil War. However, the attribution was refuted in 1922.

== See also ==
- List of works by Gian Lorenzo Bernini
