= Santa Maria del Popolo =

Basilica of Santa Maria del Popolo
- Parish Basilica of Santa Maria del Popolo
- Latin: Basilica Sancta Mariæ de Populo; Italian: Basilica Parrocchiale Santa Maria del Popolo
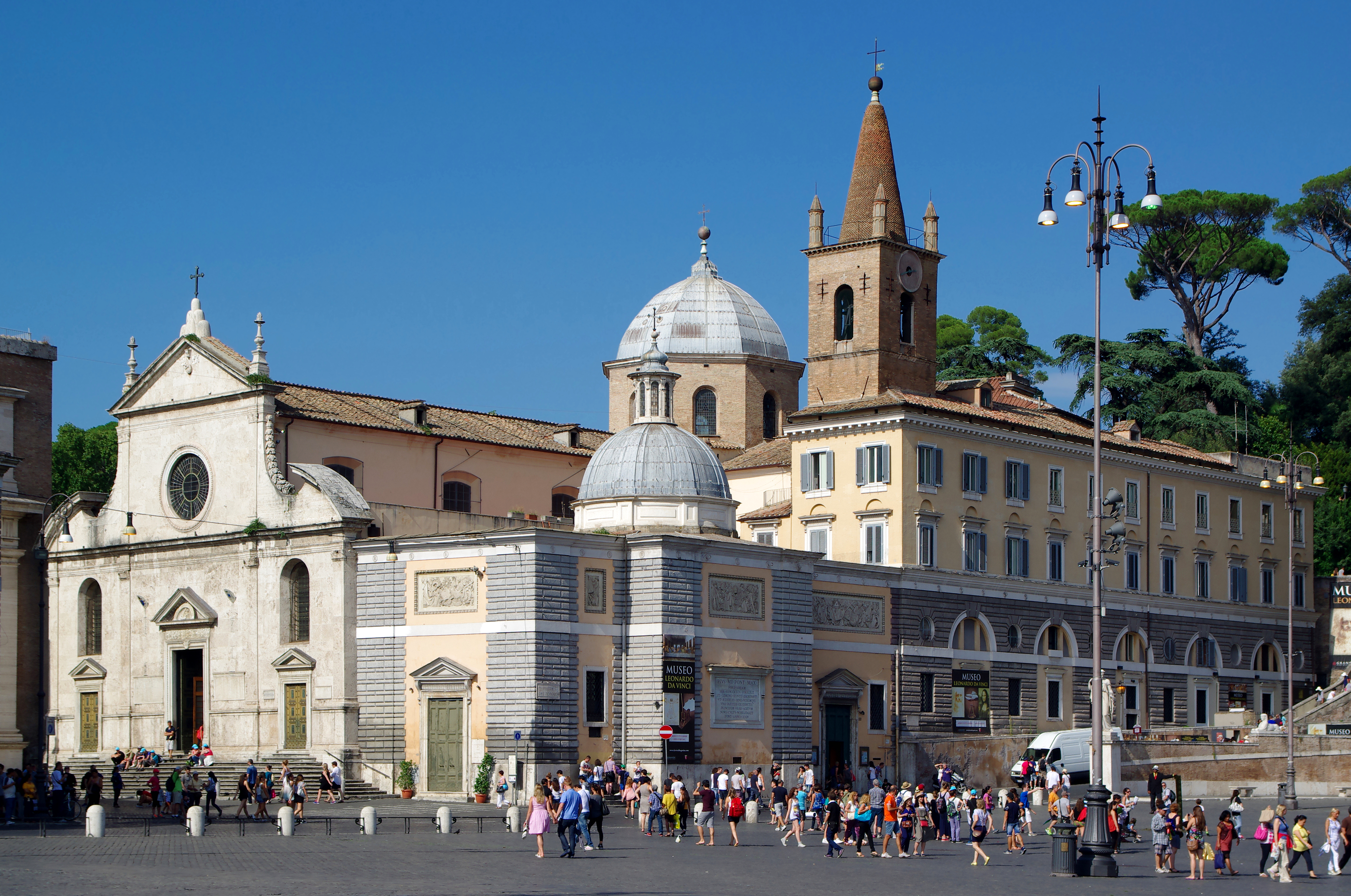
- The church from Piazza del Popolo
- Click on the map for a fullscreen view
- 41°54′41″N 12°28′35″E
- Location: Rome
- Country: Italy
- Denomination: Catholic
- Tradition: Latin Church
- Religious order: Order of Saint Augustine
- Website: www.agostiniani.it/comunita-agostiniane-provincia/parrocchia-santa-maria-popolo/

History
- Status: Basilica minor, parish church (1561), titular church (1587)
- Founded: 1099
- Founder: Pope Paschal II
- Dedication: Blessed Virgin Mary
- Consecrated: 1477

Architecture
- Functional status: Active
- Architect(s): Andrea Bregno, Donato Bramante, Gian Lorenzo Bernini
- Architectural type: Basilica
- Style: Renaissance and baroque
- Groundbreaking: 1472
- Completed: 1477

Administration
- Diocese: Diocese of Rome

Clergy
- Priest: Ivan Caputo

The Parish Basilica of Santa Maria del Popolo (Italian: Basilica Parrocchiale Santa Maria del Popolo) is a titular church and a minor basilica in Rome run by the Augustinian order. It stands on the north side of Piazza del Popolo, one of the most famous squares in the city. The church is hemmed in between the Pincian Hill and Porta del Popolo, one of the gates in the Aurelian Wall as well as the starting point of Via Flaminia, the most important route from the north. Its location made the basilica the first church for the majority of travellers entering the city. The church contains works by several famous artists, such as Raphael, Gian Lorenzo Bernini, Caravaggio, Alessandro Algardi, Pinturicchio, Andrea Bregno, Guillaume de Marcillat and Donato Bramante.

== History ==
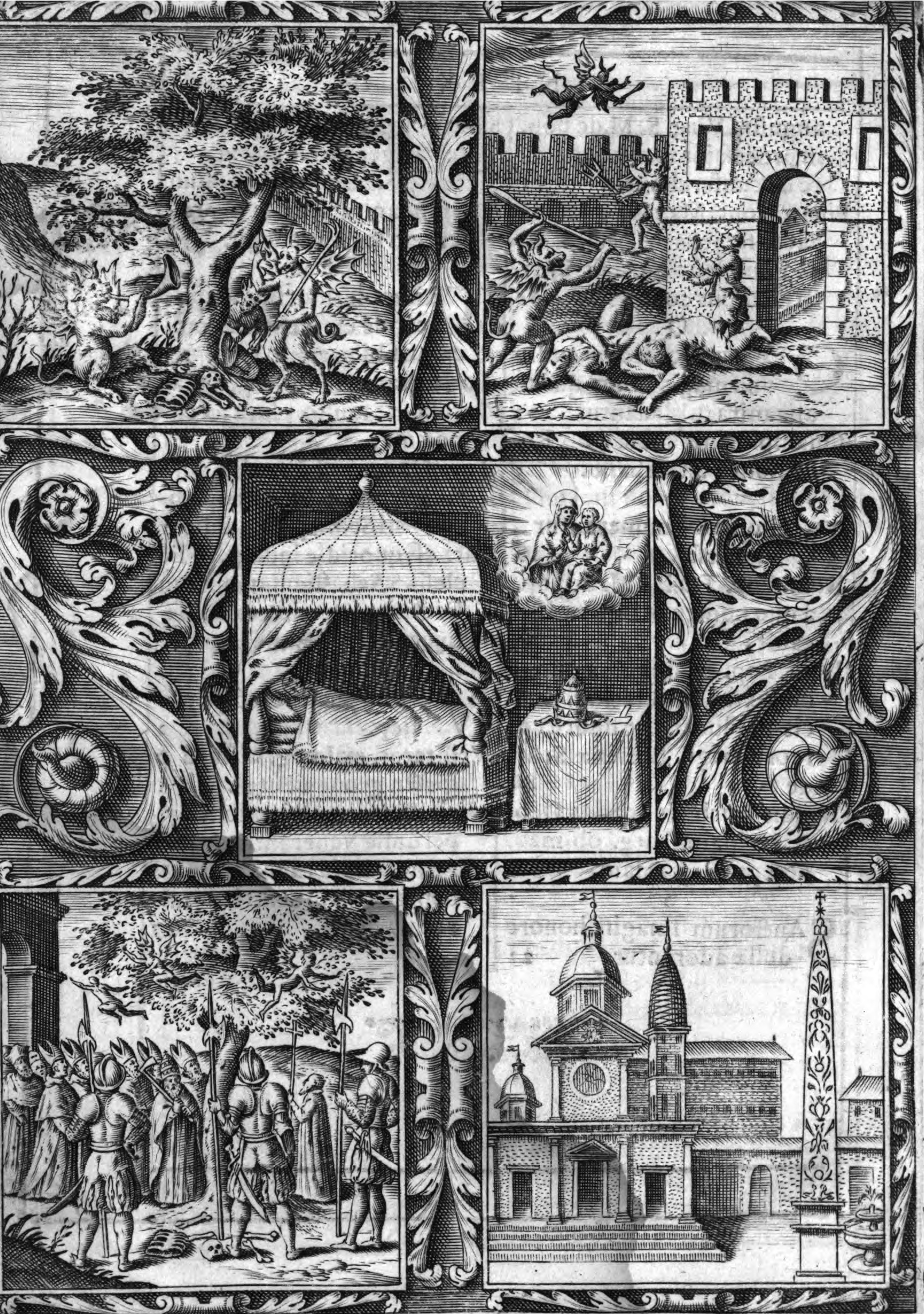
The foundation legend of the church, in an engraving from Giacomo Alberici's book (1599)

=== Legendary founding ===
The well-known foundation legend of Santa Maria del Popolo revolves around the evil memory of Emperor Nero and the cleansing of the area from this malicious legacy by Pope Paschal II. As the story goes, after his suicide Nero was buried in the mausoleum of his paternal family, the Domitii Ahenobarbi, at the foot of the Pincian Hill. The sepulchre was later buried under a landslide and on its ruins grew a huge walnut tree that "was so tall and sublime that no other plant exceeded it in any ways." The tree soon became the haunt for a multitude of vicious demons harassing the inhabitants of the area and also the travelers arriving in the city from the north through Porta Flaminia: "some were being frightened, possessed, cruelly beaten and injured, others almost strangled, or miserably killed."

As the demons endangered an important access road of the city and also upset the entire population, the newly elected pontiff, Paschal II, was seriously concerned. He "saw the flock of Christ committed to his watch, becoming prey to the infernal wolves." The Pope fasted and prayed for three days and at the end of that period, exhausted, he dreamt of the Blessed Virgin Mary, who detailed instructions to free the city from the demonic scourge.

On the Thursday after the Third Sunday of Lent in 1099, the Pope organised the entire clergy and populace of Rome into an impressive procession that, with the crucifix at its head, went along the urban stretch of the Via Flaminia until it reached the infested place. There, Paschal II performed the rite of exorcism and then struck the walnut tree with a determined blow to its root, causing the evil spirits to burst forth, madly screaming. When the whole tree was removed, the remains of Nero were discovered among the ruins; the Pope ordered these thrown into the Tiber.

Finally liberated from the demons, that corner of Rome could be devoted to Christian worship. Paschal II, to the sound of hymns, placed the first stone of an altar at the former site of the walnut tree. This was incorporated into a simple chapel which was completed in three days. The construction was celebrated with particular solemnity: the Pope consecrated the small sanctuary in the presence of a large crowd, accompanied by ten cardinals, four archbishops, ten bishops, and other prelates. He also granted the chapel many relics and dedicated it to the Virgin Mary.

=== Historical origins ===
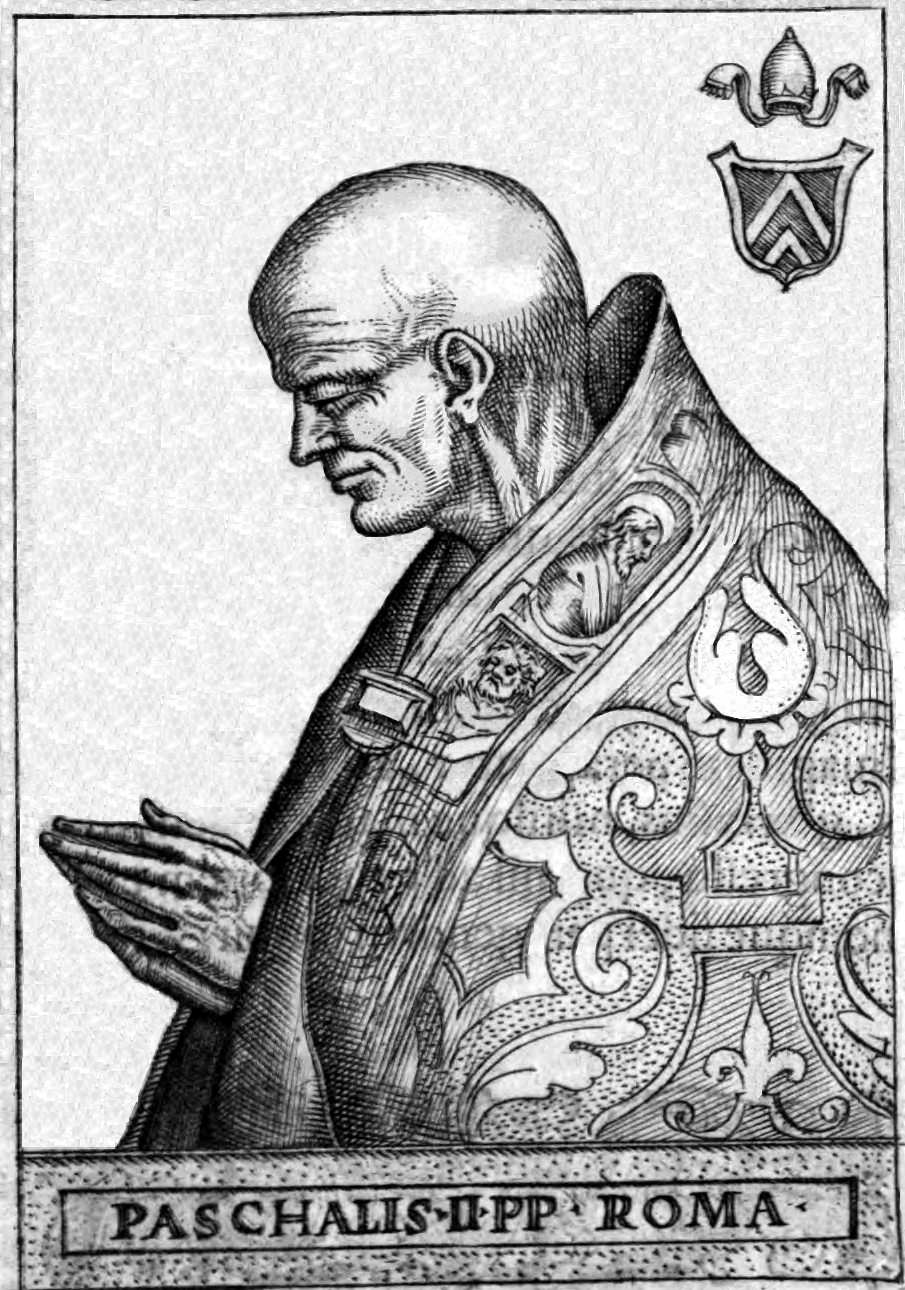
Pope Paschal II

The legend was recounted by an Augustinian friar, Giacomo Alberici in his treatise about the Church of Santa Maria del Popolo which was published in Rome in 1599 and translated into Italian the next year. Another Augustinian, Ambrogio Landucci rehashed the same story in his book about the origins of the basilica in 1646. The legend has been retold several times ever since with slight changes in collections of Roman curiosities, scientific literature and guidebooks. An example of the variations could be found in Ottavio Panciroli's book which claimed that the demons inhabiting the tree took the form of black crows. It is not known how far the tradition goes back but in 1726 in the archive of Santa Maria del Popolo there was a catalogue of the holy relics of the church written in 1426 which contained a (lost) version of the "miracle of the walnut tree". This was allegedly copied from an even more ancient tabella at the main altar. In the 15th century the story was already popular enough to be recounted by various German sources like Nikolaus Muffel's Description of Rome (1452) or The Pilgrimage of Arnold Von Harff (1497).

The factual basis of the legend is weak. Nero was indeed buried in the mausoleum of his paternal family, but Suetonius in his Life of Nero writes that "the family tomb of the Domitii [was] on the summit of the Hill of Gardens, which is visible from the Campus Martius." The location of the mausoleum was therefore somewhere on the higher north-west slopes of the Pincian Hill and certainly not at the foot of it where the church stands.

The foundation of the chapel by Paschal II was maybe part of an effort to restore the safety of the area around Porta Flaminia which was outside the inhabited core of medieval Rome and certainly infested with bandits. Another possible source of inspiration for the legend could have been the well-documented revenge of Pope Paschal II on the body of his opponent, Antipope Clement III. The pope seized the city of Civita Castellana, had Clement's cadaver exhumed from his tomb, and ordered it thrown into the Tiber. Clement III was the protégée of the Holy Roman Emperor Henry IV who was often called "Nero" by the papal party.

=== Etymology ===
The name del Popolo ("of the people") was most probably derived from populus meaning large rural parish in medieval Latin. In this case the name refers to the first suburban settlement around Via Flaminia that was formed after the chapel had been built in this previously deserted part of Campus Martius. Others think the denomination implied that the people of Rome were saved from the demonic scourge or it came from the Latin word pōpulus, meaning poplar. The demonic tree was a huge walnut but there might have been poplar trees growing on ancient tombs in the locality. The name S. Maria ad Flaminiam appeared in some 15th-century documents.

=== Early history ===
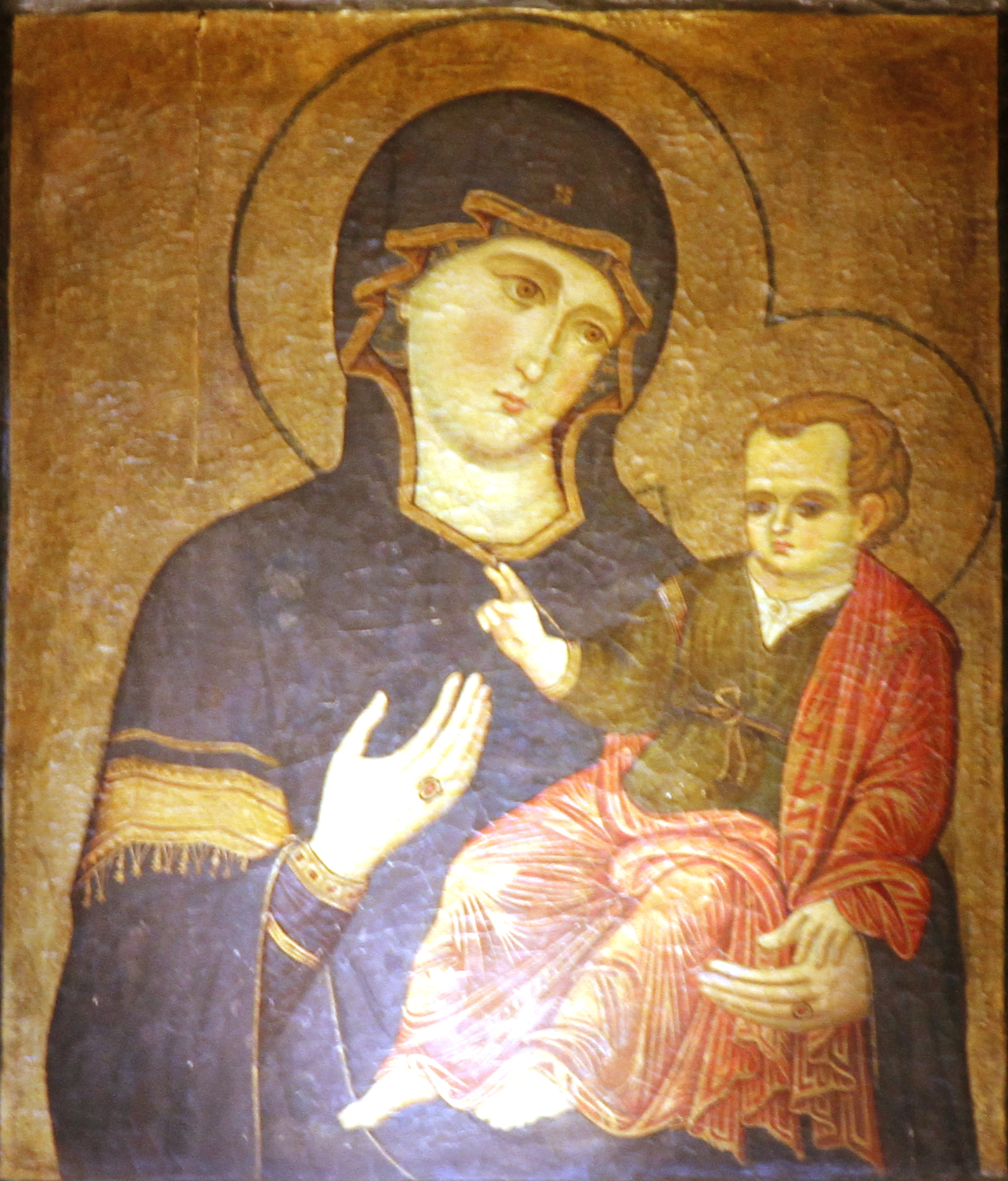
The icon of Madonna del Popolo

The name of Santa Maria del Popolo is missing in the catalogue of the churches of Rome which was written by Cencio Camerario in 1192. Later tradition held that the miraculous image of Our Lady, painted by St. Luke himself, was moved to the church by Pope Gregory IX from the Sancta Sanctorum in the Lateran. This happened after a flood of the Tiber – probably the great flood in 1230 – caused a horrible plague in the city. The pope convoked the cardinals, the whole clergy and the people of Rome and the icon was transferred in a solemn procession to Santa Maria del Popolo. After that the plague ceased and the tranquility of the city was restored. The Madonna del Popolo has certainly remained one of the most popular Marian icons through the centuries, attracted many pilgrims and assured a greater role to the geographically still remote church. In 2018, it was announced that the icon was a work of Filippo Rusuti, whose signature was discovered on the image during restoration.

The early history of Santa Maria del Popolo is almost unknown because the archives of the church were dispersed during the Napoleonic era and few documents survived from before 1500. The first references in archival sources are from the 13th century. The Catalogue of Paris (compiled around 1230 or 1272–76) listing the churches of Rome already contains the name of Santa Maria de Populo. There may have been a small Franciscan community living by the church until around 1250 but it is possible that they stayed there only temporarily.

=== The Augustinians ===
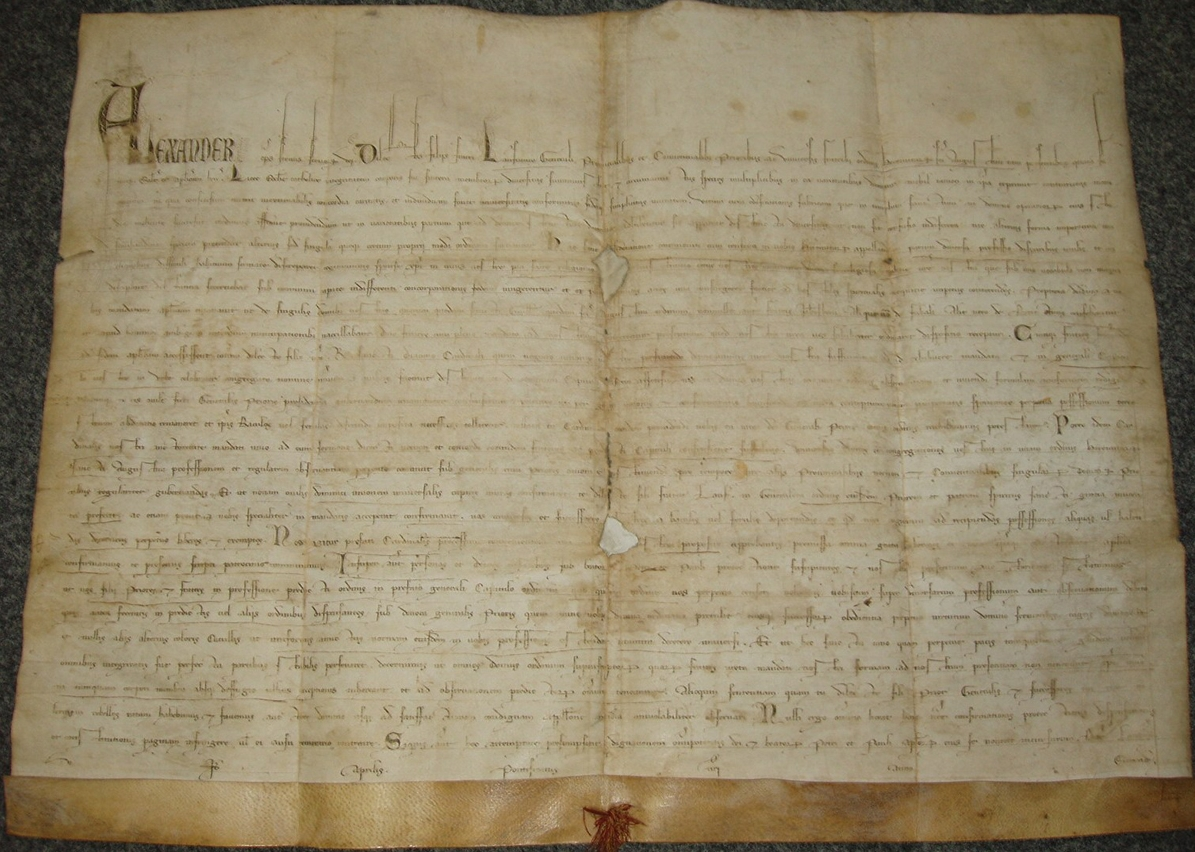
The bull Licet Ecclesiae issued by Pope Alexander IV on 9 April 1256 that established the order

In the middle of the 13th century the church was given to the Order of Saint Augustine which has maintained it ever since. The Augustinians were a new mendicant order established under the guidance of Cardinal Riccardo Annibaldi, probably the most influential member of the Roman Curia at the time. Annibaldi was appointed corrector and provisor of the Tuscan hermits by Pope Innocent IV in December 1243. The cardinal convened a meeting to Santa Maria del Popolo for the delegates of the hermitic communities where they declared their union and the foundation of the new order that the Pope confirmed with the bull Pia desideria on 31 March 1244.

A few years later a community of friars was established by the church and the Franciscans were compensated for their loss with the monastery of Ara Coeli. This probably happened in 1250 or 1251. The so-called Grand Union that integrated various other hermitic communities with the Tuscans by the order of Pope Alexander IV was also established on the general chapter held in Santa Maria del Popolo under the supervision of Cardinal Annibaldi in March 1256. The strong connection between the Annibaldi family and the church was attested on an inscription that mentioned two noble ladies of the family, Caritia and Gulitia who set up some kind of marble monument in the basilica in 1263. The Catalogue of Turin (c. 1320) stated that the monastery had 12 friars from the order of the hermits at the time.

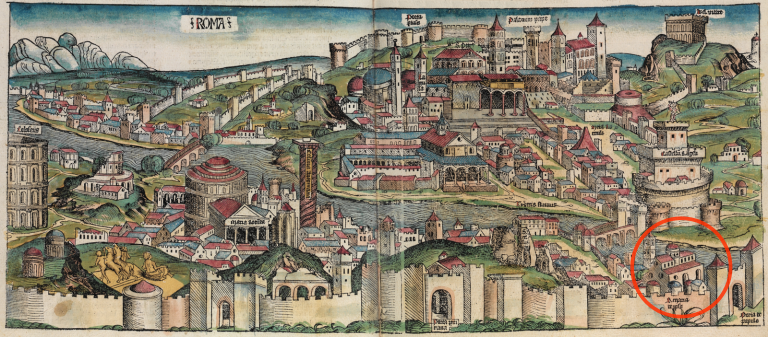
Idealized depiction of Rome from the 1493 Nuremberg Chronicle, with the Santa Maria del Popolo circled in red

In his bull Dum praecelsa Pope Boniface IX on 30 August 1400 granted a special indulgence to those who offered alms for the construction of a new tabernacle above the miraculous image of the Virgin. A marble relief depicting the Coronation of the Virgin (now preserved in the sacristy corridor) could have been part of a Gothic ciborium or cella built for the icon after that papal concession.

In the 15th century the friary of Santa Maria del Popolo joined the observant reform movement that tried to restore the original purity of monastic life. The general chapter of the Augustinian observants in May 1449 established five separate congregations for the observant friars in Italy. That of Rome-Perugia was sometimes named after Santa Maria del Popolo although the monastery never had the official position of a mother-house. In 1472 the friary was given over by Pope Sixtus IV to the Lombard Congregation, the most important and populous of all, and it became its Roman headquarter and the seat of its procurator general (ambassador) at the Roman Curia.

=== The Sistine reconstruction ===
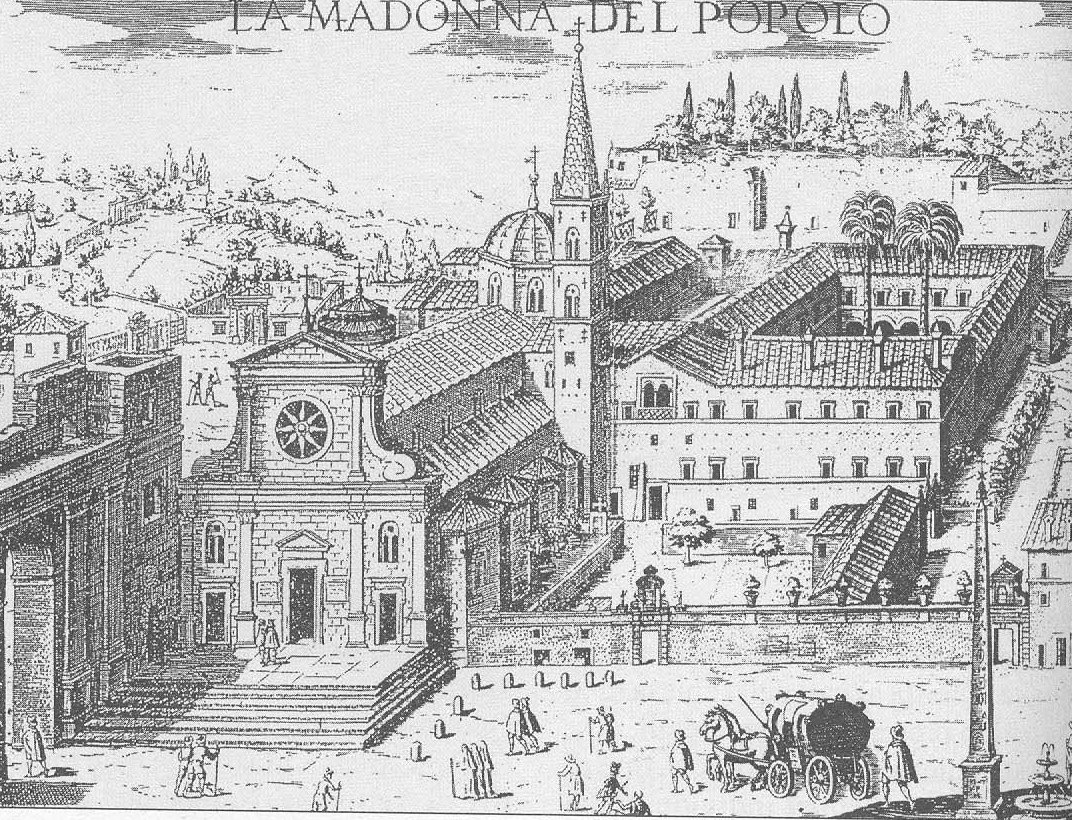
The church in its original form on Giovanni Maggi's copper engraving (1625)

Soon after its transfer to the prestigious Lombard Congregation Santa Maria del Popolo was reconstructed between 1472 and 1477 on the orders of Pope Sixtus IV. This was part of the ambitious urban renovation program of the pope who presented himself as Urbis Restaurator of Rome. The medieval church was entirely demolished and a new three-aisled, Latin cross shaped basilica was built with four identical chapels on both sides, an octagonal dome above the crossing and a tall Lombard style bell-tower at the end of the right transept. The result of this reconstruction was an early and excellent example of Italian Renaissance architecture in Rome. In spite of the many later changes the basilica essentially kept its Sistine form until today.

The architect or architects of this innovative project remain unknown due to a lack of contemporary sources. Giorgio Vasari in his Lives attributed all the important papal projects in Rome during Sixtus IV to a Florentine, Baccio Pontelli including the basilica and monastery of Santa Maria del Popolo. Modern researchers deemed this claim highly dubious and proposed other names among them Andrea Bregno, a Lombard sculptor and architect whose workshop certainly received important commissions in the basilica. The fundamental differences between the façade and the interior suggest that maybe more than one architect was working on the building.

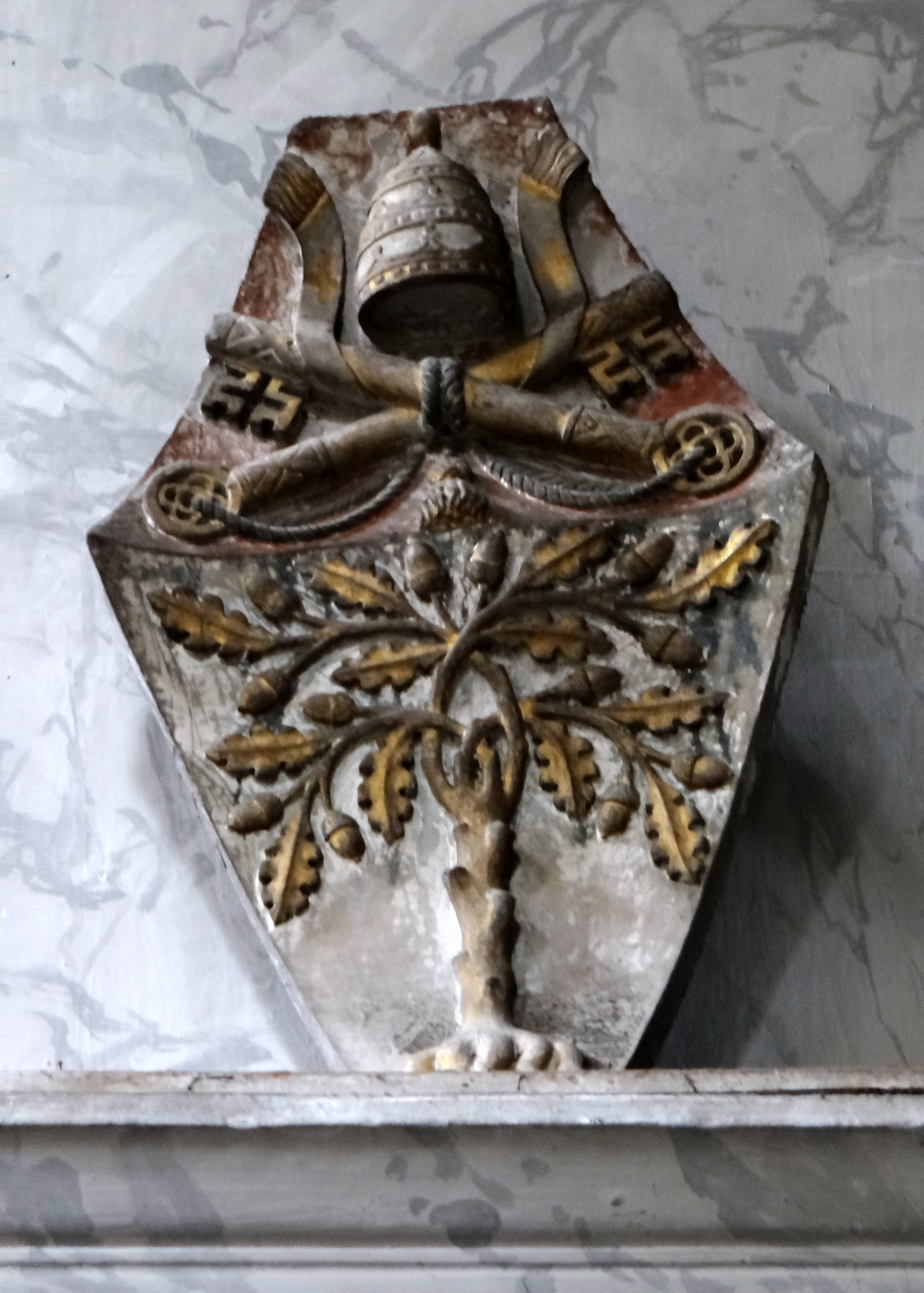
The arms of Pope Sixtus IV in the nave

The year of completion is indicated on the inscriptions above the side doors of the façade. The one on the left reads "SIXTUS·PP·IIII·FVNDAVIT·1477", the other on the right reads "SIXTUS·PP·IIII·PONT·MAX·1477". Jacopo da Volterra recorded in his diary that the pope visited the church that "he rebuilt from the ground up a few years ago" in 1480. The pope was so strongly attached to the church, that he went there to pray every Saturday and celebrated mass in the papal chapel every year on September 6, the feast of the Nativity of the Virgin. On 2 June 1481 when the rumour about the death of Mehmed the Conqueror was confirmed, the pope went to the Vespers at Santa Maria del Popolo in thanksgiving with the cardinals and the ambassadors. Another occasion when the pope celebrated an important event in the basilica was the victory of the papal troops against the Neapolitans at Campomorto on 21 August 1482.

The reconstruction also had a symbolic message that the evil walnut tree of Nero was supplanted by the beneficent oak of the Della Rovere. The papal coats of arms were placed on the façade and the vaults as "symbols of eternal happiness and protection from lightning", as Landucci explained praising the transposition of the two trees. Another important aspect of the Sistine reconstruction was that it made the basilica – the first church for the pilgrims arriving in Rome from the North – a dynastic monument of the Della Rovere family. This was reinforced by relatives of the pope and other personages of his court who bought chapels and built funeral monuments. "Santa Maria del Popolo became a place to unite visually the universal domination of the church with the della Rovere, a totemic symbol that would associate the della Rovere with Rome and allowed them to co-opt its magnificience and glory", claimed Lisa Passaglia Bauman.

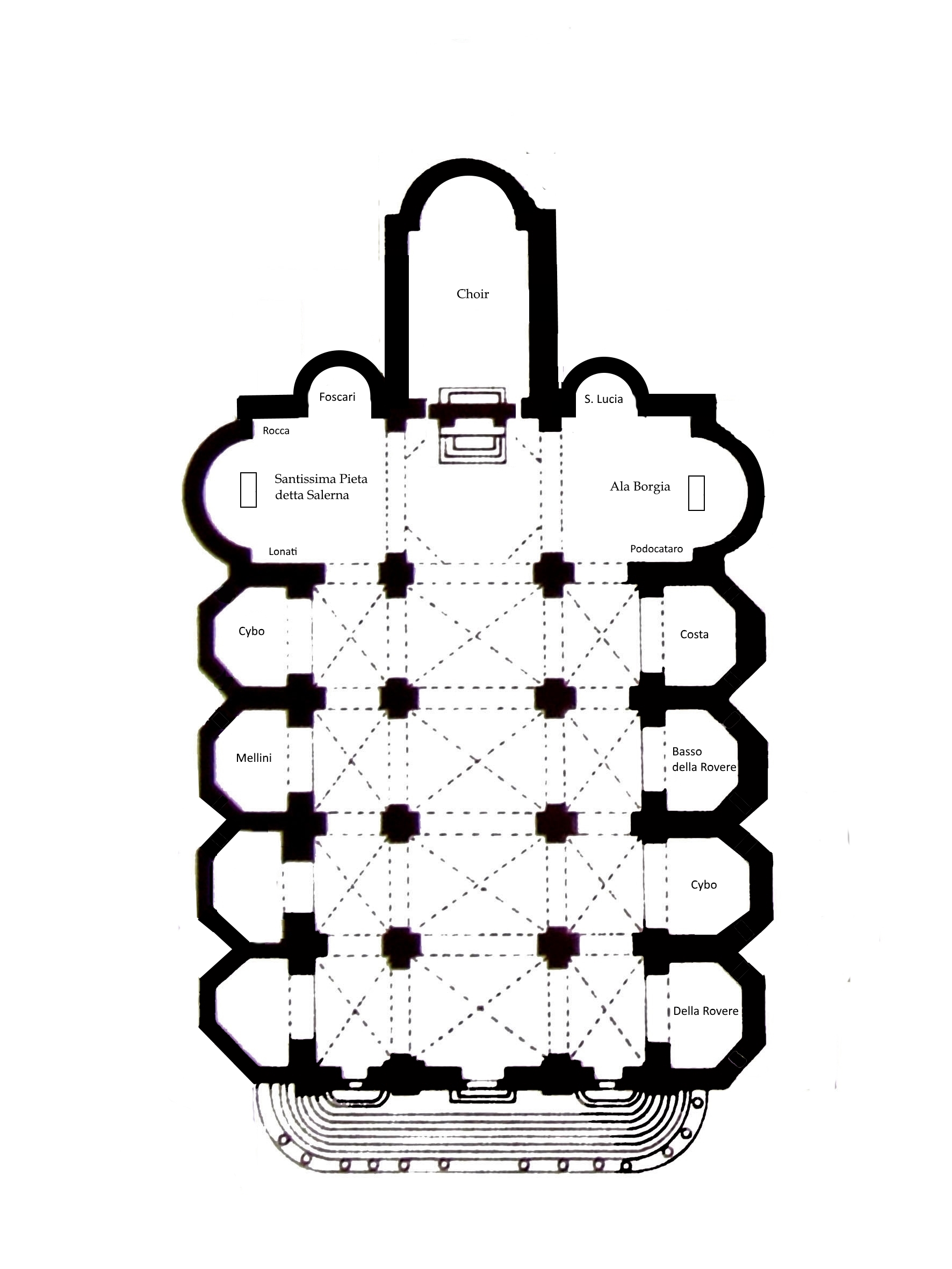
The plan of the basilica in its original quattrocento form; the shape of the choir and the transept is uncertain

The new high altar for the icon of the Madonna was commissioned by Cardinal Giuliano della Rovere, the nephew of the pope, or Cardinal Rodrigo Borgia in 1473. Another relative, Cardinal Domenico della Rovere bought two chapels on the right side. He transformed the first one into a funeral chapel and sold the other one to Cardinal Jorge da Costa in 1488. The next papal family, the Cybos furnished the second chapel on the right in the 1490s, and also the third chapel on the left, while the third chapel on the right went to another cardinal-nephew of Pope Sixtus, Girolamo Basso della Rovere. In the first chapel on the left a confidant of the pope, Bishop Giovanni Montemirabile was buried in 1479. Another confidant, Cardinal Giovanni Battista Mellini was buried in the third chapel on the left after his death in 1478. The two artists most closely associated with this period of the church were the sculptor Andrea Bregno and the painter Pinturicchio.

The basilica retained its importance in the Borgia era. When the Pope's son, the Duke of Gandia was murdered in June 1497, the body was laid in state and buried in the basilica. Other members of the family and their circle were also buried in the transept, including Vannozza dei Cattanei, the former mistress of Alexander VI in 1518, and the pope's secretary and physician, Ludovico Podocataro in 1504.

=== The Julian extension ===
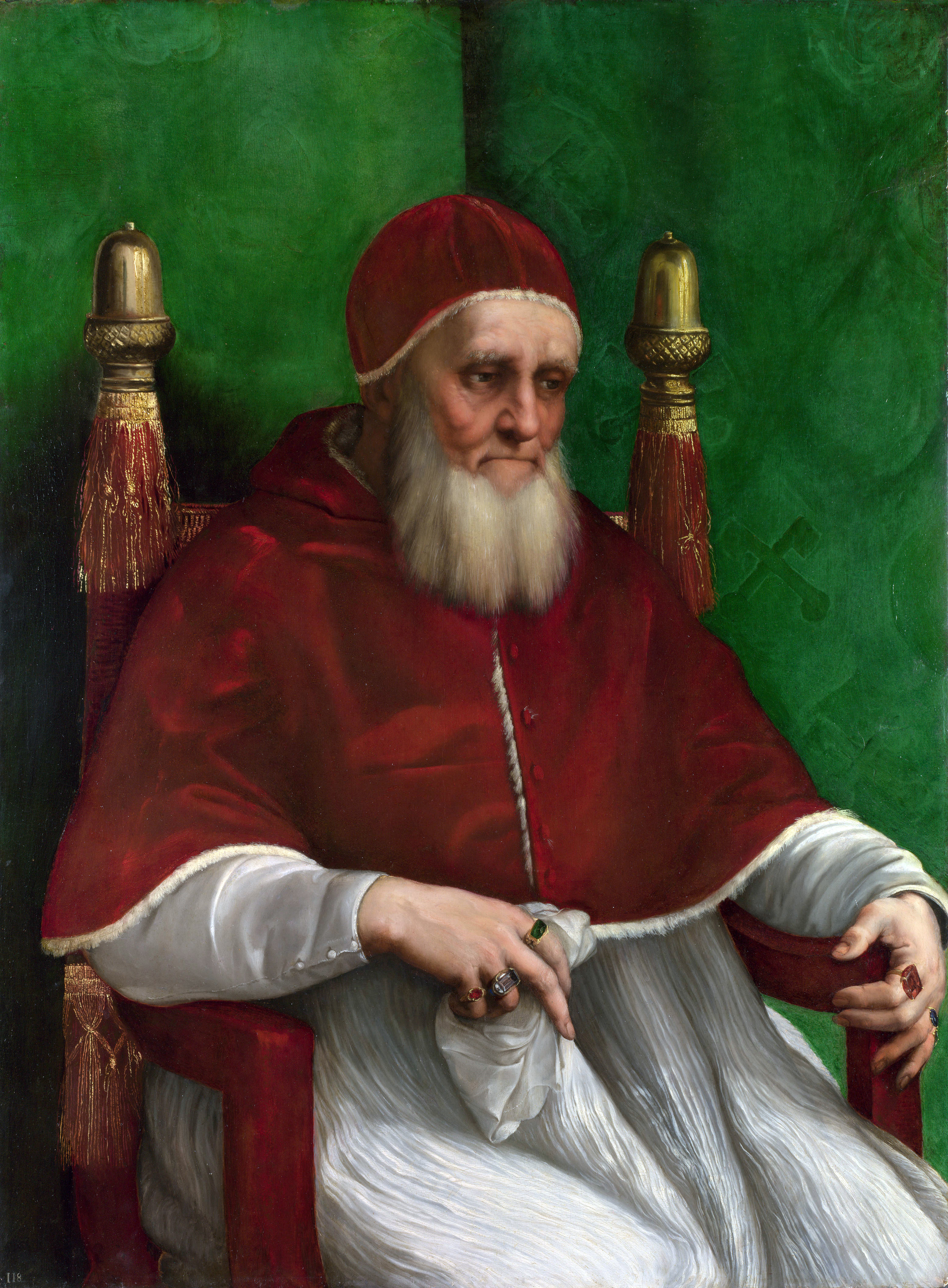
Raphael, Pope Julius II, National Gallery

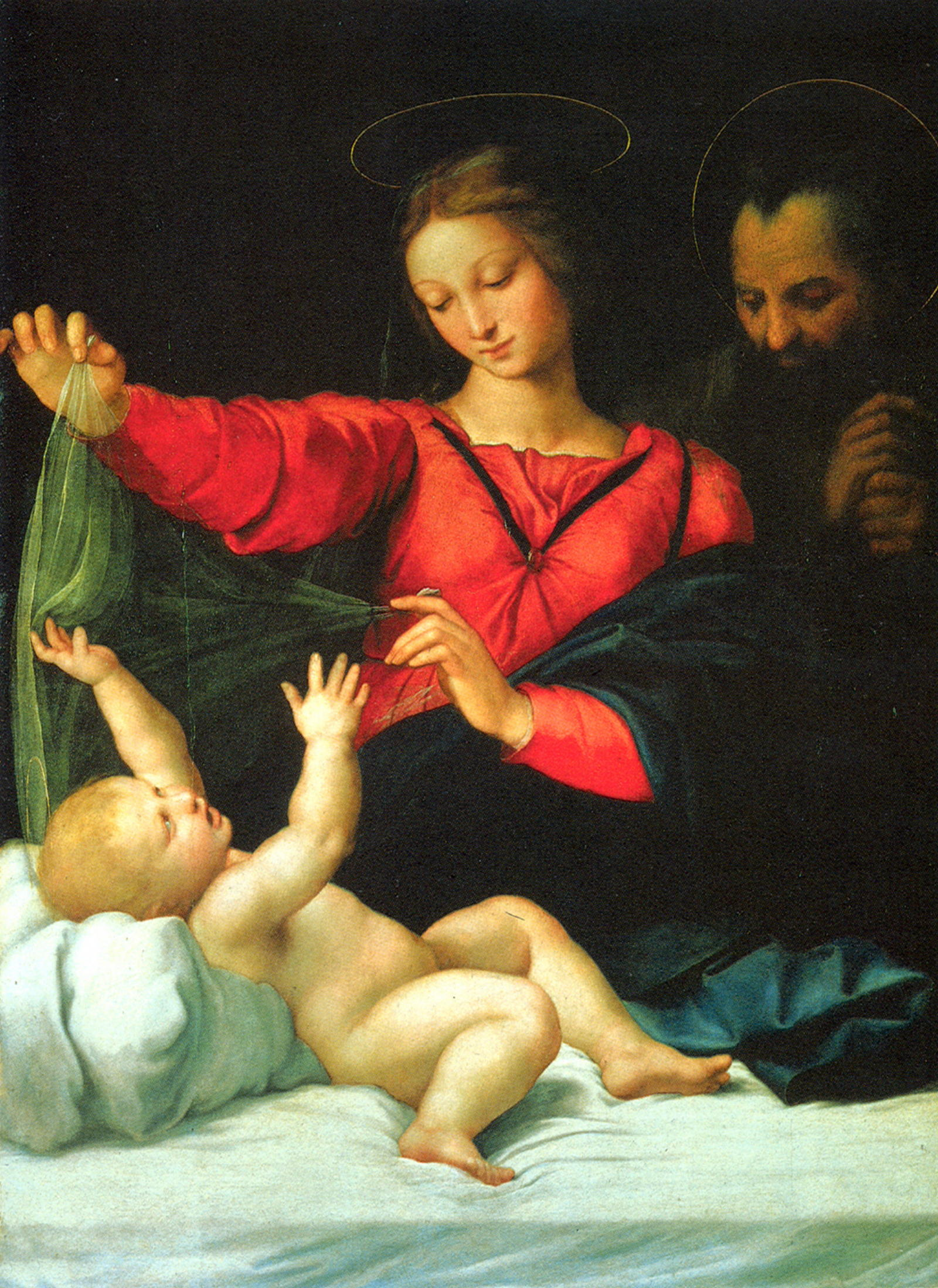
Raphael, Madonna of the Veil

With the election of another Della Rovere cardinal, Julius II in 1503, the Basilica of Santa Maria del Popolo again became the favourite church of the reigning pope. Julius was strongly devoted to the icon of Madonna del Popolo but he was also strongly devoted to increasing the glory of his dynasty. For these reasons he took up the work of his uncle and built a spacious new choir between 1505 and 1510 behind the main altar. The project was entrusted to his favourite architect, Donato Bramante. The choir was built in High Renaissance style, and it was decorated with the frescoes of Pinturicchio on the sail vault and the stained glass windows of Guillaume de Marcillat. It was also used as a mausoleum where Andrea Sansovino created two monumental tombs for Cardinal Girolamo Basso della Rovere (†1507), the favourite cousin of the pope, and Cardinal Ascanio Sforza (†1505), his former rival.

There was another important commission for Raphael. He painted the Madonna of the Veil, a portrayal of the Holy Family (c. 1508), and the Portrait of Pope Julius II (c. 1511) to be displayed at the church. There are references from the 1540s and later that the pair of highly prestigious votive images were occasionally hanged on the pillars for feast days but otherwise they were probably kept in the sacristy. Unfortunately in 1591 both paintings were removed from the church by Paolo Emilio Sfondrati and later sold off.

Julius II granted assent to the wealthy Sienese banker, Agostino Chigi, who was adopted into the Della Rovere family, to build a mausoleum replacing the second side chapel on the left in 1507. The chapel was dedicated to the Virgin of Loreto whose cult was ardently promoted by the Della Rovere popes. The Chigi Chapel was designed by Raphael and it was partially completed in 1516 but remained unfinished for a very long time. This ambitious project created a strong connection between the basilica and the Chigis that extended well into the next century.

In the Julian era the church became again the location of important papal ceremonies. The pope launched his first campaign here on 26 August 1506 and when he returned to Rome after the successful Northern Italian war, he spent the night of 27 March 1507 in the convent of Santa Maria del Popolo. On the next day Julius celebrated High Mass on Palm Sunday in the church that was decorated with fronds of palm and olive branches. The ceremony was followed by a triumphal entry into the city. On 5 October 1511 the Holy League against France was solemnly proclaimed in the basilica. On 25 November 1512 the alliance of the pope with Emperor Maximilian I was also announced in this church in the presence of fifty-two diplomatic envoys and fifteen cardinals. The pope also visited the Madonna del Popolo for private reasons like when he prayed for the recovery of his favourite nephew, Galeotto Franciotti della Rovere in early September 1508.

=== Luther's visit ===
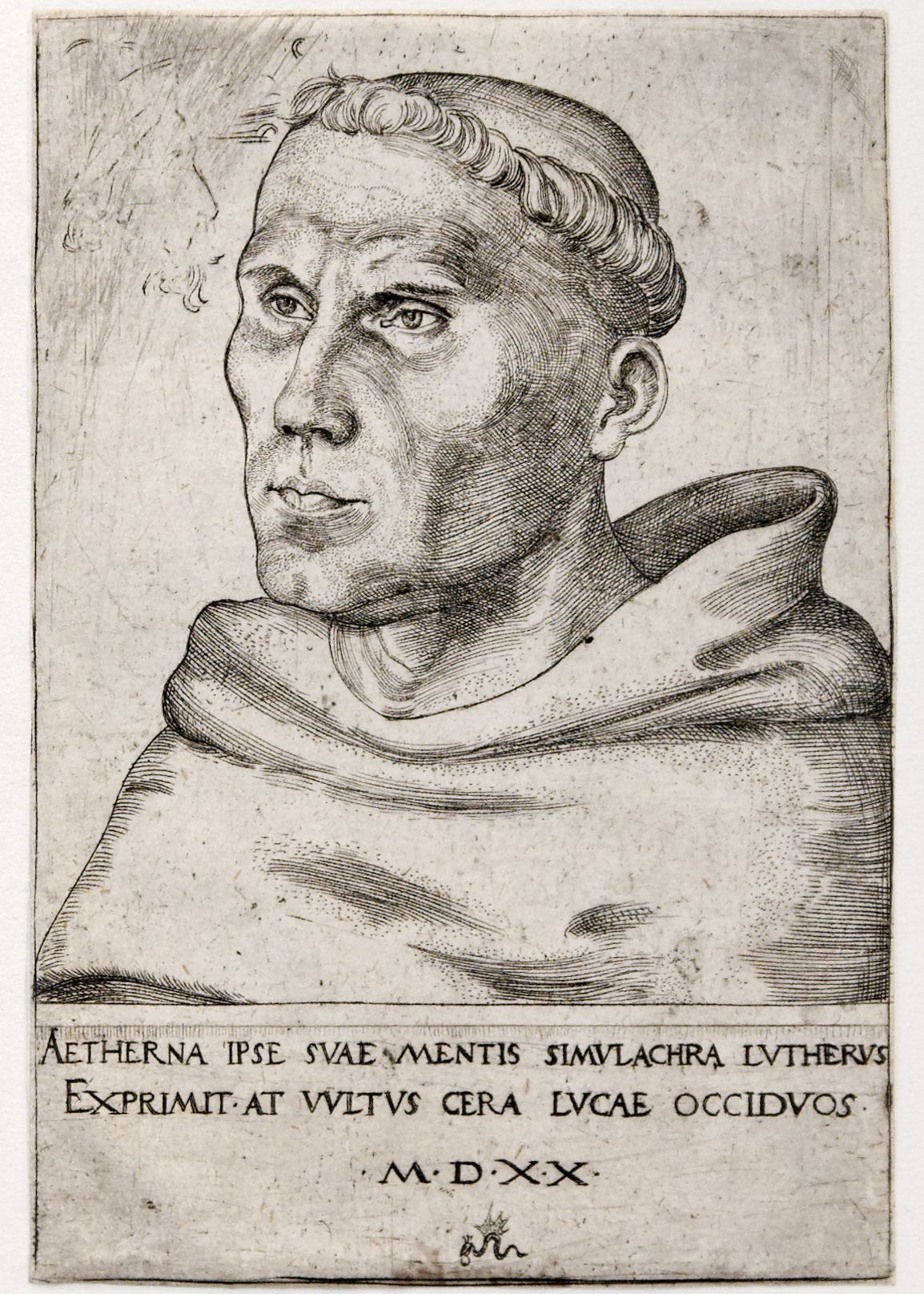
Luther as an Augustinian friar

Luther's journey to Rome as young Augustinian friar is a famous episode of his life period before the Reformation. Although his stay in the city became the stuff of legends, the circumstances and details of this journey are surprisingly murky due to a scarcity of authentic sources. Even the traditional date (1510/11) was questioned recently when Hans Schneider suggested that the trip happened a year later in 1511/12.

What is certain that the journey was connected to a feud between the Observant and the Conventual monasteries of the Augustinian Order in the Holy Roman Empire and their proposed union. According to the traditional dating Luther arrived in Rome between 25 December 1510 and January 1511. His biographer, Heinrich Böhmer assumed that the young observant friar stayed in the monastery of Santa Maria del Popolo. This assumption was disputed by newer biographers who argued that the tense relationship between the Lombardian Congregation and the administration of the Augustinian order made the monastery of Santa Maria del Popolo an unsuitable lodging for Luther who tried to win a favour at the leaders of his order. Be that as it may, Luther, who spent four weeks in Rome, certainly visited the only observant Augustinian monastery in the city and its famous pilgrimage church that was the favourite of the reigning pope.

=== The parish ===
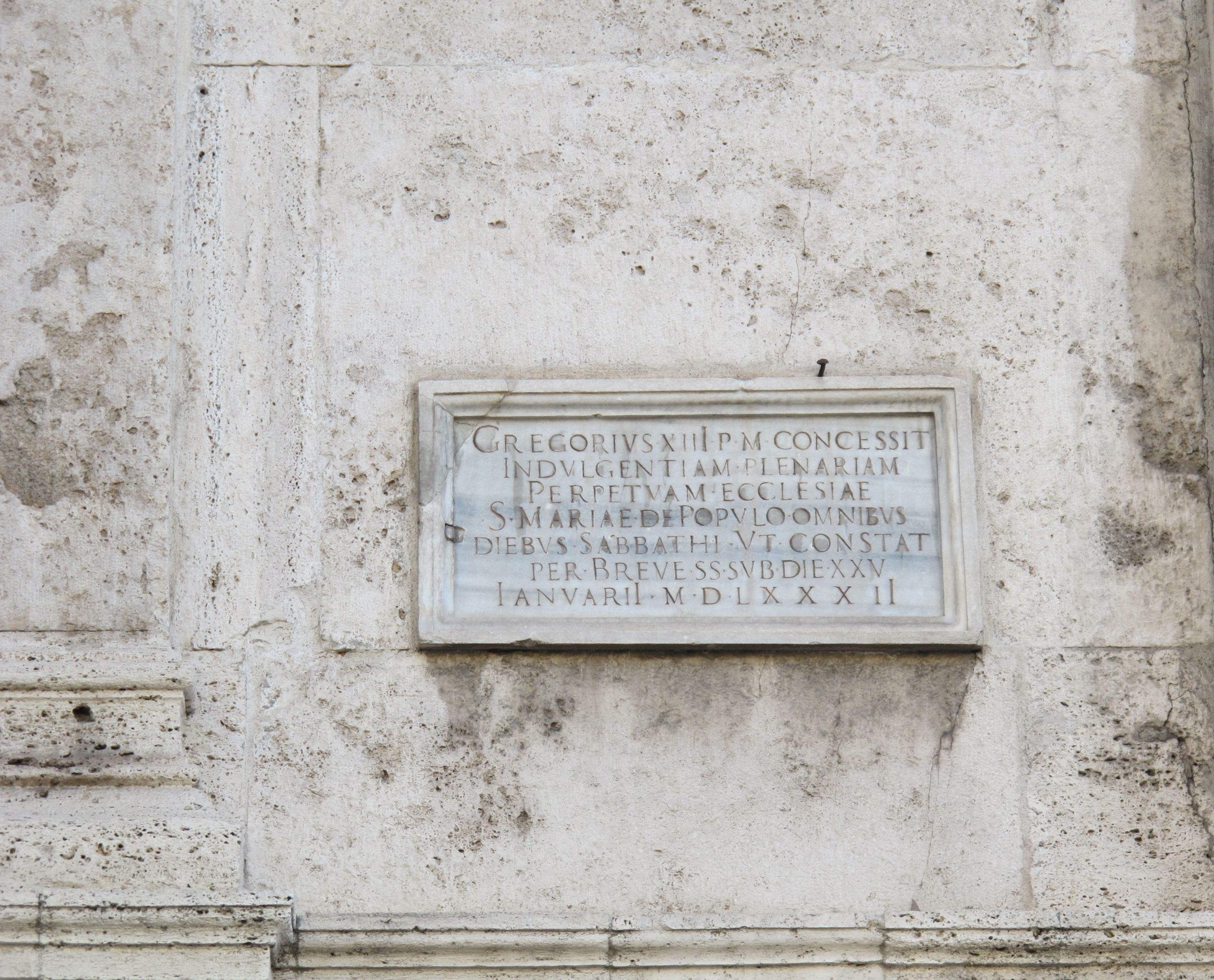
Inscription commemorating the indulgences that Pope Gregory XIII conceded in 1582

After the Della Rovere era, the basilica lost its prominent role as a papal church but it remained one of the most important pilgrimage churches in the city. This was shown on 23 November 1561 when Pope Pius IV held a solemn procession from St. Peter's to the Basilica of Santa Maria del Popolo on the occasion of reopening the Council of Trent. Building works went on in the Chigi Chapel in a slow pace until the 1550s. The last important Renaissance addition was the Theodoli Chapel between 1555 and 1575 with rich stucco and fresco decoration by Giulio Mazzoni.

At the same time the basilica became a parish church when Pope Pius IV created the Parish of St. Andrew "outside Porta Flaminia" with the motu proprio Sacri apostolatus on 1 January 1561 and united it in perpetuity with the Augustinian priory. The care of the new parish was entrusted to the friars and Pope Pius V moved the seat of the parish to Santa Maria del Popolo. The parish still exists encompassing a large area comprising the southern part of the Flaminio district, the Pincian Hill and the northernmost part of the historic centre around Piazza del Popolo. The basilica was made a titular church on 13 April 1587 by Pope Sixtus V with the apostolic constitution Religiosa. The first cardinal priest of the titulus was Cardinal Tolomeo Gallio. Pope Sixtus V also enhanced the liturgical importance of the basilica elevating it for the rank of station church in his 13 February 1586 bull which revived the ancient custom of the Stations. (This role was lost in modern times.) The same pope included the church among the Seven Pilgrim Churches of Rome instead of the inconveniently located basilica of San Sebastiano fuori le mura.

In April 1594 Pope Clement VIII ordered the removal of the tomb of Vannozza dei Cattanei, the mistress of Alexander VI, from the basilica because the memory of the Borgias was a stain on the history of the Catholic Church for the reformed papacy and all the visible traces had to disappear.

=== Caravaggio and the Chigi reconstruction ===
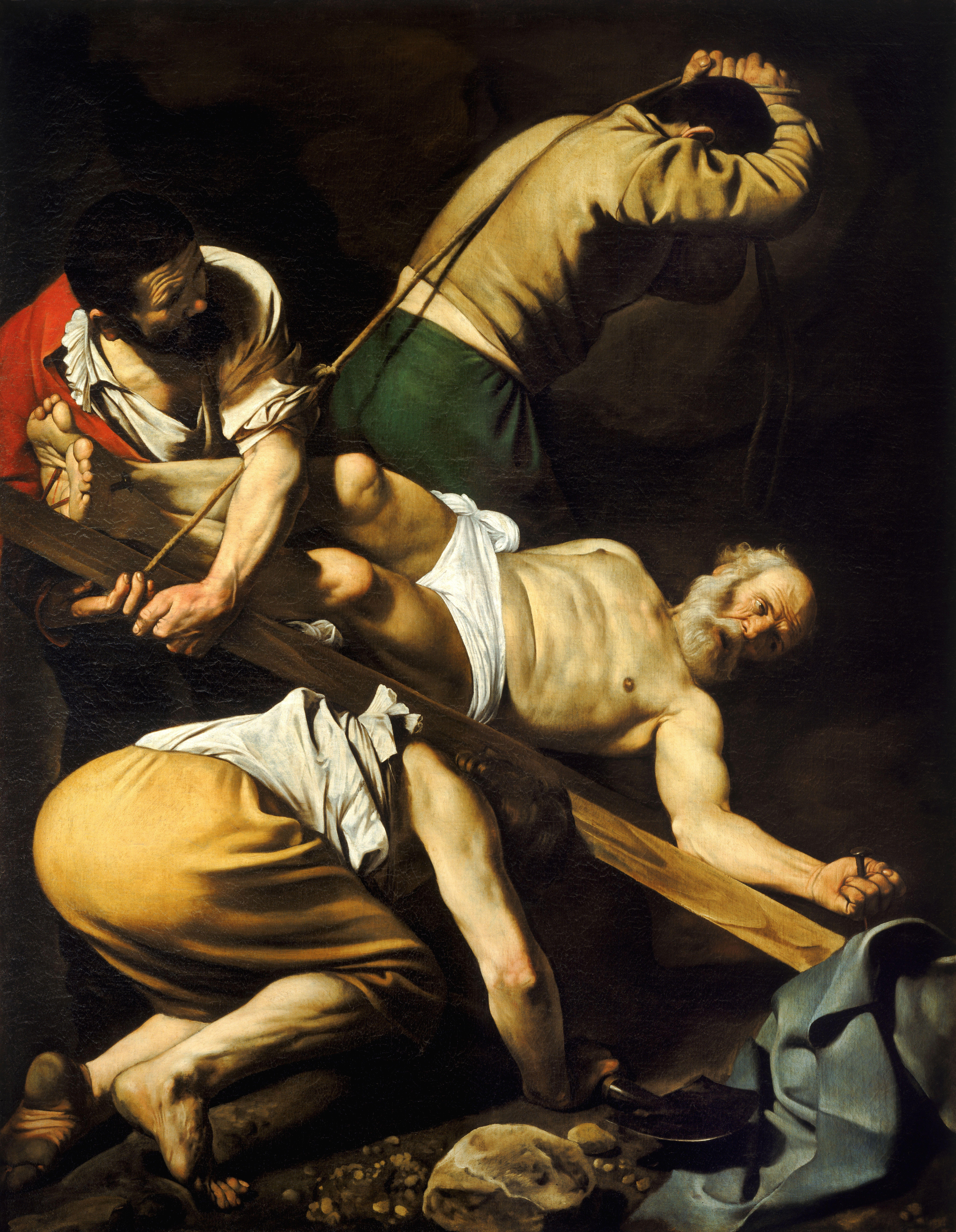
The Crucifixion of Saint Peter by Caravaggio

On 8 July 1600 Monsignor Tiberio Cerasi, Treasurer-General of Pope Clement VIII purchased the patronage right of the old Foscari Chapel in the left transept and soon demolished it. The new Cerasi Chapel was designed by Carlo Maderno between 1600 and 1601, and it was decorated with two large Baroque canvases by Caravaggio, the Conversion of Saint Paul and the Crucifixion of Saint Peter. These are the most important works of art in the basilica, and unrivalled high points of Western art. A third painting is also significant, the Assumption of the Virgin by Annibale Carracci which was set on the altar.

During the first half of the 17th century there were no other significant building works in the basilica but many Baroque funeral monuments were erected in the side chapels and the aisles, the most famous among them the tomb of Cardinal Giovanni Garzia Mellini by Alessandro Algardi from 1637 to 1638. Two noteworthy fresco cycles were added by Giovanni da San Giovanni in the Mellini Chapel, that the owner family restored in the 1620s, and by Pieter van Lint in the Chapel of Innocenzo Cybo in the 1630s.

A new wave of construction began when Fabio Chigi became the cardinal priest of the church in 1652. He immediately began the reconstruction of the neglected family chapel which was embellished by Gian Lorenzo Bernini. In 1655 Chigi was elected pope under the name Alexander VII. He repeatedly checked the progress of the work; there was a papal visit on 4 March 1656, 10 February and 3 March 1657. Due to this personal supervision the project was speedily completed by the middle of 1657 but the last statue of Bernini was only put in place in 1661.

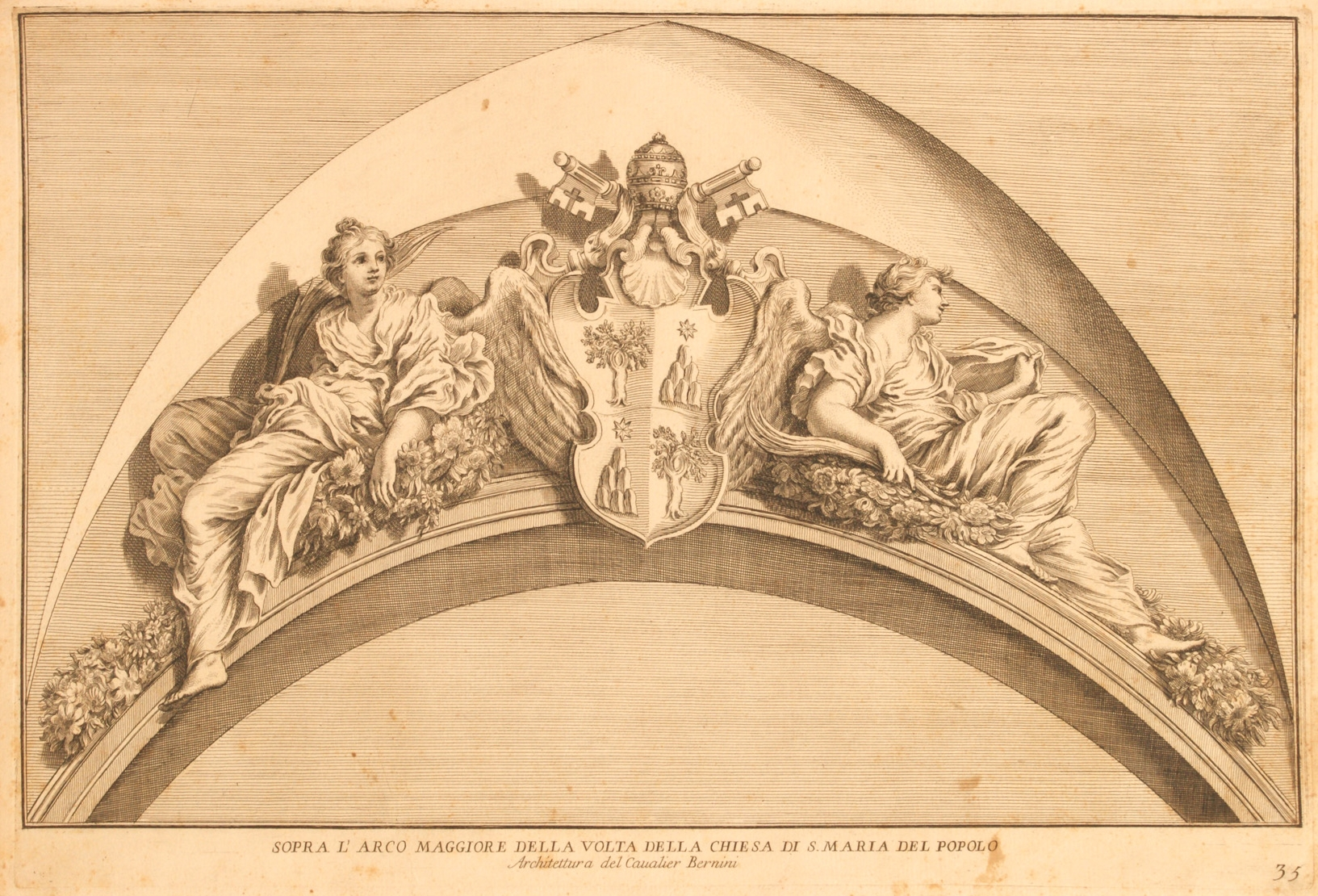
The Chigi arms with two Victories by Antonio Raggi in the nave

In the meantime the pope entrusted Bernini with the task of modernizing the old basilica in contemporary Baroque style. In March 1658 Alexander VII inspected the work in the company of the architect. This proved to be a significant rebuilding that altered the character of the quattrocento basilica. The façade was changed, larger windows were opened in the nave, statues, frescos and stucco decorations were added in the interior and a new main altar was erected. Two side altars and organ lofts were built in the transept where the old Borgia Chapel was demolished. Chigi coat-of-arms, symbols and inscriptions celebrated the glory of the pope everywhere.

The basilica almost reached its final form with the Berninian reconstruction. The last important addition happened during the pontificate of Innocent XI. His Secretary of State, Cardinal Alderano Cybo demolished the old family chapel (the second on the right) and built the sumptuous Baroque Cybo Chapel on its place that was designed by Carlo Fontana between 1682 and 1687. The large domed chapel was decorated with paintings by Carlo Maratta, Daniel Seiter and Luigi Garzi. It is regarded one of the most significant sacral monuments erected in Rome in the last quarter of the 17th century.

=== Later developments ===
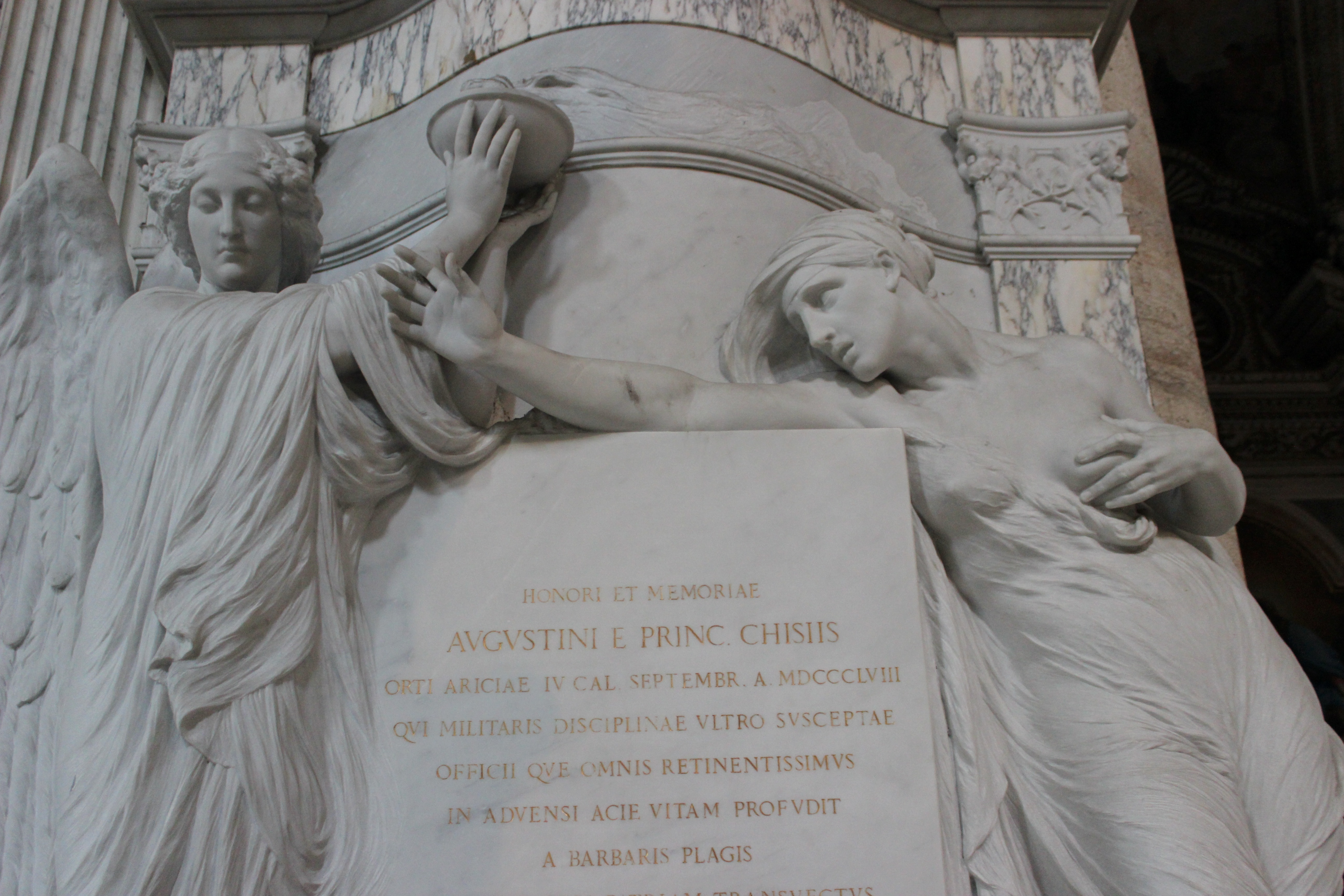
The monument to Agostino Chigi was the last monumental tomb, added in 1915

During the reign of Pope Clement XI the Basilica of Santa Maria del Popolo was the scene of a joyful ceremony. On 8 September 1716 the pope blessed a four feet long sword, adorned with the papal arms, that he sent as a gift to Prince Eugene of Savoy, the commander of the imperial army after the prince won the Battle of Petrovaradin against the Ottomans in the Austro–Turkish War.

The most visible 18th century addition to the basilica is the spectacular funeral monument for Princess Maria Flaminia Odescalchi Chigi, the young wife of Don Sigismondo Chigi Albani della Rovere. It was designed by Paolo Posi in 1772 and sometimes dubbed the "last Baroque tomb in Rome". By the time the church was full of valuable tombs and artworks, and there was not much room left for the 19th century. Nonetheless there were smaller interventions: the Cybo-Soderini Chapel was restored in 1825, the Feoli Chapel was completely redesigned in Neo-Renaissance style in 1857 and the monumental Art Nouveau tomb of Agostino Chigi by Adolfo Apolloni was erected in 1915. After that only repairs and restorations happened regularly; the first important modern intervention was conducted by Antonio Muñoz in 1912 with the aim to "restore the church to its beautiful quattrocento character" and removing many of the Baroque additions in the nave and the transept.

The urban setting of the basilica changed fundamentally between 1816 and 1824 when Giuseppe Valadier created the monumental Neo-Classical ensemble of Piazza del Popolo, commissioned by Pope Pius VII. The ancient monastery of the Augustinians was demolished, the extensive gardens were appropriated and a new monastery was erected on a much smaller footprint in Neo-Classical style. This building covered the whole right side of the basilica with its side chapels, wrapping around the base of the bell tower and reducing the visual prominence of the basilica on the square.

== Exterior ==
=== Façade ===
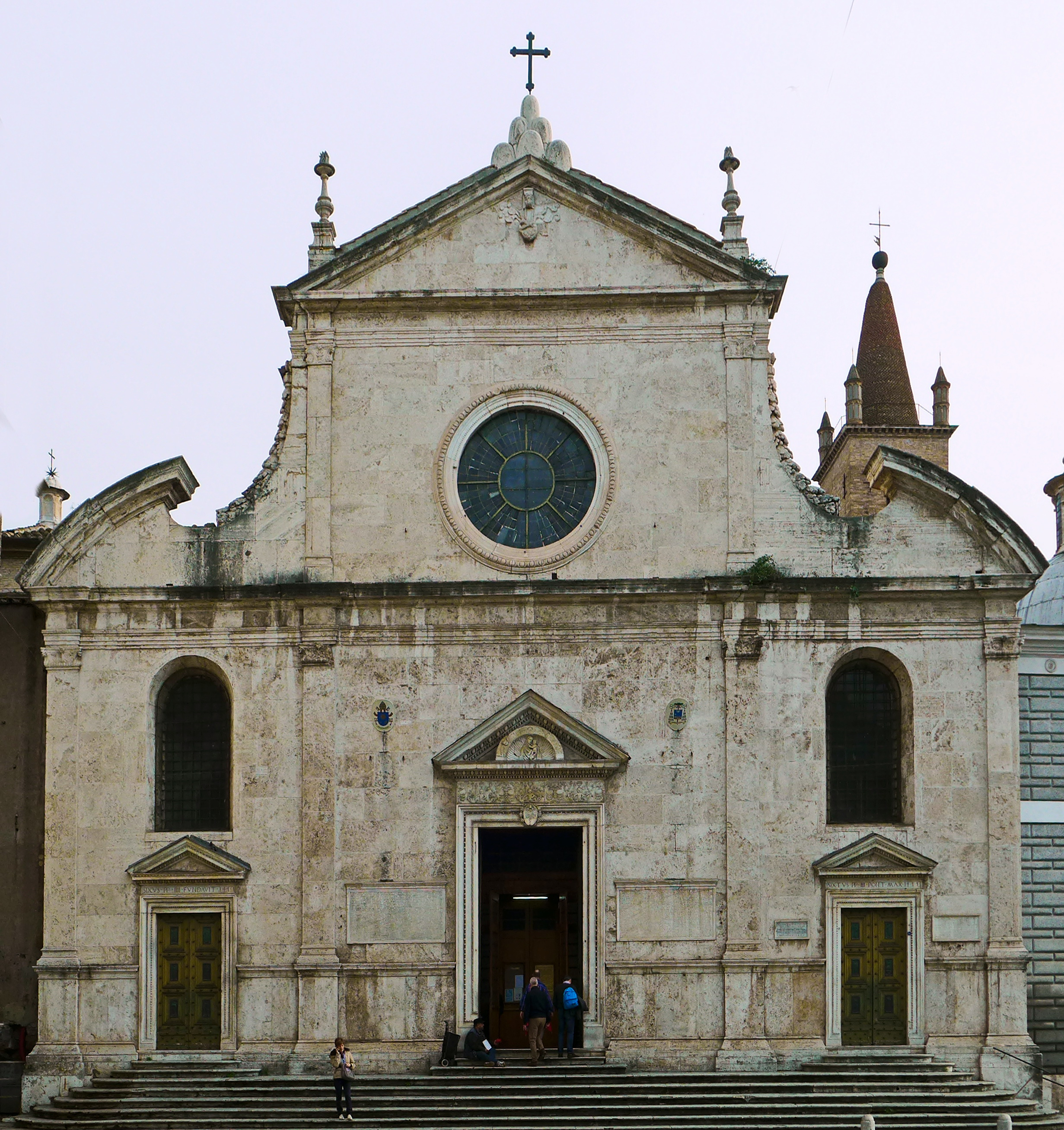
The façade of the basilica

The façade was built in early Renaissance style in the 1470s when the medieval church was rebuilt by Pope Sixtus IV. It was later reworked by Gian Lorenzo Bernini in the 17th century but pictorial sources preserved its original form, for example a woodcut in Girolamo Franzini's guide in 1588, and a veduta by Giovanni Maggi in 1625. Originally there were tracery panels in the windows and spokes in the central rose window, and the building was free-standing with a clear view of the bell tower and the row of identical side chapels on the right.

The architecture is often attributed to Andrea Bregno but without definitive evidence. According to Ulrich Fürst the architect aimed at perfect proportioning and also at masterful restraint in the detail. "In this way he succeeded in designing the best church façade in early-Renaissance Rome."

The two-storey high façade was built of bright Roman travertine. The three entrances are accessed by a flight of stairs lending the basilica a feel of monumentality. The architecture is simple and dignified with four shallow pilasters on the lower level and two pilasters flanking the upper part with the rose window in the center. The pilasters have Corinthianesque capitals with egg-and-dart moulding and vegetal decoration on the lower level while those on the upper level feature simpler capitals with acanthus leaves, scrolls and palmettes. The side doors are surmounted by triangular pediments and their lintels have dedicatory inscriptions referring to Pope Sixtus IV. There is a pair of large arched windows above them.

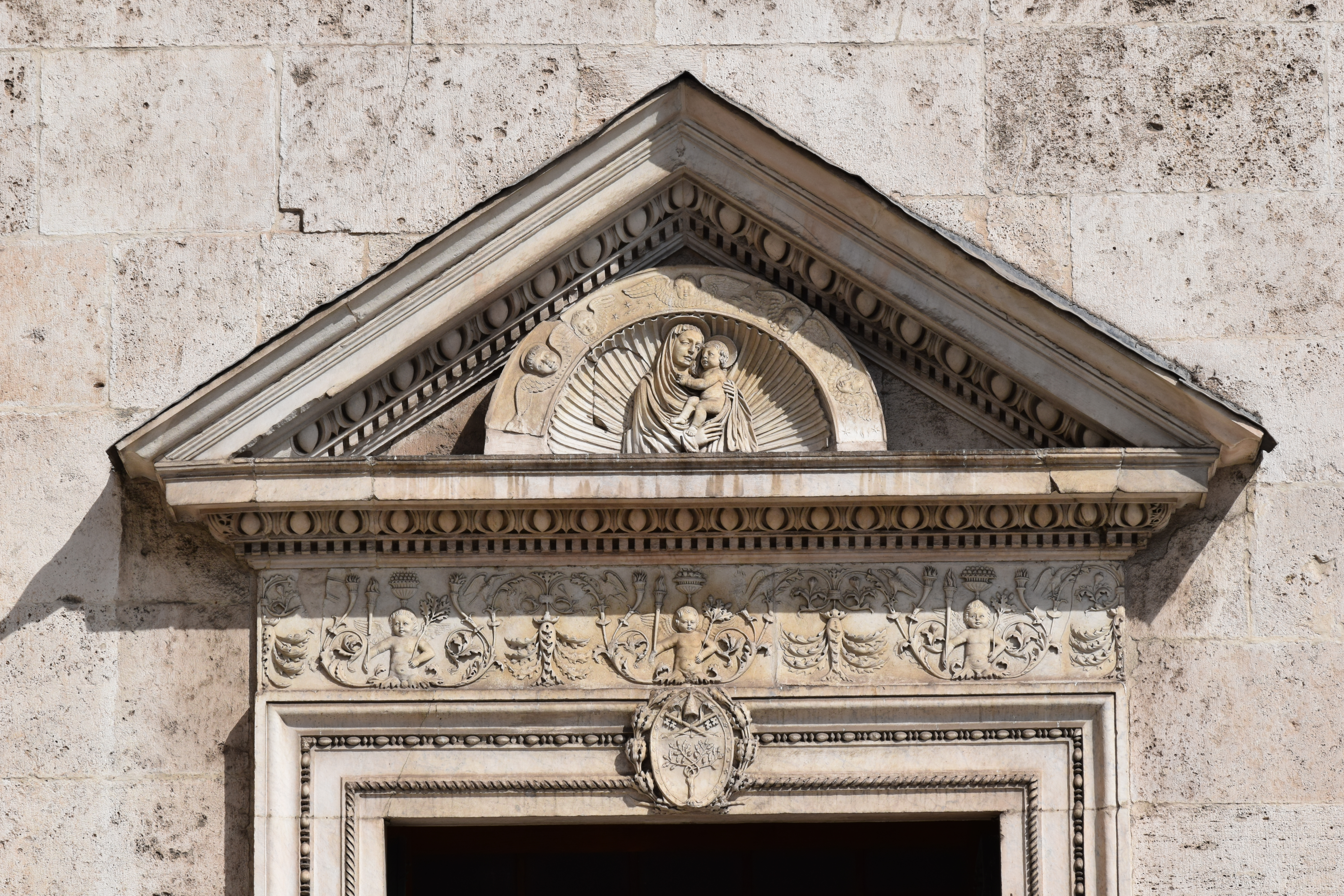
The pediment and the frieze of the central doorway

The main door is more monumental that the others. Its pointed pediment is filled with a sculpture of the Madonna and the Child set in a scallop shell. The rim of the niche is decorated with cherubs among six-pointed stars and whiffs of clouds. The frieze has a fine carved decoration of artificial foliage, pecking birds and three putti who are holding torches and oak branches in their hands and carrying bowls of fruit on their heads. The coat-of-arms of Pope Sixtus IV on the lintel is encircled by oak branches. The carvings around the door are the only significant sculptural decorations on the façade and as a whole they summarize the iconographic program of the Sistine rebuilding. The central motif is the Madonna del Popolo surrounded by the symbols of heavenly light and paradisiacal abundance, intertwined with the emblem of the Della Rovere dynasty, and set in a perfectly classical frame.

Bernini added the two halves of a broken segmental pediment on the sides of the upper level, replacing the original volutes, and the curved connecting element with the rich oak garlands. Further Baroque additions were the two flaming torches and the six mountains, the family symbols of the Chigi dynasty. The plain pediment was originally decorated with the coat of arms of Pope Sixtus IV hanging on an acanthus leaf scroll corbel but only the truncated upper part of the shield survived.

=== Inscriptions ===
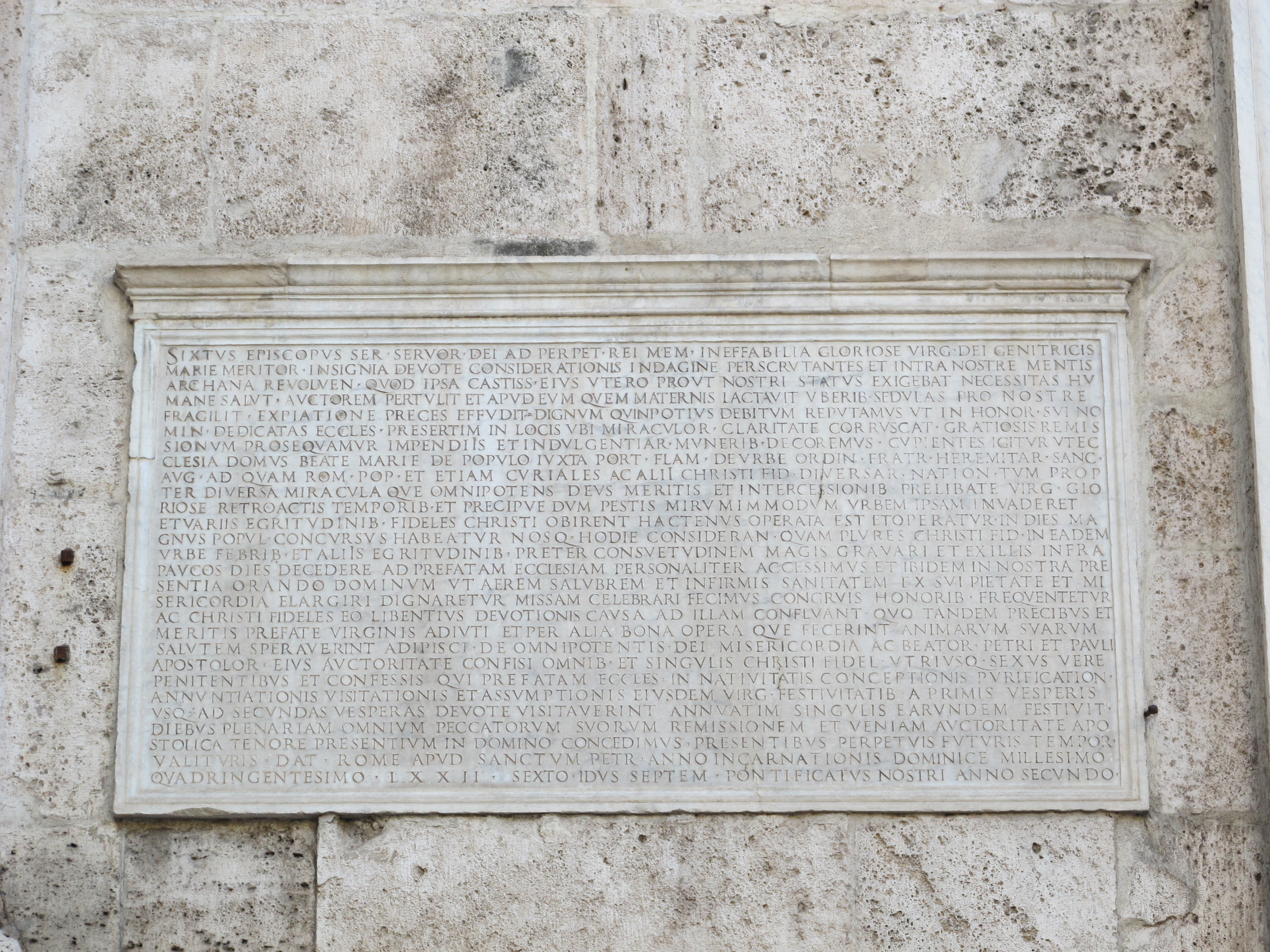
Inscription on the facade, one of the papal bulls

There are two lengthy inscriptions on the two sides of the main entrance quoting the bulls of Pope Sixtus IV in regard to the church. With the first one, dated on 7 September 1472, which begins with the words Ineffabilia Gloriosae Virginis Dei Genitricis, he granted plenary indulgence and remission of all sins to the faithful of both sexes who, truly repented and confessed, attend this church on the days of the Immaculate Conception, Nativity, Annunciation, Visitation, Purification, and Assumption of the Blessed Virgin Mary.

The second one, dated on 12 October 1472, begins with the words A Sede Apostolica sunt illa benigno favore concedenda, in which he confirmed the perpetual plenary indulgence that can be earned on the earlier indicated feastdays of the Virgin, and more, commemorating the indulgences granted to the church by the former popes.

The inscriptions are famous examples of the so-called 'Sistine' style of all'antica capital lettering, a revived form of ancient Roman monumental inscriptional writing adapted to create a uniquely Renaissance idiom. The main source of this style was Bregno himself who used it on the inscriptions on his funeral monuments.

On both side of the right door there are smaller plaques commemorating the indulgences that Gregory XIII conceded to the basilica in 1582 and the fact that Sixtus V included Santa Maria del Popolo among the seven pilgrimage churches of Rome in 1586.

=== The dome ===
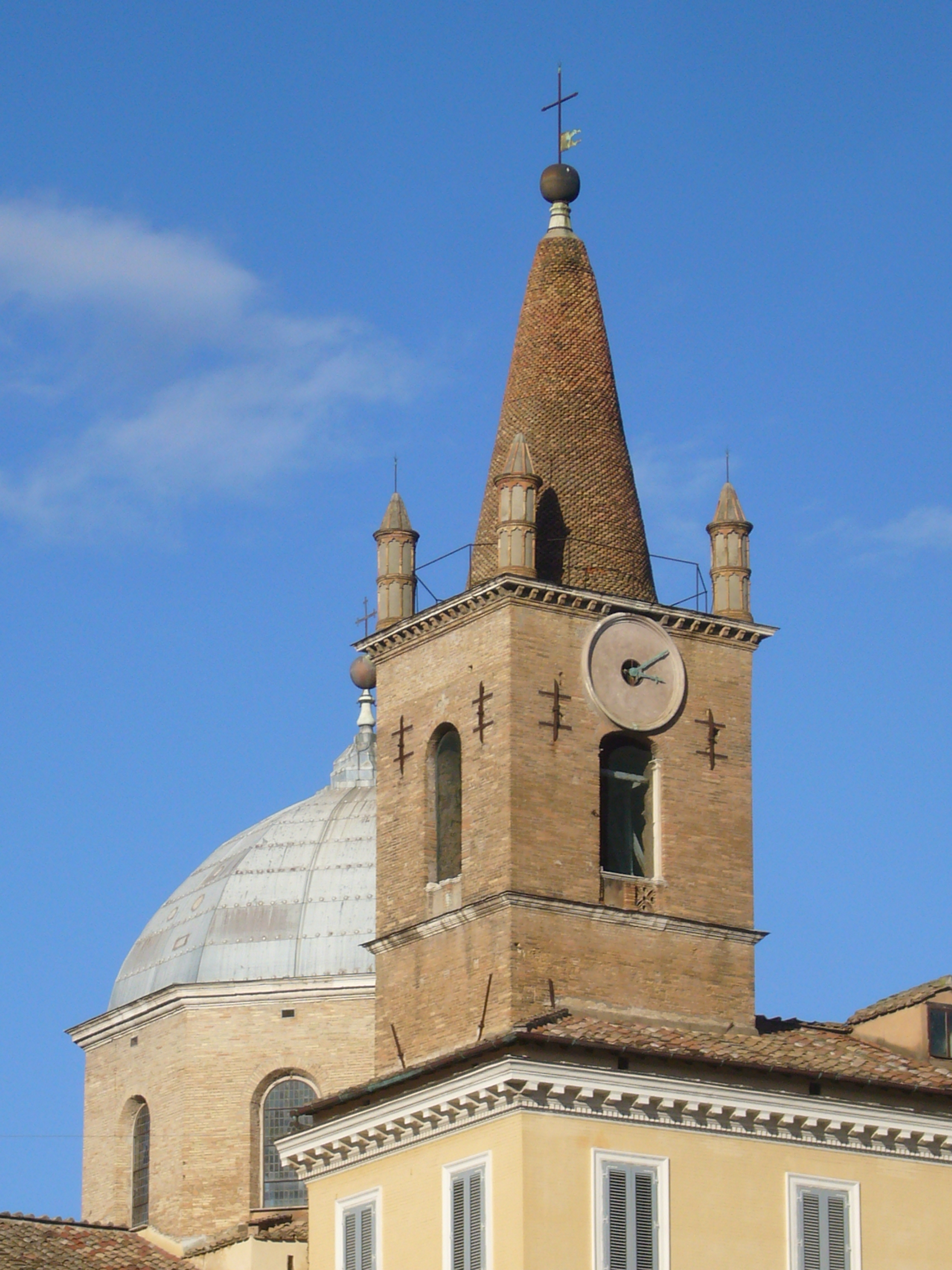
The northern style bell tower and the octagonal dome

The dome of Santa Maria del Popolo was the first octagonal Renaissance dome above a rectangular crossing erected on a high tambour. At the time of its building in 1474-75 it had no real precedent, the only comparable examples are the drawings of Filarete for the utopist city of Sforzinda which have never been carried out. As such the dome was a visual anomaly in the skyline of Rome but later became a prototype that has many followers in the city and in other Italian towns. The raison d'être of this novelty was the miraculous icon of Madonna del Popolo that was placed right in the center of the domed sanctuary.

The dome itself is a rather irregular mixed masonry construction of tuff blocks, bricks and mortar, covered with lead sheets. There is a thin inner shell made of bricks which can be a later addition to create a suitable surface for the frescoes. The dome is capped with an elegant globe and cross finial. The high brick tambour is punctuated with eight arched windows which originally had stone mullions like all the other openings of the church. The whole structure rests on a low square base.

=== Bell tower ===
The 15th-century bell tower is placed at the end of the right transept. The structure was later incorporated into the Neo-Classical monastery that covered the larger part of its body. The tall brick tower was built in Northern Italian style which was unusual at the time in Rome but probably suited the taste of the Lombard congregation. The conical spire, which was built of petal shaped clay bricks, is surrounded with four cylindrical pinnacles with conical caps. These pinnacles have two superimposed rows of blind arcades with cusped brick arches. The spire is crowned with a ball and cross finial with an added weather vane. The top part of the tower shows a strong similarity to the bell tower of the Basilica of San Zeno in Verona. The rectangular tower is articulated by stone cornices. On the top floor it has large arched windows on every side. Only damaged traces of the original stone mullions and ornamental brickwork parapets survived in the openings except on the eastern side where the mullion remained intact. This is a typical biforate window with small Tuscan pillars and a quatrefoil.

The circular clock on the southern side is a later addition. The clock is visibly oversized for the space between the window and the cornice; in the 18th century it was installed lower down on the same side of the tower. Another row of arched windows on this level was already walled up in the second half of the 17th century.

=== Doors ===
The three studded wooden doors are decorated with bronze reliefs by a Calabrian sculptor, Michele Guerrisi from 1963. On the panels of the main door there are scenes from the Passion of Jesus while the reliefs of the side doors illustrate chosen Biblical phrases.

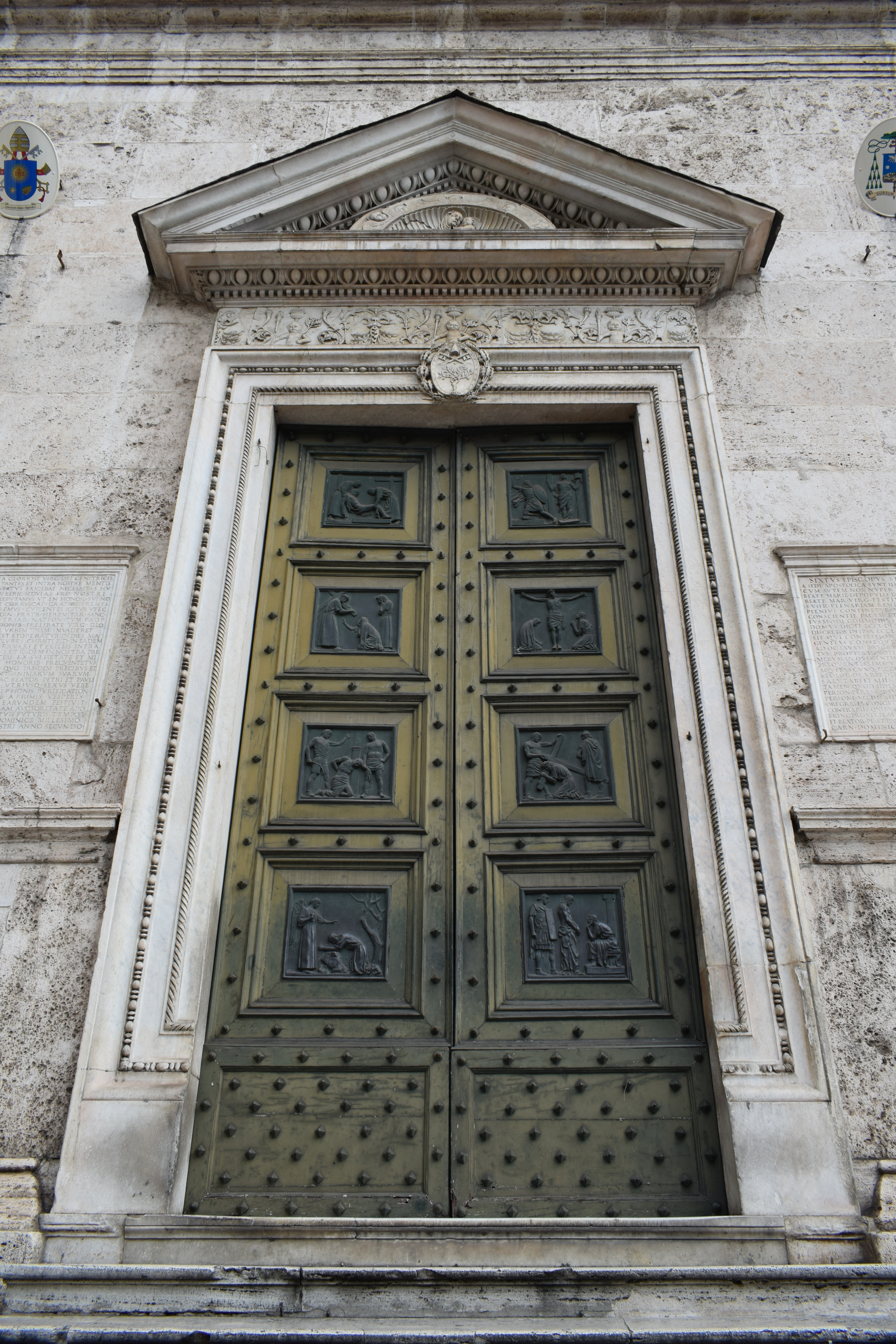
The main door

Left door panels

upper row: (1) Angel with a book - Timor Domini initium sapientiae (The fear of the Lord is the beginning of wisdom, Psalm 111:10); (2) Angel with a chalice and grape - Hic est enim sanguis meus (This is my blood, Matthew 26:28)

middle row: (1) Angel with a censer - Ascendit oratio sicut incensum (The prayer ascends like incense, a version of Psalm 141:2); (2) Angel with a candlestick and oil lamp - Ad revelationem gentium (For revelation to the Gentiles, Luke 2:32)

lower row: (1) Angel with a tiara and crosier - Ecclesia mater et magistra (The Church, mother and teacher, especially in the documents of the Second Vatican Council); (2) Angel with aspergillum, aspersorium and ear of wheat - Asperge me Domine et mundabor (Purify me, Lord, and I will be clean, Psalm 51:9)

=== Main door panels ===
1st row: (1) Descent from the Cross; (2) Resurrection

2nd row: (1) Jesus meets his mother, Mary; (2) Jesus on the cross with Mary and John

3rd row: (1) Flagellation of Christ; (2) Simon helps carry the cross

4th row: (2) Agony in the Garden; (2) Jesus before Pilate

=== Right door panels ===
upper row: (1) Angel with scroll and sources of water - Euntes ergo docete omnes gentes (Therefore, go and make disciples of all nations, Matthew 28:19); (2) Angel with trumpet - Et vos estote parati (You also must be ready, Luke 12:40)

middle row: (1) Angel with chalice, cross and crown of thorns - Non sicut ego volo sed sicut tu (Not as I will, but as you will, Matthew 26:39); (2) Angel sitting on a stone with wand - Resurrexit non est hic (He has risen, he is not here, Matthew 28:6)

lower row: (1) Angel with the Tablets of Stone - Ego sum Dominus Deus tuus (I am the Lord Your God, Exodus 20:2); (2) Angel with dove and snake - Ave Maria gratia plena (Hail Mary, full of grace, first words of the Hail Mary)

== Interior ==
=== Counterfaçade ===
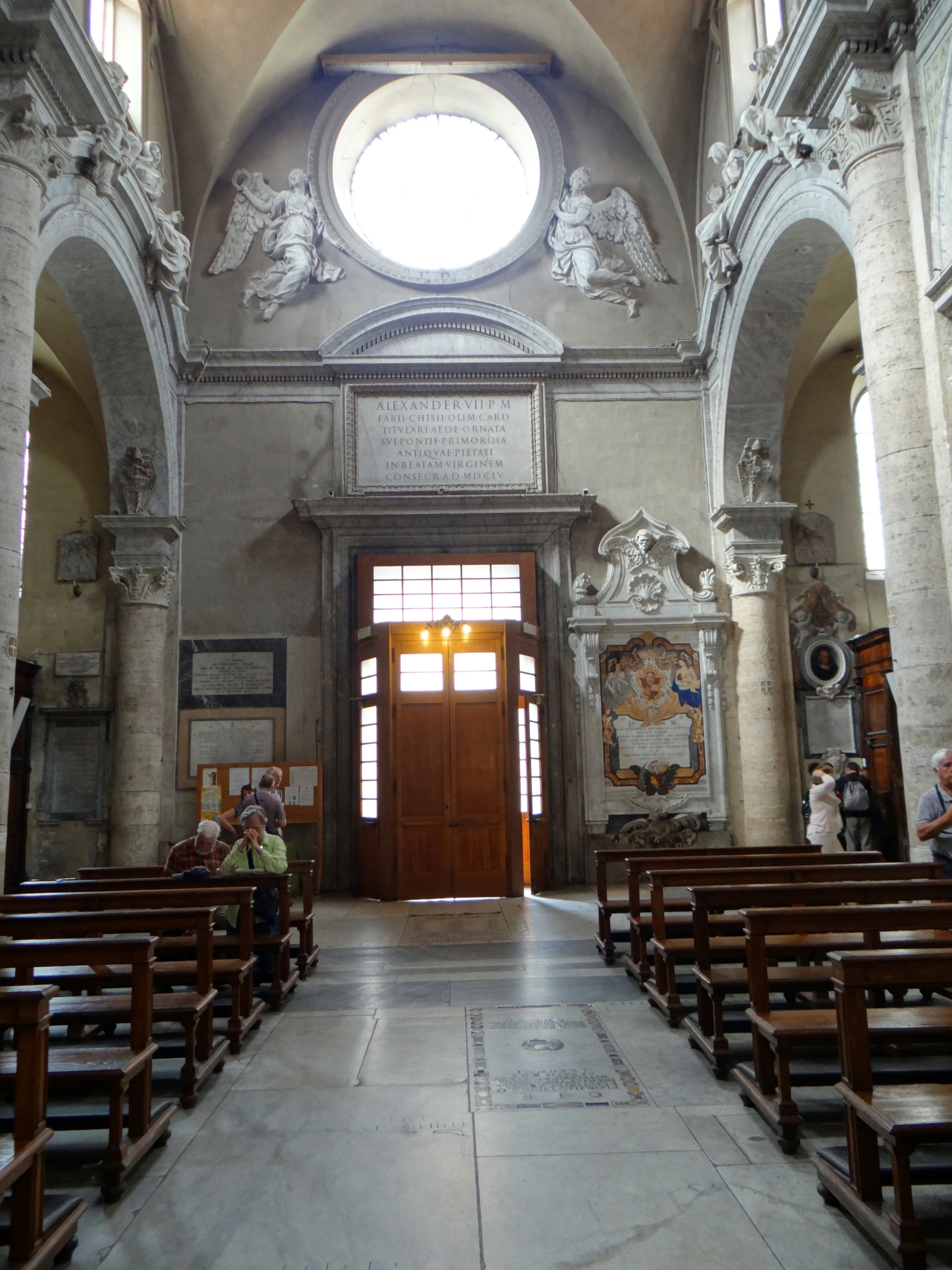
The counterfaçade with the dedicatory inscription of Alexander VII

The decoration of the counterfaçade was part of the Berninian reconstruction of the church in the 17th century. The architecture is simple with a marble frame around the monumental door, a dentilled cornice, a segmental arched pediment and a dedicatory inscription commemorating the thorough rebuilding of the ancient church that Pope Alexander VII initiated as Fabio Chigi, Cardinal Priest of the basilica, and its consecration in 1655 as newly elected Pope:

ALEXANDER · VII · P · M / FABII · CHISII · OLIM · CARD / TITULARI · AEDE · ORNATA / SUI · PONTIF · PRIMORDIA / ANTIQAE · PIETATI / IN · BEATAM · VIRGINEM / CONSECR ·A · D · MDCLV.

The rose window is supported by two stucco angels sculpted by Ercole Ferrata in 1655-58 under the guidance of Bernini. The one on the left holds a wreath in her hand. On the lower part of the counterfaçade there are various funeral monuments.

=== Nave ===
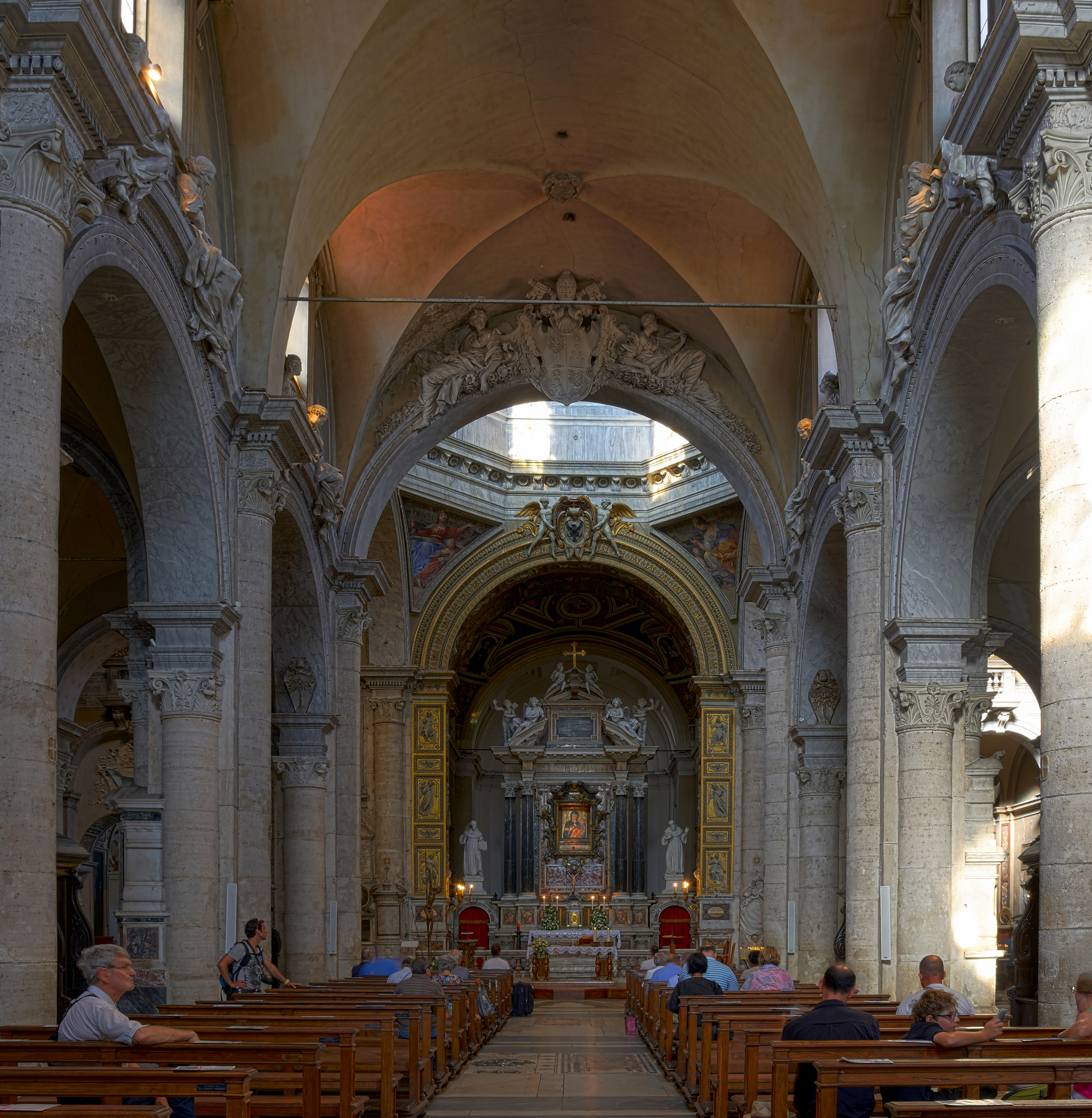
The interior of the basilica

The church of Santa Maria del Popolo is a Renaissance basilica with a nave and two aisles, and a transept with a central dome. The nave and the aisles have four bays, and they are covered with cross-vaults. There are four piers on each side that support the arches separating the nave from the aisles. Each pillar has four travertine semi-columns, three of them supporting the arches and the vault of the aisles while the taller fourth supports the nave vaults. The semi-columns have Corintianesque capitals with a palmette ornament between the scrolls. There are subtle differences between the capitals in the type of the palmette and the fleuron. Unlike the column shafts, the capitals are still coated with plaster.

The original 15th-century architecture was largely preserved by Bernini who only added a strong stone cornice and embellished the arches with pairs of white stucco statues portraying female saints. The first two pairs on the left and the right are medieval monastic founders and reformers, the rest are all early Christian saints and martyrs. Their names are written on the spandrels of the arches with gilt letters. The cross-vaults remained undecorated and simply whitewashed. The keystones in the nave and the transept are decorated with coats of arms of Pope Sixtus IV. The Della Rovere papal escutcheons were also placed on the cornice of the intrados in the first and the last arches of the nave. These stone carvings are gilt and painted. The nave is lit by two rows of large segmental arched clerestory windows with a simple Baroque stone molding and bracketed cornice. Before the Berninian rebuilding the clerestory windows were the same mullioned arched openings like those on the facade and the bell tower.

The nave ends with a triumphal arch that is decorated with a sumptuous stucco group which was created during the Berninian reconstruction. The papal coat of arms of Alexander VII is seen in the middle flanked by two angel-like Victories holding palm branches who repose on rich garlands of flowers. This group is the work of Antonio Raggi. It should be noted the nave and the transept had a more unified Baroque appearance before the purist restoration of Antonio Muñoz in 1912. He removed the thick plaster coat from the shafts of the travertine half-columns that was painted to create an appearance of cipollino marble. Another lost Baroque feature was created by Giovanni Maria Mariani whose name was mentioned regularly in the payments between 1657 and 1658. It is not possible to reconstruct his work in the basilica but he was a specialist of sumptuous ornamental friezes with great figures, festoons and grisailles. Presumably he was tasked with the seamless integration of the real and painted sculpture in the nave and the transept.

=== Pairs of saints in the nave ===
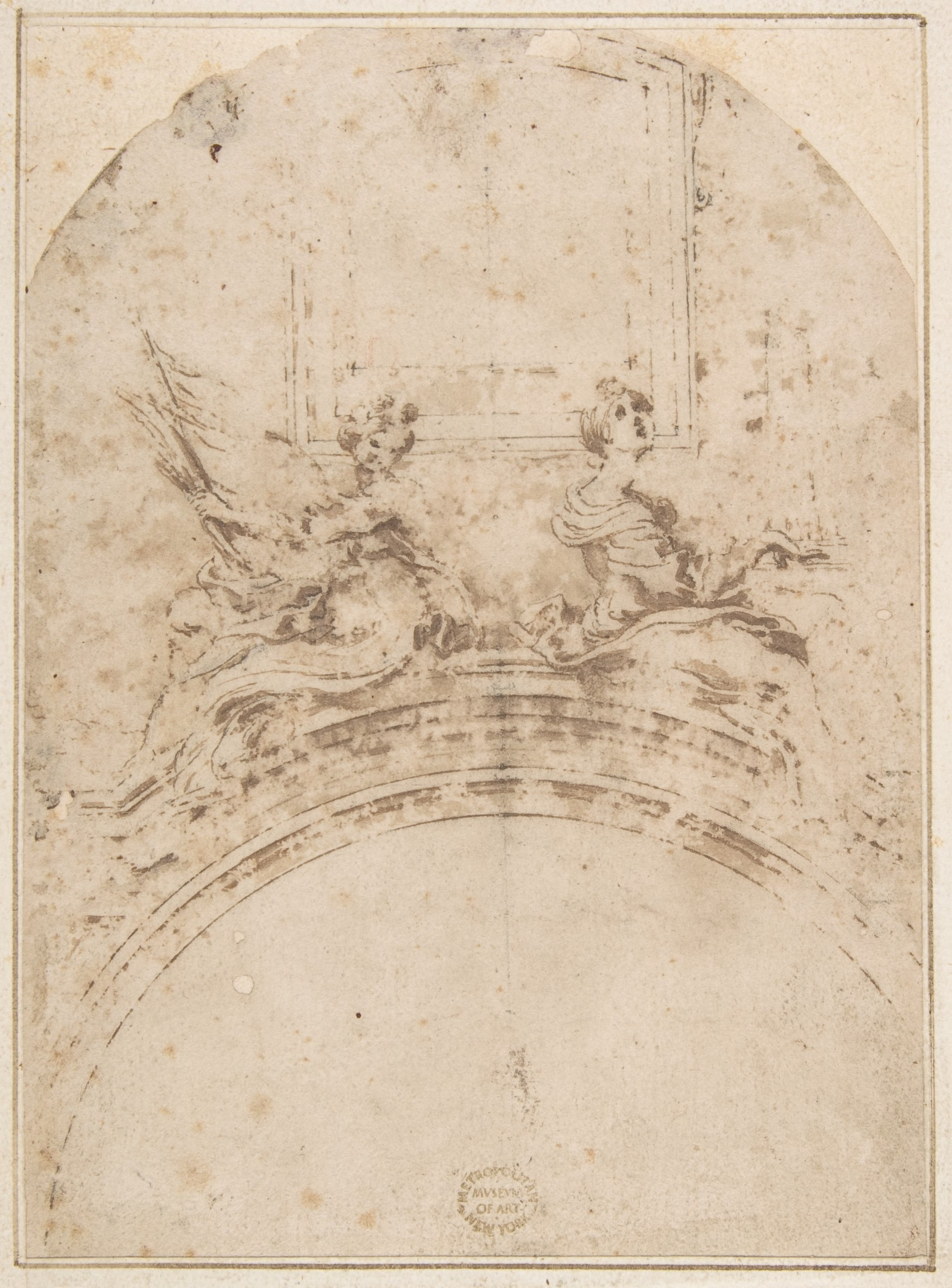
The figures of Saint Ursula and Cecilia, sketch from Bernini's workshop in the Metropolitan Museum of Art

Originally Bernini planned to fill the spaces between the windows and the arches with statues of kneeling angels. These figures appear in several drawings of a sketchbook from his workshop but by 1655 Bernini changed his mind and placed statues of female saints on the cornices. These saintly virgins are leading the eye toward the image of the Virgin on the main altar. The statues were probably designed by Bernini himself, and a supposedly autograph drawing for the figure of Saint Ursula survived in the collection of the Museum der bildenden Künste in Leipzig, but his plans were executed by the sculptors of his workshop between August and December 1655. Their different styles could be felt within the unified scheme.

Left side:

1st arch

- Saint Clare with a monstrance
- Saint Scholastica with a book and a dove

Nuns and founders of great female monastic orders - Sculptor: Ercole Ferrata

2nd arch

- Saint Catherine with a palm branch, crown and the shattered torture machine
- Saint Barbara with a palm branch and a tower

Early Christian martyrs in the age of persecution - Sculptor: Antonio Raggi

3rd arch

- Saint Dorothy with a cherub holding a basket of garden fruits
- Saint Agatha with a cherub and a palm branch

Early Christian virgins and martyrs - Sculptor: Giuseppe Perone

4th arch

- Saint Thecla with a lion
- Saint Apollonia with a bear (?)

Early Christian martyrs who suffered to keep their virginity - Sculptor: Antonio Raggi

Pairs of female saints - left side

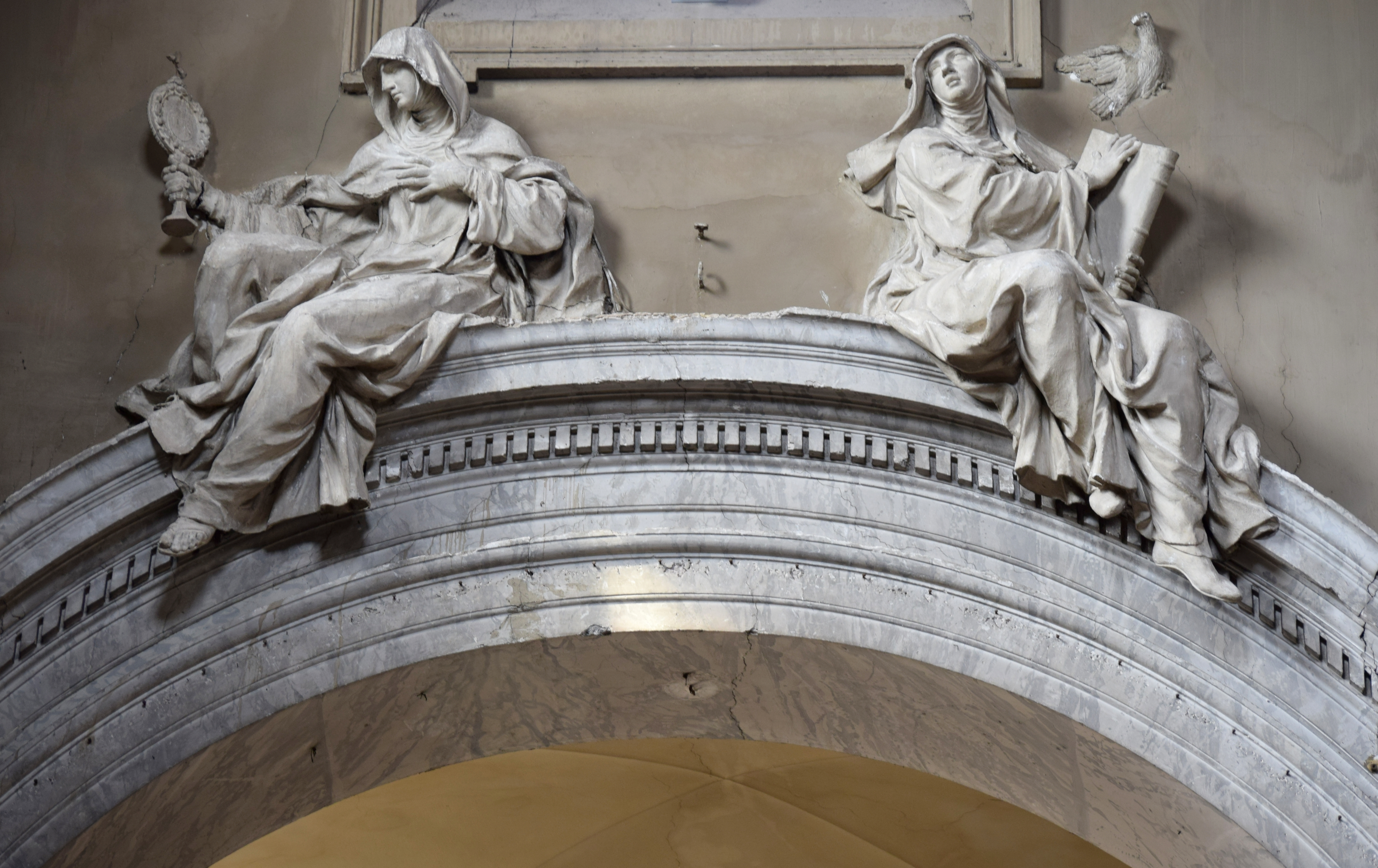

Saints Clare and Scholastica

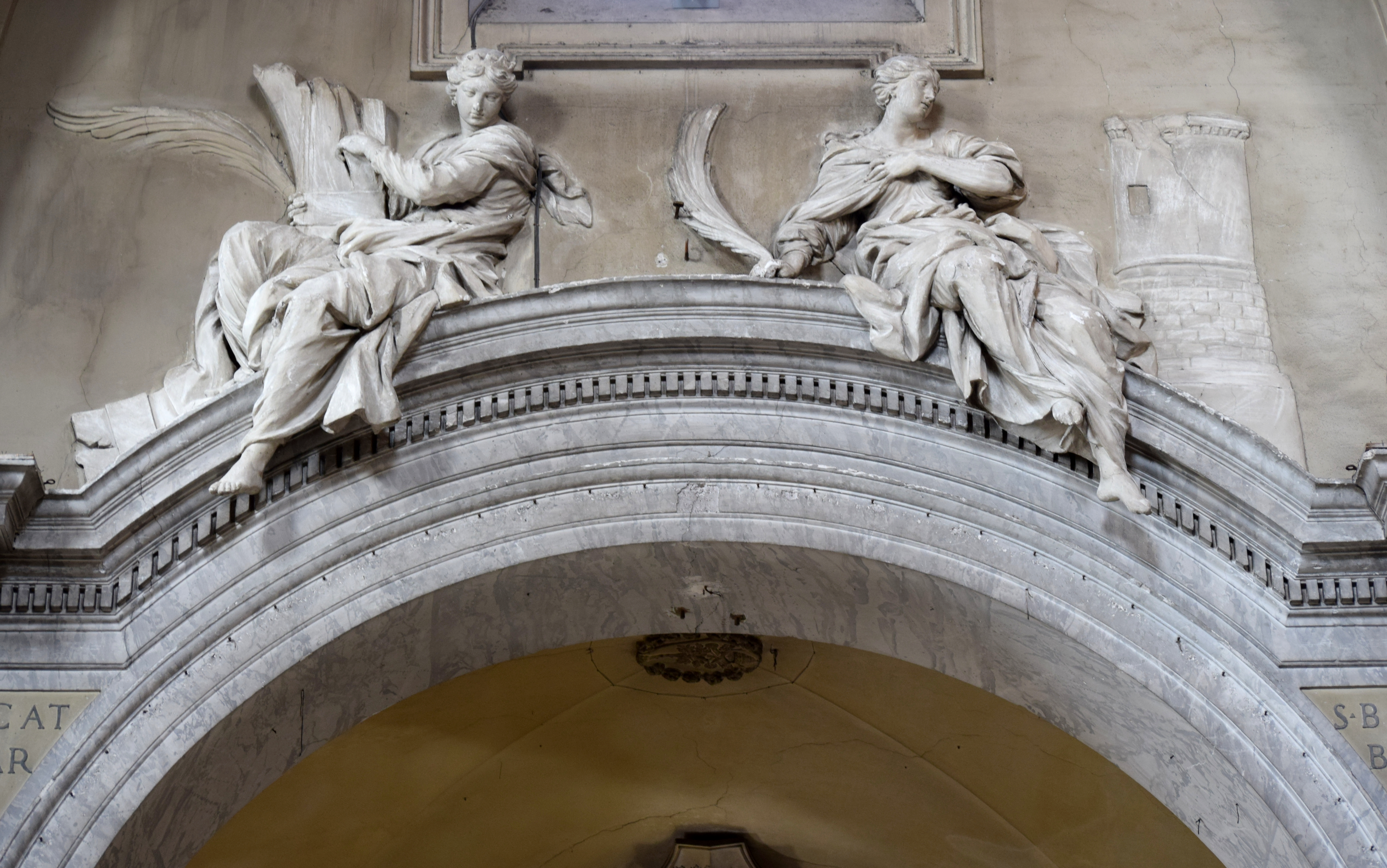

Saints Catherine and Barbara

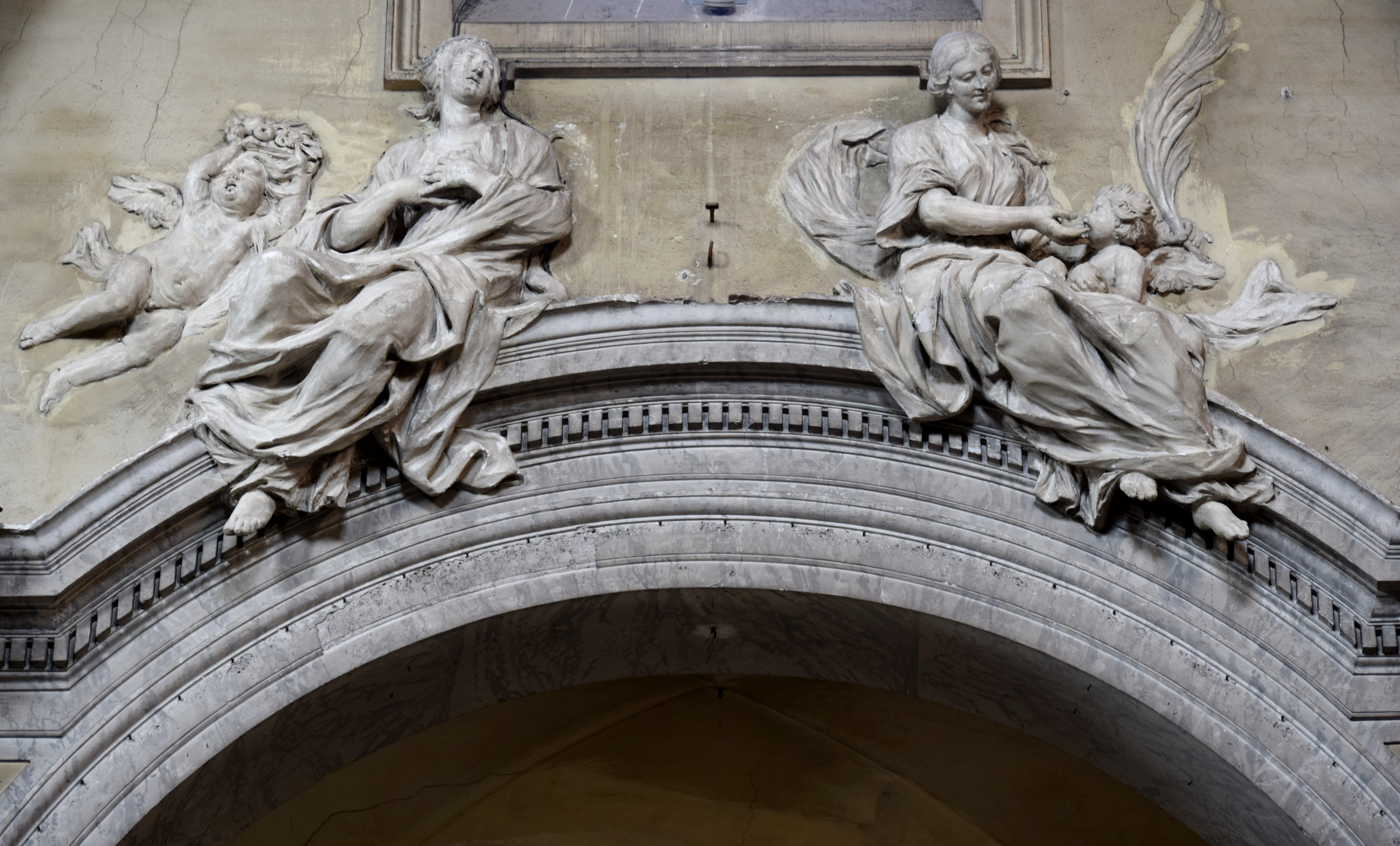

Saints Dorothy and Agatha

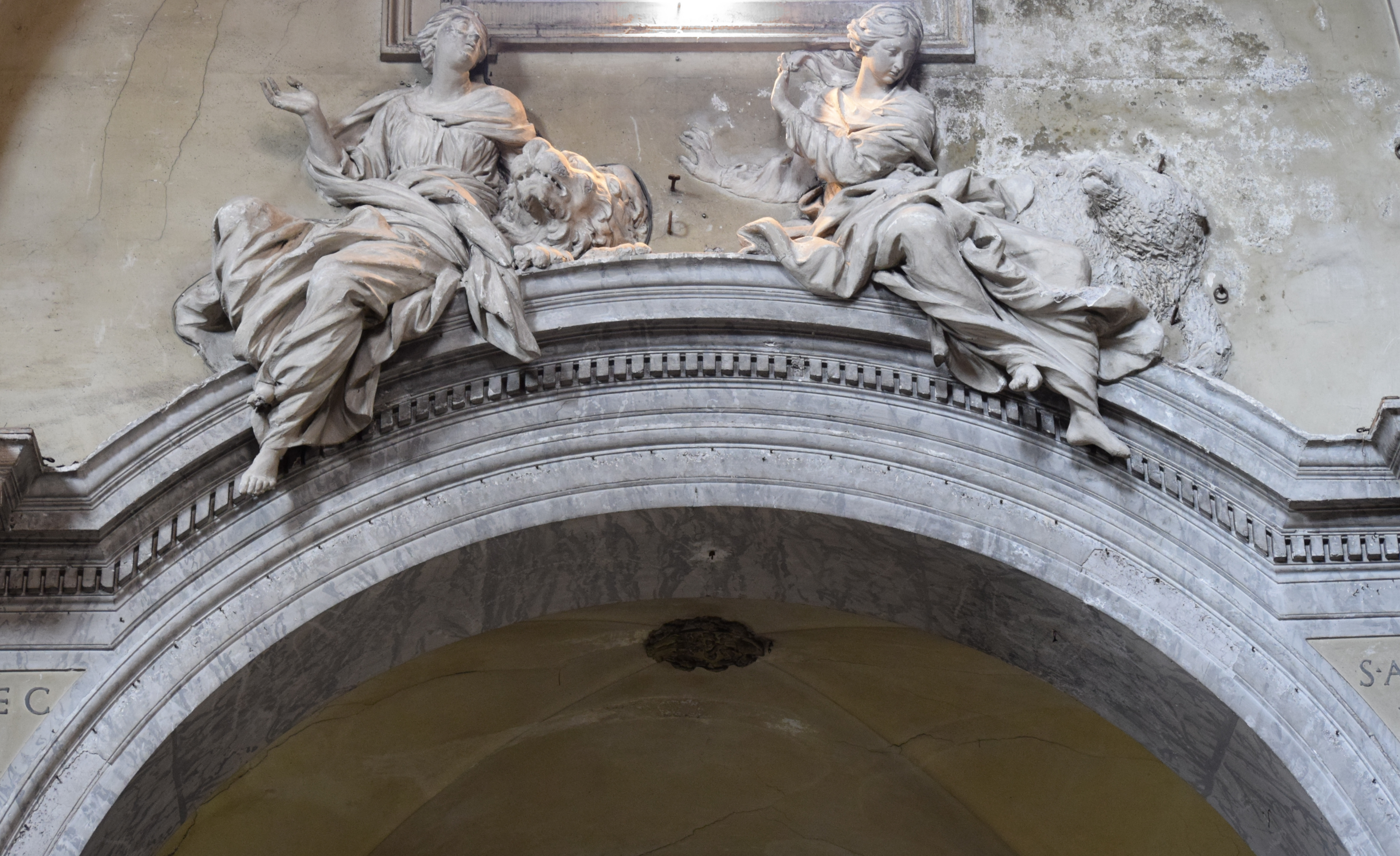

Saints Tecla and Apollonia

Right side:

1st arch

- Saint Catherine of Siena with a crucifix
- Saint Teresa of Ávila with her heart pierced

Nuns and religious reformers - Sculptor: Giovanni Francesco de Rossi

2nd arch

- Saint Praxedes with a sponge and a vessel
- Saint Pudentiana with a cloth and a vessel

Ancient Roman sisters who helped the persecuted Christians - Sculptors: Paolo Naldini and Lazzaro Morelli

3rd arch

- Saint Cecilia with an organ and angel
- Saint Ursula with a banner

Early Christian virgins and martyrs - Sculptor: Giovanni Antonio Mari

4th arch

- Saint Agnes with a lamb and palm branch
- Saint Martina with a lion and palm branch

Early Christian virgins and martyrs - Sculptor: Giovanni Francesco de Rossi

Pairs of female saints - right side

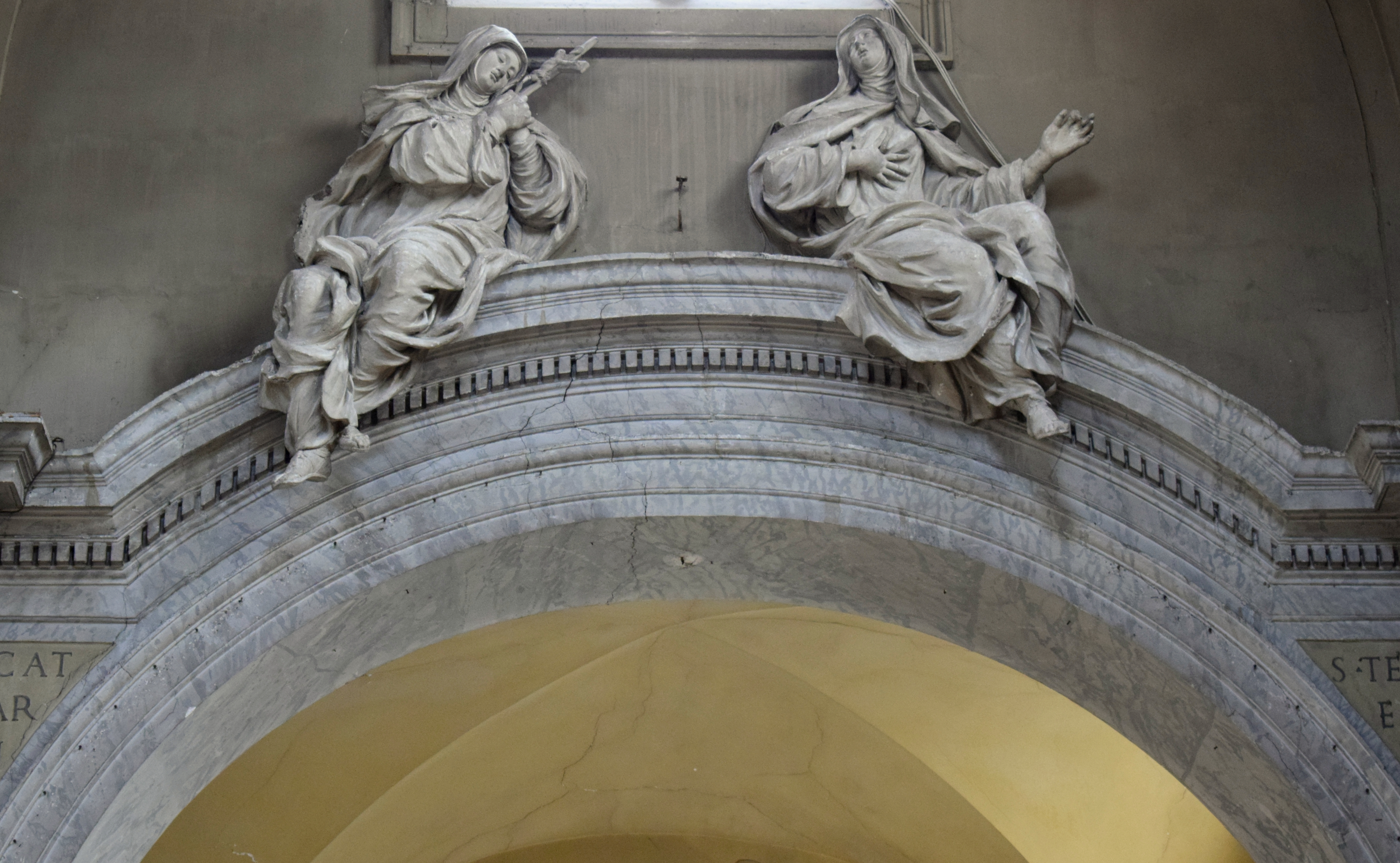

Saints Catherine and Teresa

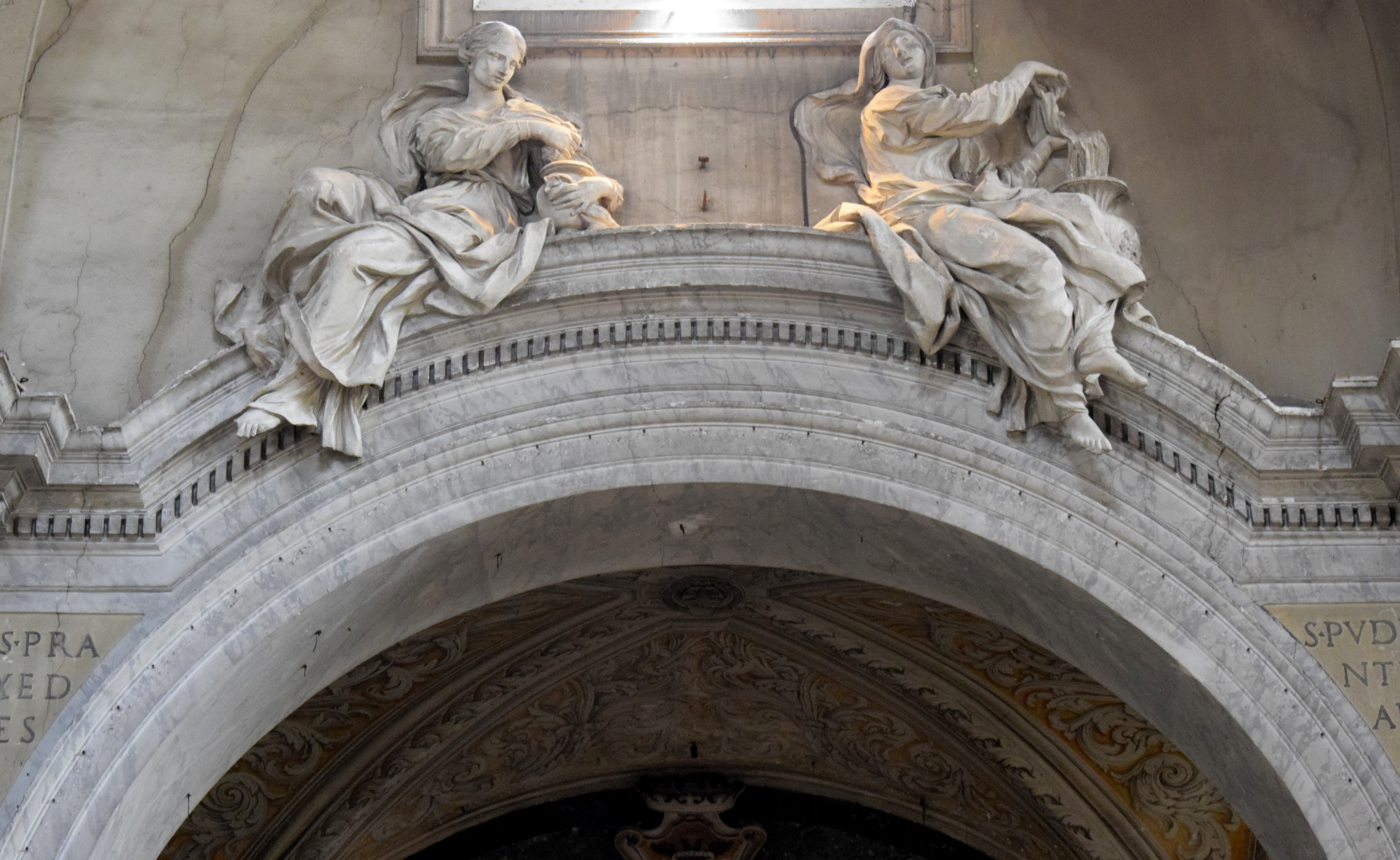

Saints Praxedes and Pudentiana

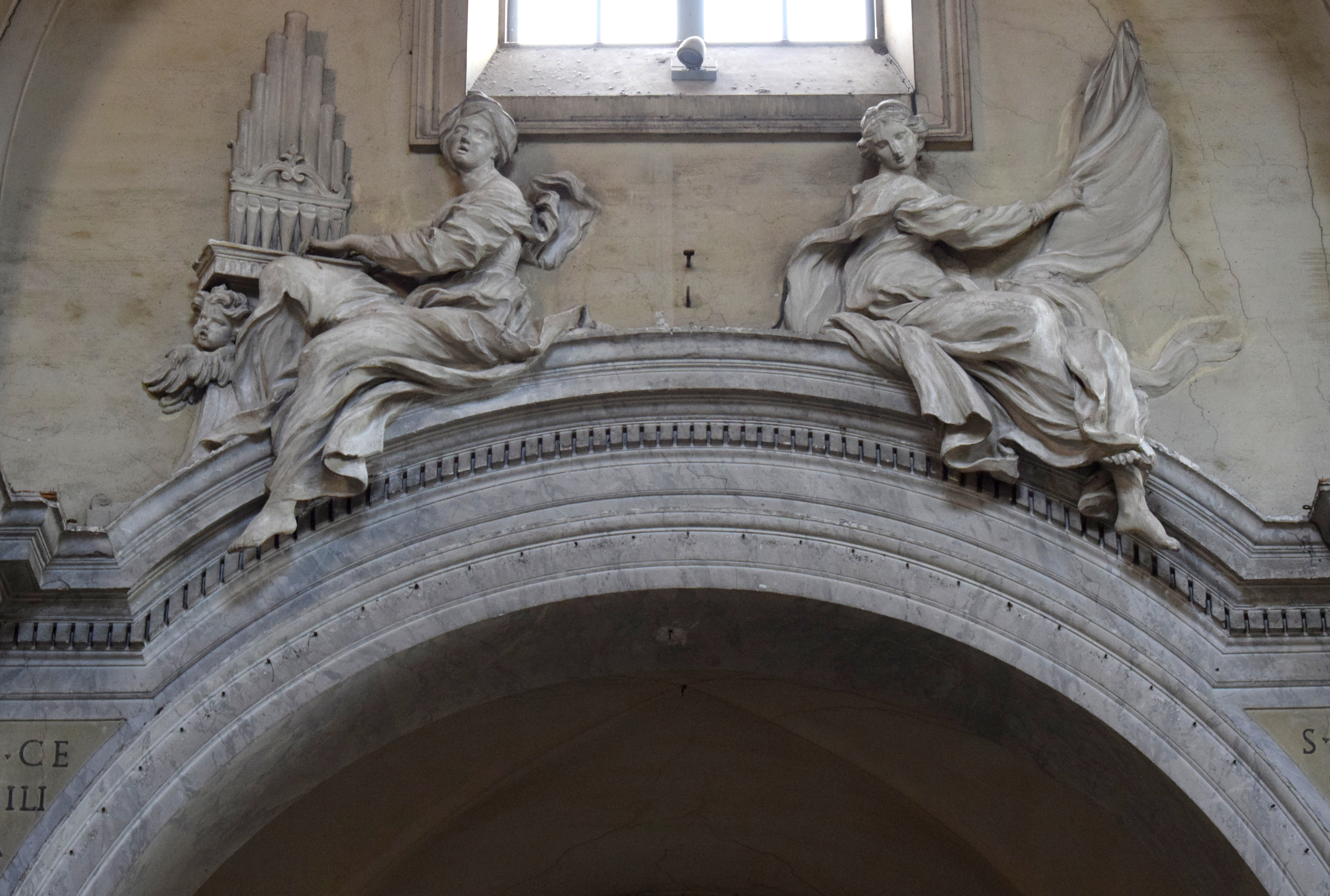

Saints Cecilia and Ursula

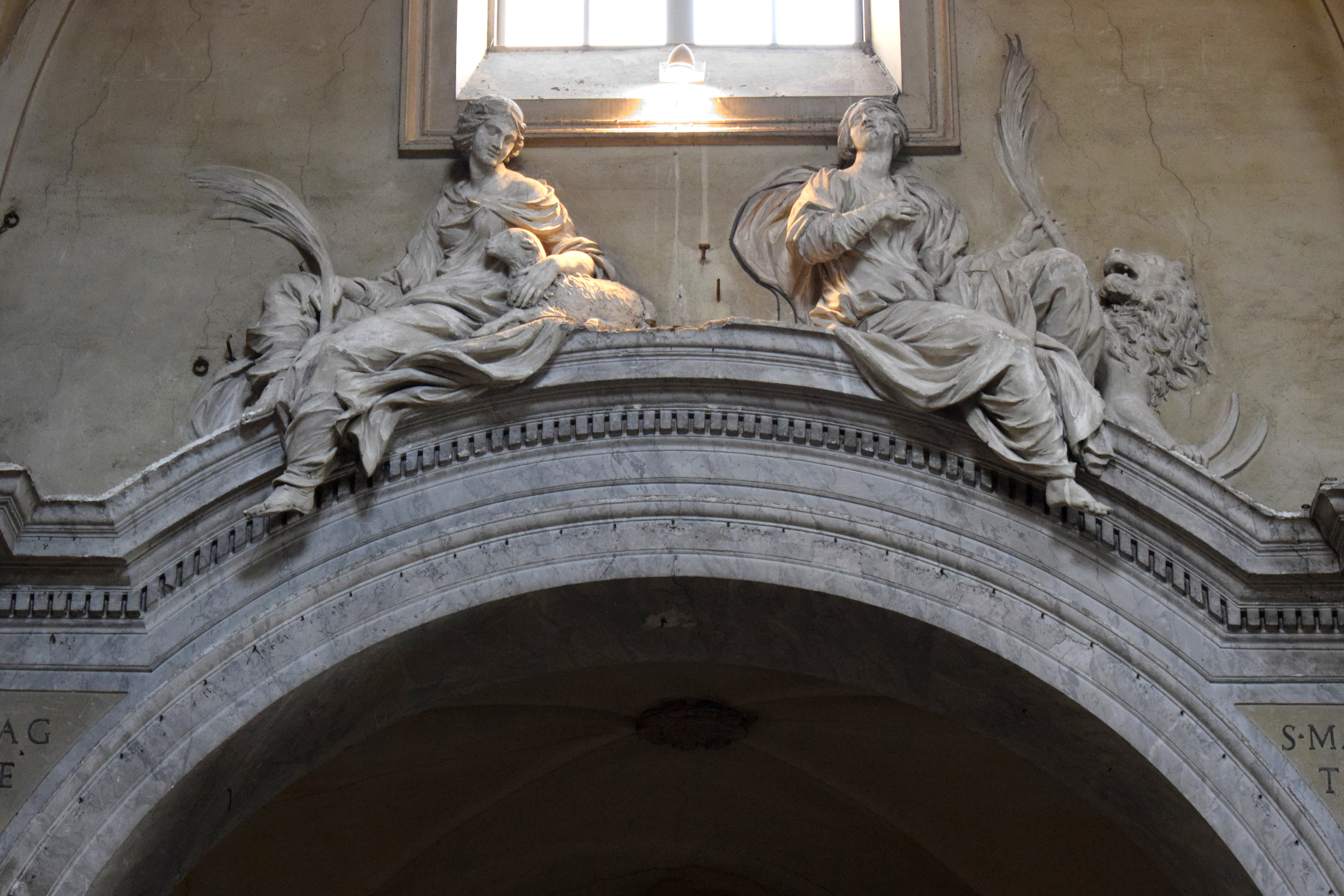

Saints Agnes and Martina

=== Transept ===
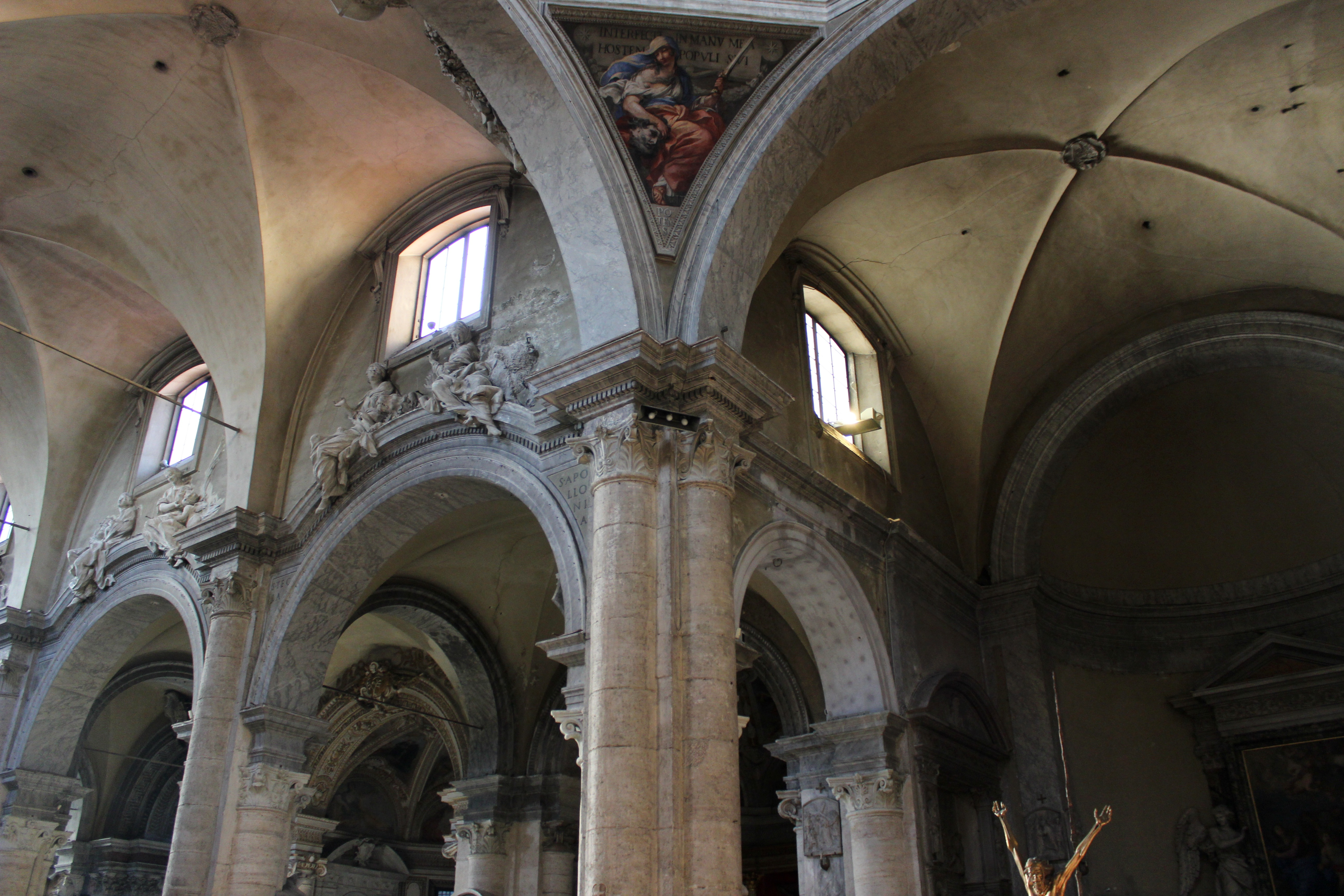
The junction of the nave and the transept

Architecturally the transept is similar to the nave with the same quattrocento cross-vaults and half-columns, Baroque stone revetments, cornices and large segmental arched clerestory windows. The arms are only one bay long, they end with semicircular apses that were rebuilt by Bernini. The two identical side altars and the majestic organ lofts above the entrance arches of the eastern side chapels were created by his workshop. The side altars are edicules made of different coloured marbles, they are embellished with triangular pediments, Corinthian pilasters, Classical friezes with acanthus scrolls and flanking angels. The plinths are decorated with the arms of the Chigi family (the princely version on the right-hand altar and the ecclesiastical version with the cardinal hat on the other) while the frontals are particularly rich pietre dure stoneworks.

The first sketches for the four marble angels supporting the altars were drawn by the young Giovanni Battista Gaulli, and the sheets are still preserved in the collection of the Berlin State Museums. The lively designs were probably toned down before their execution by the sculptors of the workshop. From 1657 to 1658 four sculptors got payments for work on the statues: Antonio Raggi, Ercole Ferrata, Giovanni Antonio Mari and Arrigo Giardè.

In 1660 inscriptions were placed in the new transept chapels above the side doors that named the two nephews of the pope as founders although the rebuilding of the transept was conceived by the Pope Alexander VII himself and the costs were paid directly by the Apostolic Camera. The Altar of the Holy Family belonged to Flavio Chigi, who was Cardinal-Priest of Santa Maria del Popolo at the time and Cardinal-Nephew of the pope. The Altar of the Visitation belonged to Agostino Chigi, the Prince of Farnese. The chalice on the Holy Family painting alludes to priesthood, the vocation of the cardinal, while the theme of the Visitation is strongly connected to fertility, something that was expected of the prince who married Maria Virginia Borghese in 1658, the date on the inscriptions, and founded the Roman branch of the Chigi dynasty.

=== Altar of the Visitation ===
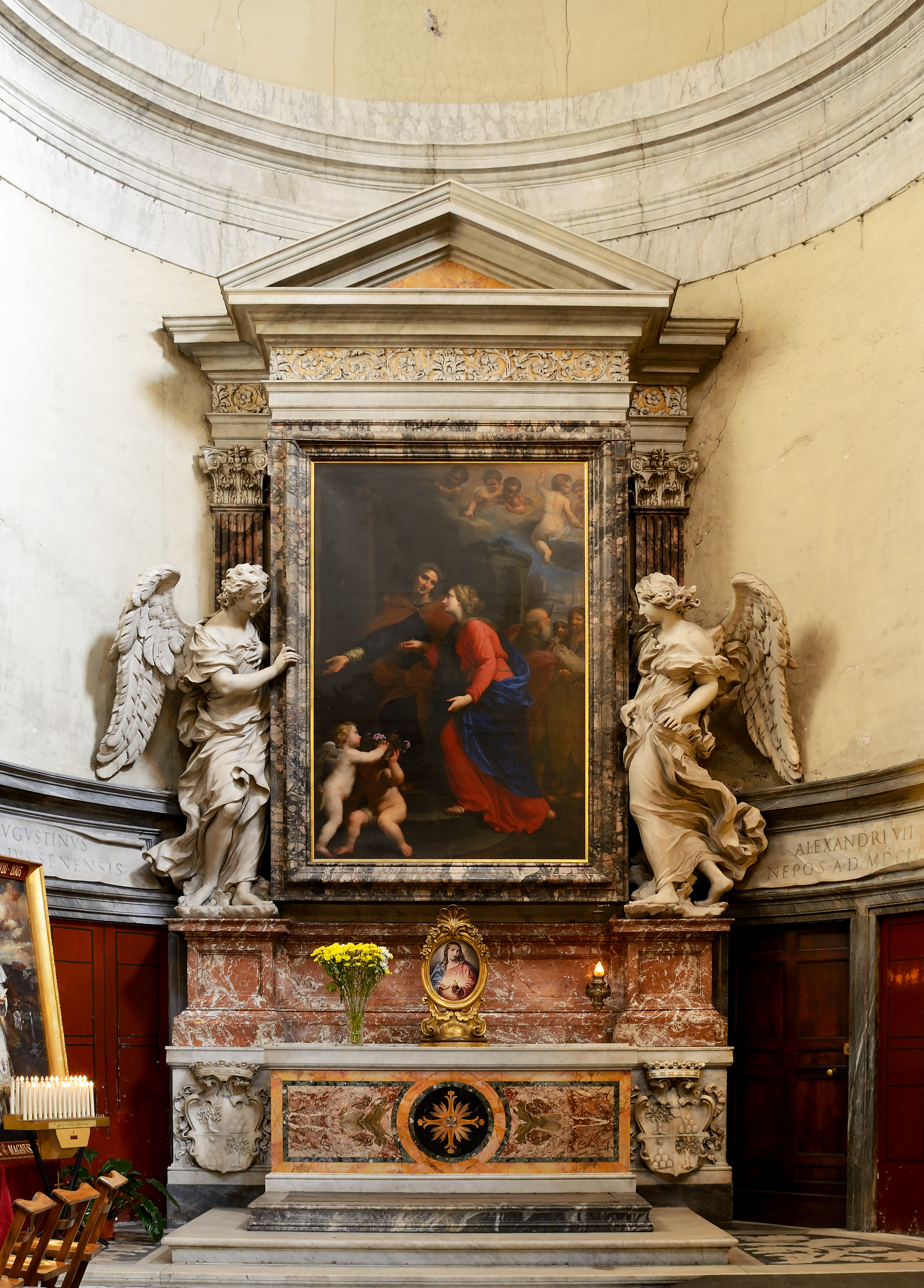
The Altar of the Visitation in the right transept

The altarpiece on right side altar was painted in 1659 by Giovanni Maria Morandi, the favourite portraitist of the Chigi family. The artist got the job thanks to the good offices of his previous patron, Duke Francesco Maria Salviati in 1657. A study for the cherubs holding the wreath of roses in the lower left corner is survived in the Museum der bildenden Künste in Leipzig. On the canvas there are no perceptible signs of the Florentine apprenticeship of the painter, it firmly belongs to the artistic world of the Roman seicento dominated by Carlo Maratta, although Emilian influences could also be noticed.

Curiously Morandi chose not depict the moment of the meeting between Mary and Elizabeth which is the traditional way to visualize the Visitation. The painting shows Elizabeth inviting her younger cousin into their home. On the right Zechariah takes the bag from the hands of Saint Joseph. The composition follows along the lines of the more famous painting of the same subject by Federico Barocci in the Chiesa Nuova (1583–86). Even the colours of the robes of the two women are almost the same. The architectural elements in the painting are characteristically Roman. Instead of a humble house in Judea, the home of Zechariah and Elizabeth is a monumental edifice with circular steps leading to the entrance door. There are identifiable Roman buildings in the background: the round Temple of Vesta in Tivoli, the Castel Sant'Angelo and the Meta Romuli. There are cherubs high up in the sky, and the one without wings on his shoulder looks very similar to the sculpted putto supporting the organ loft in the right transept.

The marble statues of the angels supporting the frame of the altar are attributed to Ercole Ferrata (right) and Arrigo Giardè (left).

_{Santissima Pietà detta Salerna

The chapel in the left transept was called Cappella della Santissima Pietà detta Salerna before the Berninian restructuring. The name referred to the funeral monument of Pietro Guglielmo Rocca, the archbishop of Salerno who died in 1482. His tomb was later relocated to the sacristy. The Pietà in the name referred to the painting on the altar by Jacopino del Conte, the Deposition of Christ into the Sepulchre, which is now kept in the Musée Condé in Chantilly.

The altarpiece was commissioned by the family of Bernardino Elvino, the bishop of Anglona and the treasurer of Pope Paul III in the years after his death in 1548. Giovanni Baglione in his description of the church states that it belonged to the same composition as the funeral monument of the bishop by Guglielmo della Porta. The tomb was eventually relocated to the sacristy corridor while the painting was sold by the Augustinians in 1787.}

=== Altar of the Holy Family ===
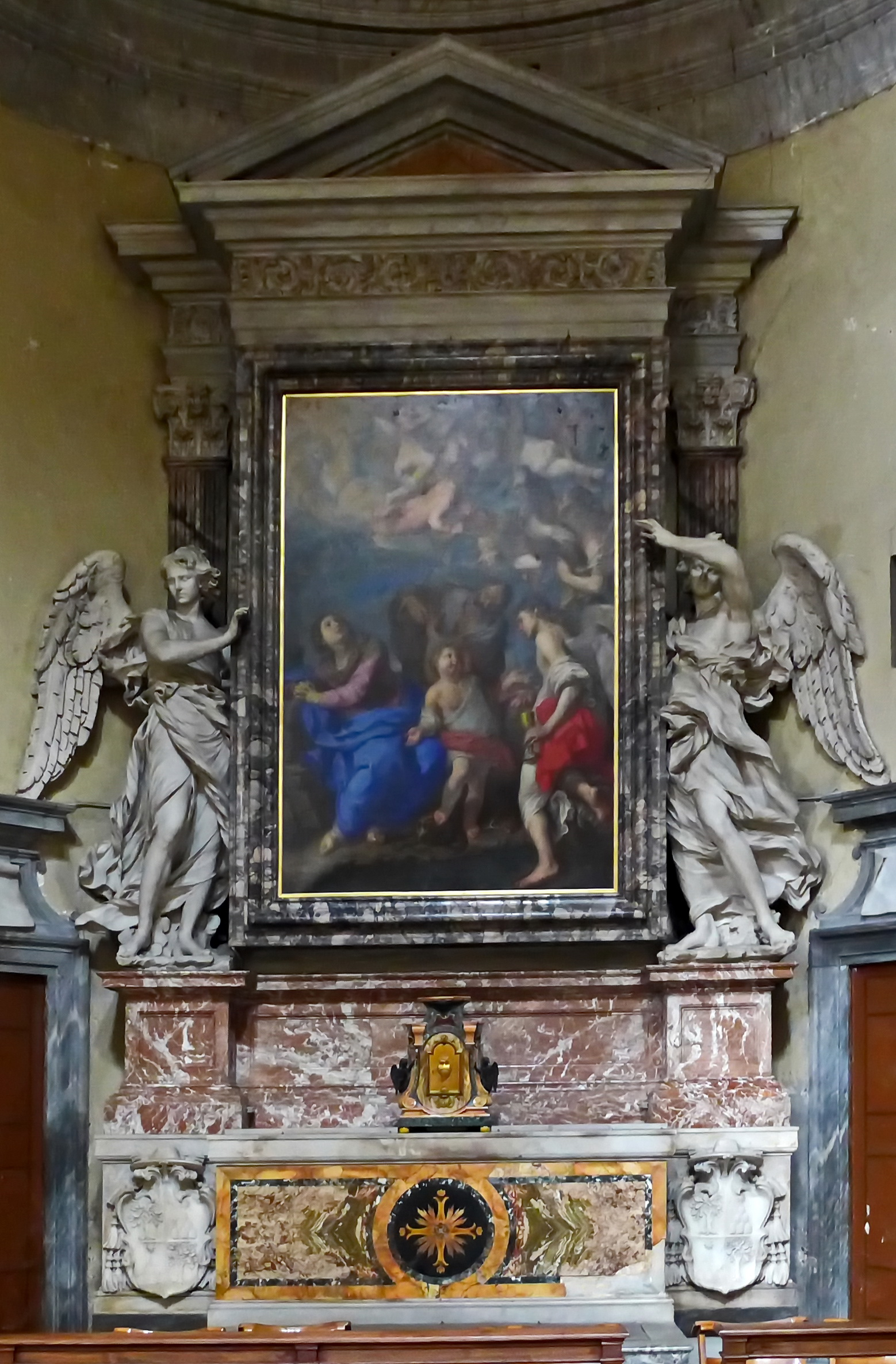
The Altar of the Holy Family in the right transept

The altar was executed by stonemason Gabriele Renzi around 1658. The altarpiece for the left side altar was entrusted to Bernardino Mei, a painter from Siena, who was called to Rome by Pope Alexander VII in 1657 and there he made friends with Bernini. He got 200 scudi for the commission on 11 August 1659. The painting is perfectly adapted to the Berninian ideal of «bel composto». The angel on the right is gracefully aligned with the marble angel supporting the altar. The iconography of the painting is rather complex and departs from the usual representation of the Rest on the Flight into Egypt.

In the middle the infant Jesus receives the message from the angel of God; both the child and the messenger are wearing similar red and white robes. The angel gives a chalice to the infant as the sign of his earthly mission. Jesus is watched by Saint Joseph who is standing behind him protectively. The child has put his right foot on a skull teeming with snakes, and with his left foot he is crushing one of them: the symbol of his triumph over evil and heresy. Mary is leaning on a rocky wall and she is looking up on the sky where cherubs are bringing the instruments of the Passion, a huge cross, the crown of thorns and the nails. The angel on the left holding a processional cross draped in clothes may be a symbol of resurrection. There is almost nothing on the painting indicating the flight to Egypt except a single palm tree in the background. According to tradition this tree gave shelter and nourishment to the Holy Family on their journey. Instead of a serene and bucolic scene Mei emphasized the impending suffering and the divine mission of Jesus.

The marble statues of the angels supporting the frame of the altar are attributed to Giovanni Antonio Mari (left) and Antonio Raggi (right).

=== Organ lofts ===
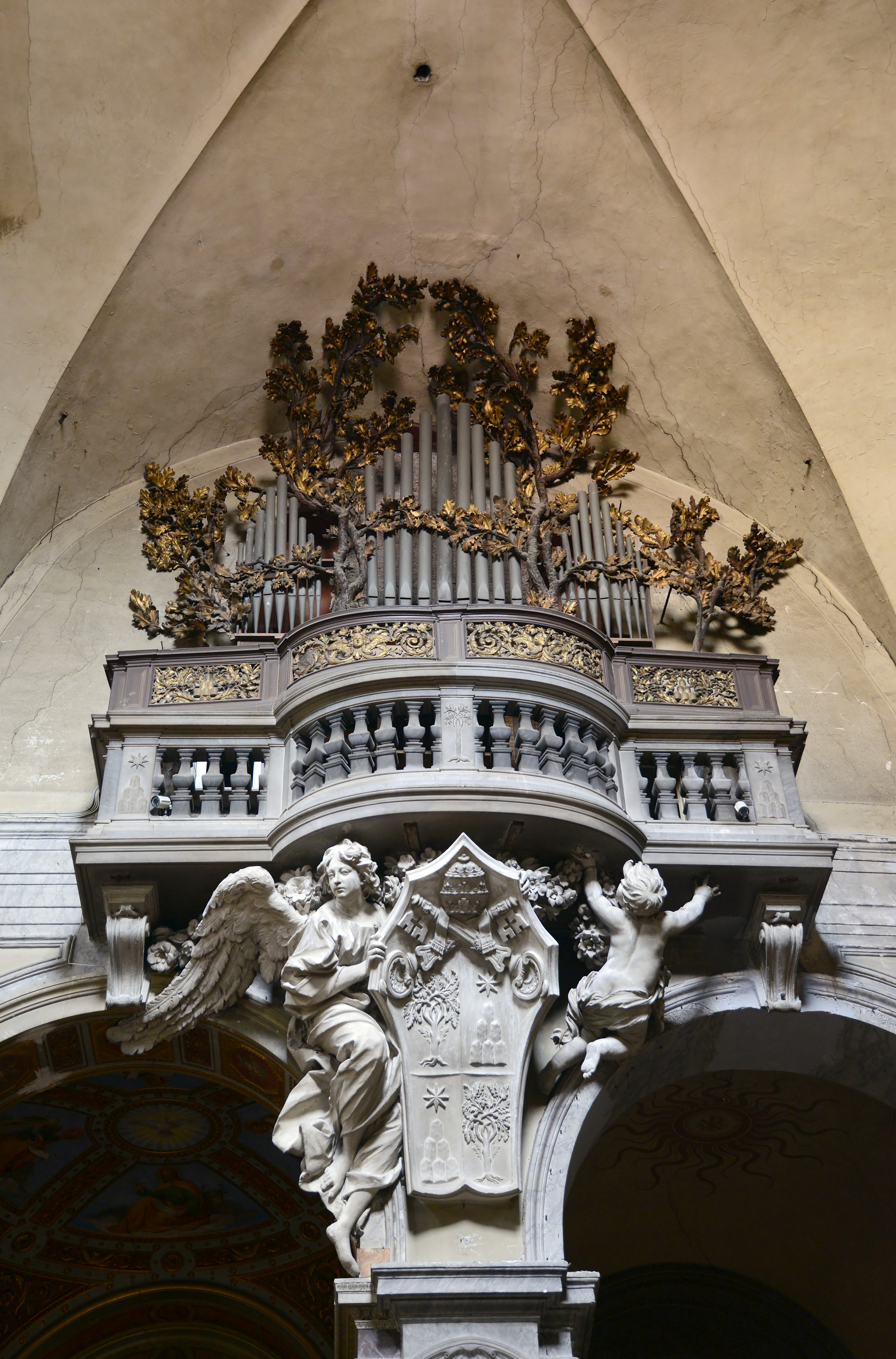
The right organ loft with the original organ-case

The organ in the right transept was originally built in 1499–1500 by Stefano Pavoni, magister organorum from Salerno; its case was decorated with the coat of arms of Pope Alexander VI who probably contributed to the expenses. During the Berninian reconstruction of the basilica this instrument was rebuilt by organ master Giuseppe Testa who also created a new organ for the left transept. Both organs has long since disappeared with only the organ-case in the right transept remaining in place. For the left cantoria a modern organ was made by Carlo Vegezzi Bossi which was inaugurated on 23 May 1906.

Bernini designed two elegant marble cantorie for the instruments which are supported by stucco angels and putti displaying rich garlands of flowers and the coats of arms of Pope Alexander VII. These organ lofts are display cases of the Chigi-Della Rovere dynastic symbols: the central newel post of the balustrade is decorated with the carving of an oak tree, the ancient symbol of the Della Rovere family, while the side pillars bear the mountain and the star symbol of the Chigis which reappear among the gilt wood carvings of the handrail among leafy oak branches. On the remaining organ-case the pipes are carried by four spreading, gnarled branches of a gilt oak tree complete with leaves and acorns.

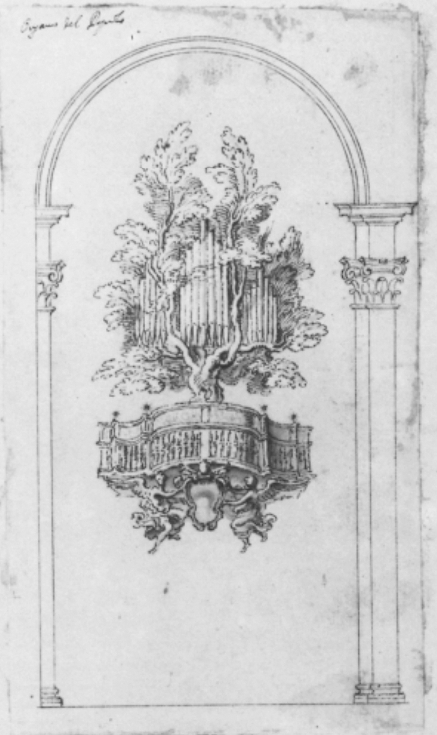
The second design of the organ-case from Bernini's workshop

The first design for the organ-case was more traditional with the superposed rows of the pipes set in an architectural framework defined by two columns and an arched pediment decorated with a sculpture group. The oak tree appeared as a tangle of roots, a felled stump and one tendril-like branch twining round the right-hand column as a symbol of natural renewal. A drawing of this design has been preserved in the Vatican Library. The second design, where the architectural frame has disappeared and the pipes were placed among the branches of a robust and leafy oak tree, is also preserved in the library. Neither of the two drawings can be attributed to Bernini himself but the iconography is closely integrated to his design for the reconstruction of the basilica.

This naturalistic and marvelous organ-tree could have been inspired by the descriptions of tree-shaped musical instruments in Byzantium and the eastern world or the singing fountains of Renaissance gardens in Italy. The tree had a particular significance in the context of Santa Maria del Popolo where the memory of Emperor Nero's evil walnut tree was still vivid. The flourishing oak tree also represented spiritual regeneration and the restoration of the church by the pope as part of his Christian renovatio Romae.

The stucco sculptures under the cantorie were modelled by Antonio Raggi under the supervision of Bernini in 1655–57. There are substantial differences between the two groups. Art historian Mark Weil suggested that the serene and well-composed ornament on the right was designed by Bernini, whereas the playful instability of the other is typical of Raggi's personal style.

=== Dome ===
The frescoes of the dome were painted on the underside of an inner brick shell. This thin and light structure was built to create a suitable surface for the painted decoration at an unknown date. The dome and the crossing is lit by eight large semicircular windows. The marble revetment and the double Corinthian pilasters on the side walls of the octagonal tambour appear Berninian, although similar double pilasters are visible on an earlier fresco in the vestibule of the Sala Sistina of the Vatican Library. On the same veduta a walkway with a balustrade is visible at the base of the tambour. This zone is emphasized by a strongly projecting stone cornice with acanthus modillions and varied rosettes.

The triumphal arch of the chancel is crowned with the painted stucco coat of arms of Cardinal Antonio Maria Sauli. The new main altar of the basilica and the redecoration of the arch at the behest of the Genoese cardinal was finished in 1627. The symbol of his family, a displayed eagle is set on an Italian escutcheon decorated with a cherub head and a cross. The coat of arms is supported by two angels portrayed as naked ephebes in an impeccably Classical fashion.

=== Apse ===
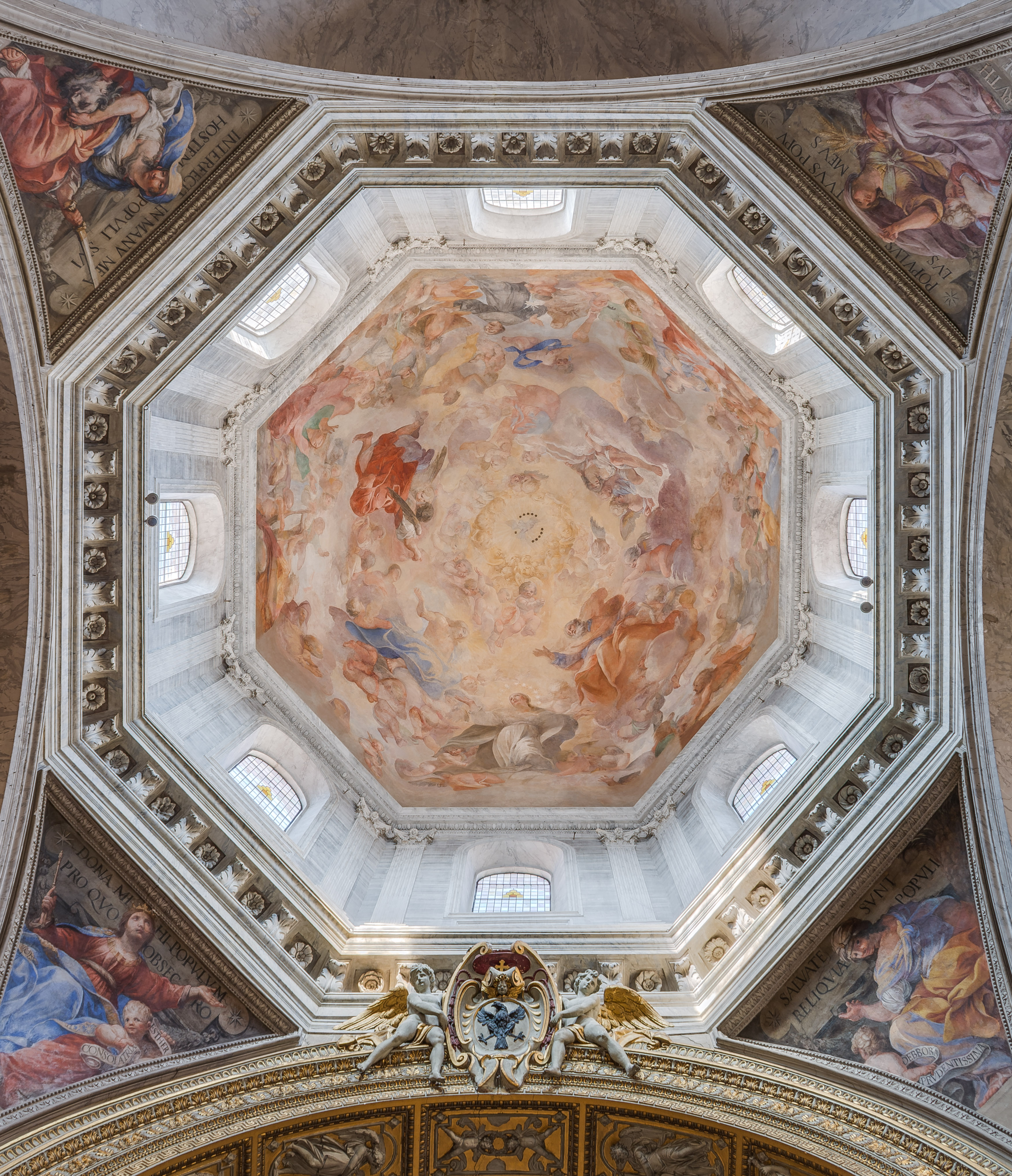
The dome.

The apse was designed by Donato Bramante. The oldest stained glass window in Rome can be found here, made by French artist Guillaume de Marcillat. Pinturicchio decorated the vault with frescoes, including the Coronation of the Virgin. The tombs of Cardinals Ascanio Sforza and Girolamo Basso della Rovere, both made by Andrea Sansovino, can also be found in the apse.

=== Furniture ===
The current furniture in the basilica is largely modern like the pews in the nave or the new versus populum altar, the ambo and the lectern in the crossing. However, there are a few pieces of Baroque furniture in the church: two almost identical holy water stoups made of coloured marbles and six wooden confessionals standing by the pillars between the nave and the aisles. These are almost identical pieces with the same basic features: segmental pediments and four double volutes with floral decorations on the sides. Nonetheless there are three different pairs: the two plain ones have no other decoration, the two "Chigi-type" confessionals bear the six mountains symbol of the papal family between two oak branches and have small cherubs for consoles, while the two "Madonna del Popolo-type" confessionals have a small carving of the Madonna and the child in the pediment (although one of carvings is missing).

=== Side chapels ===
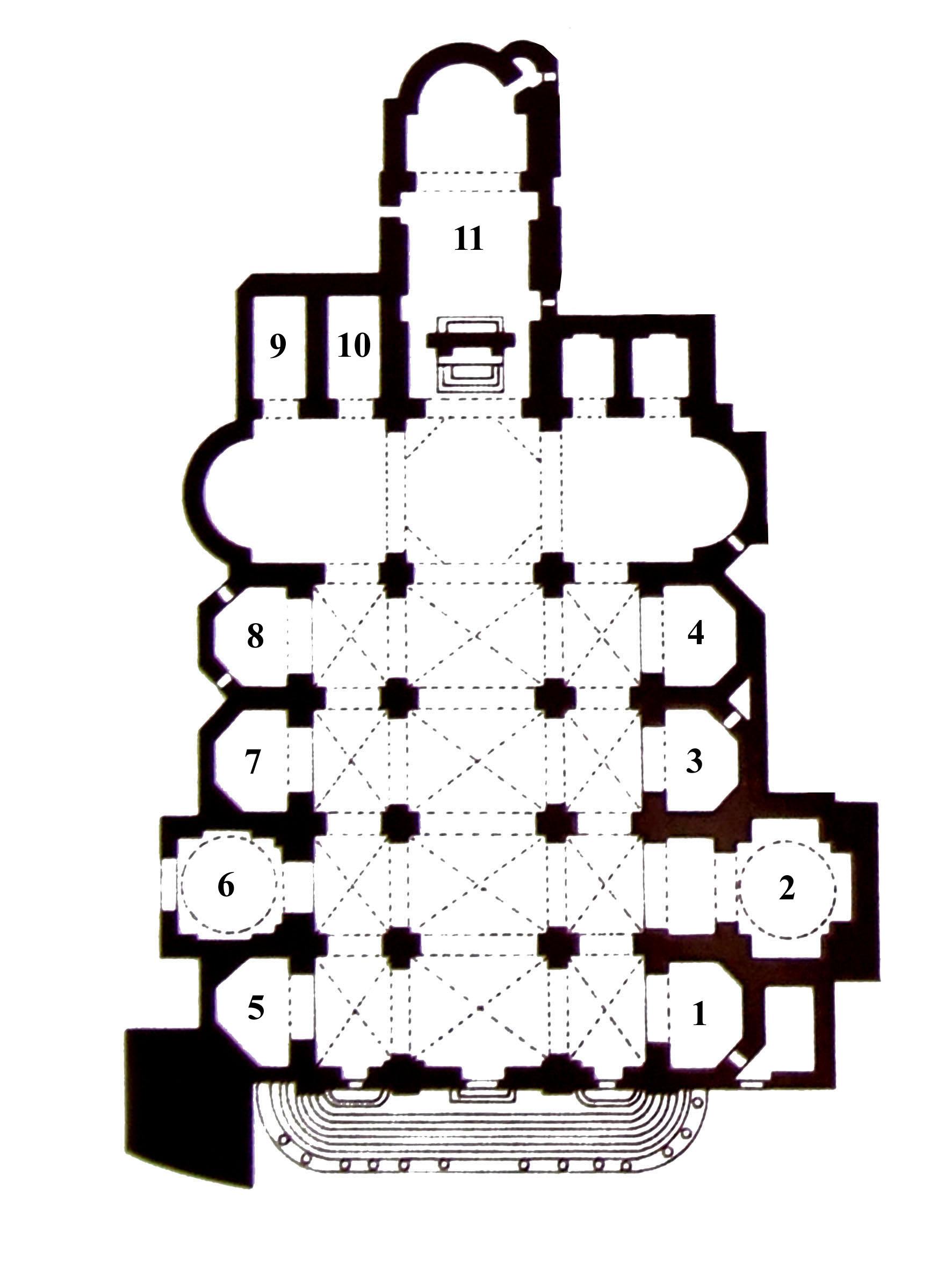
Plan of the basilica; the numbers identify the side chapels

==== Della Rovere Chapel ====
The Della Rovere (or Nativity) Chapel is the first side chapel on the right aisle. It was furnished by Cardinal Domenico della Rovere from 1477 after the reconstruction of the church by his relative, Pope Sixtus IV. The pictorial decoration is attributed to Pinturicchio and his school. The main altar-piece, The Adoration of the Child with St Jerome is an exquisite autograph work by Pinturicchio himself. The tomb of Cardinal Cristoforo della Rovere (died in 1478), a work by Andrea Bregno and Mino da Fiesole, was erected by his brother. On the right side the funeral monument of Giovanni de Castro (died 1506) is attributed to Francesco da Sangallo. The chapel is one of the best preserved monuments of quattrocento art in Rome.

==== Cybo Chapel ====
The Cybo Chapel was radically rebuilt by Cardinal Alderano Cybo (1613–1700) between 1682 and 1687 according to the plans of Carlo Fontana. For the beauty of its paintings, the preciousness of marble revetments covering its walls and the importance of the artists involved in its construction the chapel is regarded one of the most significant sacral monuments erected in Rome in the last quarter of the 17th century.

==== Basso Della Rovere Chapel ====
The Basso Della Rovere Chapel was furnished by Girolamo Basso della Rovere in the 1480s. The architecture is similar to the Chapel of the Nativity and the painted decoration is attributed to Pinturicchio and his workshop. The highlights of the chapel are the great fresco of the Madonna and Child Enthroned with Saints Augustine, Francis, Anthony of Padua and a Holy Monk above the altar, the Assumption of the Virgin Mary on the first wall and the illusionistic monochrome decoration of the pedestal with painted benches and martyrdom scenes. The original maiolica floor tiles from Deruta also survived.

==== Costa Chapel ====
The Costa Chapel follows the same plan as the Della Rovere chapels but it was furnished by Portuguese Cardinal Jorge da Costa who purchased it in 1488. The most important works of art are the paintings of the lunettes by the school of Pinturicchio depicting the four Fathers of the Church; the marble altar-piece by Gian Cristoforo Romano (c. 1505); and the funeral monument of Cardinal Costa by the school of Andrea Bregno. The bronze and marble funeral monument of Pietro Foscari from 1480 is preserved here.

==== Montemirabile Chapel ====
The chapel was named after Bishop Giovanni Montemirabile (†1479) and it was transformed into the baptistery of the basilica in 1561. The most valuable works of art in the chapel are the aediculae of the baptismal font and the font of the holy oil. These were assembled in 1657 from the 15th-century fragments of a demolished monument which had been created by the Bregno workshop. The tomb of Cardinal Antoniotto Pallavicini on the left wall was made by the same workshop in 1501.

==== Chigi Chapel ====
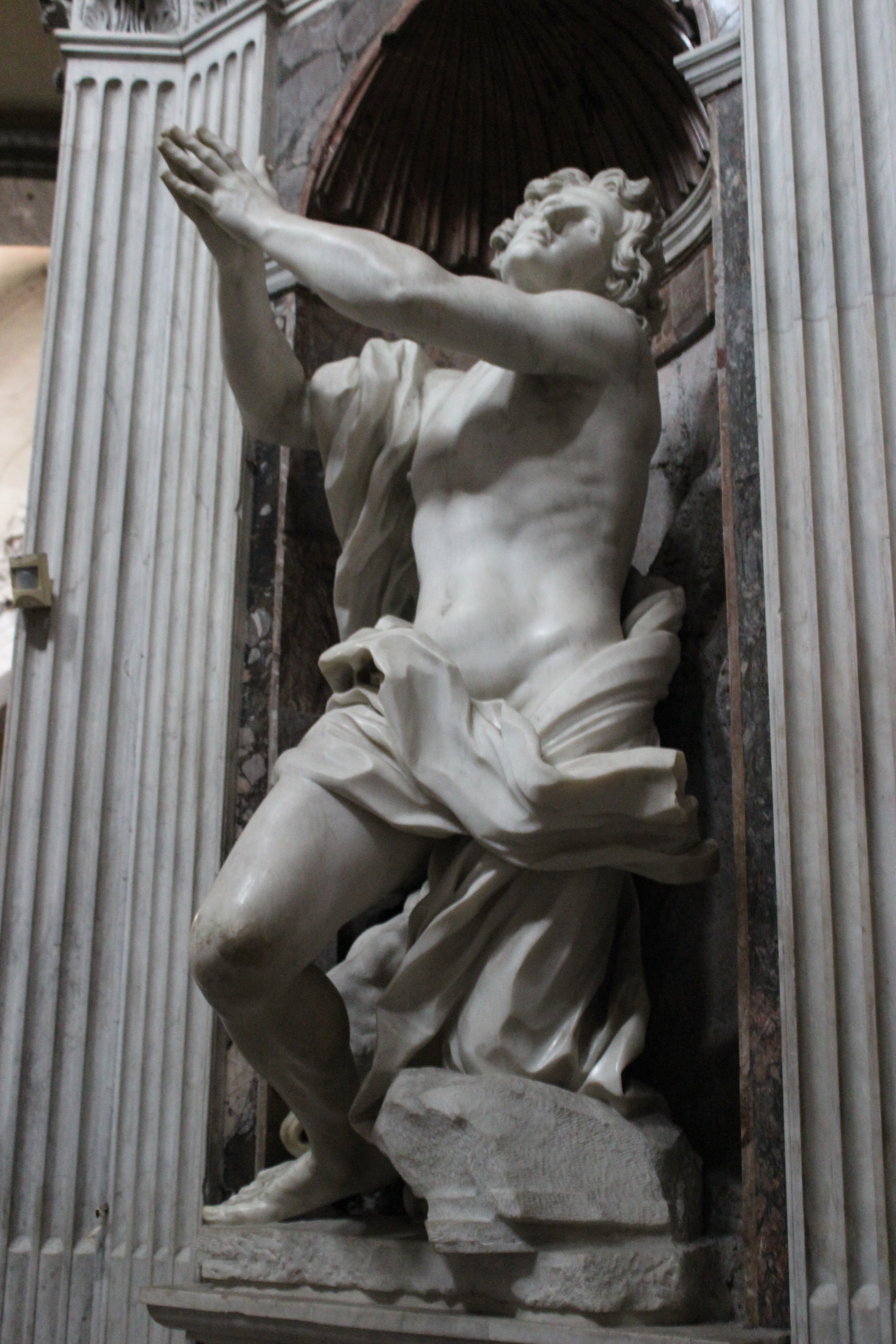
Bernini's Daniel in the Chigi Chapel

Banker Agostino Chigi commissioned Raphael to design and decorate a funerary chapel for him around 1512–1514. The chapel is a treasure trove of Italian Renaissance and Baroque art and is considered among the most important monuments in the basilica. The dome of the centralized octagonal chapel is decorated with Raphael's mosaics, the Creation of the World. The statues of Jonah and Elijah were carved by Lorenzetto. The chapel was later completed by Gian Lorenzo Bernini for Fabio Chigi. His additions include the sculptures of Habakkuk and the Angel and Daniel and the Lion.

==== Mellini Chapel ====
The chapel, which was dedicated to Saint Nicholas of Tolentino, is one of the original 15th-century hexagonal side chapels of the basilica, but its inner decoration was changed during the later centuries. It has been the funerary chapel of the Mellini family for centuries and contains several monuments among them the works of Alessandro Algardi and Pierre-Étienne Monnot. The frescos of the vault were created by Giovanni da San Giovanni in 1623–27.

==== Cybo-Soderini Chapel ====
The Chapel of the Crucifixion or the Cybo-Soderini Chapel was remodelled in the Baroque era when a Flemish artist, Pieter van Lint executed its cycle of frescos on the vault and the lunettes which depict Angels with the Symbols of the Passion and Prophets. Two big frescos on the side walls show scenes from The Legend of the True Cross. There is a 15th-century wooden crucifix above the main altar in a Corinthian aedicule. The chapel was restored by Lorenzo Soderini in 1825.

==== Theodoli Chapel ====
The chapel is a hidden gem of Roman Mannerism and a major work painter and stuccoist Giulio Mazzoni. It was also called Cappella Santa Caterina «del Calice» or «del Cadice» after the classicising marble statue of Saint Catherine on the altar, the stucco chalices on the spandrels and the title of its patron, Girolamo Theodoli, Bishop of Cádiz. The decoration was originally commissioned by the first owner, Traiano Alicorni in 1555, the work was restarted under a new patron, Girolamo Theodoli in 1569 and finished around 1575.

==== Cerasi Chapel ====
The Cerasi Chapel holds two famous canvases painted by Caravaggio – Crucifixion of St. Peter and Conversion on the Way to Damascus (1600–01). These are probably the most important works of art in the basilica. Situated between the two works of Caravaggio is the altarpiece Assumption of the Virgin by Annibale Carracci.

==== Feoli and Cicada Chapels ====
The two identical chapels opening in the right transept are relatively insignificant in terms of artistic value in comparison with the other side chapels of the church. Both were built during Bernini's intervention in the 17th century but their present decoration is much later. The most significant work of art is the fragmented sepulchral monument of Odoardo Cicada, the Bishop of Sagona by Guglielmo della Porta which is dated around 1545. The tomb, which was originally bigger and more ornate, is located in the Cicada (or Saint Rita) Chapel.

=== Monuments ===
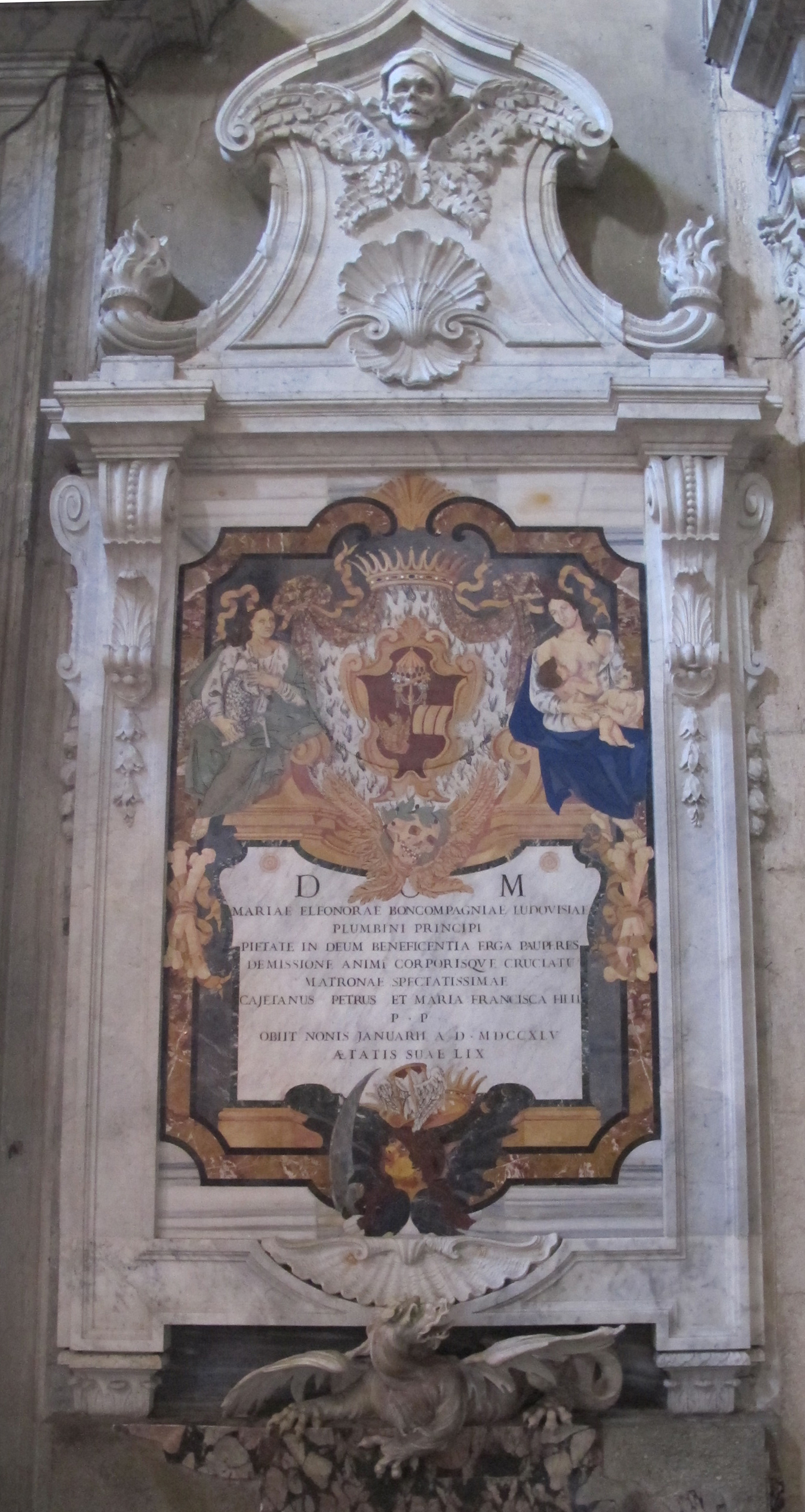
Monument of Maria Eleonora Boncompagni

The church was a favourite burial place for the Roman aristocracy, clergy and literati, especially after Bernini's intervention. Besides the tombs in the side chapels the most notable monuments are:

==== Maria Eleonora Boncompagni Ludovisi ====
The first monument as you enter the basilica is the wall tomb of Maria Eleonora I Boncompagni, the sovereign Princess of Piombino right by the door on the counterfaçade. The princess died in 1745 after visiting a hospital. Her tomb was designed by Domenico Gregorini in 1749.

The funeral monument is a typical Late Baroque artwork with distinctly macabre details. On the base there is a winged dragon, the symbol of the Boncompagni family. The plaque of the epitaph is made of polished, colored stones in pietre dure. The inscription is surmounted by the personification of Time (a winged skull), the coat-of-arms of the Principality of Piombino and two allegorical figures (Charity and Meekness). The plaque is set in a white marble frame with a conch in the lower part and a gable at the top with a shell, two flaming torches and another winged skull.

==== Giovanni Battista Gisleni ====
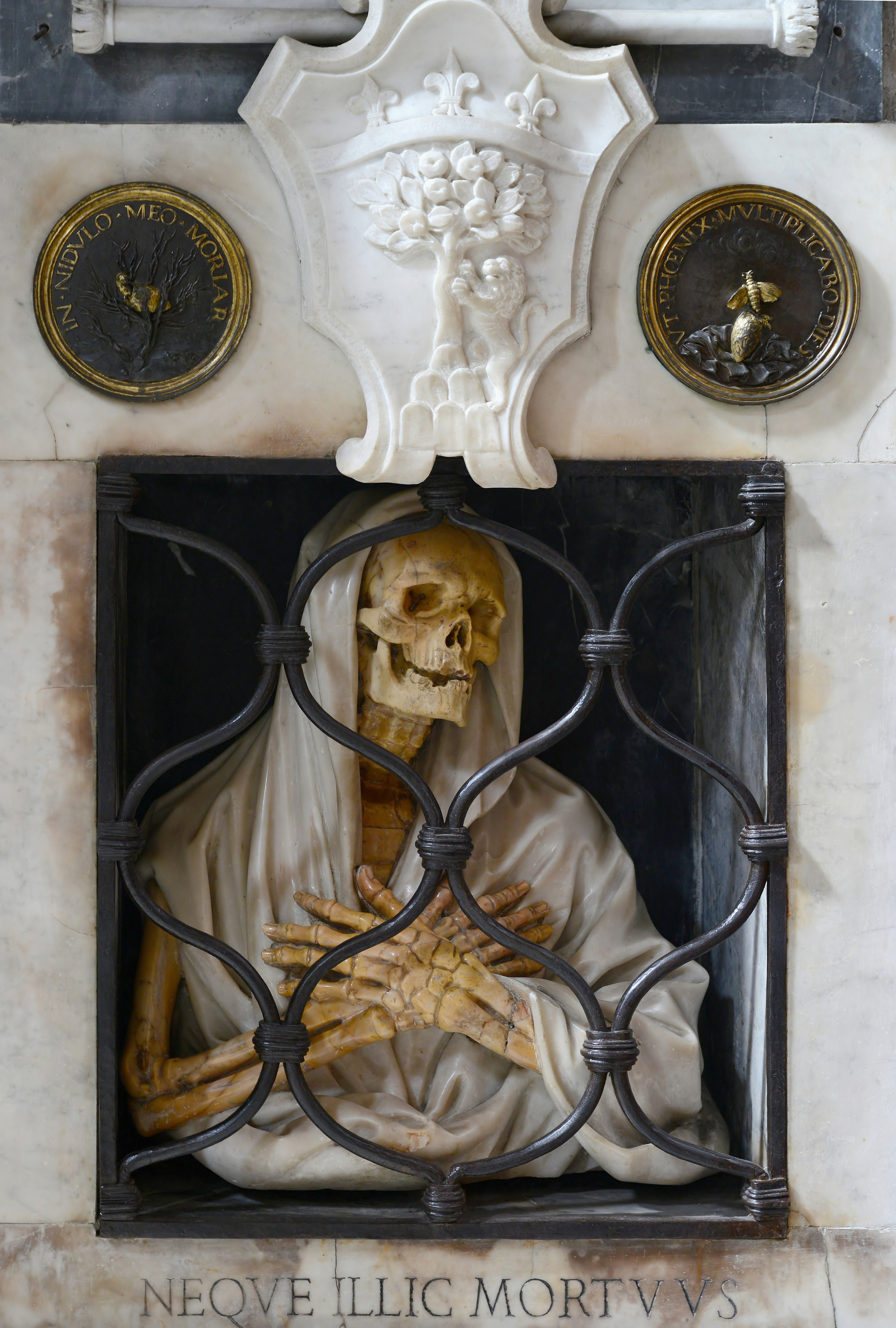
The lower part of the Gisleni monument

The tomb of Giovanni Battista Gisleni, an Italian Baroque architect and stage designer who worked for the Polish royal court during the years 1630–1668, is probably the most macabre funeral monument in the basilica. It is set between a wooden booth and a stone half-column on the right side of the counterfaçade. The memorial was designed and installed by the architect himself in 1670 two years before his death.

The upper part of the monument is a stone plaque with a long inscription and the portrait of the deceased in a tondo which was painted by a Flemish portraitist, Jacob Ferdinand Voet. There is a painted canopy supported by angels on the wall. The lower part is more interesting: a skeleton is peeping through a window behind an iron grill. The sinister, shrouded figure is facing towards the viewer with his bony hands clutched on his breast. The stone frame of the window is decorated with a coat-of-arms and two bronze medallions. The left one shows a tree with its branches cut but sprouting new shoots and containing a caterpillar spinning its cocoon, while the right one shows the metamorphosis of the caterpillar into a moth. These are the symbols of death and resurrection. The inscriptions convey the same message: In nidulo meo moriar ("in my nest I die" i.e. in the city of Rome) and Ut phoenix multiplicabo dies ("as a phoenix I multiply my days"). There are two enigmatic inscriptions on the upper and lower part of the monument: Neque hic vivus and Neque illic mortuus ("Neither living here, nor dead there").

On this tomb the skeleton is not the personification of Death as in other Baroque tombs but a representation of the deceased (the transi image) on his way towards the resurrection and due to this "death became a symbol for life".

==== Maria Flaminia Odescalchi Chigi ====
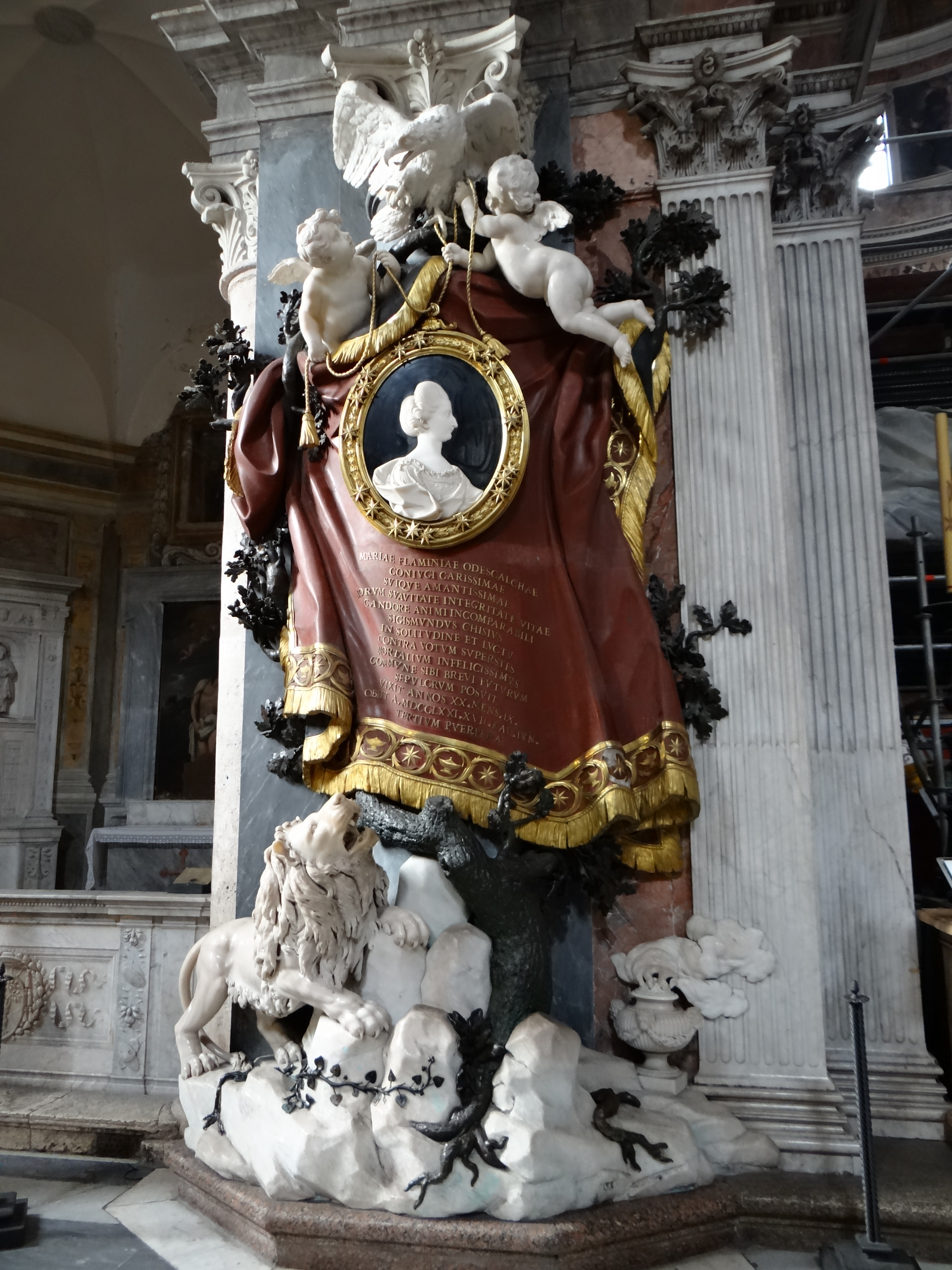
Monument of Maria Flaminia Odescalchi Chigi

The funeral monument of Princess Maria Flaminia Odescalchi Chigi is sometimes dubbed the "last Baroque tomb in Rome". It is probably the most visually stunning, exuberant and theatrical sepulchral monument in the basilica. It was built in 1772 for the young princess, the first wife of Don Sigismondo Chigi Albani della Rovere, the 4th Prince of Farnese, who died in childbirth at the age of 20. It was designed by Paolo Posi, a Baroque architect who was famous for his ephemeral architecture built for celebrations, and executed by Agostino Penna. The tomb is located by the pillar between the Chigi and Montemirabile Chapels.

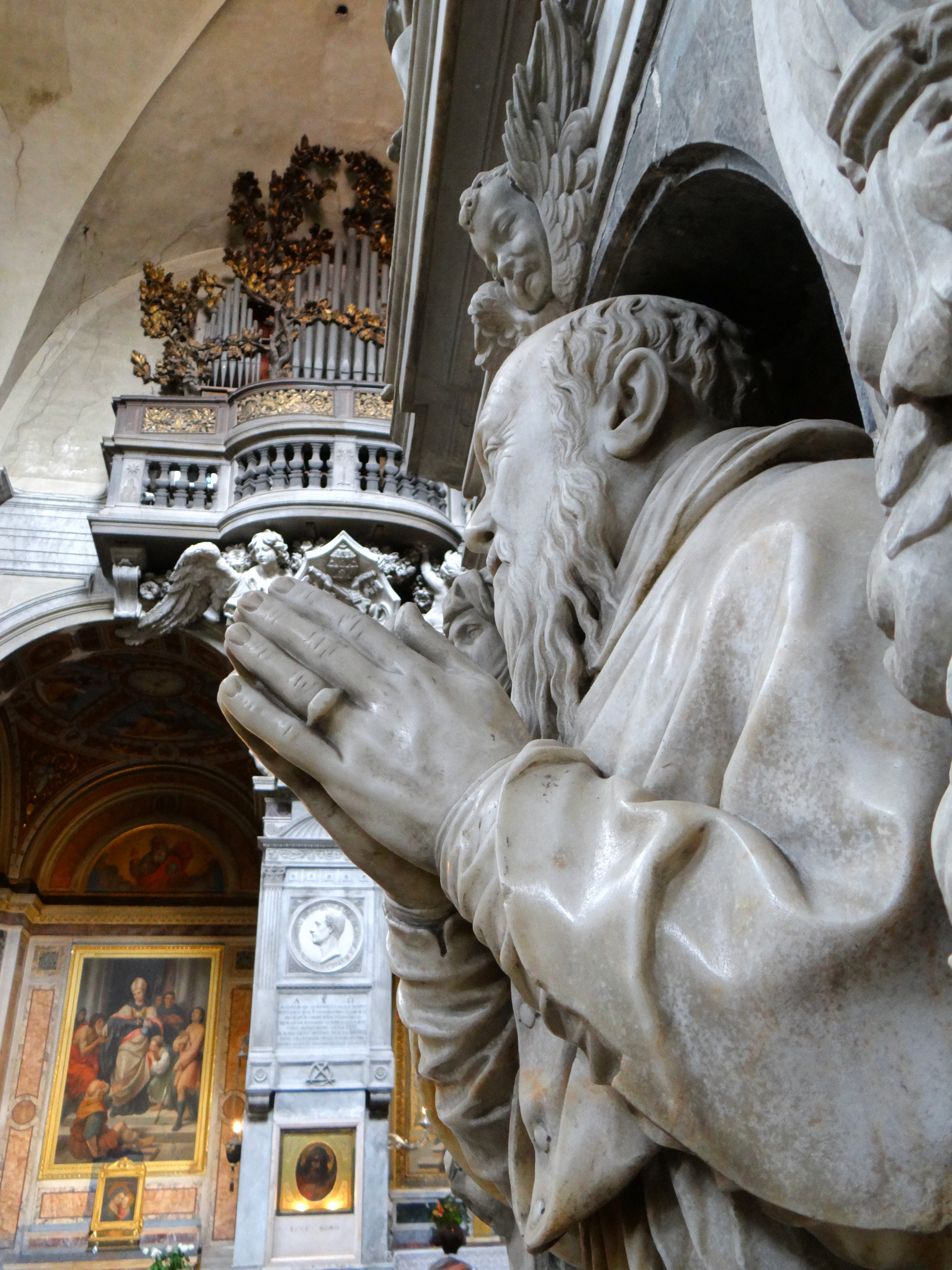
The portrait of Cardinal Gian Girolamo Albani by Paracca.

The monument shows the influence of Bernini's tomb for Maria Raggi in Santa Maria sopra Minerva. Posi used the heraldic symbols of the Chigi and the Odescalchi to celebrate the intertwining of the two princely families. In the lower part of the monument a white marble Odescalchi lion is climbing a mountain of the Chigi; to the right a smoking incense burner alludes to the Odescalchis again. A gnarled bronze oak tree (Chigi) grows from the mountain with a huge red marble robe on its branches. The robe is hemmed with gold and decorated with an epitaph made of golden letters and also the stars of the Chigi and the incense burners of the Odescalchi at the lower part. In the upper part of the tomb a white marble eagle and two angels are carrying the black and white marble portrait of dead which is set in a richly decorated golden medaillon.

In the 19th century the monument was dismissed as tawdry. Stendhal called it an "outburst of the execrable taste of the 18th century" in his 1827 Promenades dans Rome.

==== Giovanni Gerolamo Albani ====
One of the most important Mannerist funeral monuments in the basilica is the tomb of Cardinal Gian Girolamo Albani, an influential politician, jurist, scholar and diplomat in the papal court in the last decades of the 16th century. He died in 1591. The Late Renaissance monument is one of the main works of the Roman sculptor, Giovanni Antonio Paracca. The bust of the Cardinal is a realistic portrait of the old statesman. He is seen praying with his head turned toward the main altar. Facing this monument the cenotaph of Cardinal Giovanni Battista Pallavicino (1596) is likewise attributed to Paracca.

==== Ludovico Podocataro ====
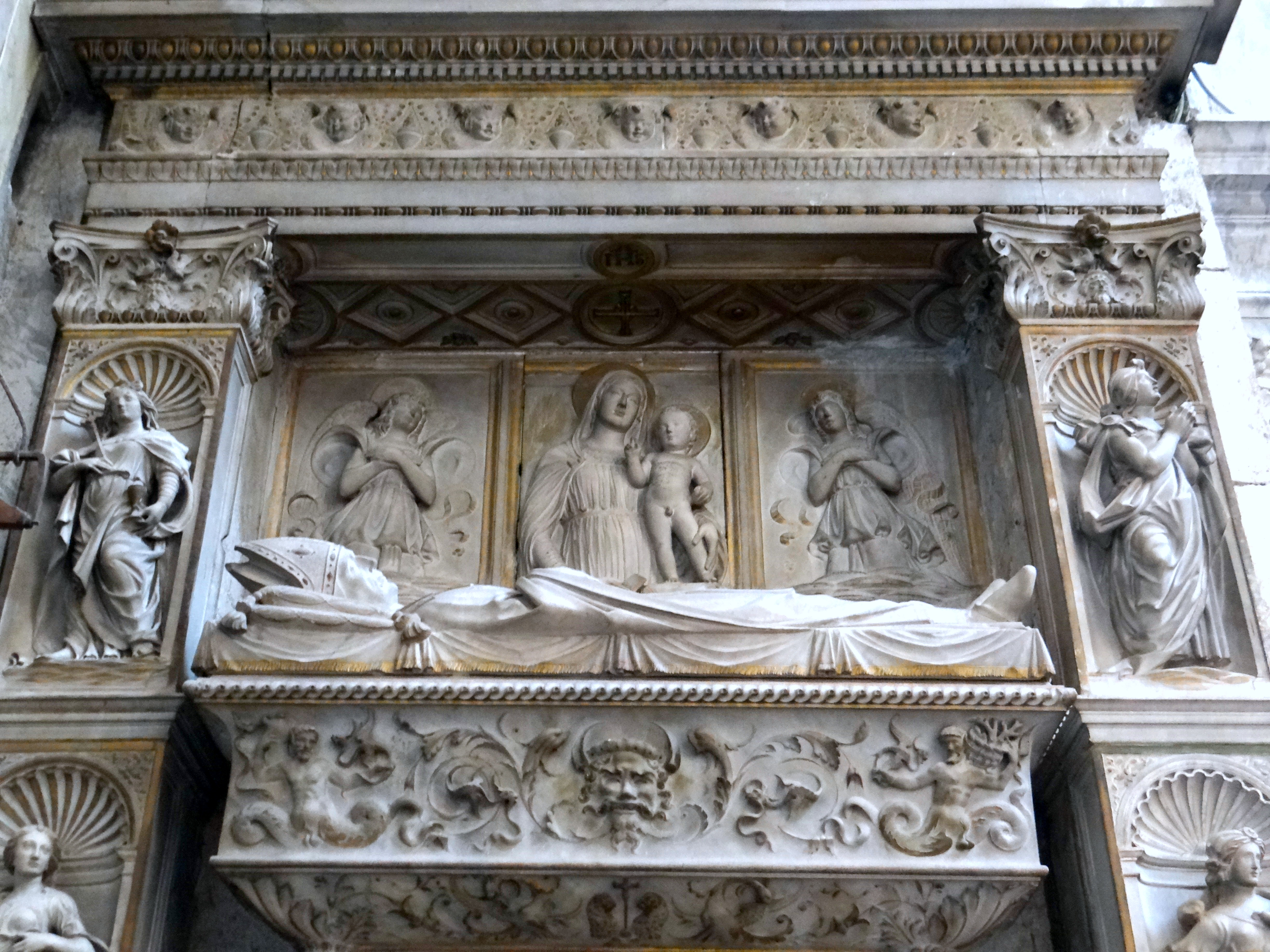
The reclining statute of Cardinal Podocataro with remnants of gilding.

The wall tomb of the Cypriot Cardinal Ludovico Podocataro, secretary and physician of Pope Alexander VI, is a monumental work of Roman Renaissance sculpture. The prominent humanist and papal diplomat was buried on 7 October 1504 with great pomp; the location of the tomb in the right transept was originally close to the funerary chapel of the Borgia family, Podocataro's patrons, but the chapel is no longer extant.

Originally the monument had a dual function as an altar and tomb. It was probably commissioned by the cardinal between 1497, when he made a donation to the Augustinian church and 1504, his death. The master(s) of the monument are unknown but on stylistic grounds it is assumed to be the work of different groups of sculptors. The architectural composition is traditional and somewhat conservative for the beginning of the 16th century, it follows the models set by Andrea Bregno.

==== Bernardino Lonati ====
The wall tomb of Cardinal Bernardino Lonati is similar to the coeval sepulchre of Ludovico Podocataro, and they both belong to the group of monuments from the age of Pope Alexander VI. The monument was financed by Cardinal Ascanio Sforza after the death of his protégée on 7 August 1497, not long after Lonati had led an unsuccessful expedition against the Orsini family by order of the Pope. The architectural composition of the monument follows the models set by Andrea Bregno.

== List of cardinal priests ==
The following is a list of cardinal priests at Santa Maria del Popolo.

Image	Name	Dates	Notes
	Tolomeo Gallio	20 Apr 1587 – 2 Dec 1589	Appointed Cardinal Bishop of Albano
	Scipione Gonzaga	15 Jan 1588 – 11 Jan 1593	Died
	Ottavio Acquaviva d'Aragona	15 Mar 1593 – 22 Apr 1602	Transferred to Santi Giovanni e Paolo al Celio
	Francesco Mantica	17 Jun 1602 – 28 Jan 1614	Died
	Filippo Filonardi	9 Jul 1614 – 29 Sep 1622	Died
	Guido Bentivoglio	26 Oct 1622 – 7 May 1635	Transferred to Santa Prassede
	Lelio Biscia	9 Feb 1637 – 19 Nov 1638	Died
	Lelio Falconieri	31 Aug 1643 – 14 Dec 1648	Died
	Mario Theodoli	28 Jan 1649 – 27 Jun 1650	Died
	Fabio Chigi	12 Mar 1652 – 7 Apr 1655	Elected Pope Alexander VII
	Gian Giacomo Teodoro Trivulzio	14 May 1655 – 3 Aug 1656	Died
	Favio Chigi	23 Apr 1657 – 18 Mar 1686	Appointed Cardinal Bishop of Albano
	Savo Millini	12 Aug 1686 – 12 Dec 1689	Appointed Cardinal Bishop of Albano
	Francesco del Giudice	10 Apr 1690 – 30 Mar 1700	Transferred to Santa Sabina
	Andrea Santacroce	30 Mar 1700 – 10 May 1712	Died
	Agostino Cusani	30 Jan 1713 – 27 Dec 1730	Died
	Camillo Cybo	8 Jan 1731 – 20 Dec 1741	Transferred to Santa Maria degli Angeli e dei Martiri
	Francesco Ricci	23 Sept 1743 – 8 Jan 1755	Died
	Franz Konrad von Rodt	2 Aug 1758 – 16 Oct 1775	Died
	Giovanni Carlo Bandi	18 Dec 1775 – 23 Mar 1784	Died
	Giovanni Maria Riminaldi	11 Apr 1785 – 29 Jan 1789	Transferred to San Silvestro in Capite
	Francesco Maria Pignatelli	21 Feb 1794 – 2 Apr 1800	Transferred to Santa Maria in Trastevere
	Ferdinando Maria Saluzzo	20 Jul 1801 – 28 May 1804	Transferred to Sant'Anastasia al Palatino
	Francesco Cesarie Leoni	1 Oct 1817 – 25 Jul 1830	Died
	Francisco Javier de Cienfuegos y Jovellanos	28 Feb 1831 – 21 Jun 1847	Died
	Jacques-Marie Antoine Célestin Dupont	4 Oct 1847 – 26 May 1859	Died
	Carlo Sacconi	30 Sep 1861 – 8 Oct 1870	Appointed Cardinal Bishop of Palestrina
	Flavio Chigi	15 Jun 1874 – 15 Feb 1885	Died
	Alfonso Capecelatro	15 Jan 1886 – 14 Nov 1912	Died
	José Cos y Macho	2 Dec 1912 – 17 Dec 1919	Died
	Juan Soldevilla y Romero	22 Apr 1920 – 4 Jun 1923	Died
	George Mundelein	27 Mar 1924 – 2 Oct 1939	Died
	James McGuigan	18 Feb 1946 – 8 Apr 1974	Died
	Hyacinthe Thiandoum	24 May 1976 – 18 May 2004	Died
	Stanisław Dziwisz	24 May 2006 – present	Current cardinal priest

== See also ==
- Late medieval domes
- Italian Renaissance domes

== Books ==
- Raffaele Colantuoni, La chiesa di S. Maria del Popolo negli otto secoli dalla prima sua fondazione, 1099-1899: storia e arte (Roma: Desclée, Lefebvre, 1899).
- John K. G. Shearman, The Chigi Chapel in S. Maria Del Popolo (London: Warburg Institute, 1961).

Preceded by Santa Maria in Ara Coeli	Landmarks of Rome; Santa Maria del Popolo	Succeeded by Santa Maria sopra Minerva
