= Chigi Chapel =

Chapel in the church of Santa Maria del Popolo, Rome

- Cappella Chigi
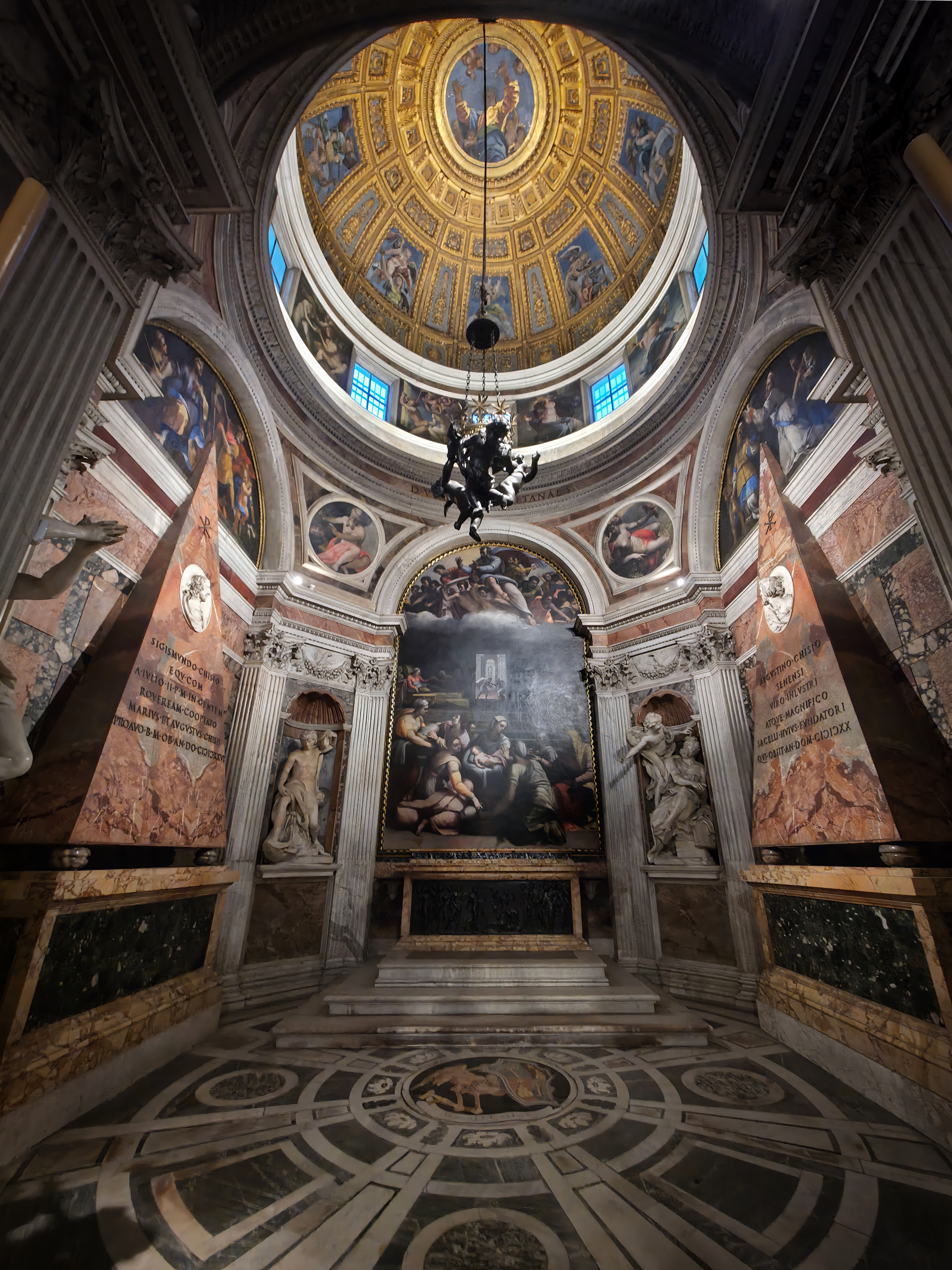

Religion
- Affiliation: Roman Catholic
- Status: side chapel

Location
- Location: Basilica of Santa Maria del Popolo, Rome
- Interactive map of Chigi Chapel
- Coordinates: 41.911389°N 12.476389°E

Architecture
- Architects: Raphael, Gian Lorenzo Bernini
- Type: centralized octagonal chapel
- Style: Renaissance, Baroque
- Founder: Agostino Chigi
- Groundbreaking: 1507
- Completed: 1661
- Dome: 1

The Chigi Chapel or Chapel of the Madonna of Loreto (Italian: Cappella Chigi or Cappella della Madonna di Loreto) is the second chapel on the left-hand side of the nave in the Basilica of Santa Maria del Popolo in Rome. It is the only religious building of Raphael which has been preserved in its near original form. The chapel is a treasure trove of Italian Renaissance and Baroque art and is ranked among the most important monuments in the basilica.

== History ==
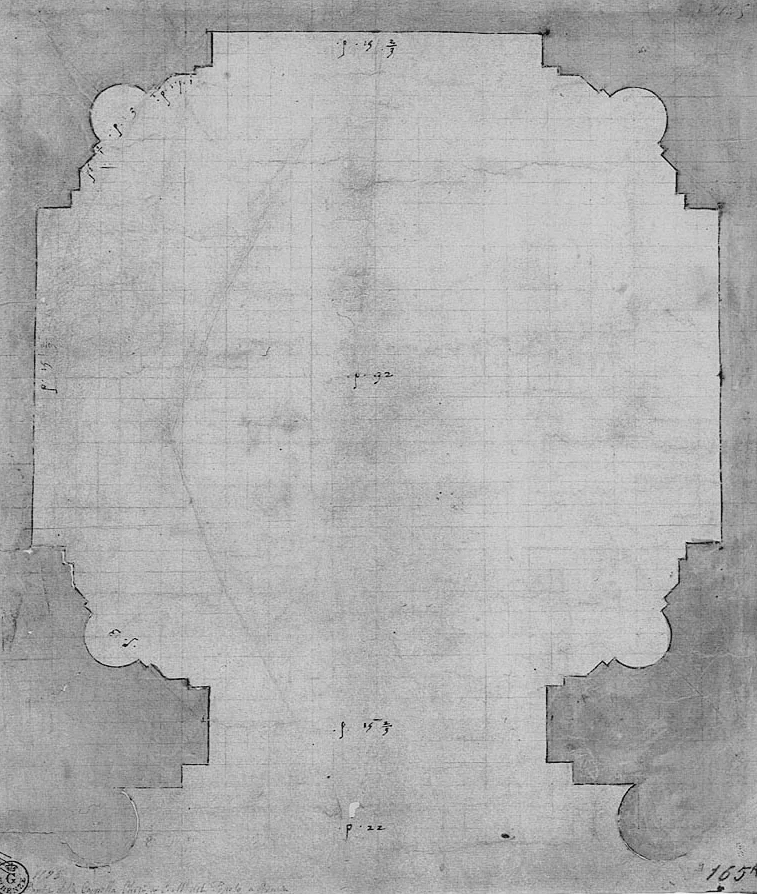
Raphael's ground plan, c. 1512

In 1507 Pope Julius II granted assent to the acquisition of a chapel in the church to his friend, the wealthy Sienese banker and financier of the Roman Curia, Agostino Chigi. Chigi had bought the second chapel in the north aisle, and its dedication was changed by a papal bull on 3 December 1507 from Saints Sebastian, Roch and Sigismund to the Madonna of Loreto, whose shrine Agostino was passionately devoted, and Saints Augustine and Sebastian. The bull also stated that the chapel was meant to be a mausoleum for Agostino and his heirs, "wishing to trade earthly things to heavenly and transitory to eternal by fortunate exchange."

The chapel was most probably rebuilt from scratch with Raphael as the architect. A ground plan attributed to the artist was preserved in the Uffizi in Florence, it was presumably drawn at the beginning of the work around 1512. An inscription on the dome marked the completion of the mosaics in 1516. In the following years Lorenzetto worked on the architectural decoration of the chapel and the statues under Raphael's patronage. The main iconographic theme of the chapel was the Resurrection; and visually it represented a marriage between Christianity and classical antiquity.

Agostino Chigi was buried in the half-finished chapel on 11 April 1520, and Raphael himself had died a few days before Agostino. Agostino Chigi's widow, Francesca Ordeasca commissioned the mosaicist, Luigi da Pace on 31 May 1520 to create another set of mosaics for the planned decoration of the tambour and the spandrels, but she died in the same year on 11 November. The simultaneous death of the artist, the patron and the patron's widow stymied work on the chapel. Agostino's younger brother, Sigismondo Chigi commissioned Lorenzetto to go on with Raphael's plan in 1521. But the work advanced slowly and the death of Sigismondo in 1526 left everything in limbo. Vasari records in his Lives, speaking about the statues of Jonah and Elijah:

"... the heirs of Agostino, with scant respect, allowed these figures to remain in Lorenzetto's workshop where they stood for many years. [...] Lorenzo, robbed for those reasons of all hope, found for the present that he had thrown away his time and labor."

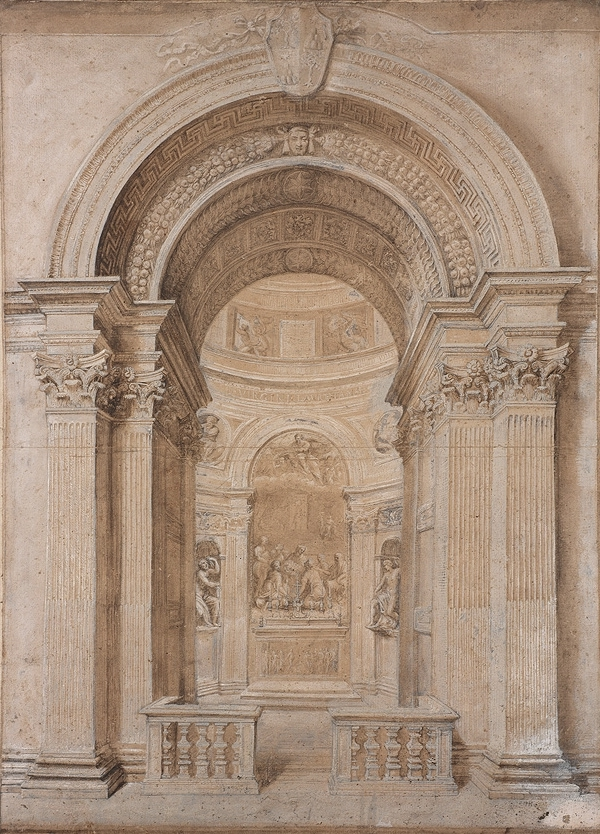
Drawing from the workshop of Gian Lorenzo Bernini, c. 1655

The main altar-piece, a mural depicting the Birth of the Virgin by Sebastiano del Piombo was begun in 1530 but it was left unfinished in 1534. Work on the chapel resumed in 1548 when Francesco Salviati was commissioned to create frescoes on the drum and the spandrels, although Raphael intended mosaics on these surfaces. He also completed the mural above the main altar. In 1552 Lorenzo Chigi paid his debt towards the heirs of Lorenzetto, and the two statues were finally placed in the chapel. After this the chapel was unveiled for the first time in 1554.

After Lorenzo Chigi's death and his burial in the chapel in 1573 the family disappeared from Rome, and their chapel became abandoned. In 1624 the funeral monument of Cardinal Antoniotto Pallavicini was moved into the chapel from the crossing and placed in front of the left wall by the friars. Sigismondo Chigi's great-grandson, Fabio made his first visit to the neglected chapel in 1626. He found it in a state of serious disrepair and complained about the presence of the Pallavicini monument in a letter to his uncle. Later he managed to transfer this tomb to the nearby baptistery but it was still in the chapel in 1629. Fabio Chigi regained the ownership after a three year long litigation with the Augustinians. Although the debate was settled in 1629, due to Chigi's long absence from Rome as he pursued his ecclesiastical career, the chapel remained neglected in the next decades.

More important changes were carried out by Gian Lorenzo Bernini between 1652 and 1655. The works began in earnest when Fabio Chigi became cardinal-priest of the basilica. Bernini finished the pyramids, laid the present floor, raised the altar, slightly enlarged the windows, renewed the lead roof, regilded and cleaned the dome. Painted wood panels by Raffaello Vanni were placed in the lunettes above the tombs. In 1656 and in 1661 Bernini filled the remaining niches with two new statues, depicting Daniel and the Lion and Habakuk and the Angel. Another restoration campaign was launched in 1682-88.

== Description ==
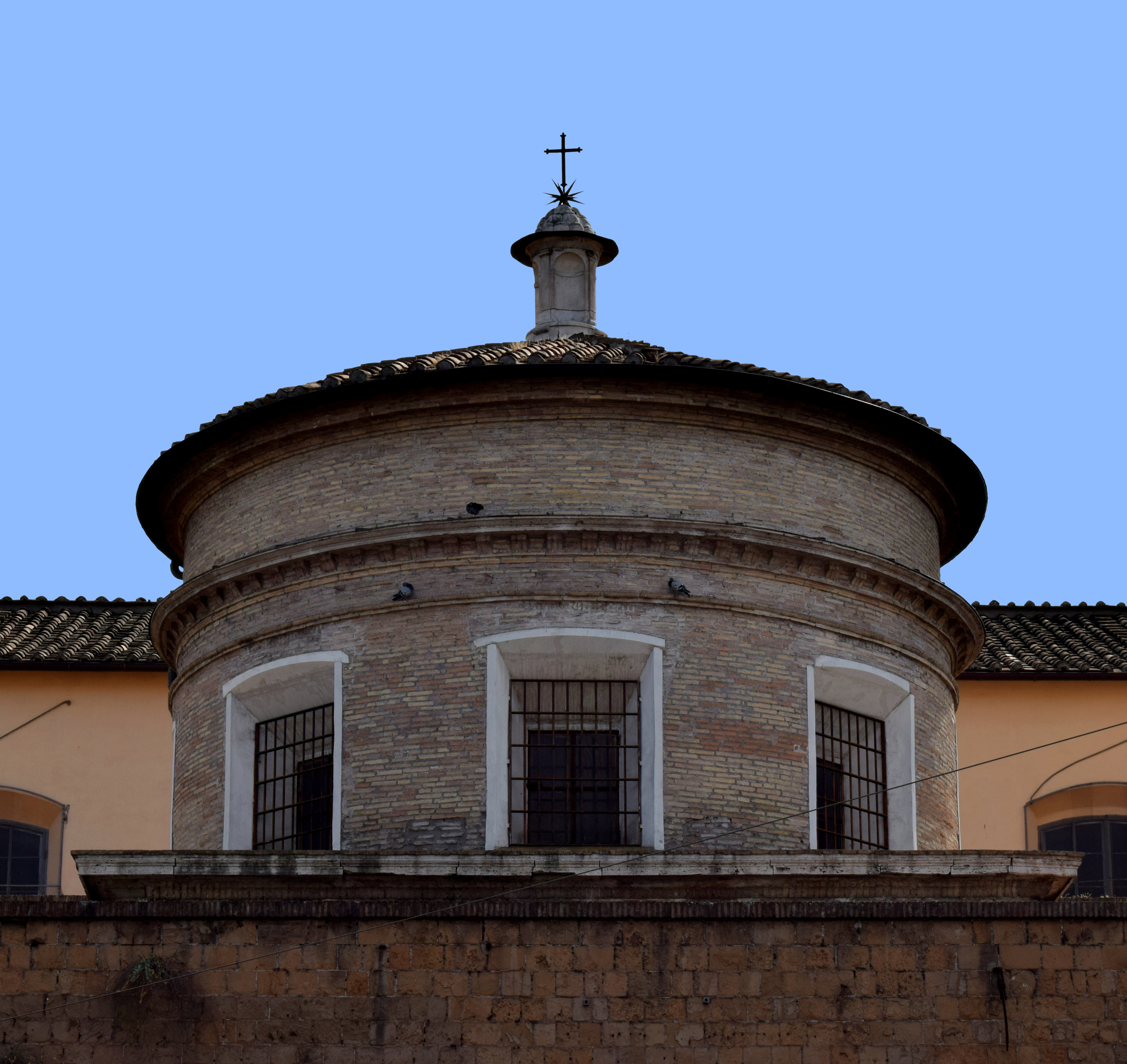
Exterior view of the upper part of the chapel behind the city wall.

Exterior

The exterior of the chapel is very simple: an oblong cube of exposed brick, surmounted by a cylindric tambour pierced with large rectangular windows. The cube is finished with a stone cornice while the tambour is decorated with a brick modillion trim. The low conical roof is covered with tiles but originally it was leaded. The dome is crowned by a small stone lanternino which has niches instead of windows between Tuscan pilasters and its base is decorated with four scrolls. This miniature round temple is topped with the symbols of the Chigi family, the mountains and the star with a cross. The exterior is practically invisible due to the location of the chapel behind the city wall, the Porta del Popolo and the main body of the basilica. Its simplicity and severe appearance was based on the reception of ancient Roman central-plan buildings for example the Temple of Minerva Medica.

Interior

Raphael's centralized plan was inspired by the designs of Bramante for the new St. Peter's Basilica. Another source of inspiration was the Pantheon with its dome, marble revetments and Corinthian pilasters. The simple cube is surmounted by a hemispherical dome resting on a high drum which is penetrated by a row of windows that allow light into the chapel. The trapezoidal pendentives were the characteristics of Bramante but the whole conception of space, which requires the viewer to look at from several points of view to capture its splendor, is new and unique. The side walls are made up of round-headed arches, of which only the entrance arch is open, the others are blind; they are alternated with canted corners in which shell-headed niches are framed between Corinthian pilasters. The subtle use of coloured marbles emphasizes the individual elements of the classical architecture.

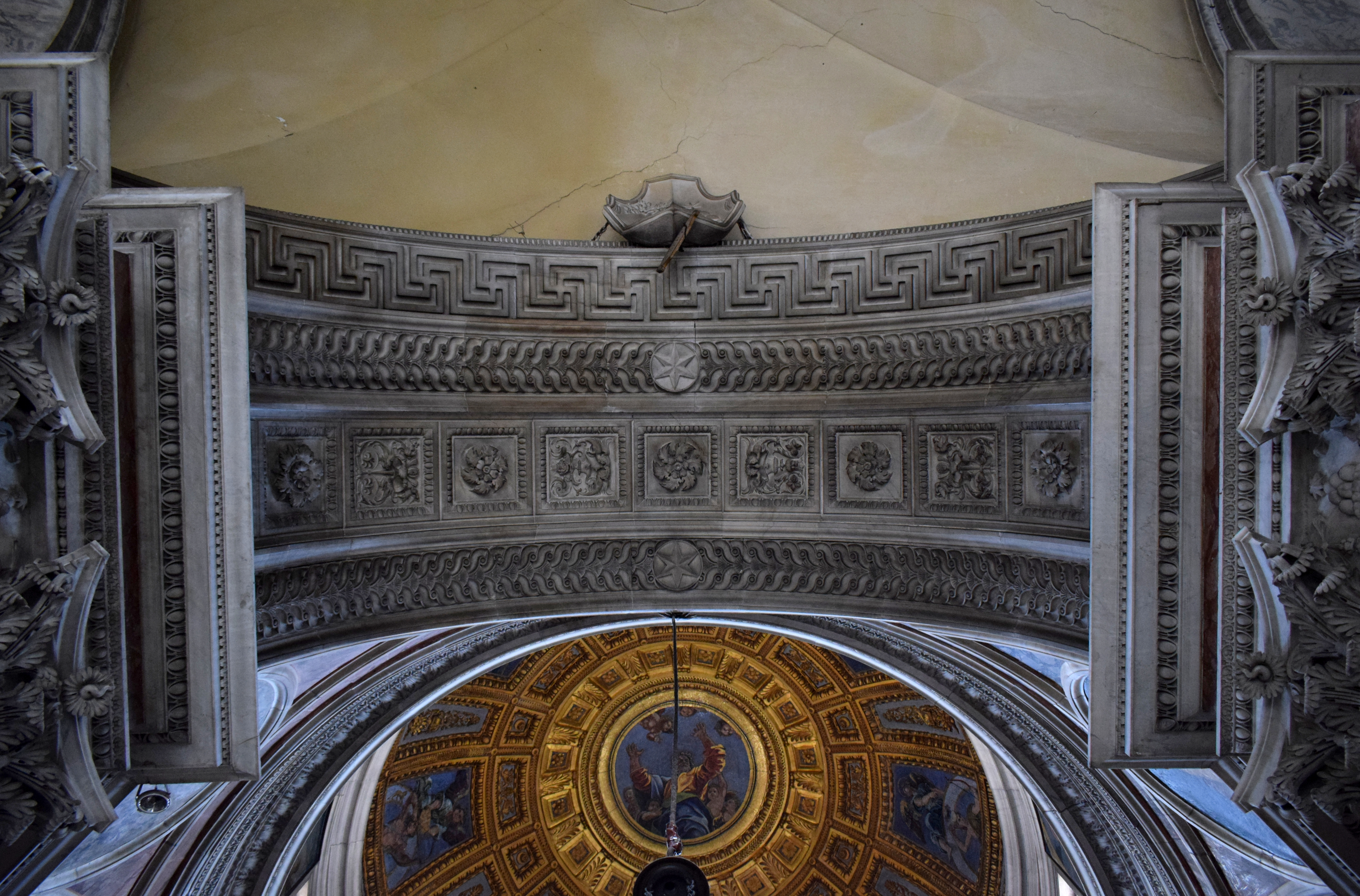
The soffit of the portal

The portal of the chapel is a Renaissance reinterpretation of the entrance bay of the Pantheon. It has a monumental effect with double transverse arches resting on huge Corinthian pilasters. The marble pilasters have cable-fluted shafts and beautifully carved, vivacious capitals which were practically copied from the much admired classical model. Raphael had studied the ancient building and created a precise architectural drawing of the entrance which is now preserved in the Uffizi. The entablature and the cornice is decorated with egg-and-dart, bead-and-reel and flower-patterned enrichments. The pilasters are of polished white Carrara marble with faint grey veins while the capitals are of unpolished pure white Carrara marble. The surfaces between the pilasters are covered with a coloured marble revetment, their slabs divided by white marble panels.

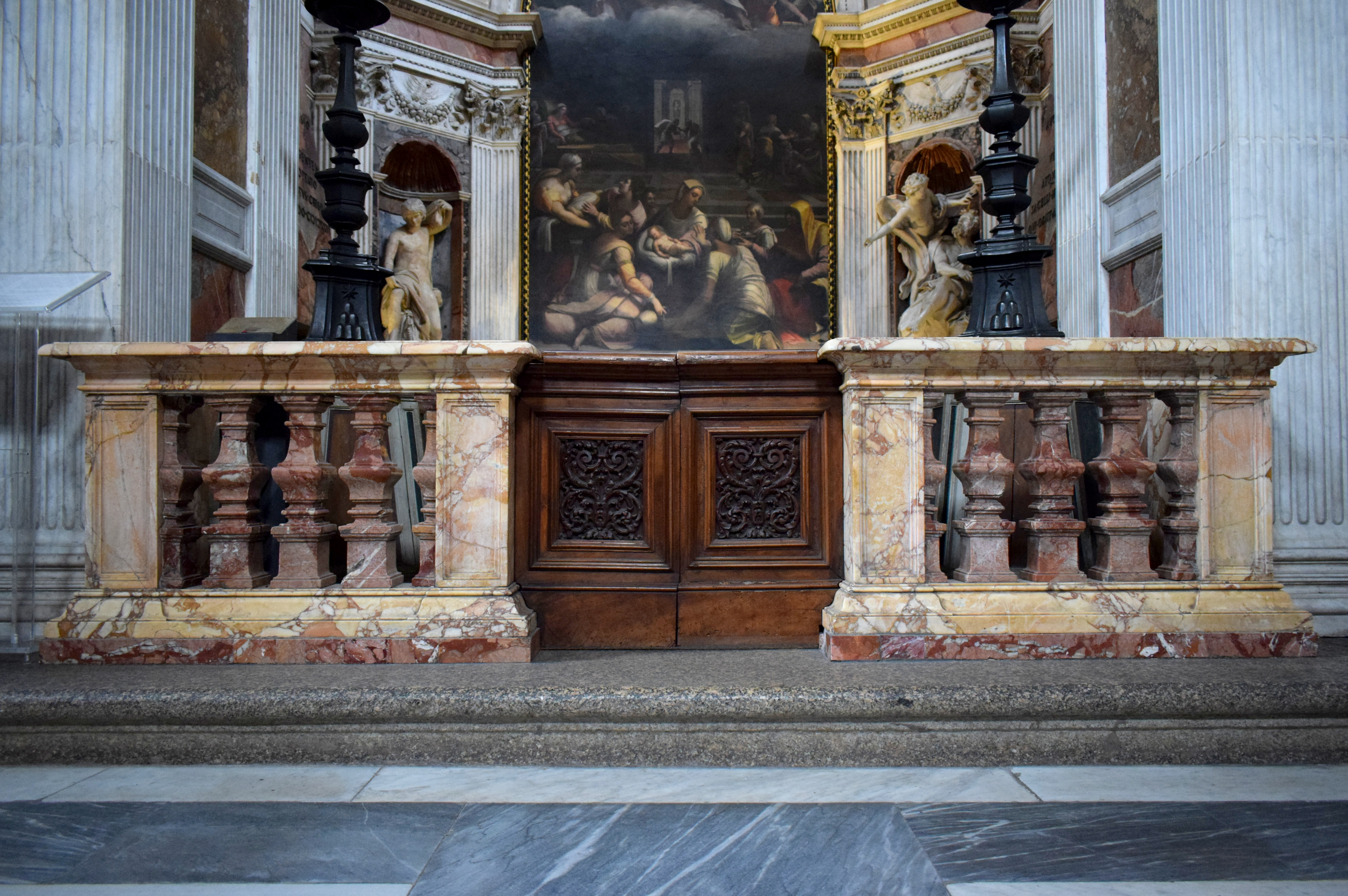
The giallo antico and portasanta marble balustrade

The surfaces of the arches are decorated with Renaissance ornaments; on the intrados of the outer arch there is a meander, the archivolt of the inner arch is decorated with rich garlands of fruit and a mask, while the intrados of the inner arch has a central band of alternating rosettes and rectangles with grotesques, framed by two interlacement bands with six-pointed stars in the middle. The stucco Chigi coat-of-arms (quartered with the oak and the six mountain with the star) above the portal was added by Bernini in 1652. The inscription "Unum ex septem" on the cartouche hanging from the coat-of-arms indicates that this is one of the privileged altars which are devotionally equivalent to visiting the Seven Churches of Rome.

The entrance of the chapel is marked by a marble railing. It is made of a yellow giallo antico marble frame with dark red portasanta balusters. The railing was enlarged and the turgid balusters were added in the 17th century. This balustrade was copied by Giovanni Battista Contini in the Elci Chapel in Santa Sabina using a different colour scheme. The step leading into the chapel is a large monolith of Egyptian granite. All the other chapels in the basilica have simple white stone steps. Agostino Chigi paid 300 scudi for the large block of stone. The central panels of the wooden doors are decorated with a dense foliage of carved acanthus leaves.

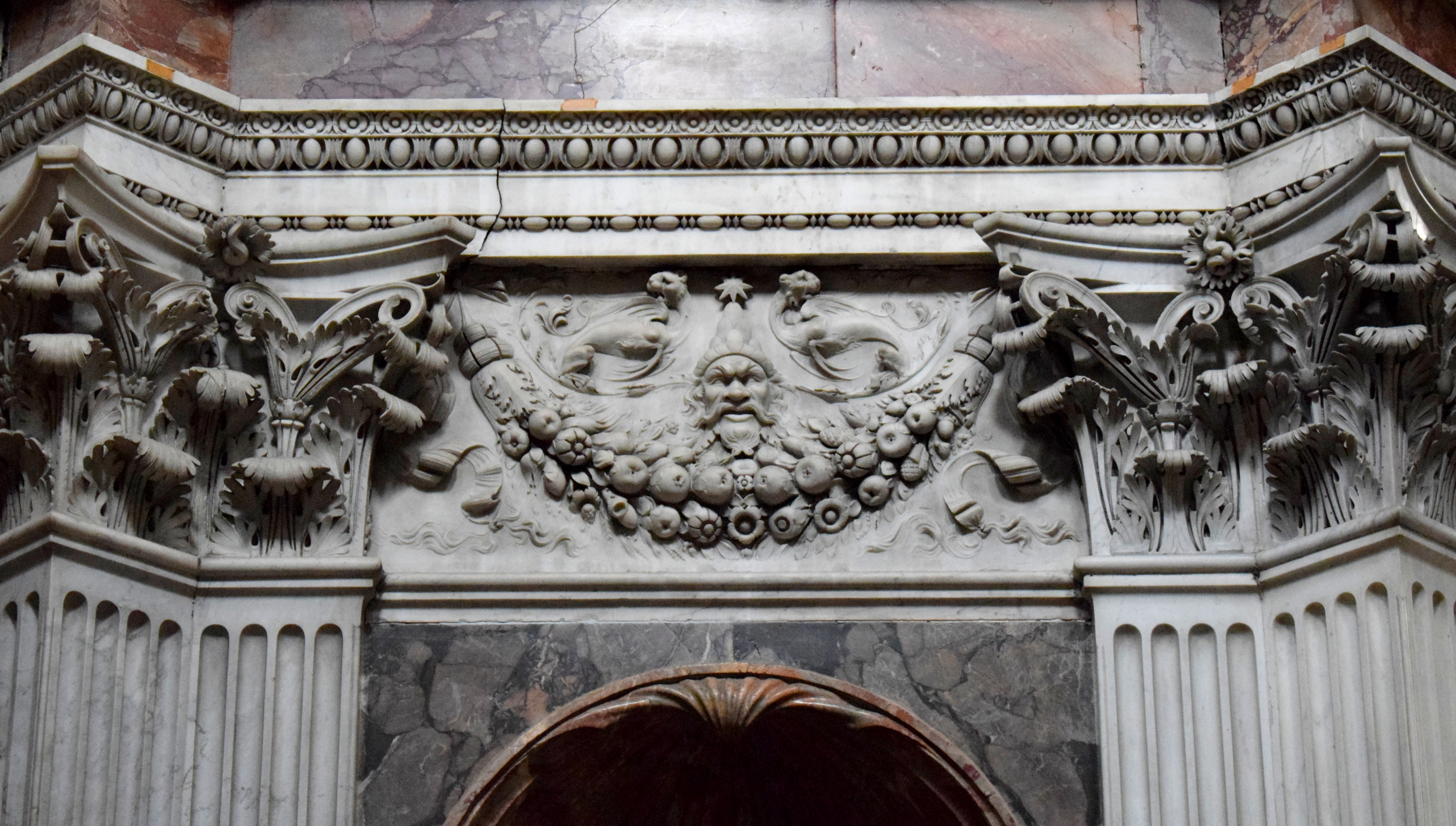
The panel with the male head.

The friezes in the chapel are "dropped" in an odd position between the capitals. This was an uncommon device and Raphael gave it an entirely new significance with the exuberance and plasticity of the carvings. There are similar dropped friezes on the Santa Casa in Loreto designed by Bramante in 1509. Shearman supposed that the design for the Chigi Chapel preceded the Santa Casa; at any rate the two project were related because the Chigi Chapel was dedicated to the Virgin of Loreto by Agostino Chigi. Dropped friezes appear on the two monumental tombs by Andrea Sansovino in the apse of the basilica which were also created in the first decade of the 16th century. The antique precedents are rare but the same arrangement is visible on the Arcus Argentariorum in Rome.

The friezes are embellished with festoons of fruit and ribbons. The decoration was modelled after the relief panels in the entrance bay of the Pantheon that Raphael recorded on a smaller drawing but he omitted the tripods on the sides because the available space was smaller. Raphael also added new symbols above the festoons: ascending eagles (at the sides of the altar), a bearded male head wearing a hat in the form of the Chigi symbols with two fantastic beasts (right to the entrance), a siren attended by winged sealions (left to the entrance) and the Chigi symbol of the mountain and the eight-pointed star (under the entrance arch). There are playful details: flowers and berries at the end of the ribbons, birds pecking the fruits of the festoons (both eagle panels) and a small scene of a bird attacking a lizard which is nibbling the fruits (left eagle panel).

There is a circular crypt under the chapel with an unornamented, empty pyramidal tomb set in the wall right under the altar which was discovered in 1974. At present this hypogeum is totally hidden from view but before Bernini's reconstruction there was an aperture in front of the altar creating a visual link between the two levels.

Dome

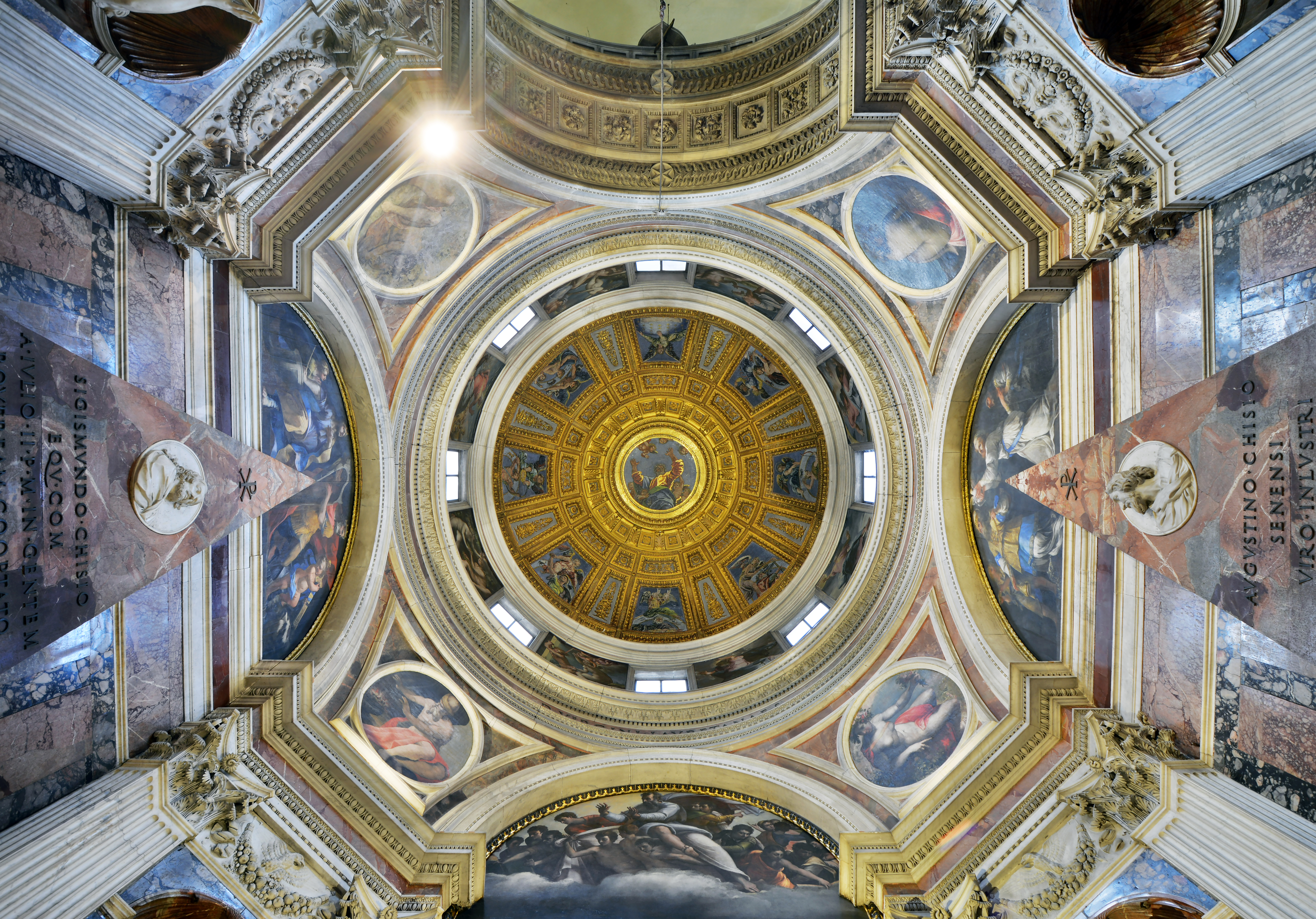
The dome with the mosaics of Raphael.

The dome is decorated with mosaics executed by the Venetian Luigi da Pace after Raphael's cartoon (1516). The original cartoons were lost but some preparatory drawings, that confirm the originality of the work, survived in the Ashmolean Museum, Oxford and Lille. The central roundel represents God, the Father, surrounded by putti, effectively foreshortened in an impetuous gesture, harking back to Michelangelo, which seems to give rise to the entire motion of the universe below. Eight mosaic panels show the Sun, the Moon, the starry sky and the six known planets as pagan deities depicted in half-length, each accompanied by an angel with colourful feathered wings. The figures are accompanied by the signs of the zodiac.

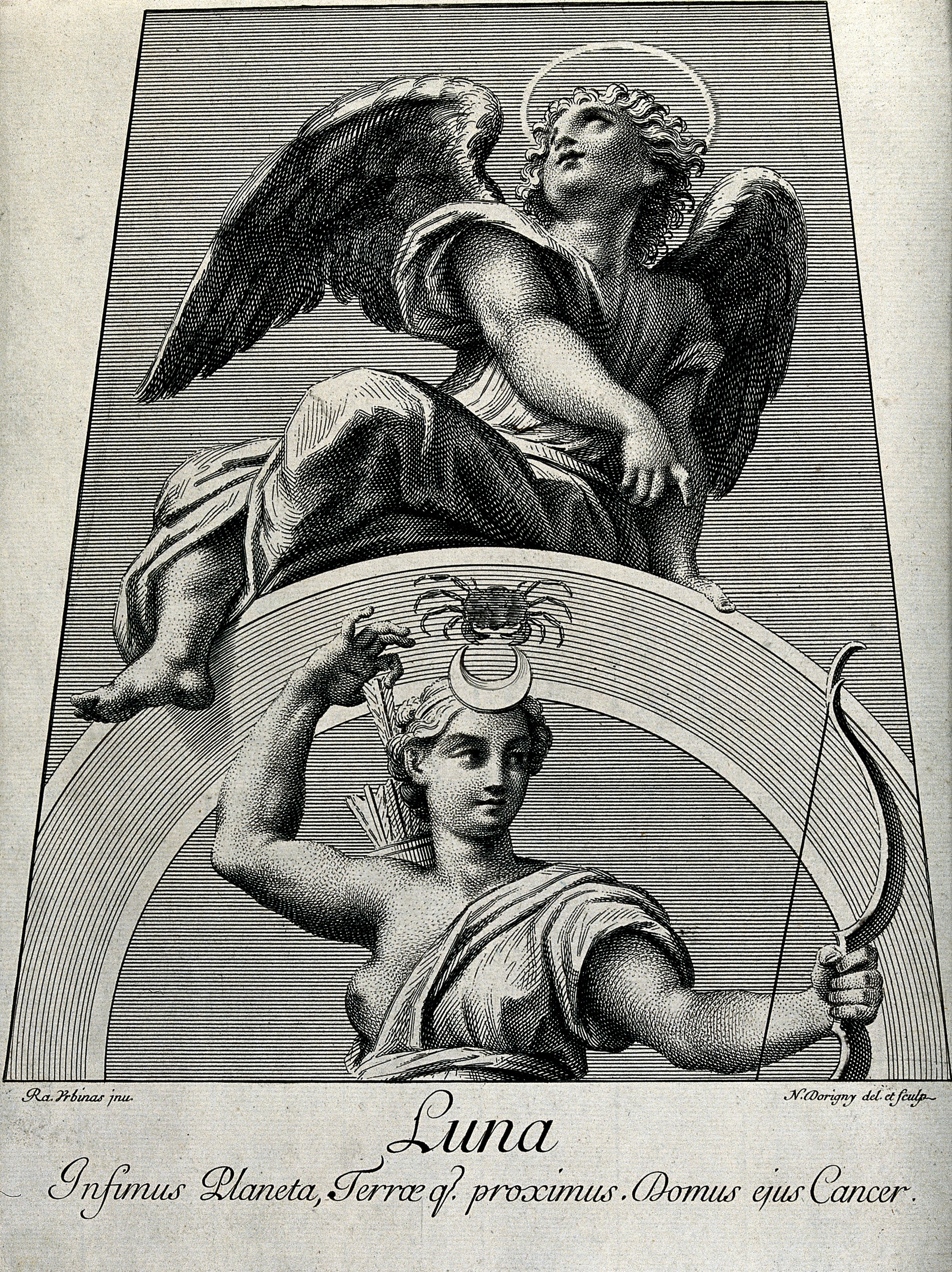
Luna, engraving of a mosaic panel by Nicolas Dorigny.

The sequence of the panels is as follows: the sky; Mercury, the god holding the caduceus (with Virgo and Gemini); Luna, the crescent moon jewelled goddess holding a bow (with Cancer); Saturn, the bearded god holding the scythe (with Aquarius and Capricorn); Jupiter, the king of the gods with his eagle holding a thunderbolt (with Sagittarius and Pisces); Mars, the god of war holding a sword and a shield (with Scorpio and Aries); Sol, the sun jewelled god holding a bow (with Leo); Venus, the goddess of love with Cupid holding a torch (with Taurus and Libra). A French engraver, Nicolas Dorigny created a series of plates depicting the mosaics in 1695 for Louis, Duke of Burgundy.

The mosaic panels are surrounded by richly gilded stucco decoration. The blue background creates an optical illusion giving the impression of an architectural framework opening to the sky above the chapel. The panels look like illusionistic skylights between the gilt stucco ribs while God is standing on the edge of the central oculus.

The traditional interpretation of the dome is that the composition shows the Creation of the World. Another interpretation, proposed by John Shearman, claims that it represents the cosmos as described by Plato in a Christianized Neoplatonist form. This idea had a widespread popularity in the Renaissance. In this case the dome is a depiction of the "Realm of the Soul after Death" with God, the Father receiving the soul (of Agostino Chigi) in his new home. The presence of the signs of the zodiac corroborates this interpretation because the signs were symbols of the passage of time in eternity, and they appeared in antique funeral art around the image of the departed.

Tambour and spandrels

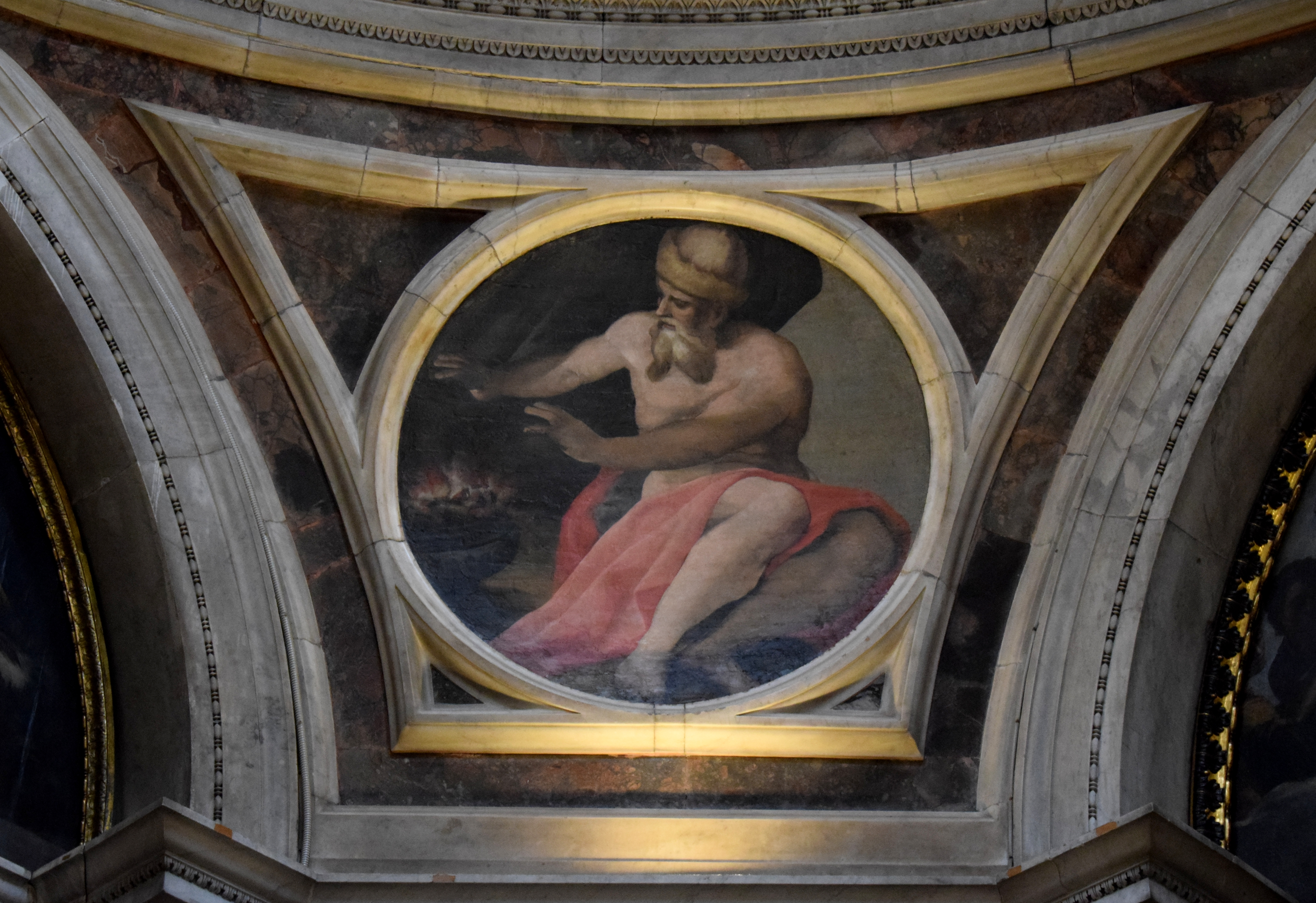
The personification of Winter

Raphael intended mosaics for the decoration of the tambour and the spandrels but these were never executed. In 1520 Francesca Ordeasca commissioned Luigi da Pace to carry out this task in no more than four years. In 1530 the executors of Agostino Chigi's will commissioned Sebastiano del Piombo to produce eight oil murals between the windows and four tondi on the spandrels. As Sebastiano was working leisurely on the large altar-piece, he made only preparatory drawings. Two studies in the Louvre show God the Father creating the Sun and the Moon and separating Light from Darkness. Another drawing in the Royal Library in Windsor shows God with arms outstretched, a gesture associated with creation. The drawings were obviously inspired by Michelangelo.

Around 1548-50 the Chigis commissioned Francesco de' Rossi (or Il Salviati) with the same task. Supposedly de' Rossi was recommended by his patron, Cardinal Giovanni Salviati (whose surname he adopted) because the cardinal was linked to the Chigi family through the 1530 marriage of his relative, Giuliano with Camilla Chigi, the daughter of Agostino.

The four tondi of the spandrels depict allegoric representations of the Seasons. In 1653 they were restored by Antonio della Cornia by order of Fabio Chigi. The murals were described as being seriously damaged in 1842. The iconography of the paintings is classical. Spring is represented as a young woman holding a bouquet of flowers with a floral wreath on her head; Summer is a woman holding ears of grain with a wreath of wheat on her head; Autumn is a young man under a grapevine with a cup; and Winter is an old man in a fur hat warming his hands by a brazier. A small ram by the shoulder of Spring is a symbol of Aries, the first sign of the zodiac and connected to the vernal equinox. The portrayal of Ver (Spring), Aestas (Summer) and Autumnus (Autumn) follows Ovid's description of the seasons in his Metamorphoses (Met 2.27-30) while the allegory of winter was inspired by the "February-by-the-fire" motif of medieval calendar tradition. The former three personifications can also be interpreted as ancient Roman deities: Flora/Proserpina, Ceres and Bacchus. The tondi were damaged in different degrees, the most seriously the allegory of Autumn. During a recent restoration the 17th-century bronze frames were removed.

The Genesis-cycle

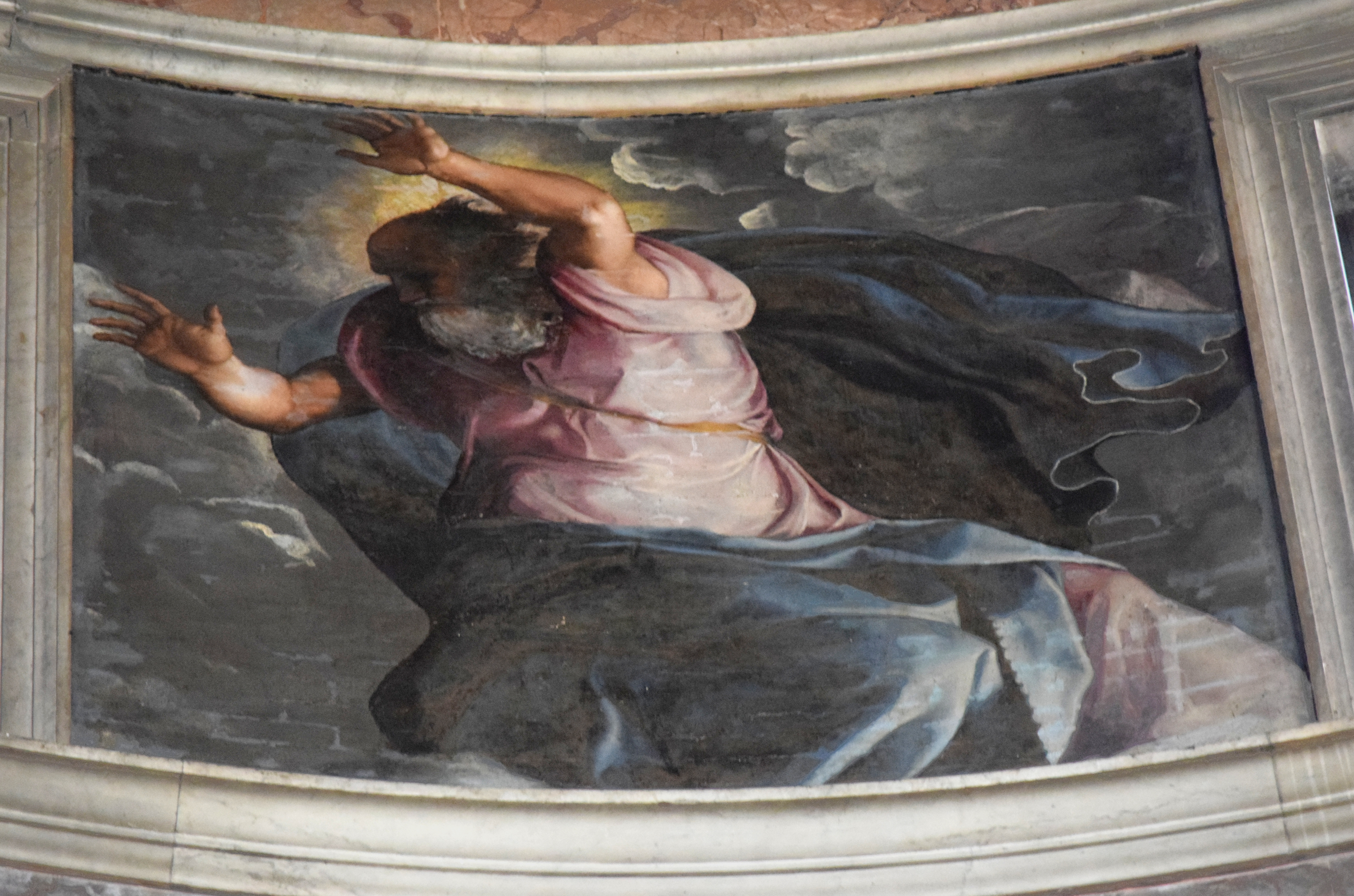

Separation of Light from Darkness

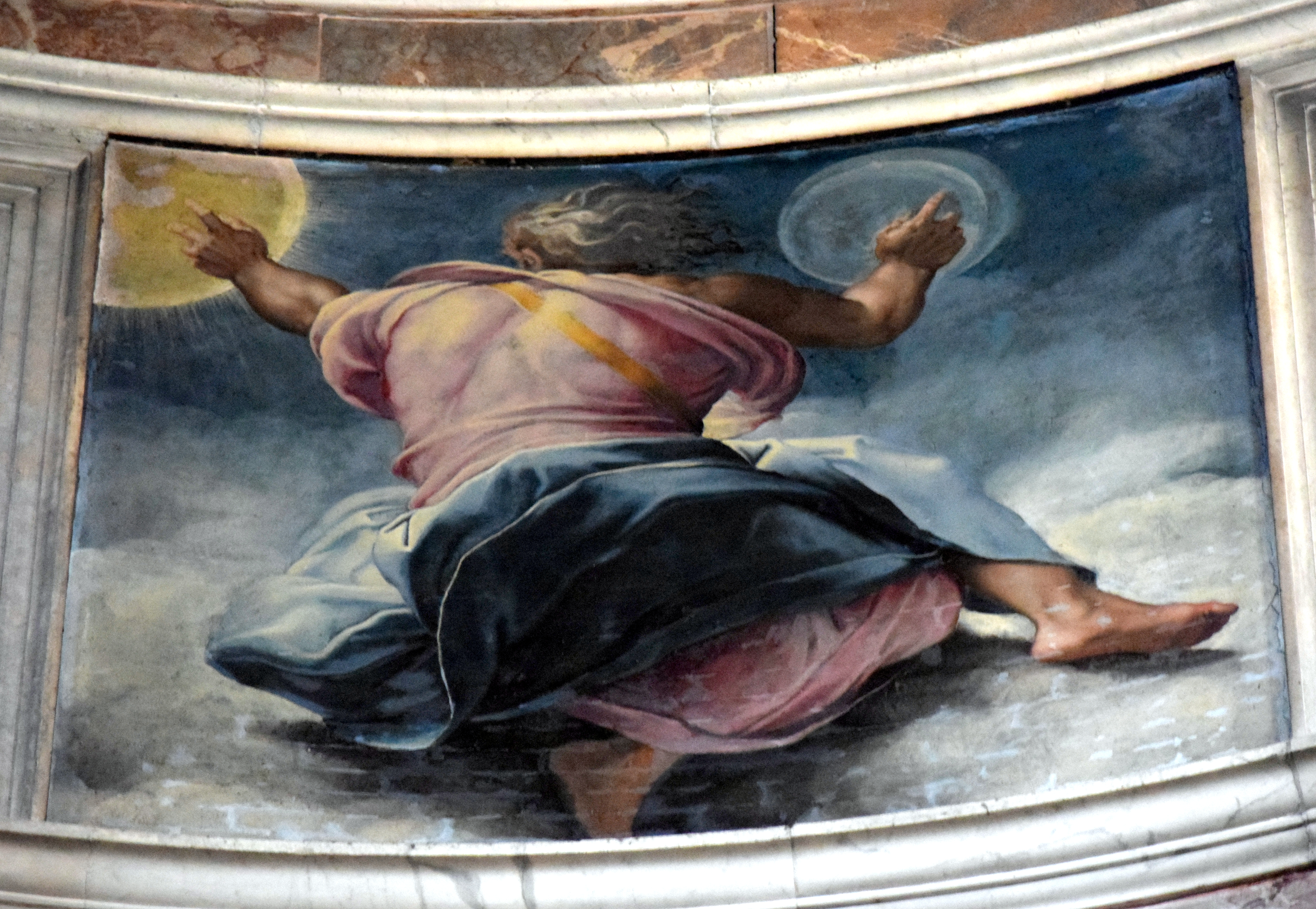

Creation of the Sun and the Moon

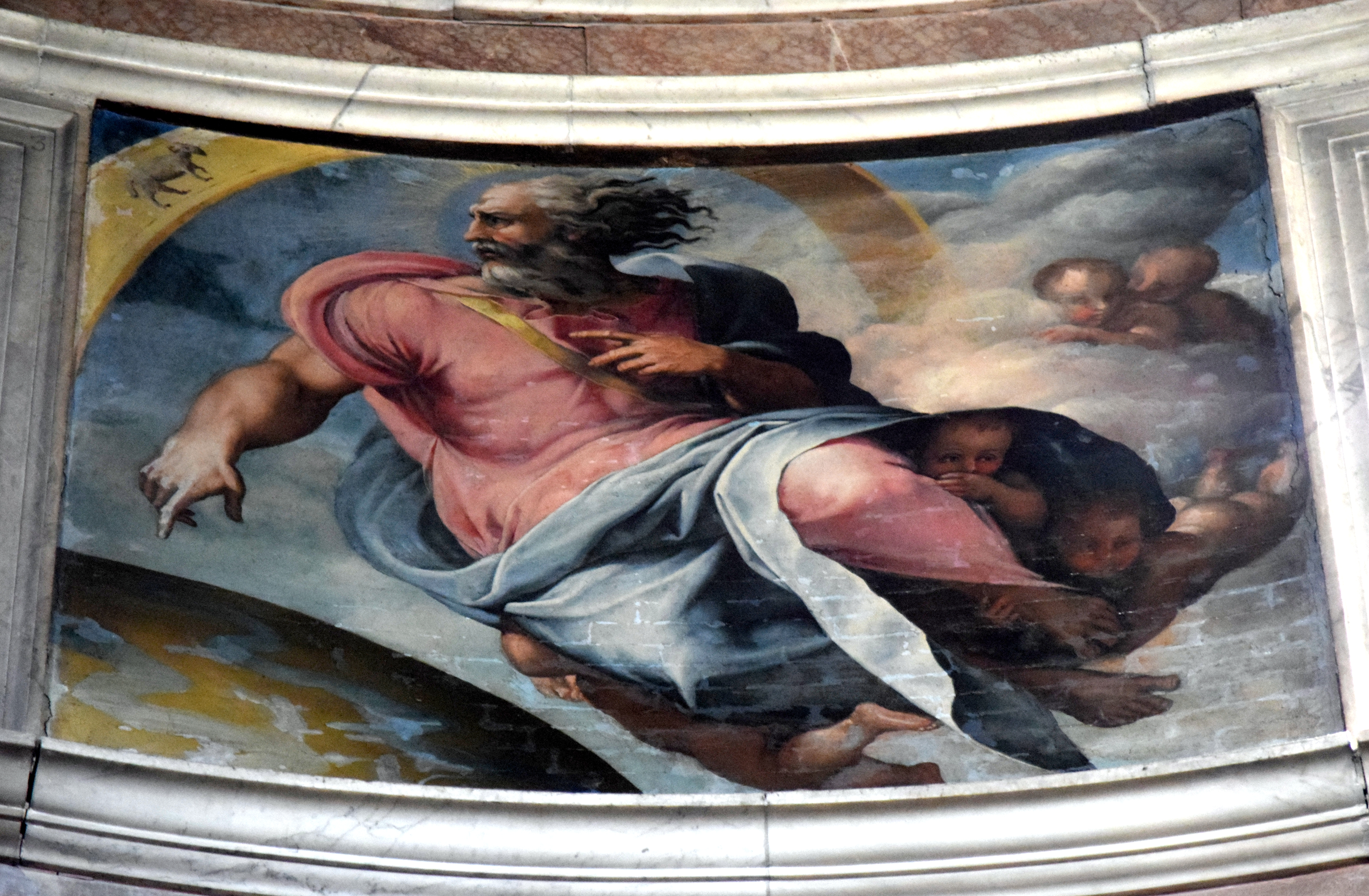

Creation of the Earth

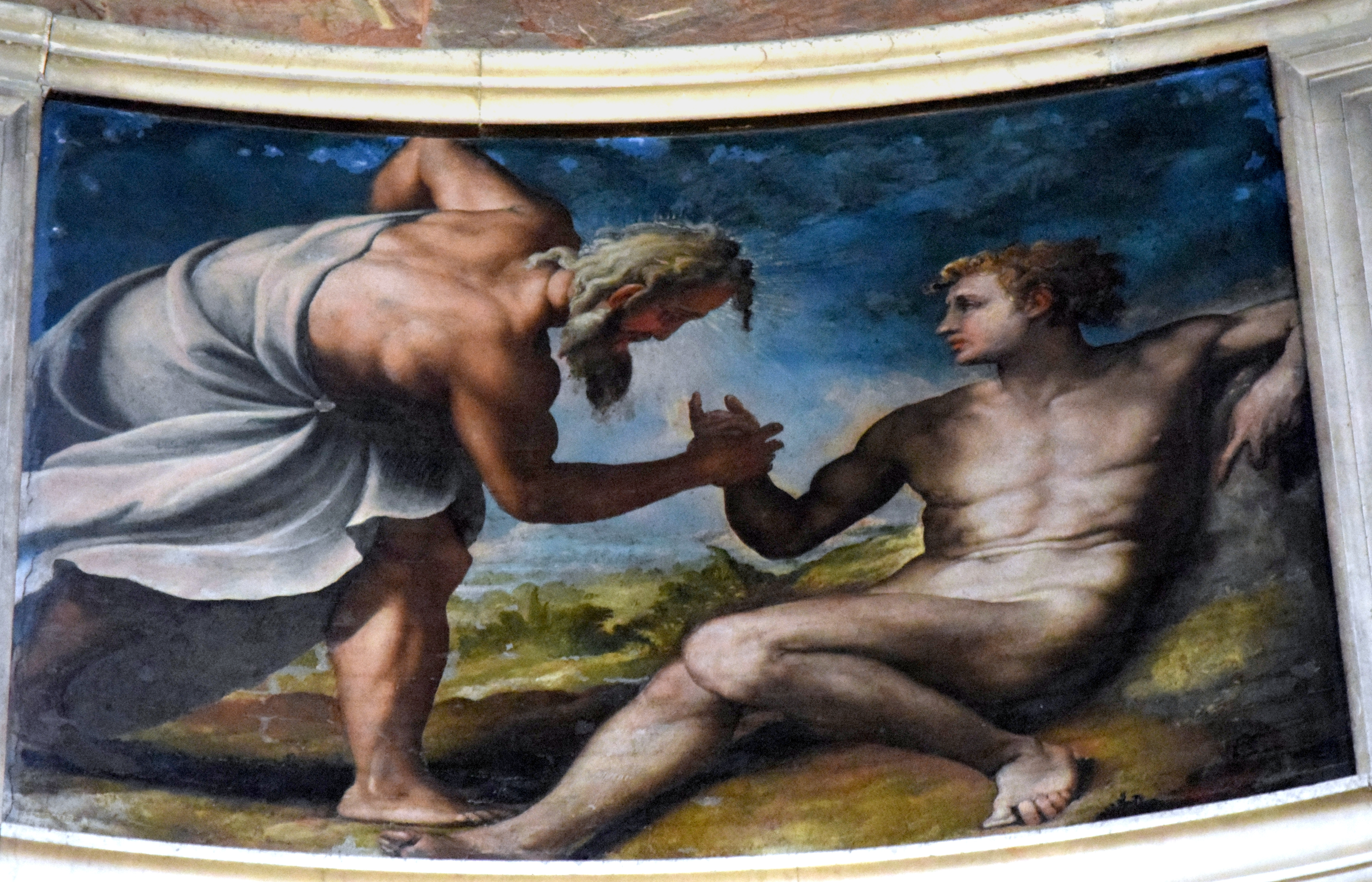

Creation of Adam

The frescos between the windows of the drum (c. 1552-1554) depict scenes from the Book of Genesis in order: Separation of Light from Darkness, Creation of the Sun and the Moon, Creation of the Earth, Creation of Adam, Creation of Eve, Creation of the Animals, The Original Sin and Expulsion from Paradise. The paintings show the strong influence of the sculptural style of Michelangelo's famous Genesis-cycle on the ceiling of the Sistine Chapel. The scenes are not in strictly chronological order. The first five are the same as the parallel Genesis paintings in the Sistine Chapel but the sixth fresco adds a new subject, the creation of the fishes, birds and wild animals. The sixth scene of the Sistine ceiling is separated into two individual paintings on the drum of the Chigi Chapel. Salviati's cycle ends here, and the three scenes from the story of Noah, that make up the last section of Michelangelo's great sequence, are missing.

Around 1602 Vincenzo I Gonzaga, the Duke of Mantua commissioned Pietro Facchetti to make copies of the Genesis frescos and the cosmological mosaics of the dome. The oil paintings were gifts to the Duke of Lerma, the most influential man in the court of Philip III of Spain, and they were brought to Valladolid in 1603 together with other copies of famous Italian artworks by Peter Paul Rubens, a young Flemish painter working for Duke Vincenzo at the time. The zodiac paintings later went to decorate the Planetary Hall of Philip IV of Spain in the Buen Retiro Palace. At present seven of the zodiac paintings and five surviving copies of the Genesis frescos are located in the Museo del Prado.

Due to their location and bad visibility the Salviati frescos have always been somewhat overlooked but the copies sent for the Duke of Lerma prove that they were held in high esteem at the time. This fact is corroborated by the 1725 guide of Roma sacra e moderna.

The Genesis-cycle

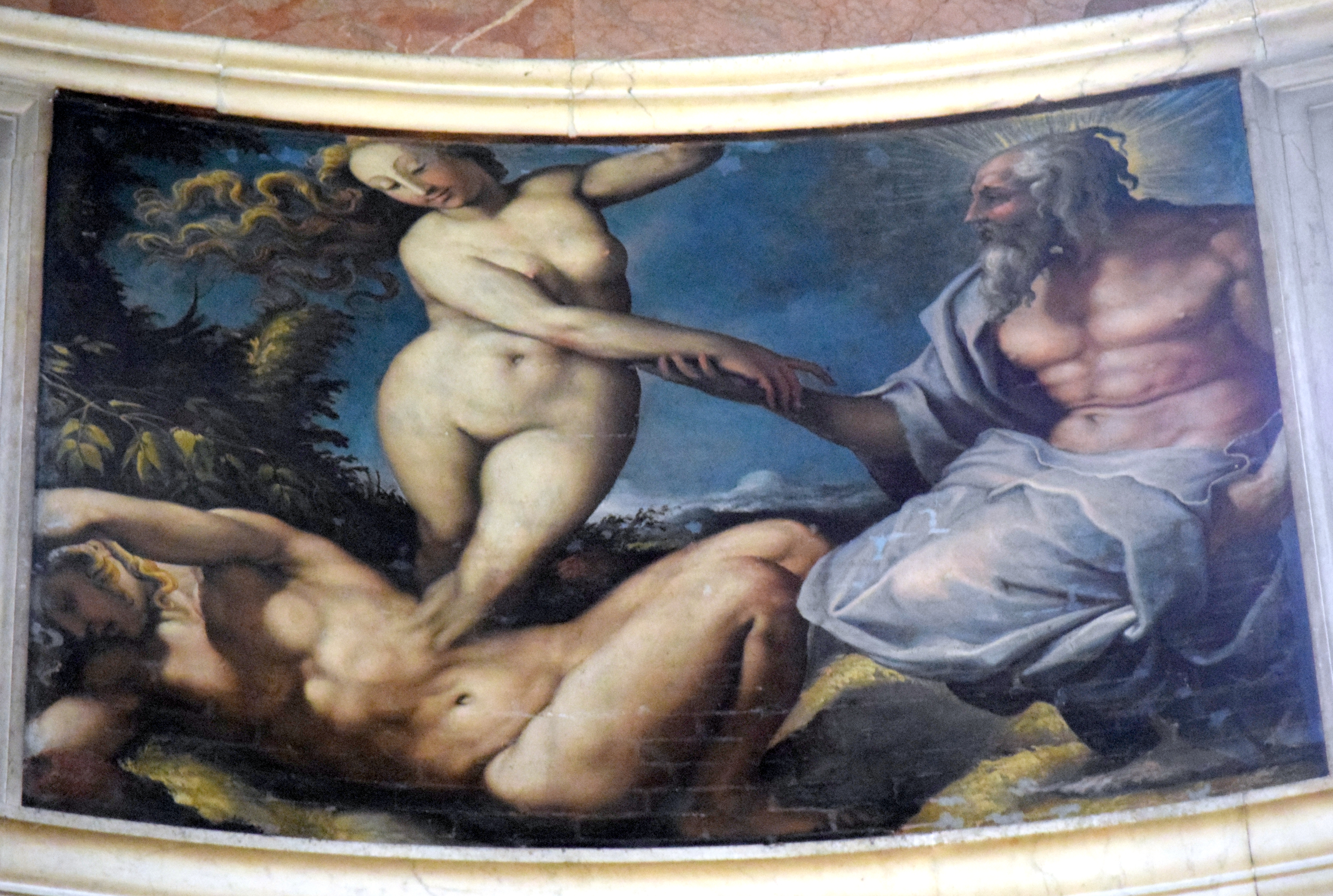

Creation of Eve

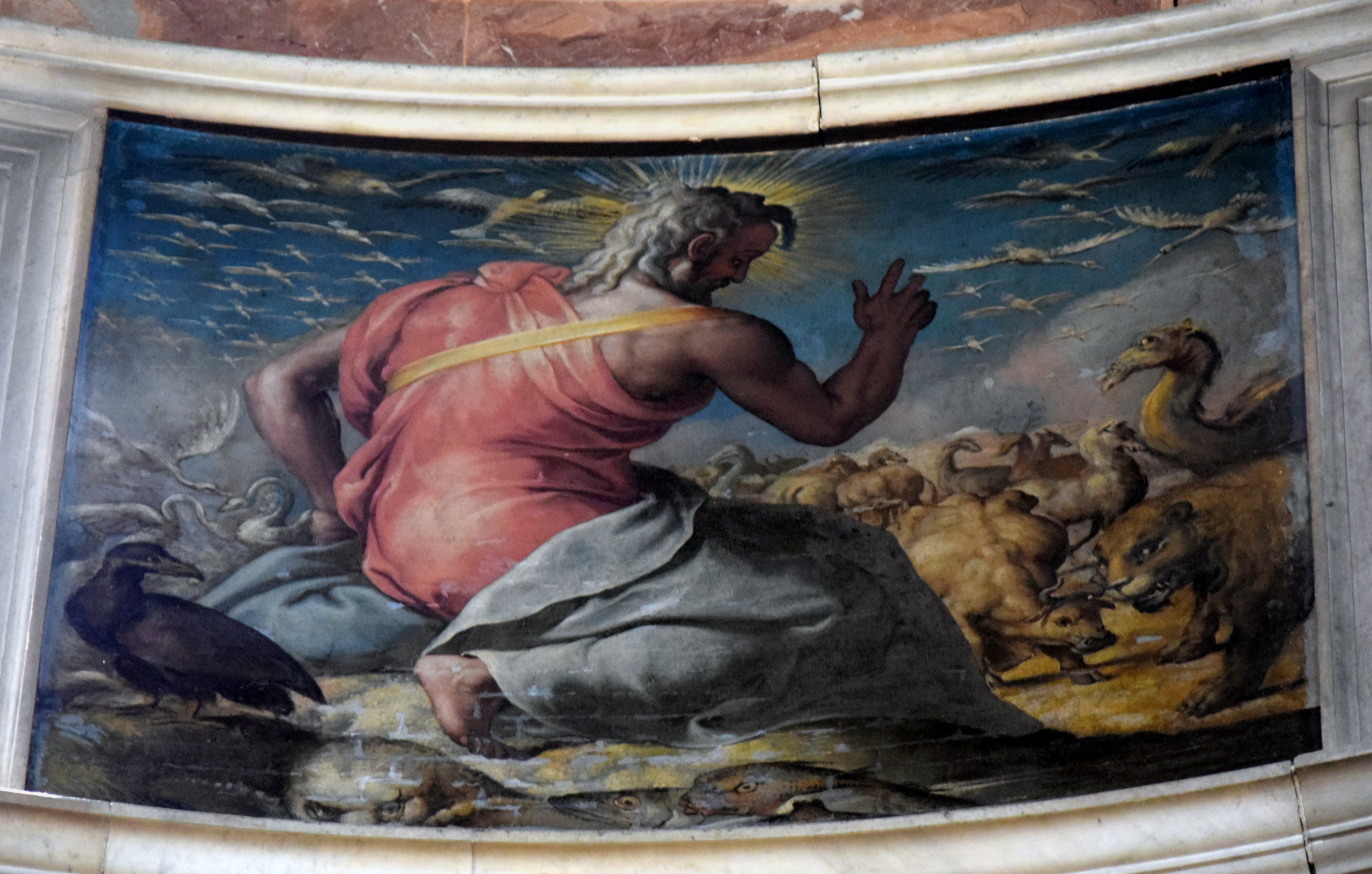

Creation of the Animals

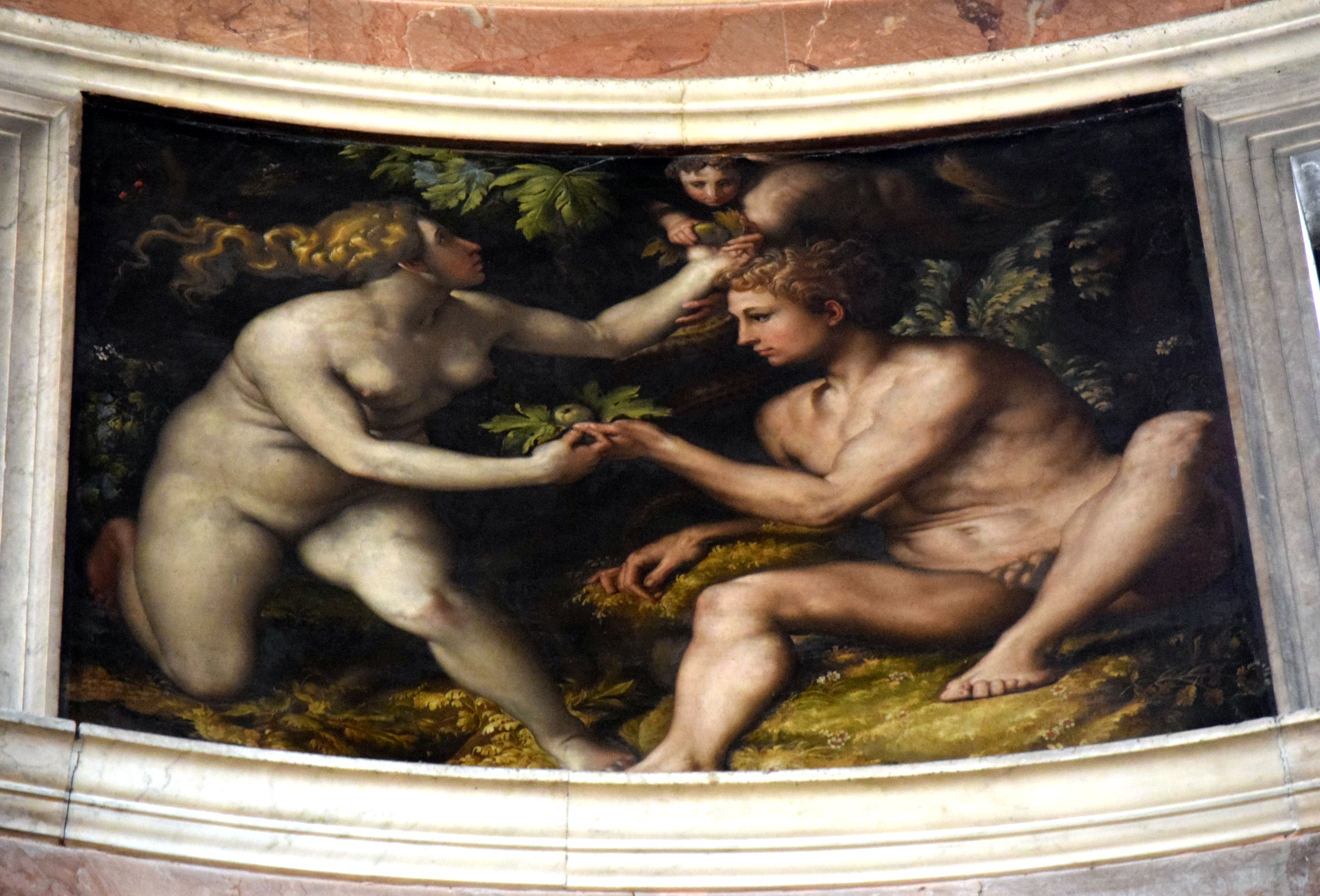

The Original Sin

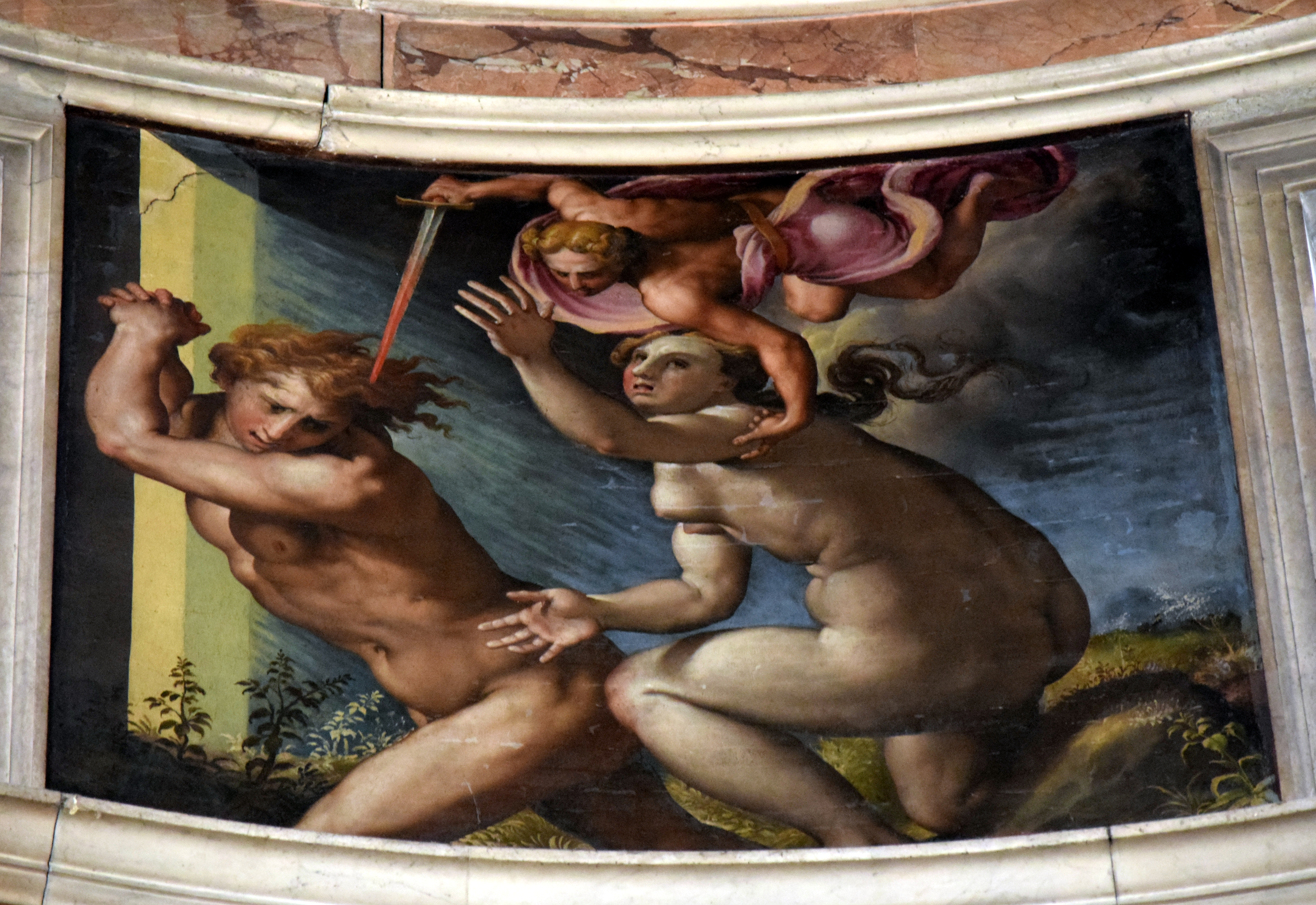

Expulsion from Paradise

"The architectural circularity of the tambour is evidently suitable for the narration of the story about the creation of the world in six days. The scenes require the viewer to move his gaze along the wall of the drum, and it is only at the end of this visual journey that he has reconstructed the story in its entirety", claims Florian Métral. The windows also play their part in the overall effect because the sunlight breaks through each of the bays in turn, illuminating certain scenes and making others indiscernible, thus modulating the viewer's visual experience over time.

The scene of the Creation of the Animals poses an interesting problem due to its placement after the creation of Adam and Eve which is not consistent with the Biblical narrative and has no iconographic precedent. (The aquatic and flying animals were created by God on the fifth day while the terrestrial species had been created on the sixth day but before the first man.) Salviati "postponed" this scene in order to place the Creation of Adam and the Creation of Eve on both sides of the entrance to the chapel and to have them face directly the Nativity of the Virgin on the altar because this arrangement was more meaningful theologically. A subtle reference that the scene belongs to the first group could be seen in the treatment of God's clothing (red and blue mantle in the first scenes but a different bluish-white robe in the Creation of Adam and Eve). Looking at the whole cycle the scenes are gradually getting darker as the narrative progresses, except the oddly positioned Creation of the Animals which belongs to the first group of paintings regarding its treatment of light.

According to Métral the frescos of the tambour represent the creation of the terrestrial and visible world, subject to time (tempus), which is marked by mutability and corruptibility in contrast with the perfect and eternal world of heaven represented by the mosaics of the dome above.

Sebastiano del Piombo: Birth of the Virgin

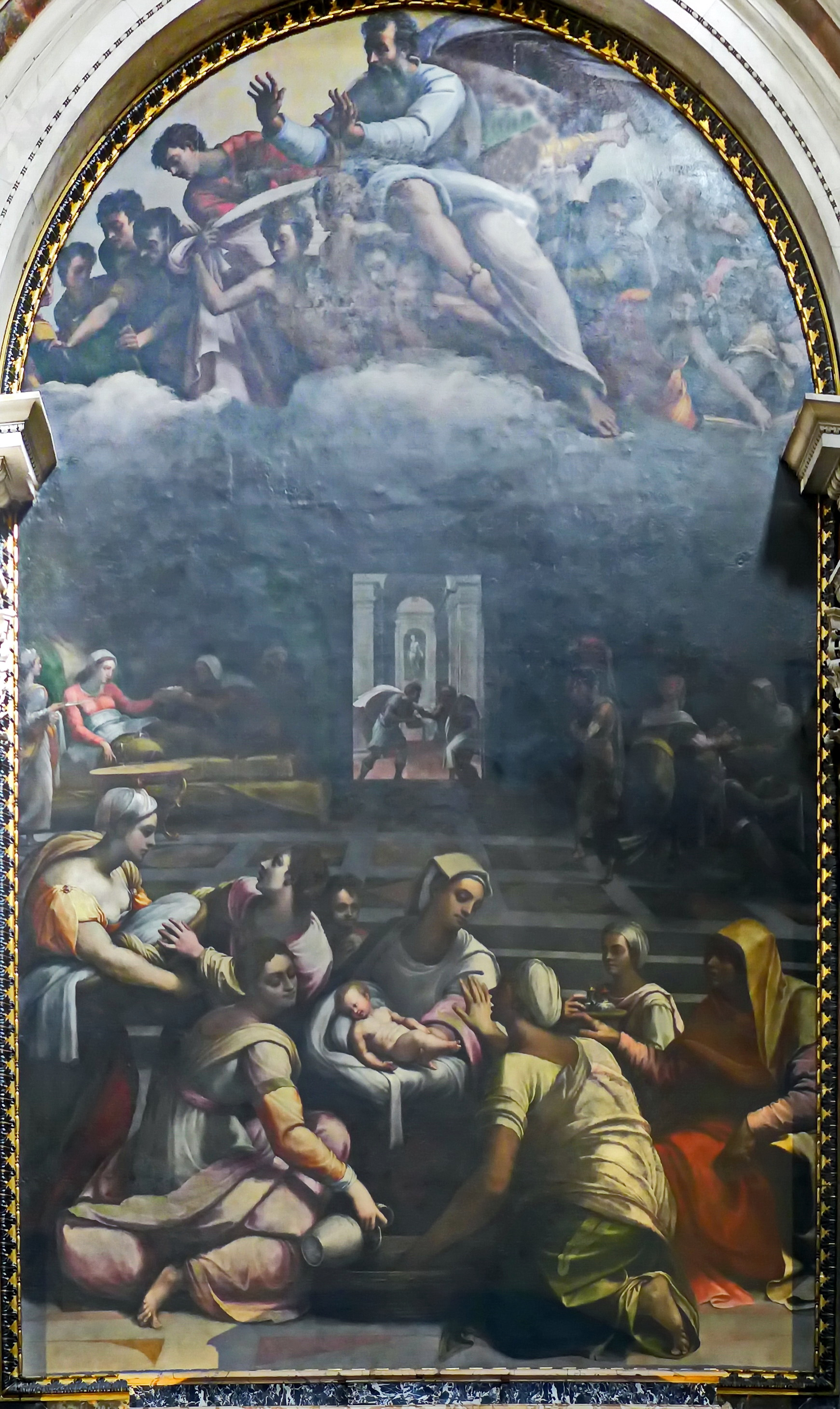
The Birth of the Virgin by Sebastiano del Piombo

John Shearman proposed that the main altar-piece was intended to be an Assumption of the Virgin but the theory remains heavily disputed. Soon after Raphael died, Sebastiano del Piombo was chosen to carry on the work on the altar-piece but he achieved less than expected. Vasari gives a scathing account in his Lives:

"He did little work there, although we find that he obtained from the liberality of Agostino and his heirs much more than would have been due to him even if he had finished it completely, which he did not do, either because he was weary of the labors of art, or because he was too much wrapped up in comforts and pleasures."

During this decade Sebastiano may have produced several drafts to the patrons. Two of them survived: an earlier preparatory study in the Kupferstichkabinett Berlin and a finely executed, definitive modello drawing in the Louvre. The main difference is that the group in the upper part of the painting (God and angels) is missing on the earlier Berlin drawing. The composition of the modello, which is identical to the executed mural, became more mature and harmonious. (Another study, a small drawing of a female head, was acquired by the Louvre in 2004.) On 1 August 1530 Filippo Sergardi, who was guardian to the heirs of Agostino Chigi, signed a new contract with Sebastiano accepting the final version. In this document the artist was entrusted to paint the altar-piece and the other murals in the next three years for a compensation of 1500 plus 1300 gold ducats.

The Birth of the Virgin was eventually begun by Sebastiano del Piombo using an unusual technique, oil on peperino stone blocks. This was invented by him and greatly admired by his contemporaries. The mural was left unfinished by Sebastiano in 1534 and it was completed by Francesco Salviati by 1554. The upper part with the figure of the Holy Father and the angels is mainly Salviati's work.

The iconography of the painting is rather unusual. According to Costanza Barbieri the presence of God in the upper part combines the traditional subject of the nativity with the doctrine of the Immaculate Conception which was still not generally accepted but it was heavily promoted by Pope Sixtus IV, and by Agostini Chigi, who requested in his will the celebration of a solemn mass in his chapel on the day of the birth of the Virgin. The theological stance of sine culpa was also shared by the Augustinian friars of Santa Maria del Popolo. The idea that Mary, mother of Jesus can be stained by the original sin is abhorrent for God, the Father who averts this risk with his strong gesture even before Mary is conceived. The angels surrounding the Holy Father are angeli apteri, angels without wings, young men after the fashion of Michelangelo. They are intently browsing voluminous codices turning to the right and the left, an appropriate visualization of the sapiential books; the same motif appears on a modello drawing by Sebastiano for an altar-piece depicting the Assumption in the Rijksmuseum.

In the lower part of the painting the newborn baby is prepared for her first bath by seven female servants. The woman holding the baby in the middle bears some deceptive - and probably intentional - resemblance to a Madonna. Saint Anne, who just gave birth to her daughter, is resting on the bed in the middle of the gloomy room which opens towards a courtyard. In the strongly lit rectangle of the doorway her husband, Joachim is greeted by a man. At the far end of the rather monumental courtyard a classical statue is visible, probably representing the Tiburtine Sibyl who prophesied the birth of Christ to Augustus.

The ornate gilded bronze frame of the painting with acanthus leaves and acorns was made by Francuccio Francucci in 1655. Similar frames surround the lunette panels of Raffaello Vanni above the tombs.

Christ and the Samaritan Woman

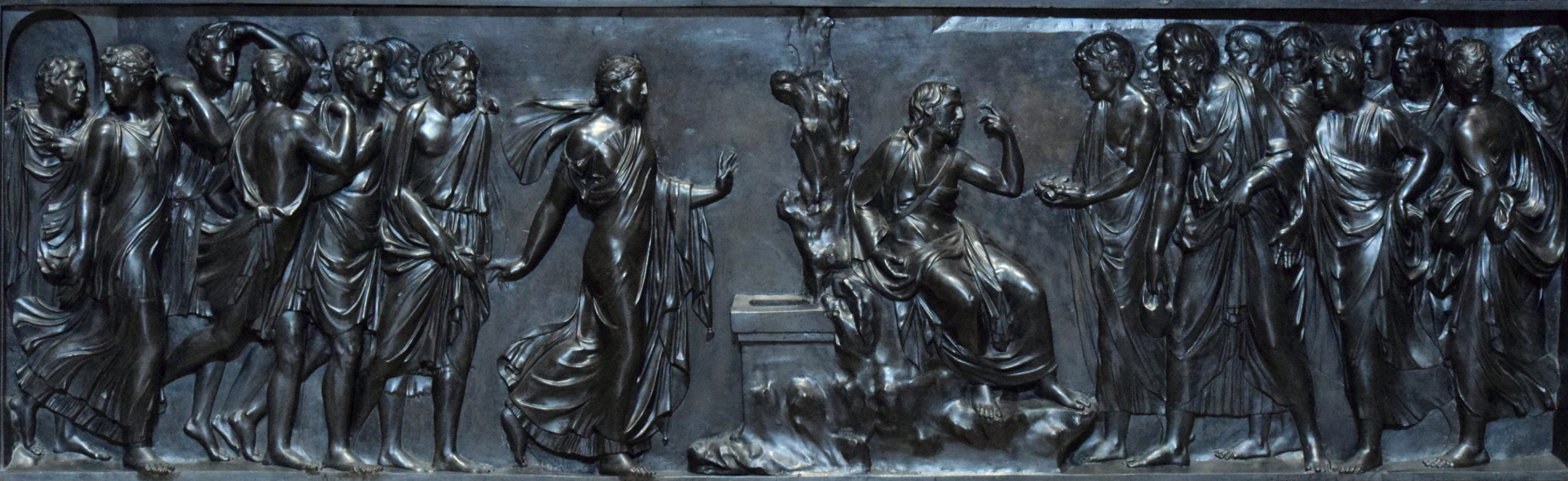
Christ and the Samaritan Woman, bronze relief antependium by Lorenzetto

The bronze bas-relief panel on the altar front is Christ and the Samaritan Woman, by Lorenzetto. The relief was made in the early 1520s and bought by Lorenzo Chigi from the heirs of the sculptor in 1552. According to Antonio Pinelli it was originally planned for the tomb of Francesca Ordeasca, the wife of Agostino Chigi. If true, then this offers an explanation for the unusual thematic choice that suits well to a female tomb but seems somewhat incongruous on the sepulchre of a man. Anyway it was placed on the only existing pyramid at the time, the tomb of Agostino Chigi, and later it was moved to the main altar by Bernini who set it into a luminous golden-yellow stone frame.

The relief depicts the meeting of Jesus and the Samaritan woman at Jacob's Well. The relevant part of the passage in the Gospel of John (John 4:10–26) is called the Water of Life Discourse, and Jesus' words make it clear why the imagery was appropriate on a tomb:

‘...those who drink of the water that I will give them will never be thirsty. The water that I will give will become in them a spring of water gushing up to eternal life.’

Lorenzetto chose to represent the second part of the episode. Jesus is sitting at the well under a tree, and the disciples are offering him food that they bought in the town nearby. On the left the Samaritan woman is guiding the inhabitants of Sychar towards the well to see the Messiah.

The figures, the Samaritan woman and the second woman on the left were copied from a famous antique marble relief called the "Borghese Dancers" that is now kept in the Louvre but originally it was in Rome, and was an important source of inspiration for the artistic circle around Raphael.

The four prophets

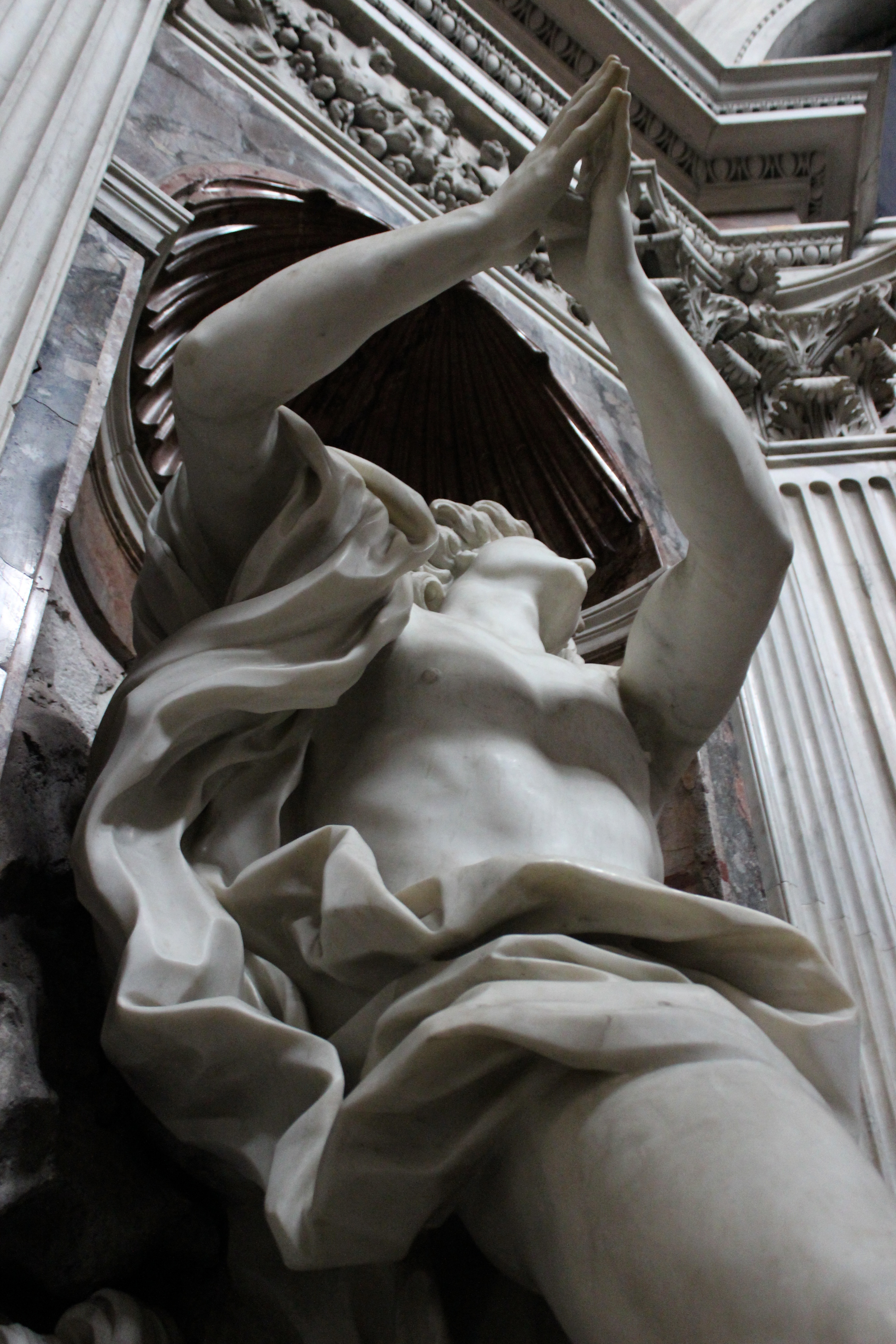
Part of the statue of Daniel by Bernini

The statues of the prophets standing in identical shell-headed niches in the four corners of the chapel belong to two distinct groups. The first two (Jonah and Elijah) were created by Lorenzetto following the designs of Raphael. These were left in the workshop of the sculptor until the Chigis bought them from Lorenzetto's heirs, and they were put up in the chapel in 1552. The latter two (Daniel and Habakkuk) were added by Bernini during the 17th century reconstruction.

There are differing theories on the arrangement of the niche figures in the original plans. Shearman assumed that the statue of Jonah was planned for the niche to the right of the altar because this place offered the best angle to view the composition. He thought that the statue of Elijah was most likely intended for one of the two niches by the entrance. After 1552 the two statues were supposedly placed on the two sides of the entrance. The present arrangement was created by Bernini who placed the statues of Habakkuk and Daniel diagonally facing each other creating a coherent composition.

The statue of Jonah and the whale, a prophet who prefigured the Resurrection, was carved by Lorenzetto (1520). The statue of Elijah, who lived by the grace of God in the desert, was created by Lorenzetto but it was finished by Raffaello da Montelupo around 1523/24.

In two other niches are sculptures by Bernini: Habakkuk and the Angel (1656–61) that took him by the hair and transported him to Babylon to succour Daniel and the Lion, who is represented in the corresponding niche on the opposite wall, sculpted by Bernini in 1655-56. With these two statues Bernini created a spatial relationship that enlivened the entire chapel, turning its classical form to a new religious use.

Pyramids

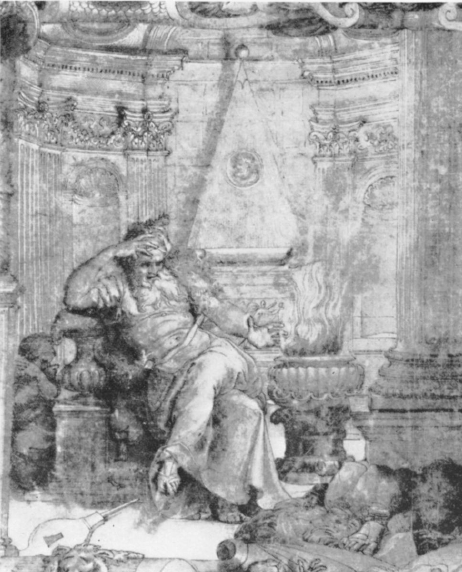
Salviati's drawing depicting Agostino's pyramid in its original or planned form.

On the side walls are the matching pyramidal wall tombs of Agostino Chigi (died 1520) and his brother Sigismondo (died 1526), each represented in a medallion, looking towards the altar. The monuments were probably designed by Raphael but their execution was left to Lorenzetto who nearly finished one tomb in 1522. As for the other pyramid, the evidences are inconclusive. The pentimenti at the marble cornices suggest that originally only one pyramid for the eastern side was envisaged. The first time when "sepulchres" are mentioned in plural form is in a contract between the Chigi family and Bernardino da Viterbo on 8 April 1522 when the sculptor was commissioned to add the final touches to Lorenzetto's work. Nonetheless the other pyramid was still recorded as mostly unbuilt in 1552 when the Chigis paid their long-standing debt towards Lorenzetto's family. (In the proceedings the base of the second pyramid and the slabs for the marble covering were also duly recorded.) Most probably the second monument was only erected by Fabio Chigi for his great-grandfather, Sigismondo.

In 1996 Antonio Pinelli discovered the original 1552 contract in the Getty Research Institute which had only been known through an inaccurate 19th-century transcription. He interpreted the text as a proof that the pyramid of Agostino was originally planned for his wife, Francesca Ordeasca together with the bronze relief of Christ and the Samaritan woman. This theory remains disputed but the corrected text indeed speaks about a female tondo which had not been executed by Lorenzetto - a hint that the second pyramid was prepared for a woman, most probably Ordeasca.

Pyramidal tombs were a new invention at the time but pyramids were the traditional symbols of eternity and immortality. The Chigi tombs were inspired by antique sources because they recalled the tombs of the pharaohs and two famous Roman funeral monuments, the pyramids of Cestius and Romulus, and due to their slender, elongated form (the ratio to height to width in Santa Maria del Popolo is 2:1), the ancient Egyptian obelisks embellishing the squares of the city. Obelisks were also associated with Roman imperial funerals because medieval tradition held that the bronze globe on top of the Vatican obelisk contained the ashes of Julius Caesar.

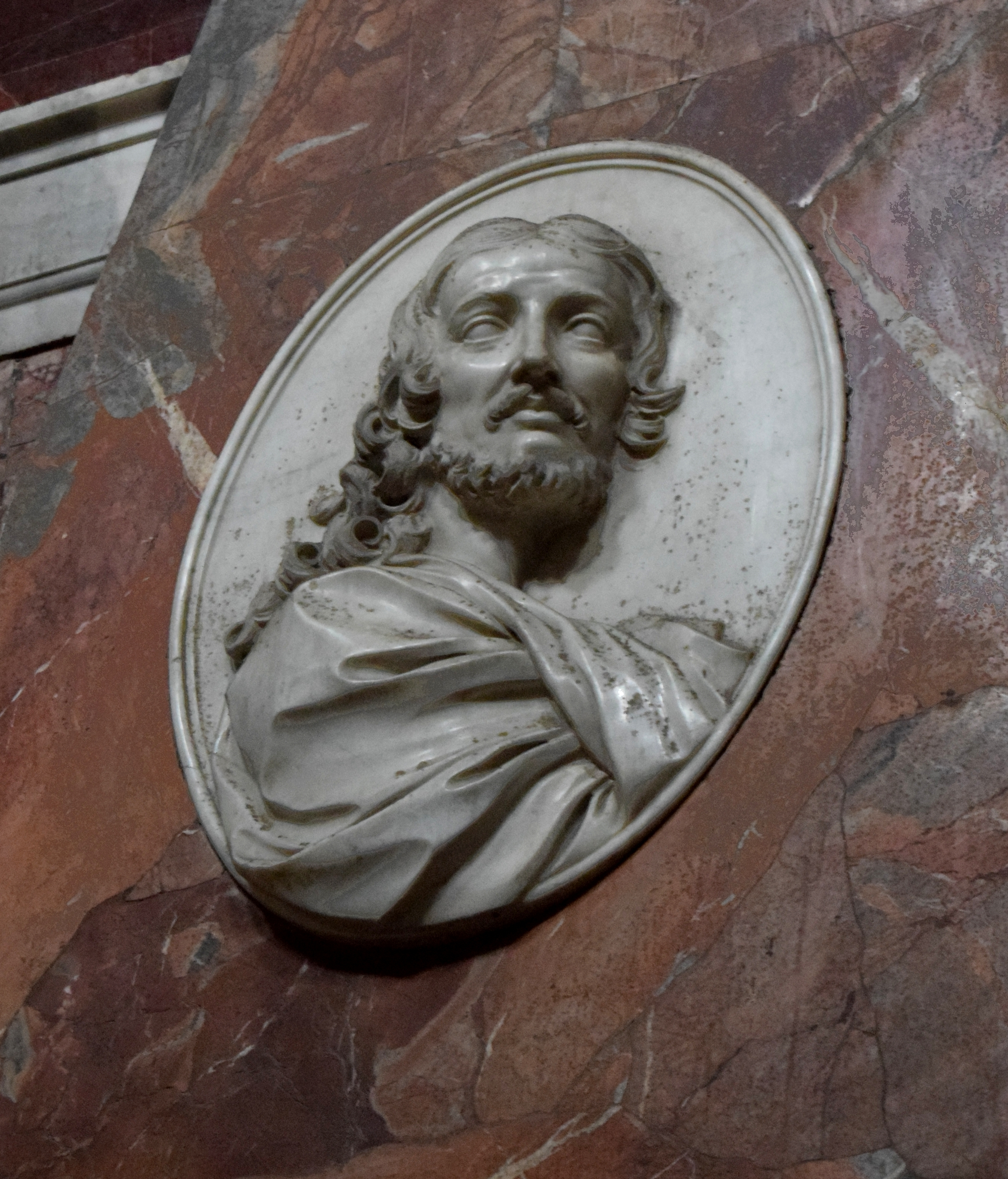
The portrait of Sigismondo Chigi by Bernini

During the Baroque reconstruction of the chapel, the tombs were finished and simplified by Bernini. Originally the medallions were probably made of bronze, the epitaphs were to be written on gilt copper plates, and three sides of the bases were to be decorated with bronze reliefs. A sketch attributed to Giovanni Antonio Dosio (c. 1570) in the Uffizi shows the original form of Agostino's pyramid with the plate and the medallion missing. Another drawing, an architectural phantasy with the figures of Pyramus and Thisbe by Jean Lemaire (c. 1650) shows a similar pyramid obviously inspired by the one in the Chigi Chapel before it was restored by Bernini. A modello drawing for a tapestry by Francesco Salviati (c. 1548) shows the same monument crowned with a cap and small bronze ball which were later removed (or never existed).

The pyramids are resting on four small supports of africano marble imitating the original astragals of the Vatican obelisk. It is unsure whether the present pedestals are the originals or they were replaced by Bernini. The 1552 contract speaks about seven "termini" executed by Lorenzetto that could refer to pedestals although the term is ambiguous.

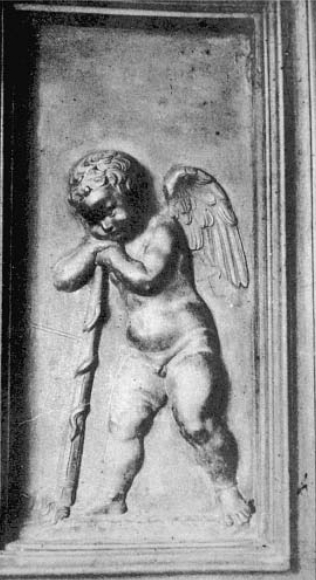
Mourning Genius by Lorenzetto (lost).

Bernini replaced the reliefs on the base with green verde antico marble panels framed by the original giallo antico mouldings. Only one relief survived, the above-mentioned Christ and the Samaritan Woman (now on the altar-front), which illustrated Christ's words on the water of eternal life. Fabio Chigi in his above-mentioned letter in 1626 mentioned another bronze relief on the short side of the base facing the entrance of the chapel. This was identified by Enzo Bentivoglio who discovered a photograph showing a panel with a Mourning Genius in the Chigi family collection. The artwork itself was apparently lost during the 20th century. The relief depicted a winged putto leaning on a turned-down torch with a sad expression. Obviously a similar relief was planned for the other short side facing the altar but this was never executed by Lorenzetto.

The new medallions were made of white marble by an assistant sculptor from Bernini's workshop, and instead of the planned copper plates the funerary inscriptions are composed of freestanding bronze letters. The outline of the two planned cartouches can be seen on both tombs, patched up by Bernini - this is a proof that the marble slabs covering the other pyramid were also cut in the 16th century. The epitaphs were composed with the help of Lucas Holstenius, an erudite humanist and senior custodian of the Vatican Library. The Chi Rho symbol was added to the top of the pyramids.

The tombs were covered with portasanta marble slabs whose red and grey colours suggested the combustion and smoke of ancient Roman imperial funerals, while the pyramidal form evoked the multistory imperial rogus or funeral pyre. These funerals were customarily held on the Campus Martius where the basilica was located, and an eagle was released from the pyre signifying the ascent of the soul to heaven. It is not coincidental that the frieze panels to the left and right of the altar are decorated with soaring eagles. Seen as a whole, this is another example where the erudite Classical symbolism of the chapel was integrated into a broader Christian resurrection imagery.

The wall behind the tombs is covered with an unusual marble panelling of portasanta rectangles and africano borders. This revetment is already visible on Salviati's drawing, proving that it was part of the original scheme of the chapel, but on the modello drawing the lunette is also covered with the same encrustation. Regardless of whether this was ever really completed, the simple white marble cornices above the tombs should be 17th-century additions. The frieze between the cornices is made of smooth, dark red rosso antico marble, while the older frieze in the rest of the chapel had been made of portasanta. The antique source of this peculiar raised block revetment, if there was any, remains unknown although some lost part of the interior revetment of the Pantheon is sometimes proposed.

Lunettes

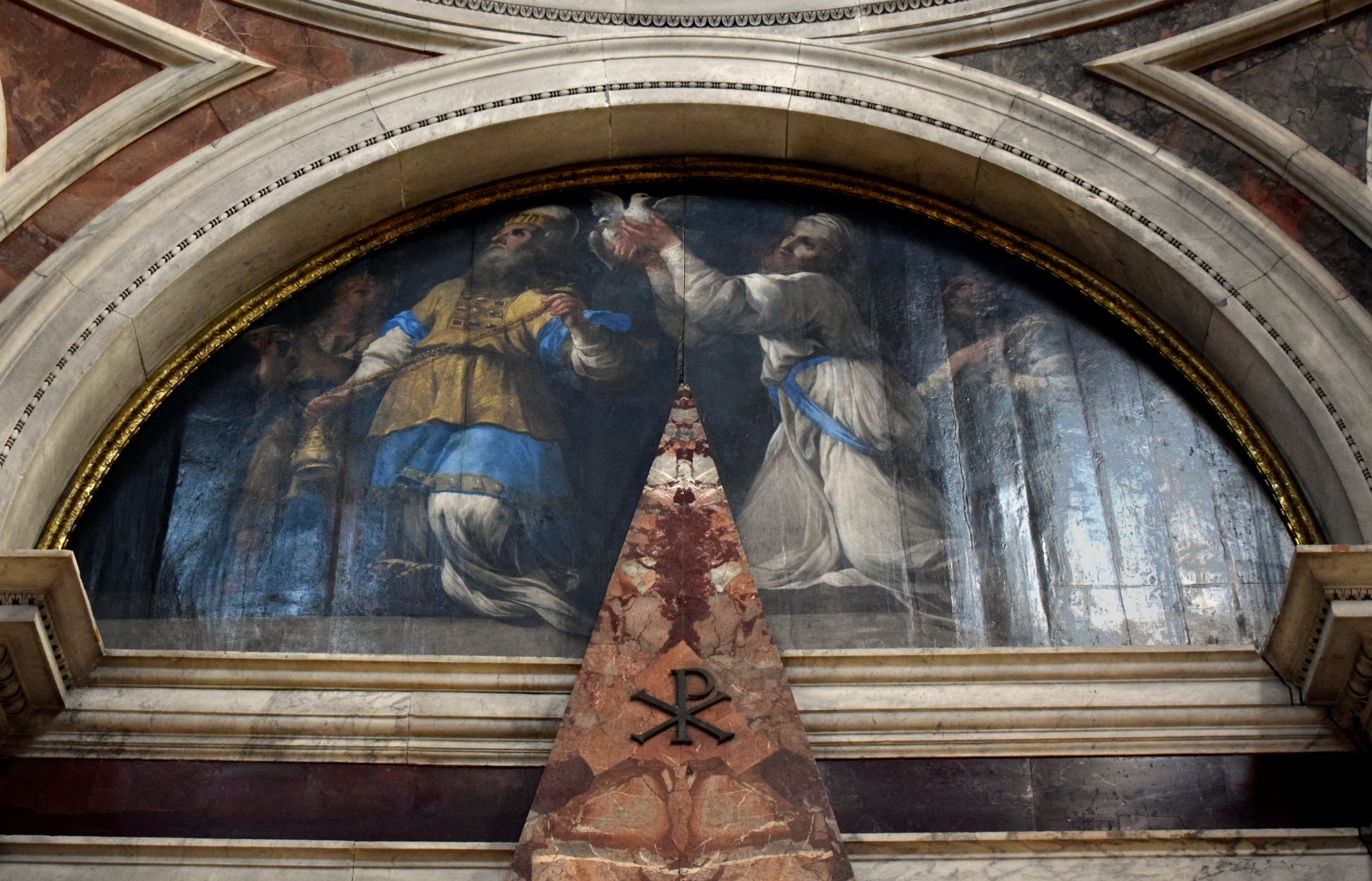
The sacerdotal ancestors of the Virgin by Raffaello Vanni

The lunettes are filled with oil on wood panels of Raffaello Vanni, commissioned by Fabio Chigi in 1653. The theme of these often overlooked paintings is somewhat enigmatic, giving rise to different interpretations. In the guides they are often described as "David and Saul" and "Eli and Samuel" or simply - and wrongly - as "prophets". The clue to their real meaning was given by a well-informed contemporary description which remained unpublished: Benedetto Mellini's Saggio della Roma Descritta which was written around 1656. Mellini states that the panel above Sigismondo's tomb represents The royal ancestors of the Virgin, while the other panel above Agostino's tomb shows The sacerdotal ancestors of the Virgin.

The royal ancestors are King David with the harp and Goliath's head, and a younger king, undoubtedly Solomon, the Temple Builder, kneeling and looking up at heaven. A boy holding a sword places his foot on the severed head triumphantly on the right, on the other side a child kneels with a circlet on his head, perhaps Solomon's young heir, Rehoboam. The sacerdotal ancestors are represented through a Jewish High Priest in traditional garb and his helpers offering doves and incense to God. The lunette paintings thematically complement Sebastiano del Piombo's altar-piece creating a link between the nativity of the Virgin and the stories of the Old Testament depicted on the tambour. During a 20th-century restoration the wall under the panels was exposed but no previous decoration was discovered. The semicircular wooden panels are set in a similar gilded bronze frame as the main altar-piece.

Pavement

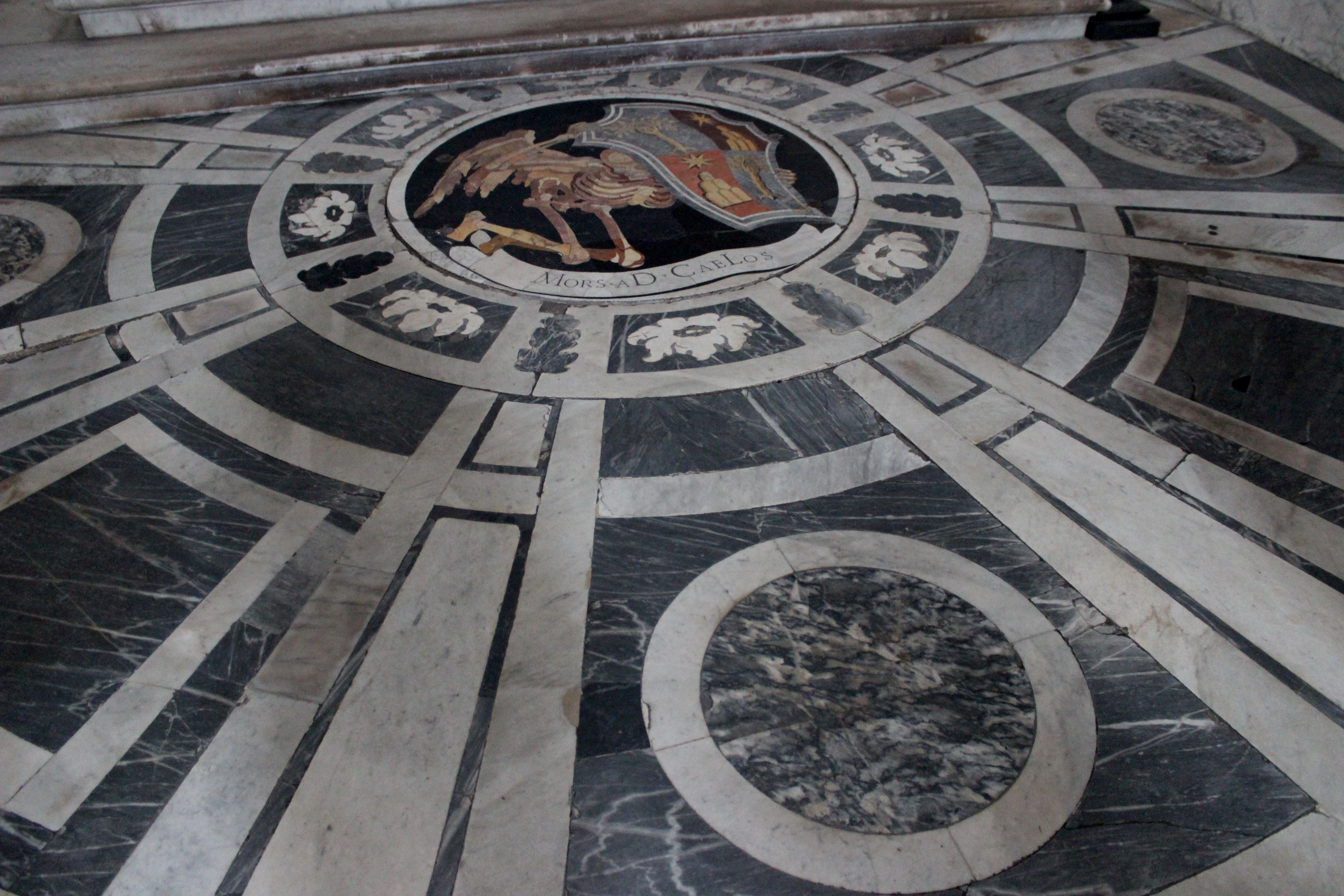
The geometric pavement by Bernini

The present pavement was designed by Bernini who walled in a preexisting opening in front of the altar and raised the altar by two steps emphasizing its symbolic importance (the third step is a later addition which disrupts the decorative pattern). The elegantly molded original steps were made of monolith blocks of statuario marble. The white and grey bardiglio marble pavement has a geometric pattern corresponding with the decoration of the dome. There is an inlaid opus sectile roundel at the center, surrounded by a frame of stylized roses and oak leaves. Inside the figure of a winged skeleton is lifting the coat-of-arms of the Chigi family symbolizing the triumph of dynastic virtue over death. There is a scroll with a Latin inscription under the figure: Mors aD CaeLos (meaning "through death to heaven"). The capital letters add up the date of the beginning of the reconstruction in Roman numerals: MDCL = 1650. The roundel was executed by stonecutter Gabriele Renzi in 1653/54. (Contemporary sources prove that the inscription was originally "Mors aD CaeLos Iter", the letters adding up to 1651, the year when Fabio Chigi returned to Rome on the last day of November after his long absence abroad.)

Furniture

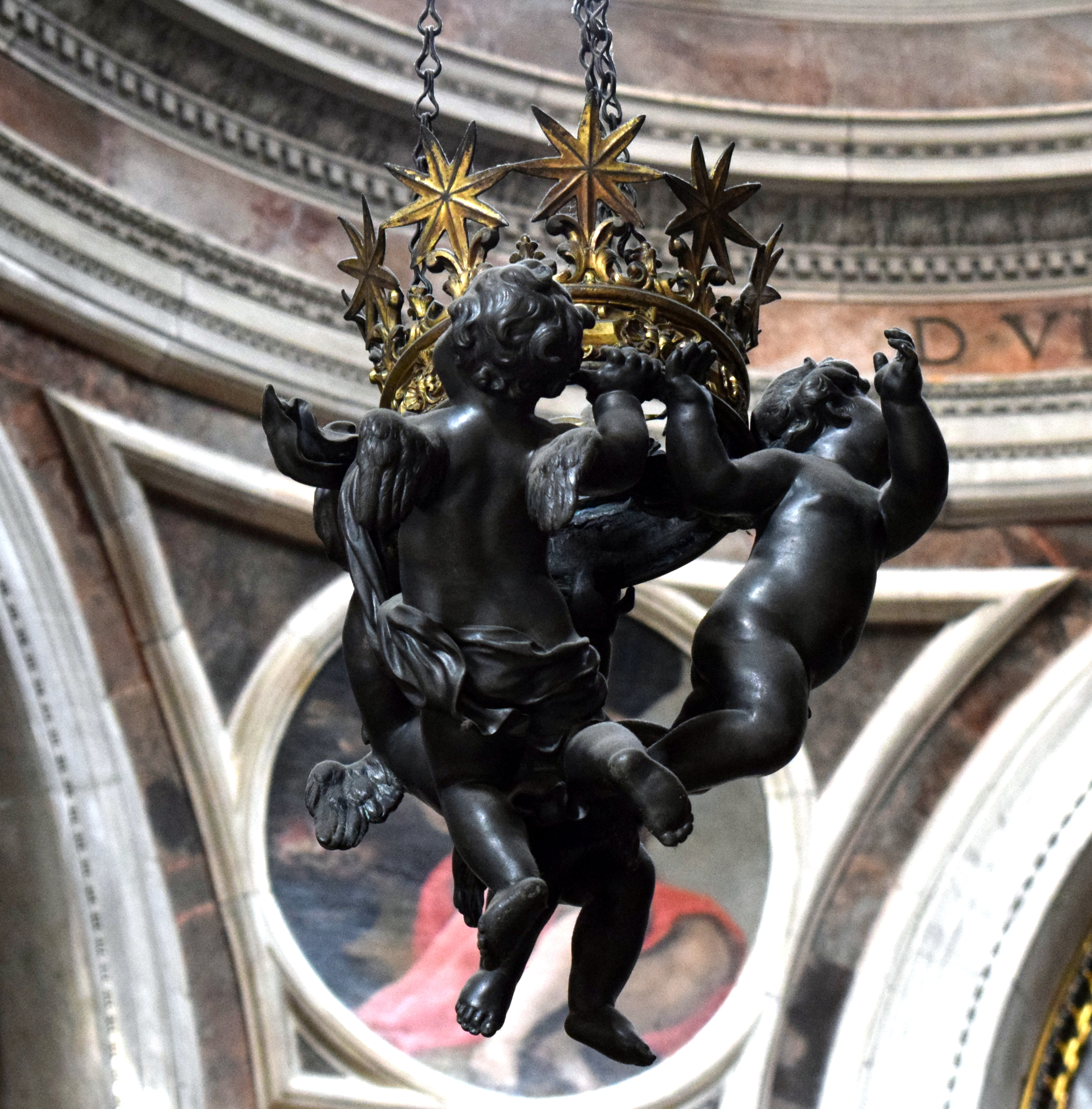
The bronze lamp which forms a Marian crown

At present there is almost no furniture in the chapel except an attractive bronze eternal lamp which forms a gilded crown hanging on chains, decorated with the eight-pointed stars of the Chigi and supported by three flying cherubs. The design is a symbolic reference to the crown of the Virgin, the patron of the chapel and the Chigi family. The lamp was designed by Bernini himself. In his diary the Pope confirmed the great sculptor's authorship: "Yesterday, we saw the bronze lamp made for the chapel in the Popolo by Bernini", he wrote on 16 July 1657. The lamp was modelled by Peter Verpoorten, a Flemish assistant of Bernini, cast by Francuccio Francucci and gilded by Francesco Perone. Filippo Baldinucci says in his Vita that Bernini "was accustomed to putting in no less study and application in designing an oil lamp than in designing a very noble edifice". A similar lamp was created for the Cybo Chapel in the basilica, a copy was made in 1885 for the Palazzo Chigi in Ariccia, and also other casts of the lamp are known.

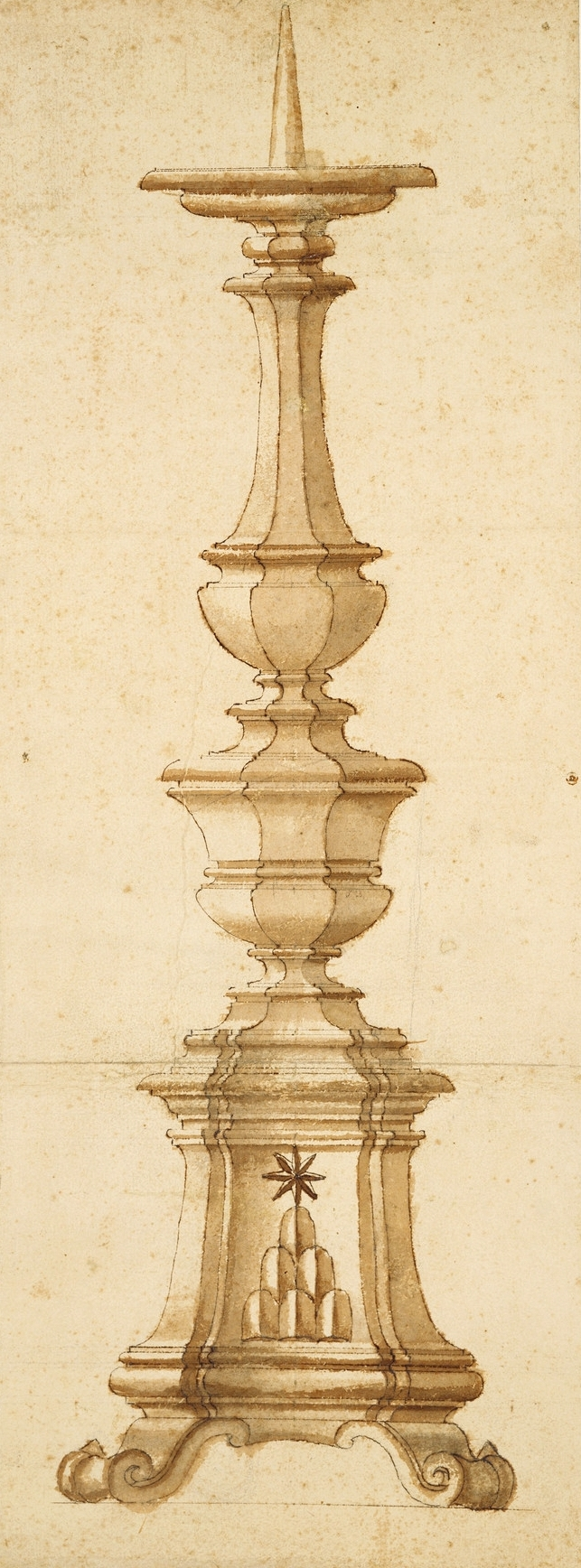
Design of the monumental bronze candlesticks

The two monumental 1.5 m high bronze candlesticks with the Chigi symbols are standing guard at the entrance; these were lit during the celebration of the holy mass. The candlesticks are placed on painted wood plinths. A drawing by a follower of Bernini in the Royal Collection, dated between 1655 and 1665, shows a design for a similar object, although the sketch might have been created for the altar candles of Saint Peter's Basilica. The altar is flanked by two white marble wall flower stands decorated with palm fronds.

Originally Fabio Chigi provided other pieces of ecclesiastical furniture for the restored family chapel. Six gilded bronze candlesticks were placed upon the table of the altar, their shape and number evoking the six mountains of the Chigi emblem. They were variants of those conceived by the artist for the altar of the St. Peter's. They were supplemented by gilded wooden altar cards and a bronze crucifix-tabernacle, the chest of which was supported by four seraphim and the door decorated with a chalice and a radiant host. A similar set was created for the Church of Santa Maria Assunta in Ariccia by Bernini. These liturgical pieces were still recorded in an inventory in the 1720s.

Fabio Chigi granted eight reliquaries to the chapel in 1654 and in 1656, containing the bones of different saints. The two set of small crystal pyramids are preserved in the treasury of the basilica. The pyramidal shape seems to be an homage to pyramidal tombs in the chapel.

== Materials ==
The use of rare and expensive stones all over the chapel is an important characteristic invoking the interior of the Pantheon which was the main source of inspiration for Raphael. He was very much aware that the ancients used more precious materials than contemporary Renaissance architects and intended follow their example. In a letter to Pope Leo X (c. 1519) he wrote:

"...even though these days architecture may be very clever and very closely based on the style of the ancients, [...] nevertheless the ornamentation is not done using raw materials of similar expense to those used by the ancients, who, it seems, realized what they envisaged with endless amounts of money and whose will alone surmounted every difficulty."

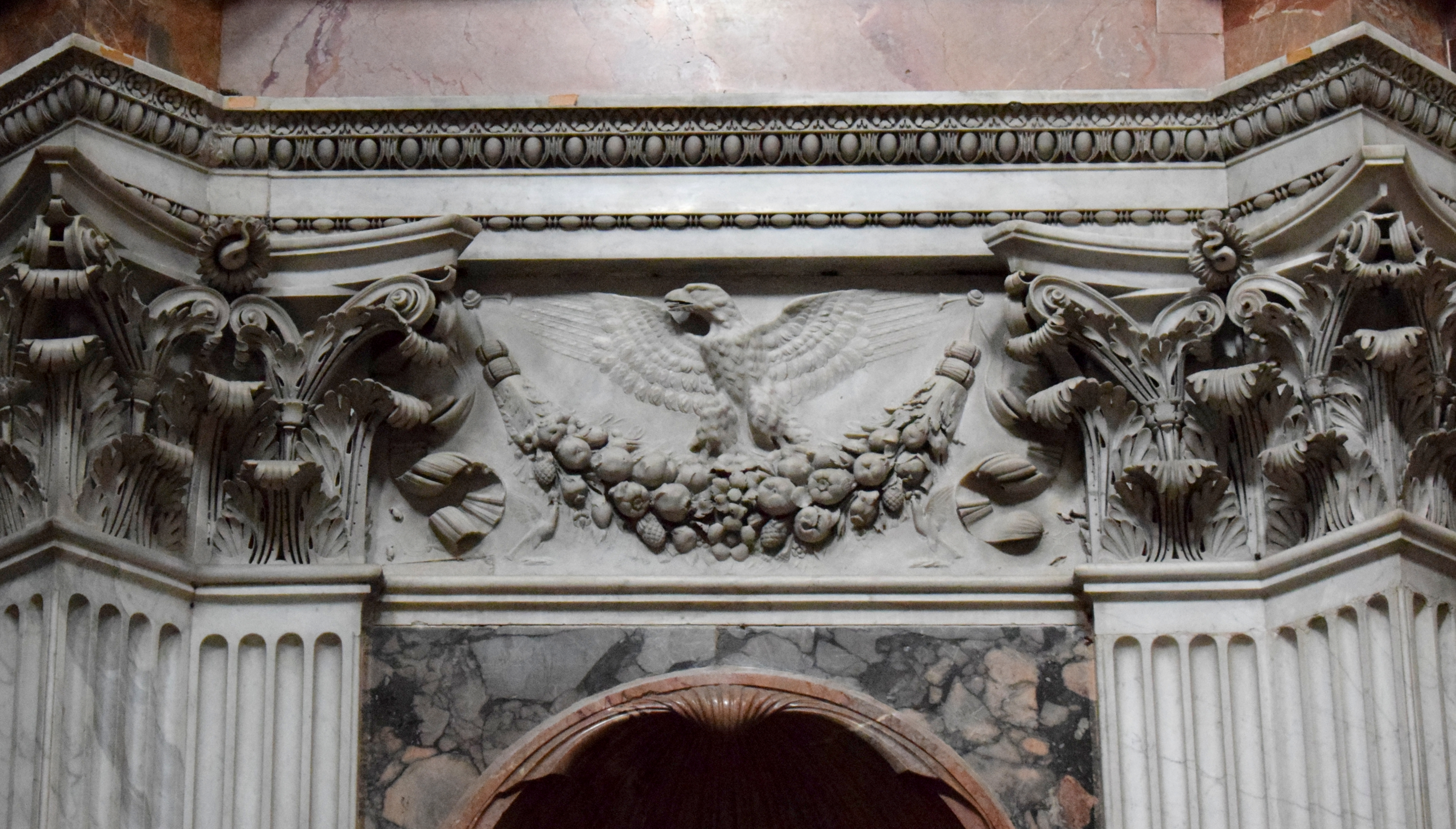
The frieze and the capitals are white "bianco purissimo" marble

As a painter Raphael was naturally attracted to the vivid colours of the different kinds of stones available in Rome since the antiquity, and his patron, Agostino Chigi was one of the few people rich enough to finance a project that aimed to recreate the largely lost chromatic exuberance of ancient architecture. At the time of Raphael the coloured revetment of the Chigi Chapel was a complete novelty in Rome, and it remained exceptional until the Cappella Gregoriana in St. Peter's Basilica was decorated in 1578-80, but during the Baroque era the use of coloured marbles became very common.

White Carrara marble (with grey veins): fluted pilasters; white "bianco purissimo" Carrara marble: capitals and friezes; statuario marble: altar steps; white and grey bardiglio marble: pavement; Egyptian "rosso di Syene" granite: monolith entrance step; africano and rosso antico marble: frames of the niches; rosso di Numidia: shells of the niches; Portasanta marble: pyramids, balusters; verde antico: bases of the pyramids; giallo antico: mouldings of the bases of the pyramids, balustrade; rosso di Numidia and Portasanta rectangles, africano borders: revetment behind the pyramids; arches, entablement and moulding rings of the dome: white Carrara marble; rosso antico: frieze above the tombs.

== In popular culture ==
Part of Dan Brown's 2000 book Angels & Demons takes place in the Chigi Chapel, where the sculpture of Habakkuk and the Angel is one of the four "markers" leading to the Illuminati's secret lair. This is also portrayed in the novel's 2009 film version.

== See also ==
- 16th-century Western domes

== Gallery ==
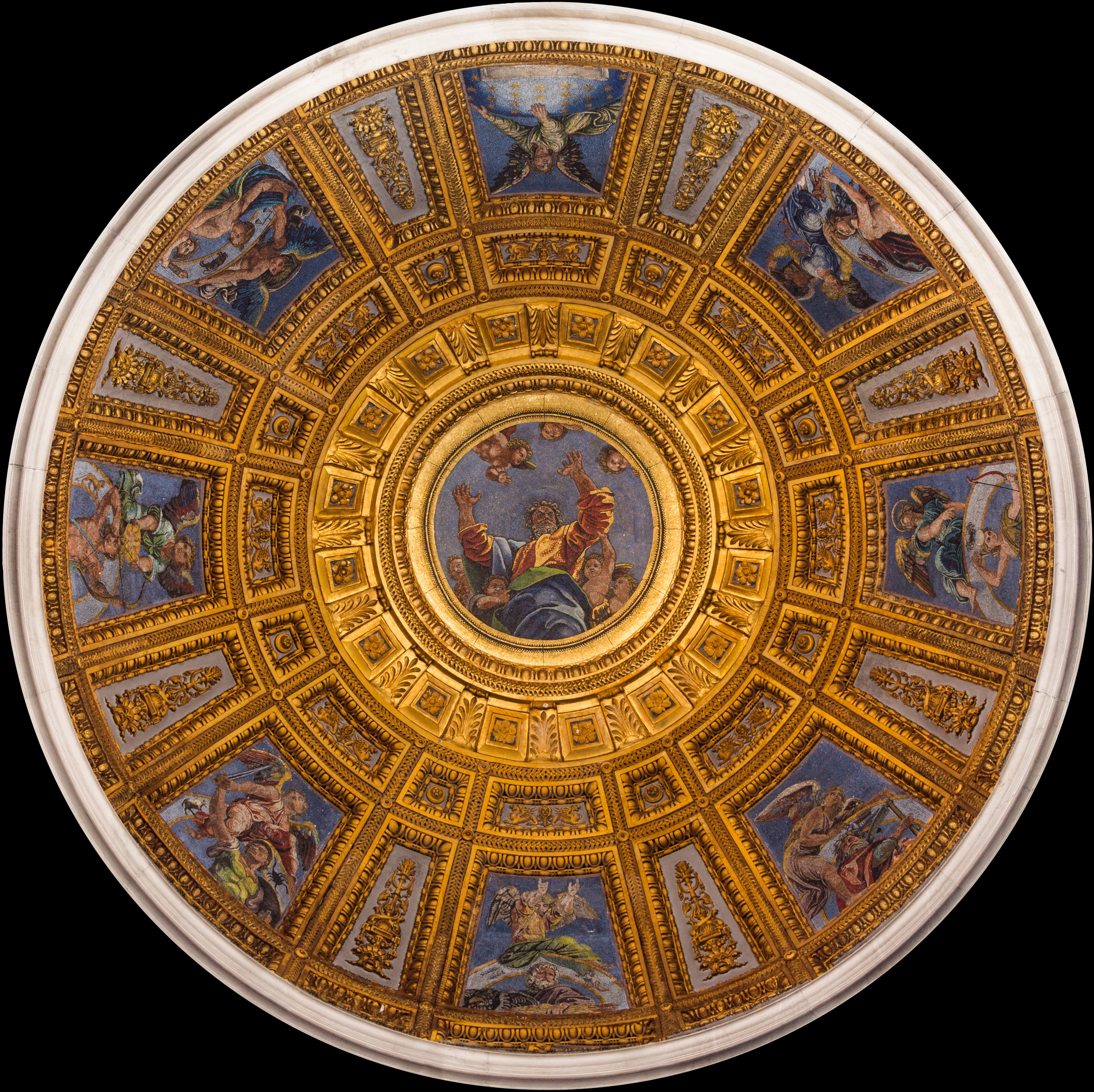
The mosaics of Raphael

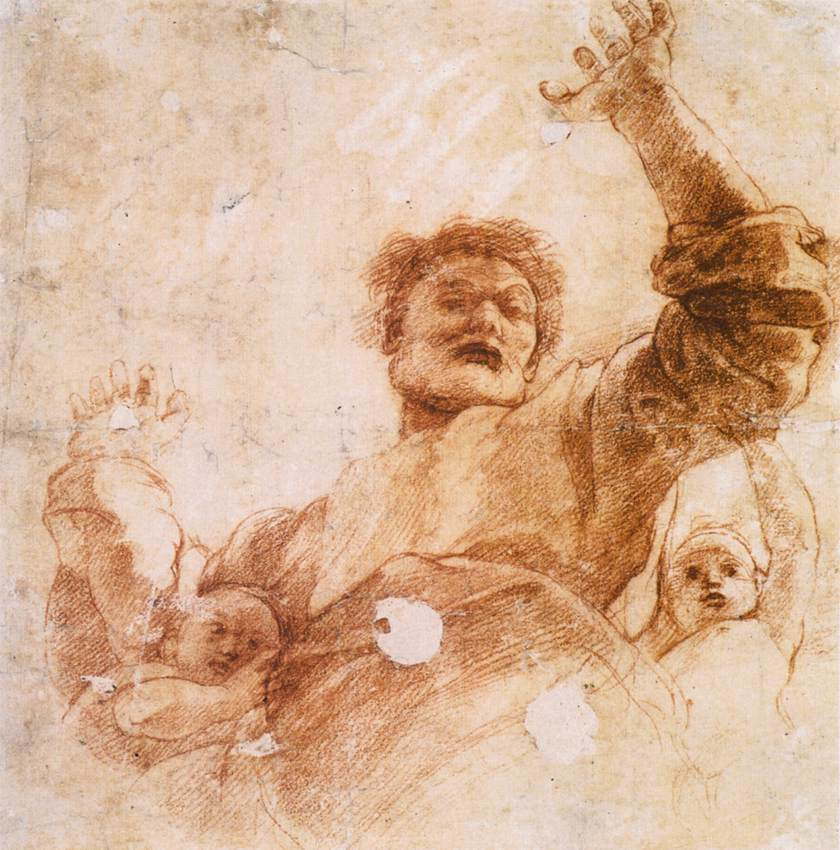
God the Father, study by Raphael for the dome

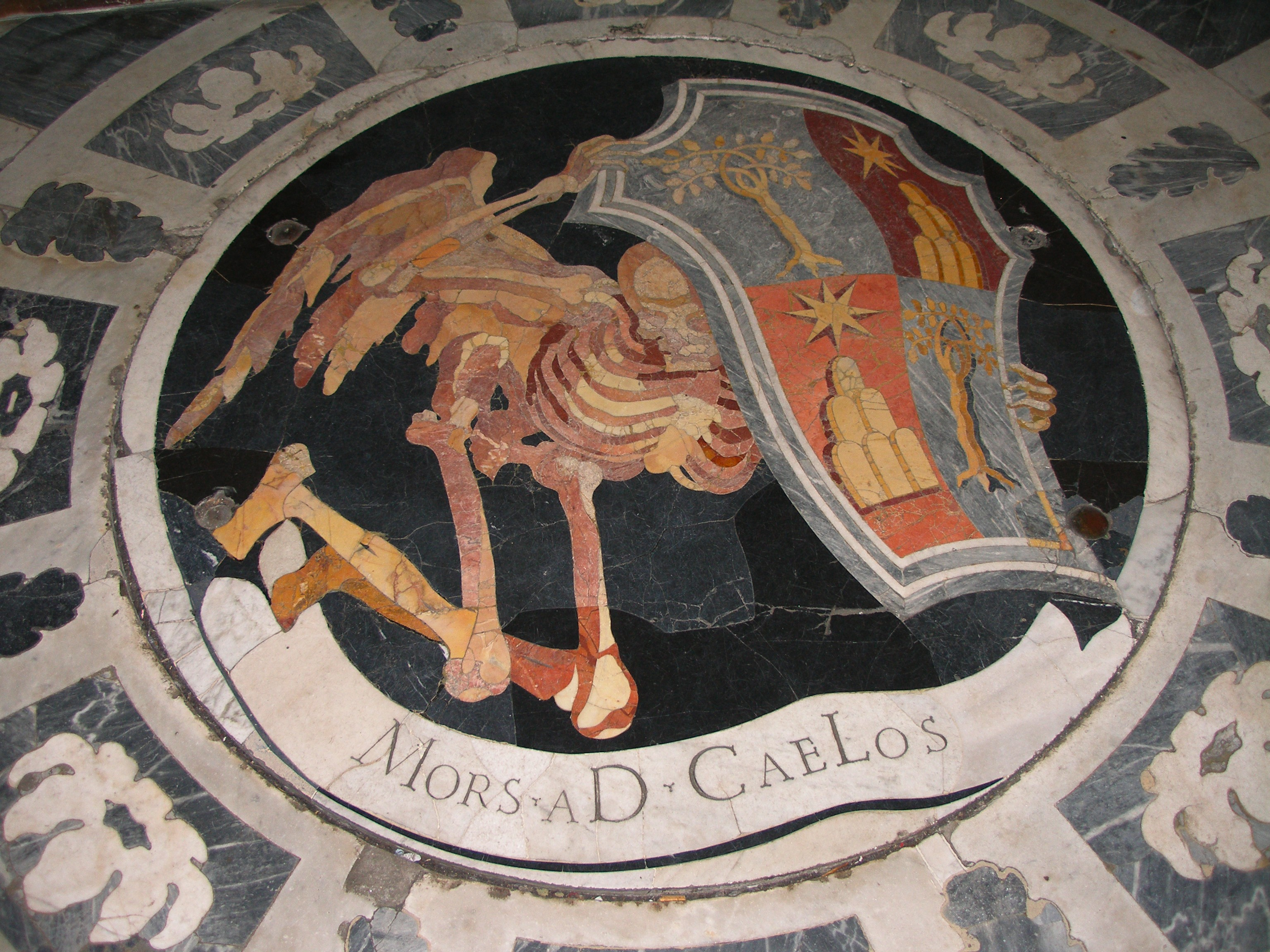
Mors ad caelos pavement

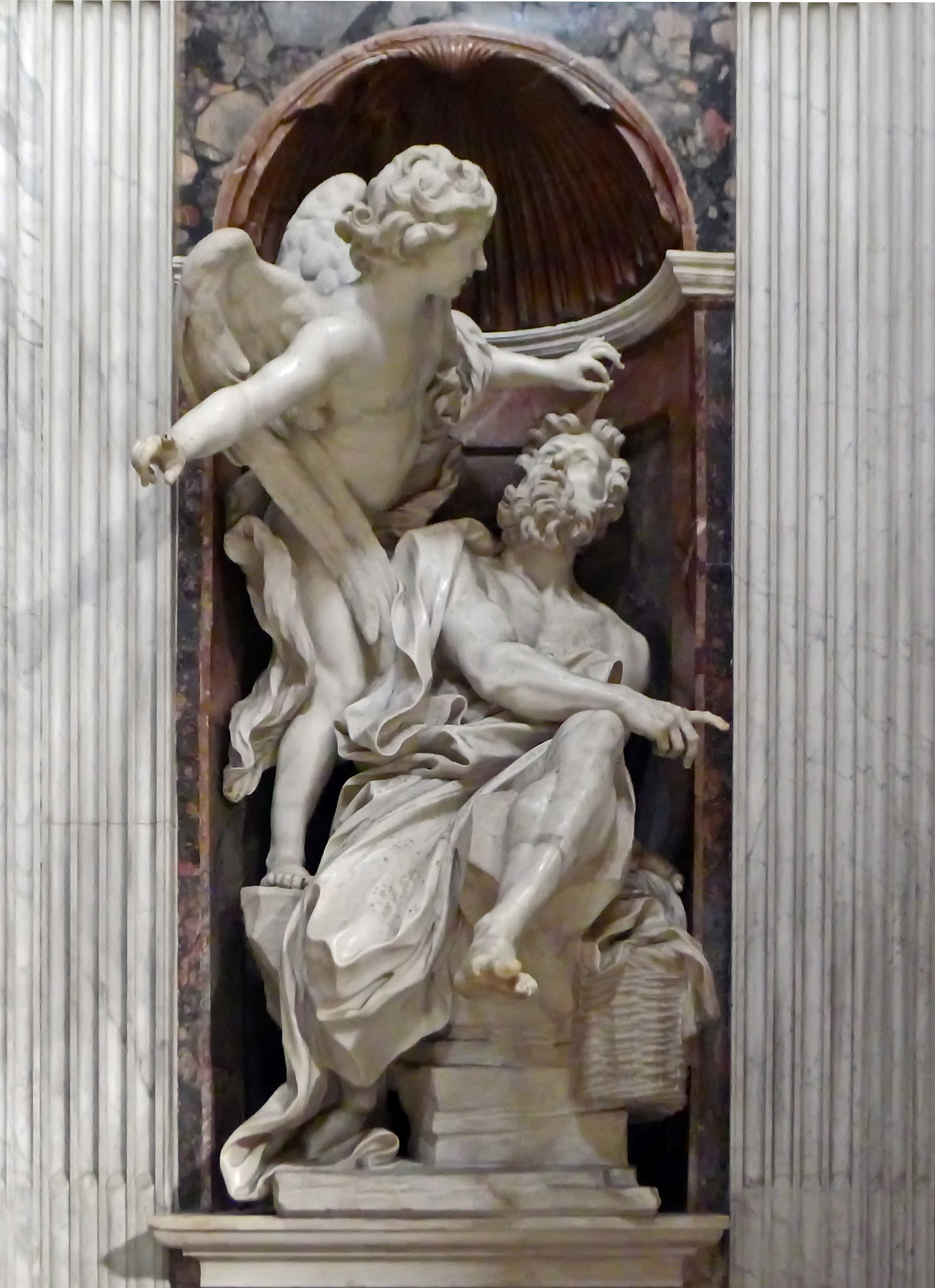
The statue of Habakuk by Bernini

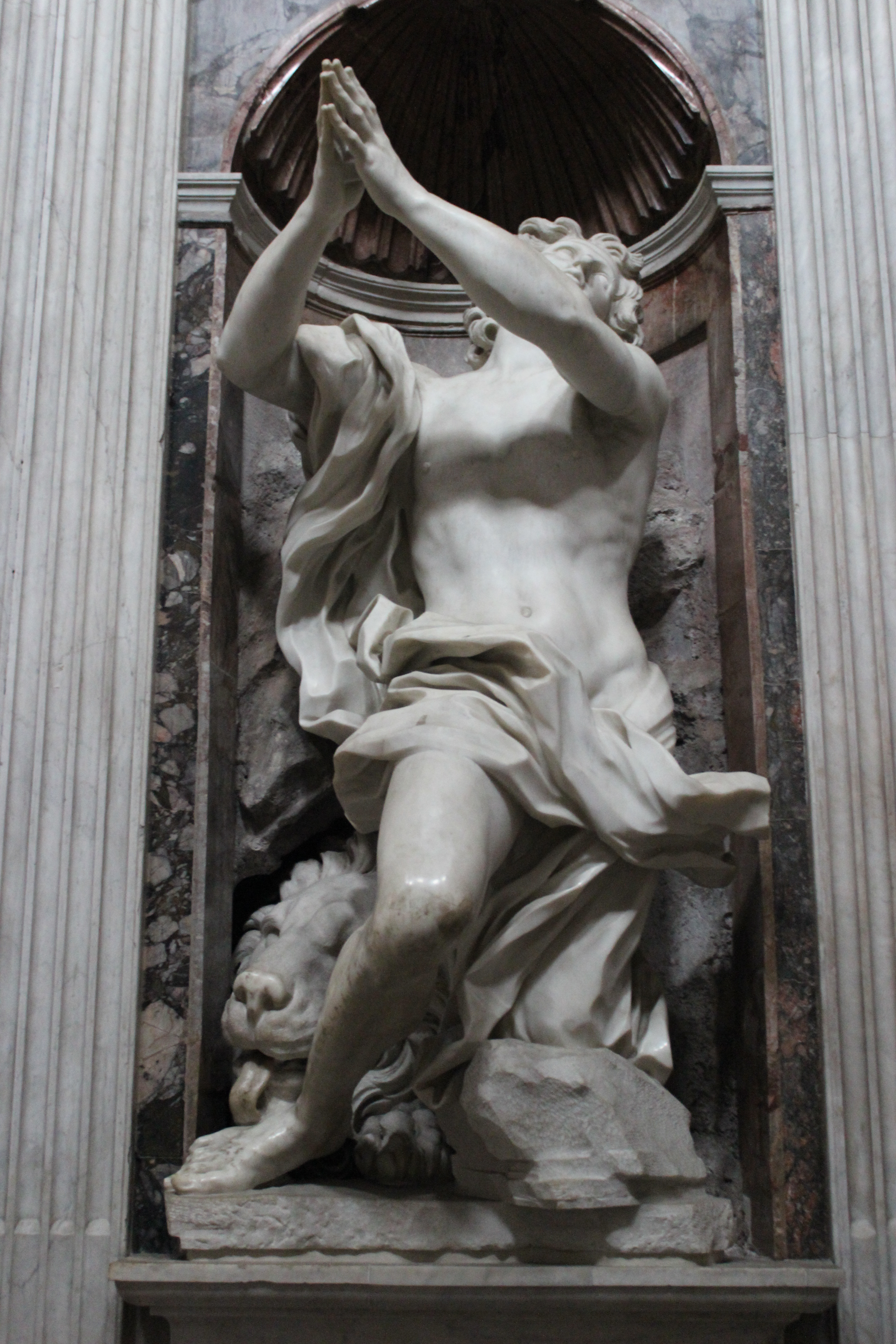
The statue of Daniel by Bernini

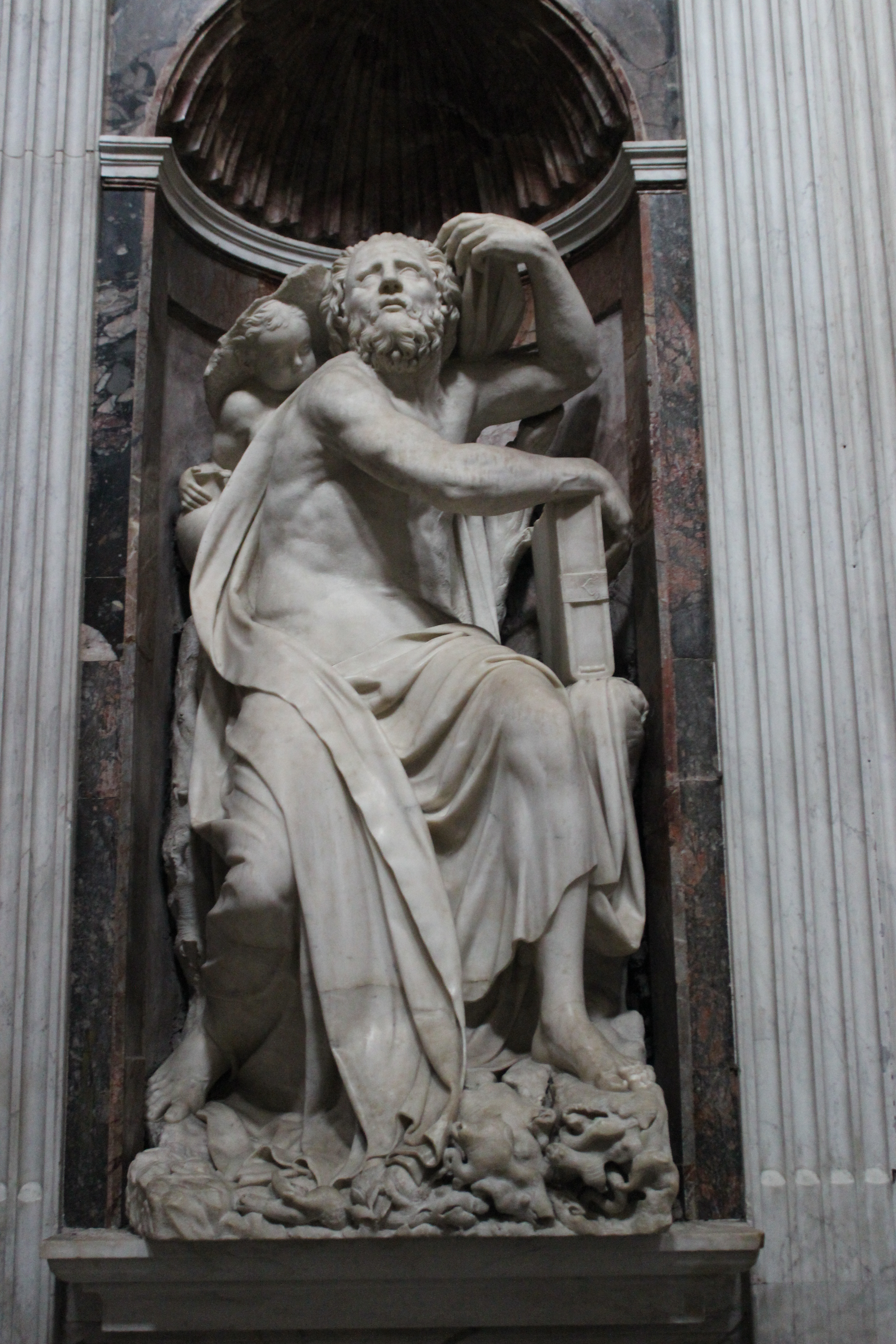
The statue of Elijah by Lorenzetto

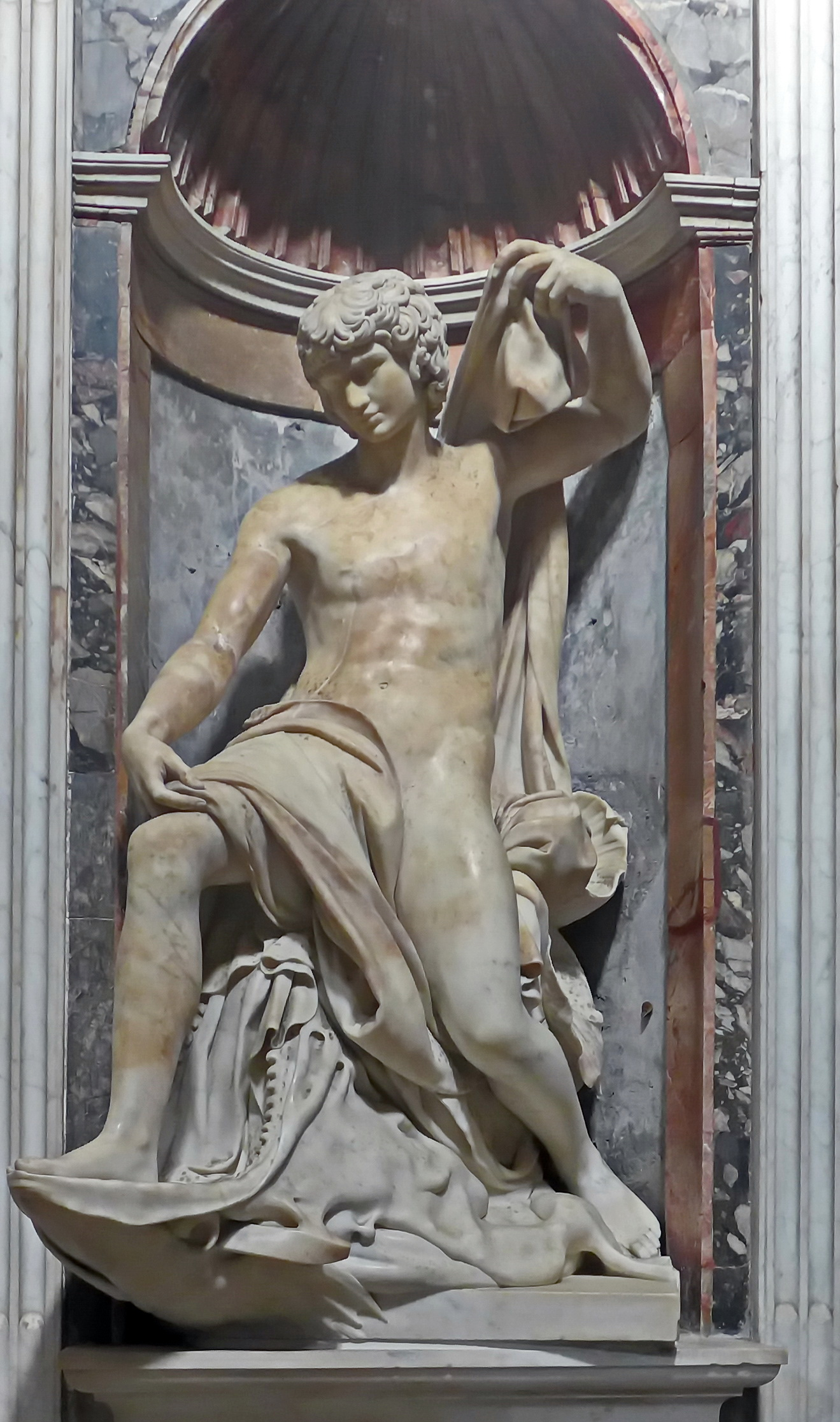
The statue of Jonah by Lorenzetto

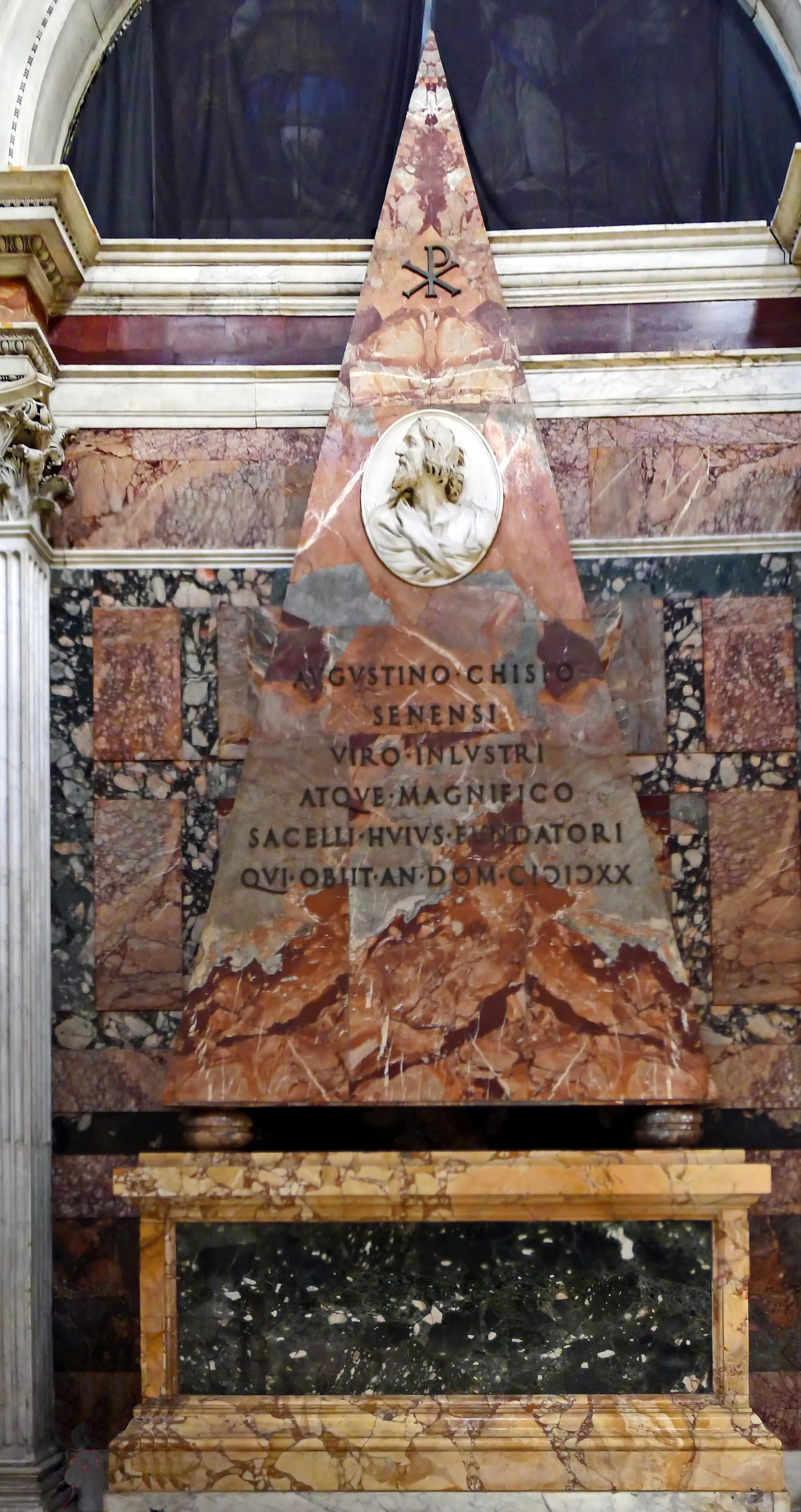
Pyramidal tomb of Agostino Chigi

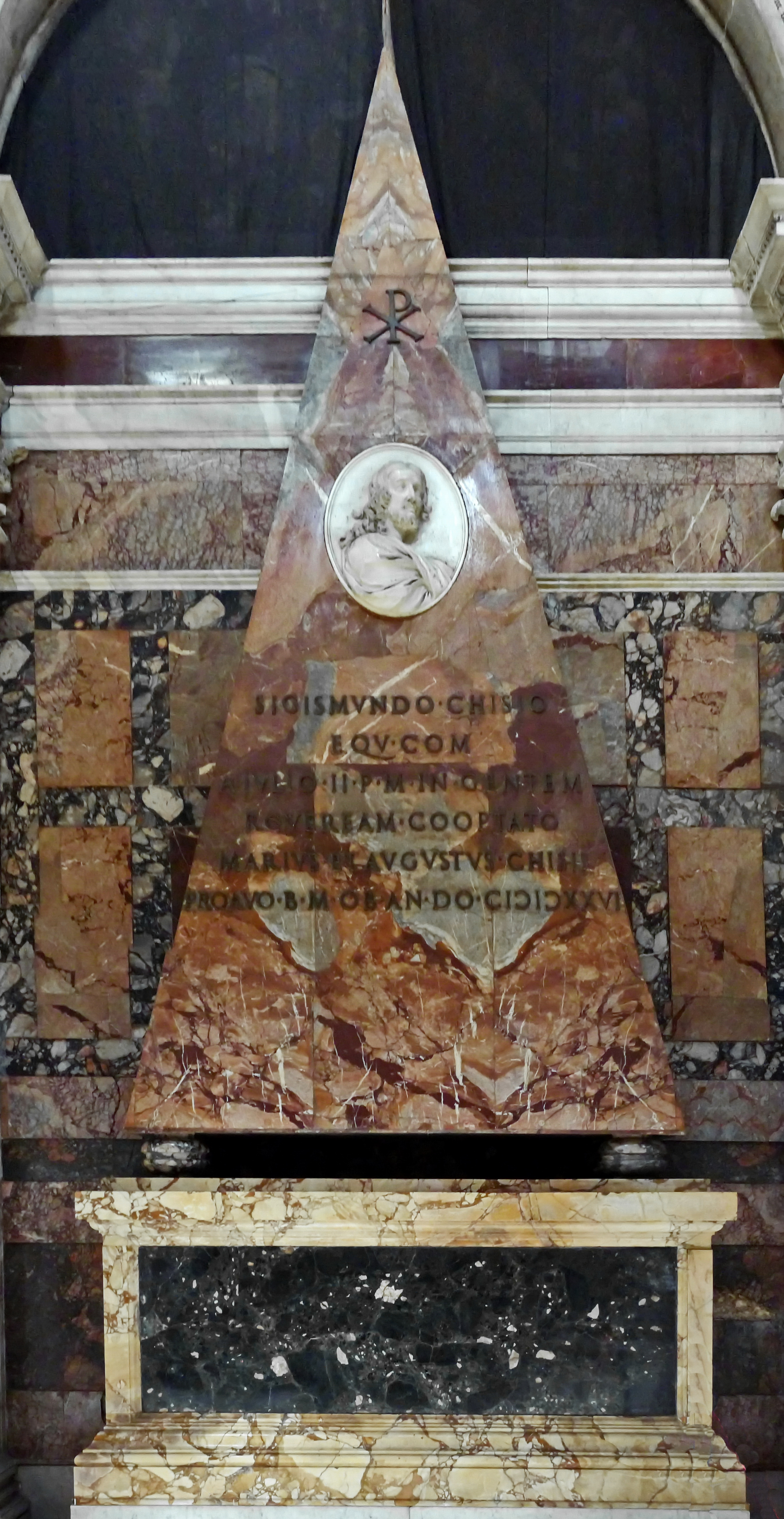
Pyramidal tomb of Sigismondo Chigi

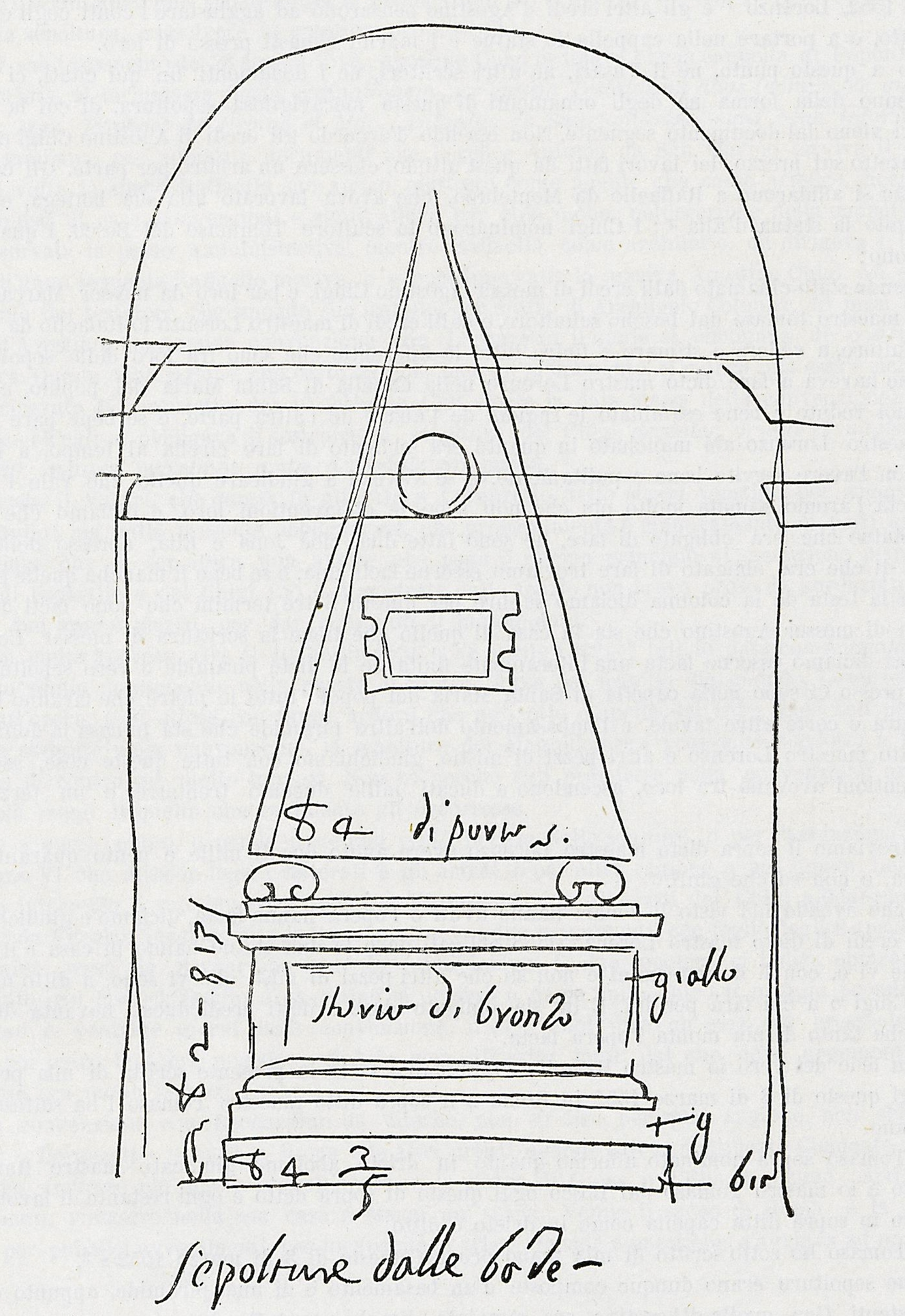
The tomb of Agostino Chigi, sketch attributed to Dosio.

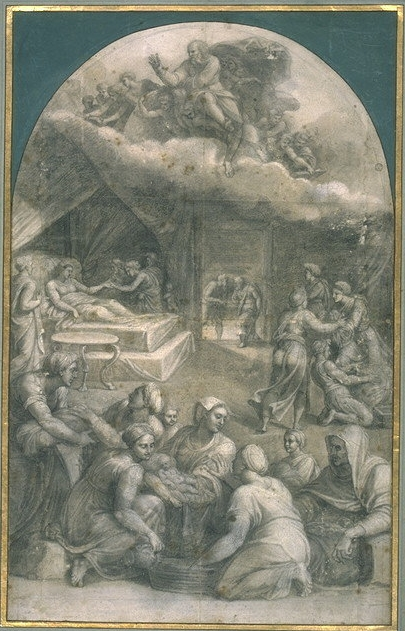
Modello drawing for the altar-piece by Sebastiano del Piombo

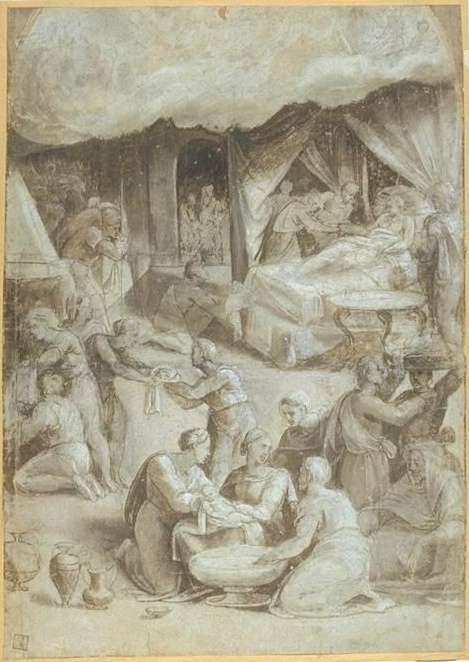
Preparatory study for the altar-piece

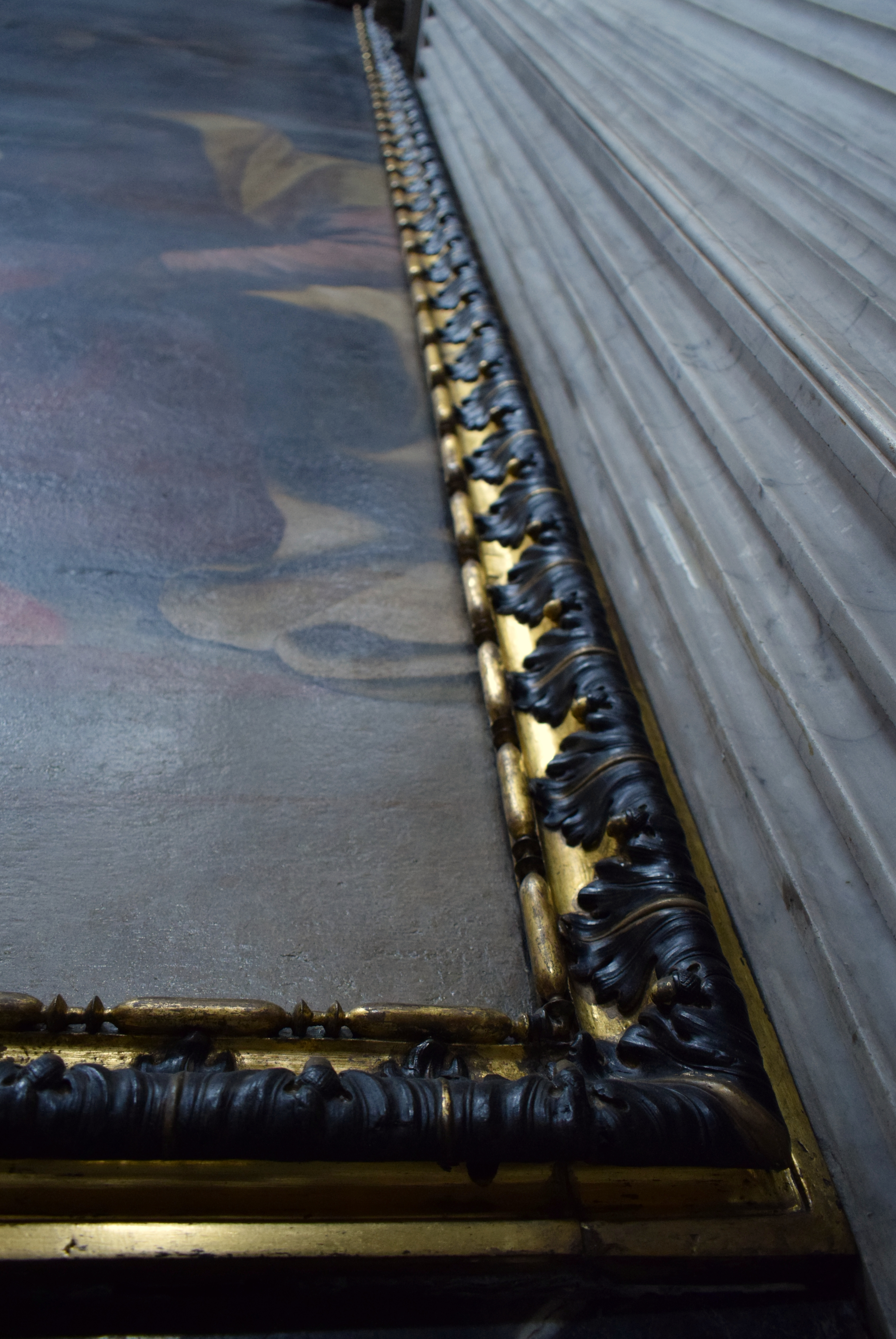
Bronze frame of the altar-piece with acanthus leaves and acorns

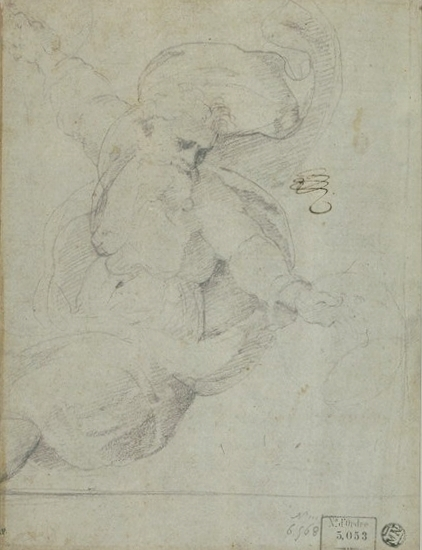
God the Father, study by Sebastiano del Piombo for the tambour

== Bibliography ==
- Marcia B. Hall, Rome (Artistic Centers of the Italian Renaissance), Cambridge University Press, 2005
- Antonio Muñoz, Nelle chiese di Roma. Ritrovamente e restauri. in: Bollettino d'Arte, 1912
- Touring Club Italiano (TCI), Roma e dintorni (Milan) 1965:183f.
