= Outline of sculpture =

Artworks that are three-dimensional objects, and creation thereof

The following outline is provided as an overview of and topical guide to sculpture:

A sculpture – human-made three-dimensional art object.

Sculpture or sculpting – activity of creating sculptures. A person who creates sculptures is called a sculptor.

== What type of thing is sculpture? ==
Sculpture can be described as all of the following:

- Art – aesthetic expression for presentation or performance, and the work produced from this activity. The word "art" is therefore both a verb and a noun, as is the term "sculpture".
  - Work of art – aesthetic physical item or artistic creation.
  - One of the arts – as an art form, sculpture is an outlet of human expression, that is usually influenced by culture and which in turn helps to change culture. Sculpture is a physical manifestation of the internal human creative impulse.
    - A branch of the visual arts – visual arts is a class of art forms, including painting, sculpture, photography, architecture and others, that focus on the creation of works which are primarily visual in nature.
  - Fine art – in Western European academic traditions, fine art is art developed primarily for aesthetics, distinguishing it from applied art that also has to serve some practical function. The word "fine" here does not so much denote the quality of the artwork in question, but the purity of the discipline according to traditional Western European canons.

== Types of sculpture ==
- Architectural sculpture –
- Assemblage –
- Bas relief –
- Bust –
- Earth art –
- Environmental sculpture –
- Figurine –
- Installation art –
- Kinetic sculpture –
- Mobile –
- Statue –

=== Short-lived forms ===
- Gas sculpture
- Ice sculpture
- Rock balancing
- Sand sculpture

=== Styles of sculpture ===
- Detonography –
- Modern sculpture –
- Relief –

== History of sculpture ==
History of sculpture

== Elements ==
- Mass –
- Negative space –
- Space –
- Volume –

== General sculpture concepts ==
- Armature –
- Carving –
- Casting –
- Chisel –
- Direct carving –
- Maquette –
- Model –
- Nude –
- Readymade –
- Relief sculpture –
- Patina –

== Materials used in sculpture ==
=== Traditional Materials ===
- Wood –
- Marble –
- Limestone –
- Granite –
- Porphyry –
- Diorite –
- Jade –
- Ivory –
- Clay –
- Terracotta –
- Bronze –
- Gold –
- Silver –
- Butter –
- Soapstone –

=== Modern Materials ===
- Steel –
- Jesmonite –
- Acrylic –
- Concrete
- Plastic –
- Fiberglass –
- Glass –
- Aluminum –
- Fabric –
- Paper –
- Found object –

== Notable works of sculpture ==
- Venus of Hohle Fels (c. 40–42,000 BP)
- Lion-man of Hohlenstein-Stadel (c. 35–41,000 BP)
- Venus of Willendorf (c. 24–26,000 BP)
- Great Sphinx of Giza (c. 2558–2532 BCE)
- Nefertiti Bust (c. 1345 BCE)
- Mask of Tutankhamun (c. 1323 BCE)
- Abu Simbel temples (c. 1264 BCE)
- Elgin Marbles from the Parthenon (438 BCE)
- Colossus of Rhodes (c. 292 BCE)
- Lion Capital of Ashoka (c. 250 BCE)
- Terracotta Army (246–210 BCE)
- Winged Victory of Samothrace (c. 2nd century BCE)
- Laocoön and His Sons (c. 200 BCE-70 CE)
- Venus de Milo (130–100 BCE)
- Augustus of Prima Porta (c. 1st century CE)
- Equestrian Statue of Marcus Aurelius (175 CE)
- Buddhas of Bamiyan (507–554 CE)
- Great Budda of Nara (752 CE)
- Borobudur (c. 780-833 CE)
- Bayon (c. 12th or 13th century CE)
- Angkor Wat (1150 CE)
- Chartres Cathedral (c. 1194–1250 CE)
- Konark Sun Temple (1250 CE)
- Moai, Easter Islands (1250–1500 CE)
- Pietà (1498–1499)
- David (1501–1504)
- Aztec sun stone (1502–1520)
- Ecstasy of Saint Teresa (1647–1652)
- Veiled Christ (1753)
- Jadeite Cabbage (19th century)
- Nelson's Column (1843)
- Lion of Belfort (1880)
- The Kiss (1882)
- Liberty Enlightening the World, Statue of Liberty (1886)
- The Gates of Hell (1890–1917)
- The Thinker (1904)
- Abraham Lincoln (1920)
- Mount Rushmore Shrine of Democracy (1927–1941)
- Christ the Redeemer (1927–1931)
- The Motherland Calls (1967)
- Fallen Astronaut (1971)
- Mother Ukraine (1981)
- Genghis Khan Equestrian Statue (2008)
- Statue of Unity (2018)

== Selected sculptors ==
=== Antiquity to the 19th century ===
- Agesander of Rhodes –
- Antonio Canova –
- Baccio da Montelupo –
- Bartolommeo Bandinelli –
- Benedetto da Maiano –
- Benvenuto Cellini –
- Bertoldo di Giovanni –
- Domenico Rosselli –
- Donatello –
- Giambologna –
- Gian Lorenzo Bernini –
- Giovanni Francesco Rustici –
- Giovanni Pisano –
- Jean-Antoine Houdon –
- Kresilas –
- Michelangelo –
- Myron –
- Nicola Pisano –
- Phidias –
- Pietro di Francesco degli Orioli –
- Polykleitos –
- Raffaello da Montelupo –

=== 19th to 20th century (Modern) ===
- Adolf von Hildebrand –
- Alberto Giacometti –
- Alexander Calder –
- Alexander Rodchenko –
- Antoine Bourdelle –
- Aristide Maillol –
- Auguste Rodin –
- Barbara Hepworth –
- Camille Claudel –
- Chaim Gross –
- Charles Despiau –
- Constantin Brâncuși –
- David Smith –
- Ernst Barlach –
- François Pompon –
- Frederick John Kiesler –
- Gaston Lachaise –
- Germaine Richier –
- Giacomo Manzù –
- Henri Matisse –
- Henry Moore –
- Isamu Noguchi –
- Jacob Epstein –
- Jacques Lipchitz –
- Jean/Hans Arp –
- Jean Dubuffet –
- Joan Miró –
- Jose de Creeft –
- Julio González –
- Kurt Schwitters –
- Louise Berliawsky Nevelson –
- Lucio Fontana –
- Marino Marini –
- Max Ernst –
- Medardo Rosso –
- Naum Gabo –
- Pablo Picasso –
- Pablo Serrano –
- Umberto Boccioni –
- Vladimir Tatlin –

=== Contemporary ===
- Alice Aycock –
- Anthony Caro –
- Barry Flanagan –
- Beverly Pepper –
- Bill Barrett –
- Bruce Nauman –
- César Baldaccini –
- Charles Ginnever –
- Claes Oldenburg –
- Clement Meadmore –
- Dan Flavin –
- Donald Judd –
- Eduardo Chillida –
- Ellsworth Kelly –
- Eva Hesse –
- Fernando Botero –
- Frank Stella –
- George Segal –
- Isaac Witkin –
- James Rosati –
- Jean Tinguely –
- Joel Shapiro –
- John Chamberlain –
- John Raymond Henry –
- Joseph Beuys –
- Kenneth Snelson –
- Leonard Baskin –
- Louise Bourgeois –
- Lyman Kipp –
- Marisol Escobar –
- Mark di Suvero –
- Martin Puryear –
- Michael Heizer –
- Nam June Paik –
- Nancy Graves –
- Niki de Saint Phalle –
- Peter Reginato –
- Rebecca Horn –
- Richard Long –
- Richard Serra –
- Robert H. Hudson –
- Robert Morris –
- Robert Smithson –
- Tony Cragg –
- Tony Rosenthal –
- Tony Smith –
- Vito Acconci –
- William G. Tucker –
- Wolf Vostell –

== Arts similar to sculpture ==
- Bone carving –
- Butter sculpture –
- Collage –
- Costuming –
- Doll making –
- Dynamic textures –
- Earth Art –
- Floral design –
- Ikebana –
- Glassblowing –
- Hologram –
- Ice carving –
- Ivory carving –
- Mask –
- Mosaics –
- Origami –
- Pottery –
- Pumpkin carving –
- Sand sculpture –
- Sugar sculpture –
- Wood carving –
- Wrought iron –

== See also ==
- List of most expensive sculptures
