= Daniel and the Lion (Bernini) =

Sculpture by Gian Lorenzo Bernini

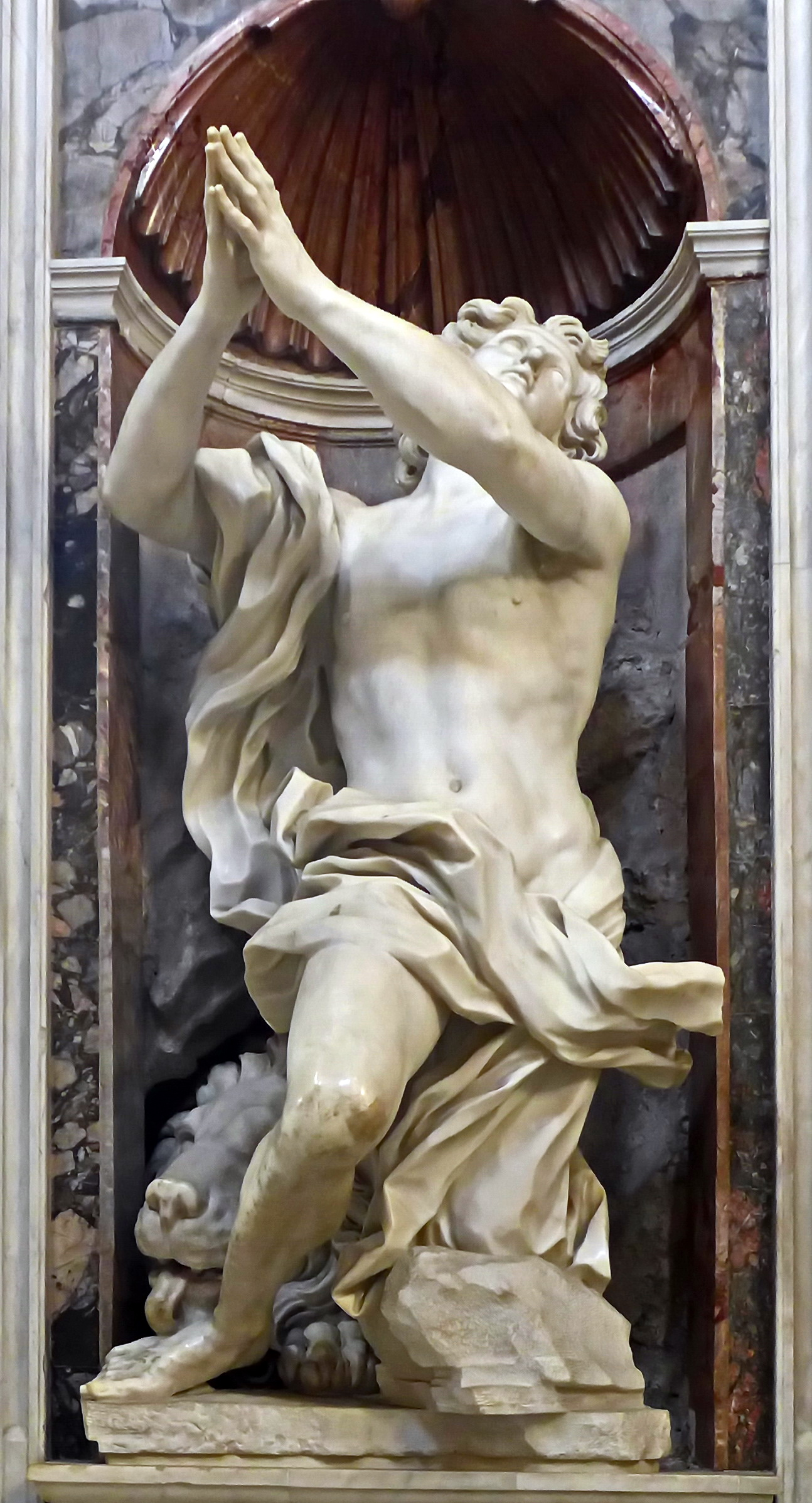
- Artist: Gian Lorenzo Bernini
- Year: 1655-56
- Type: Statue
- Location: Chigi Chapel; Rome
- Preceded by: Corpus (Bernini)
- Followed by: Habakkuk and the Angel (Bernini)

Daniel and the Lion is a sculpture created by Gian Lorenzo Bernini c. 1655–57. Standing in a niche in the Chigi Chapel in the Basilica of Santa Maria del Popolo in Rome, it shows the Prophet Daniel in the lions' den. It forms a part of a larger composition with the sculpture of Habakkuk and the Angel diagonally opposite.

== History ==
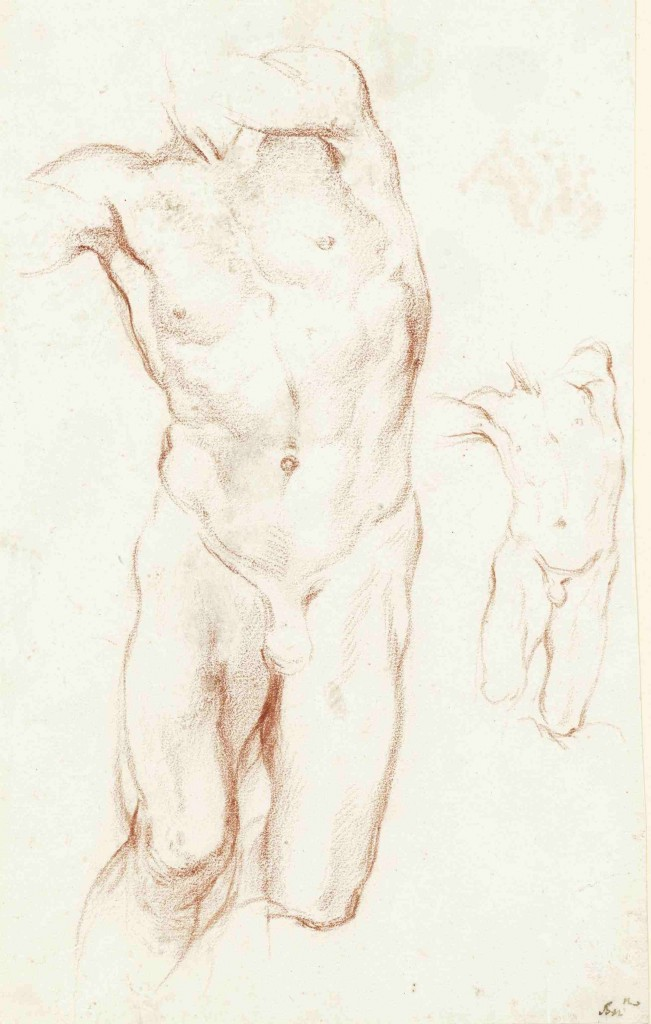
Studies for the statue in Leipzig

Gian Lorenzo Bernini began to work in the chapel in 1652 for Fabio Chigi, the cardinal-priest of the basilica. His patron was elected pope under the name of Alexander VII in 1655 giving a fresh impetus for the reconstruction of the funerary chapel. At the time the two niches at the sides of the main altar were still empty while the other two on the left and right of the entrance were filled with the statues of Lorenzetto created after Raphael's design: Jonah and the Whale and Elijah.

A surviving drawing from the workshop of Bernini proves that the architect at first planned to move the two Raphaelesque statues to the empty niches by the altar but soon he changed his mind. He created two new statues depicting the prophets Daniel and Habakkuk, and these sculptures formed a larger composition facing each other diagonally across the space of the chapel. Bernini created a spatial relationship that enlivened the entire chapel, turning its classical form to a new religious use.

The statue of Daniel was placed in the niche to left of the entrance. On 26 June 1657 Bernini received 1000 scudi for the figure of Daniel which was then already in its place. The surviving preparatory drawings (four studies in the Museum der bildenden Künste in Leipzig) prove that the inspiration for the statue was provided by the famous Laocoön group. The drawings show the creative process through which the classical models were studied and reinvented by the Baroque artist. A preparatory terracotta model for the statue also survived in the Vatican Museums. Formerly thought to be the work of an assistant, after its cleaning in the 1980s it has been mainly attributed to Bernini himself, and even bears his fingerprints.

== Description ==
The sculpture shows the characteristic elongation of the body which is typical of Bernini's so-called late style. The young prophet is kneeling, and his right foot is licked by the tame lion. Daniel is praying fervently, he reaches out to the right from the niche while his head turns up to God, the father depicted on the mosaic of the dome. The drapery is flowing in angular folds from the shoulders and across his loin.

There are obvious thematic and visual parallels with the statue of Jonah by Lorenzetto in the chapel. Both stories symbolize the escape from death by the grace of God, and death threatens both prophets in the form of a dangerous beast, in the case of Jonah, the whale and in the case of Daniel, the lion. The prophets are youthful, athletic heroes, more like ancient gods than the typical bearded men of the Old Testament. The head of Jonah was inspired by the ancient statues of Antinous; and Bernini also chose an ancient model for the head of Daniel, Alexander the Great.

== See also ==
- List of works by Gian Lorenzo Bernini
