= Habakkuk and the Angel (Bernini) =

Sculpture by Bernini

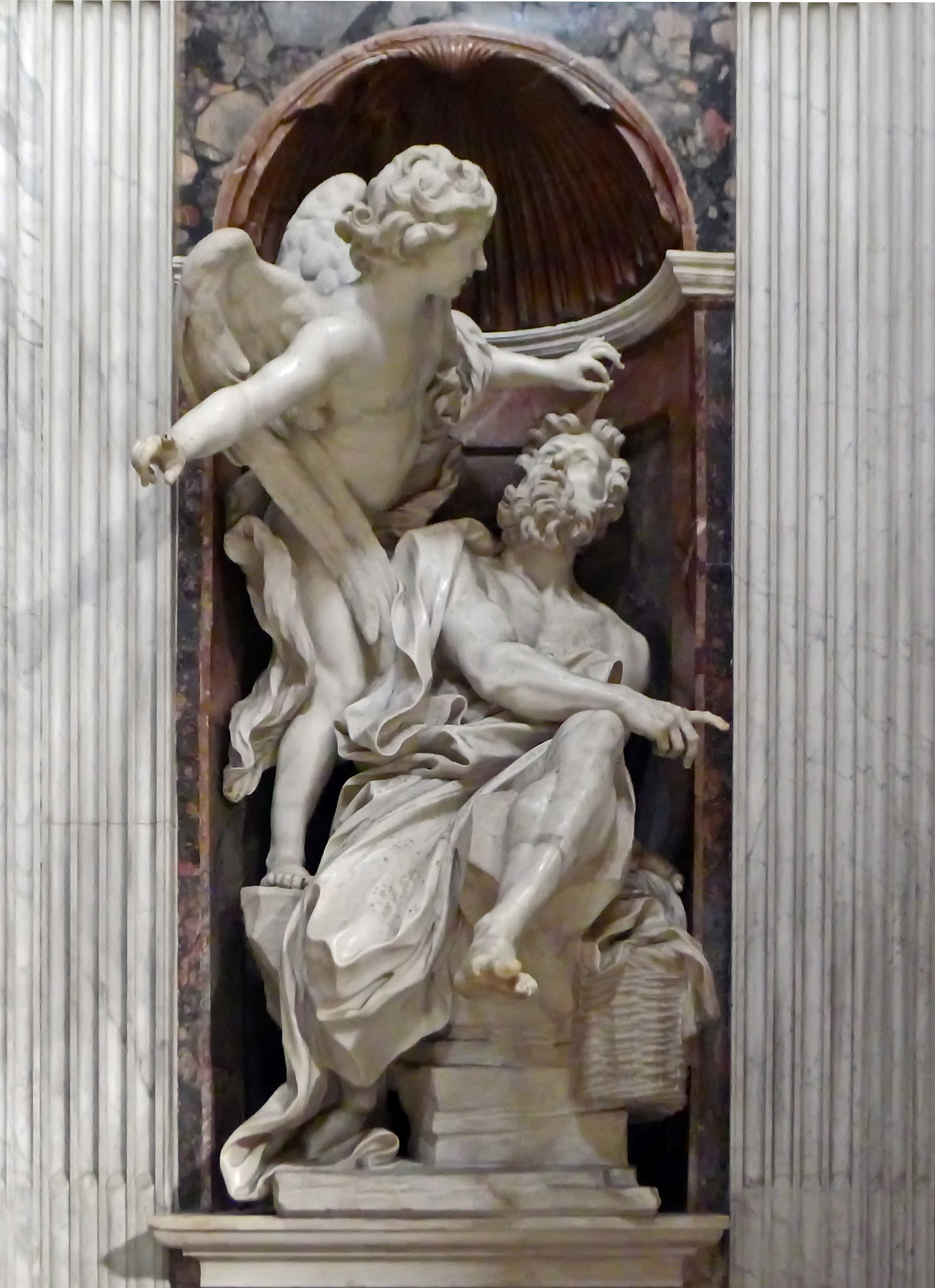
- Artist: Gian Lorenzo Bernini
- Year: 1656-61
- Type: Statue
- Location: Chigi Chapel; Rome
- Preceded by: Daniel and the Lion (Bernini)
- Followed by: Chair of Saint Peter

Habakkuk and the Angel is a sculpture created by Gian Lorenzo Bernini c. 1656–61. Standing in a niche in the Chigi Chapel in the Basilica of Santa Maria del Popolo in Rome, it shows the Prophet Habakkuk with the angel of God. It forms a part of a larger composition with the sculpture of Daniel and the Lion diagonally opposite.

== History ==
Gian Lorenzo Bernini began to work in the chapel in 1652 for Fabio Chigi, the cardinal-priest of the basilica. His patron was elected pope under the name of Alexander VII in 1655 giving a fresh impetus for the reconstruction of the funerary chapel. At the time the two niches at the sides of the main altar were still empty while the other two on the left and right of the entrance were filled with the statues of Lorenzetto created after Raphael's design: Jonah and the Whale and Elijah.

A surviving drawing from the workshop of Bernini proves that the architect at first planned to move the two Raphaelesque statues to the empty niches by the altar but soon he changed his mind. He created two new statues depicting the Prophet Daniel and Habakkuk, and these sculptures formed a larger composition facing each other diagonally across the space of the chapel. Bernini created a spatial relationship that enlivened the entire chapel, turning its classical form to a new religious use.

The statue of Habakkuk was placed in the niche to right of the main altar. The sculpture was set up in its place in November 1661 but Bernini was working on it since October 1656.

A terracotta model for the statue also survived in the Vatican Museums. Since being cleaned in the 1980s it has been attributed to Bernini himself but Dickerson and Sigel thought to be the work of an assistant, probably Ercole Ferrata who was working with Bernini around the time of the creation of the Habakkuk.

== Description ==
In spite of the narrow niche Bernini produced a lively and dramatic composition. Habakkuk is seated on a rock with his lunch basket at his side and pointing towards the direction he wants to go, while the young and beautiful angel is leaning out of the niche, lifting Habakkuk's head by his hair and pointing toward Daniel on the other side of the chapel. The prophet is portrayed as a bearded, older but still strong man.

Bernini depicted a story from the Book of Daniel which tells how God saved Daniel from starving through the miraculous appearance of Prophet Habakkuk in the lions' den (Daniel 14:33-36):

"Now the prophet Habakkuk was in Judea; he had made a stew and had broken bread into a bowl, and was going into the field to take it to the reapers. But the angel of the Lord said to Habakkuk, “Take the food that you have to Babylon, to Daniel, in the lions’ den.” Habakkuk said, “Sir, I have never seen Babylon, and I know nothing about the den.” Then the angel of the Lord took him by the crown of his head and carried him by his hair; with the speed of the wind he set him down in Babylon, right over the den."

After the grateful Daniel ate his dinner, the angel of the Lord carried Habakkuk back to his place. This story is part of the Greek Additions to Daniel comprising chapter 14 in the Vulgate. Iconographically the statue of Habakkuk has its counterpart in the chapel in the Raphaelesque statue of Elijah which also shows a prophet saved from hunger by the angel of the Lord.

Another reason why Bernini probably chose to picture this episode is that the Chigi Library contained the only known Septuagint text of the Book of Daniel from which the story was drawn, the Codex Chisianus 45. Two early guides of the basilica, those of Alberici (1600) and Landucci (1646), identified the then-existing statues of the chapel as Jonah and Habakkuk, instead of their real subjects, Jonah and Elijah. The mistake could be an indication that a statue of Habakkuk had been part of the iconographic program of the chapel at an earlier stage.

== See also ==
- List of works by Gian Lorenzo Bernini
