= Bertoldo di Giovanni =

Italian Renaissance sculptor

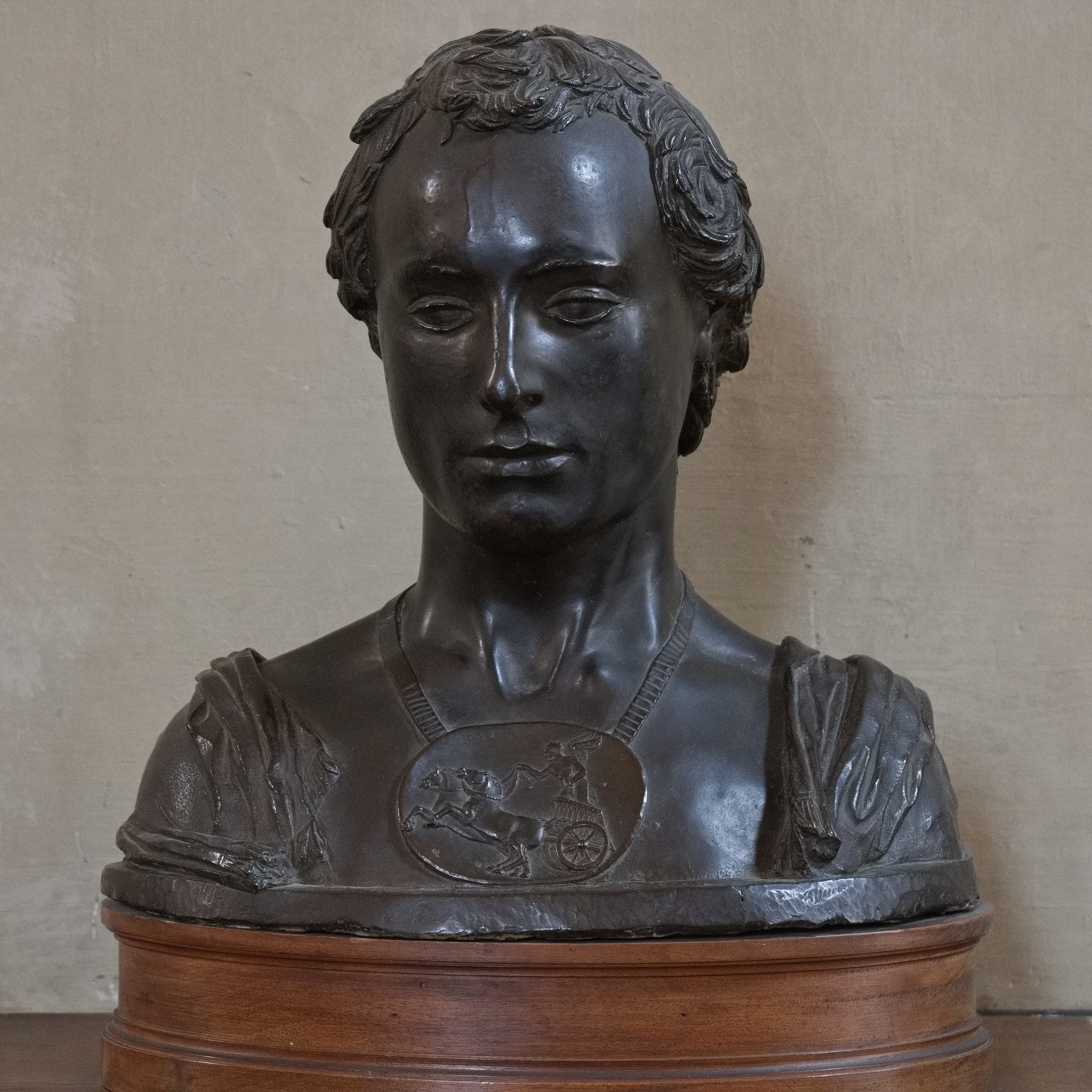
Bertoldo di Giovanni, Young Philosopher, c1470, Florence, Bargello

Bertoldo di Giovanni (after 1420, in Poggio a Caiano – 28 December 1491, in Florence) was an Italian Renaissance sculptor and medallist.

Most of his sculptures, as opposed to medals, were small bronzes for the Medici, of the sort Giambologna produced a century later. Vasari does not give him his own biography, but mentions him several times, as the link between Donatello and Michelangelo. Only two pieces are signed, a statuette of Orpheus in Vienna, and the Mehmet medal, but by the Frick exhibition in 2019, the first to be dedicated to him, 24 objects were attributed to him, some in wood and plaster.

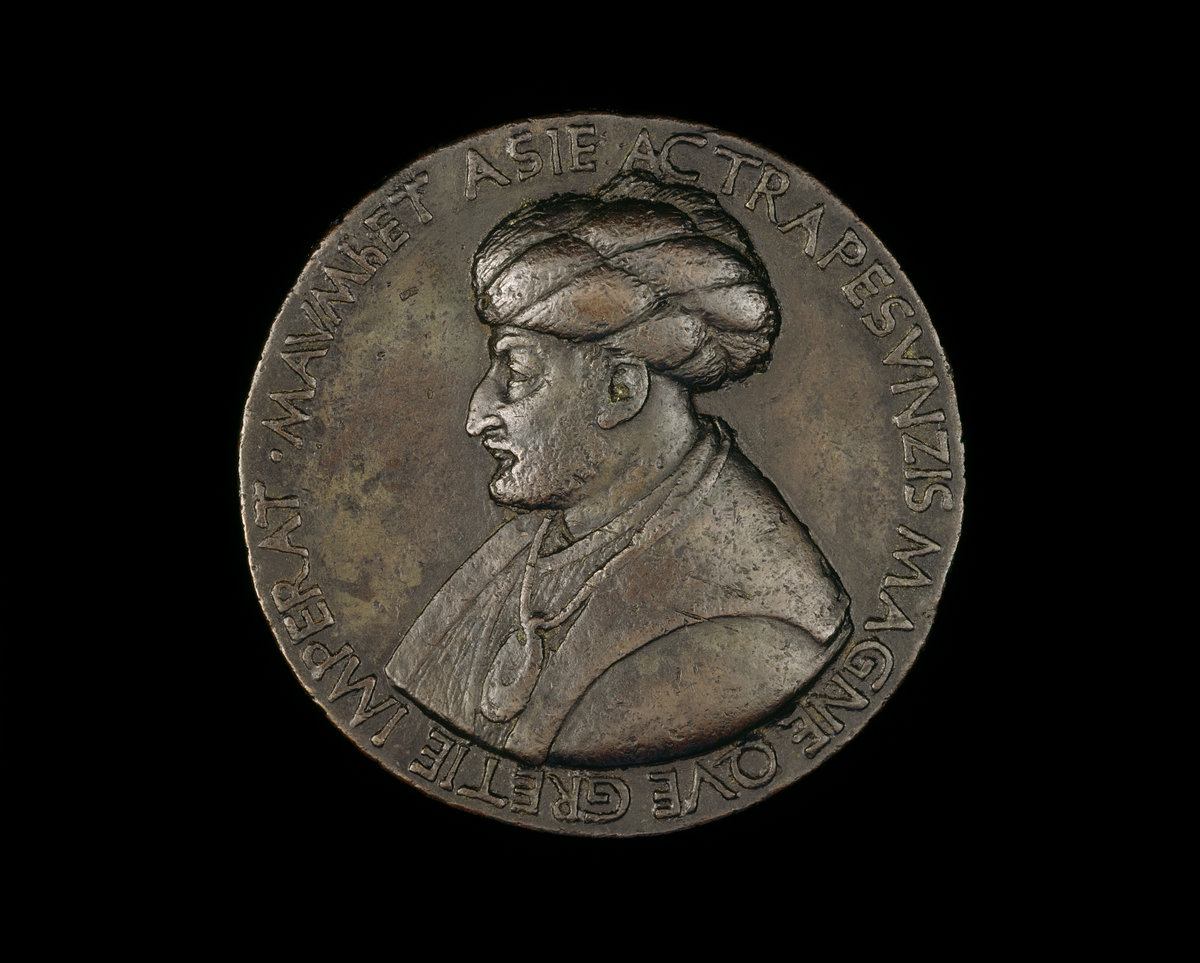
Mehmed the Conqueror. Medal of Bertoldo di Giovanni, 1480.

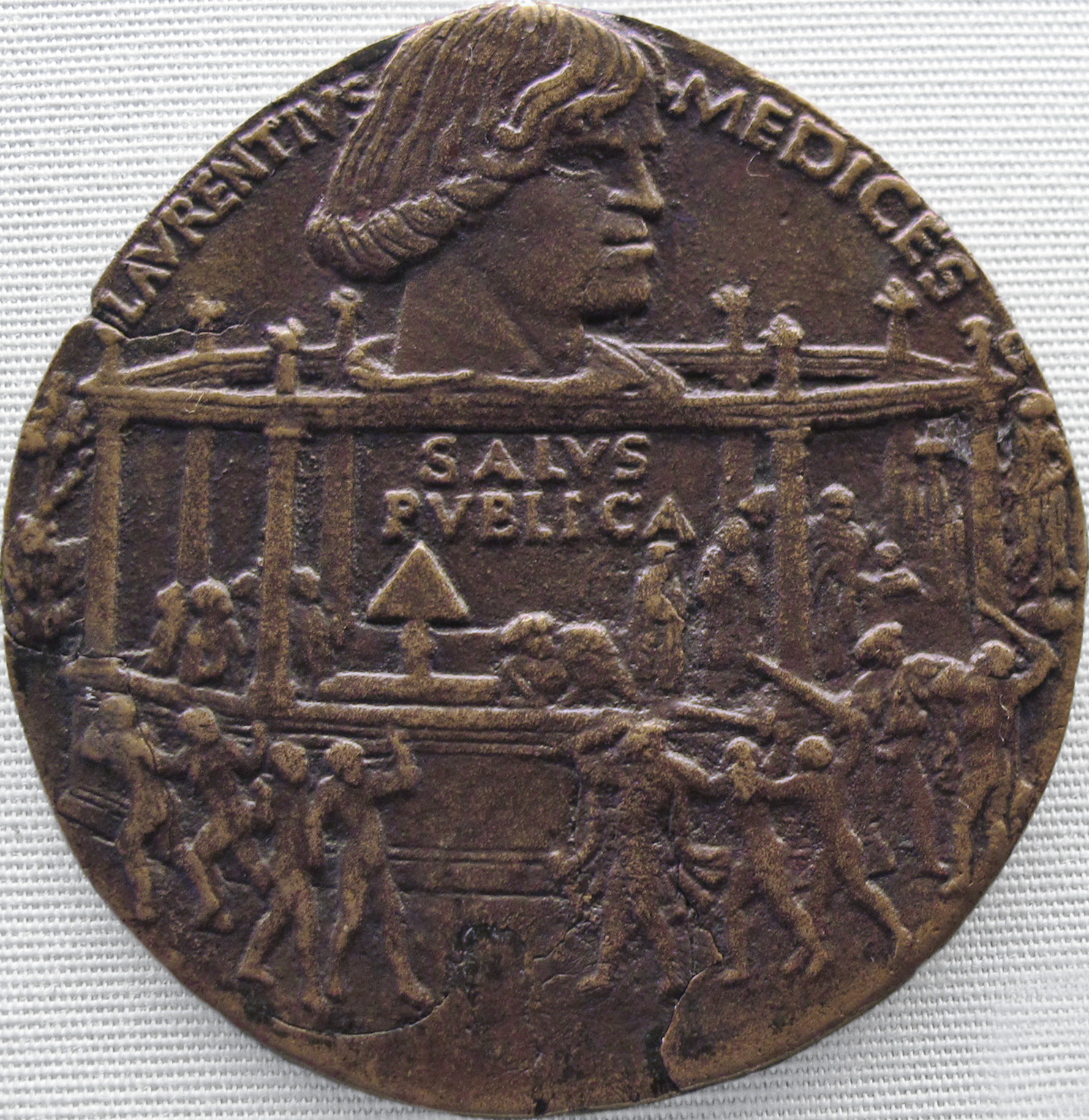
Bertoldo di Giovanni, medal on the Pazzi conspiracy, 1478

== Life ==
Bertoldo was a pupil of Donatello. He worked in Donatello's workshop for many years, completing Donatello's unfinished works after his death in 1466, for example the bronze pulpit reliefs from the life of Christ in the Basilica di San Lorenzo di Firenze in Florence.

Bertoldo later became head and teacher of the informal academy for painters and in particular for sculptors, which Lorenzo de' Medici had founded in his garden. At the same time, Bertoldo was the custodian of the Roman antiquities there. Though Bertoldo was not a major sculptor, some of the most significant sculptors of their time attended this school, such as Michelangelo, Baccio da Montelupo, Giovanni Francesco Rustici and Jacopo Sansovino.

== Works ==
Di Giovanni was the sculptor of a medal of Sultan Mehmed the Conqueror (see image). Di Giovanni along with a number of collaborators created the "Frieze for the portico of the Medici Villa at Poggio a Caiano. He is the author of several medals that were formerly attributed by error to Antonio del Pollaiuolo.
