= Baccio da Montelupo =

Italian artist (1469–1523

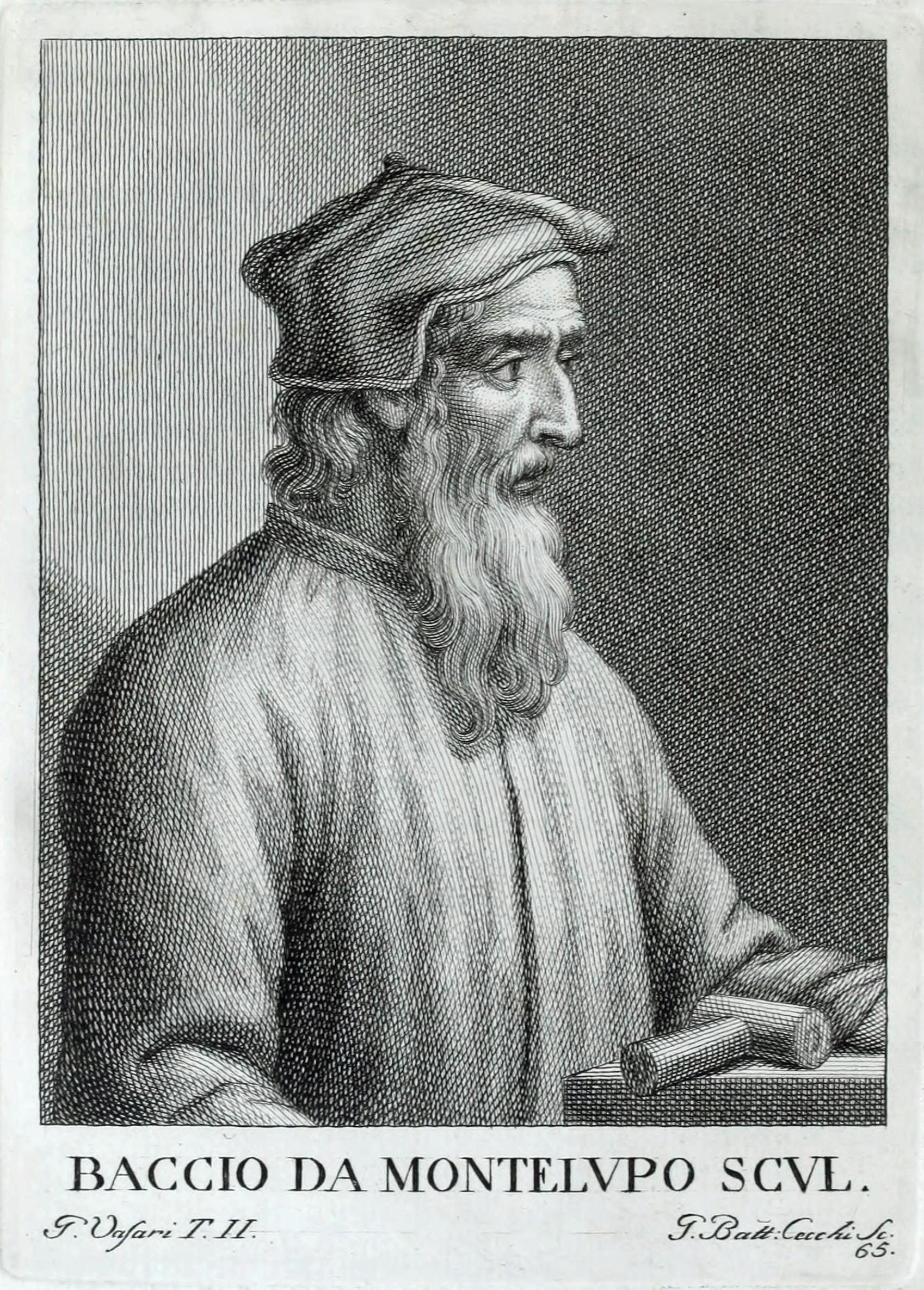
Baccio da Montelupo

Baccio da Montelupo (Italian: [ˈbattʃo da ˌ(m)monteˈluːpo]; born Bartolomeo di Giovanni d'Astore dei Sinibaldi; 1469–1523?), was a sculptor of the Italian Renaissance. He was the father of another Italian sculptor, Raffaello da Montelupo. Both father and son are profiled in Vasari's Lives of the Most Excellent Painters, Sculptors, and Architects.

== Life ==
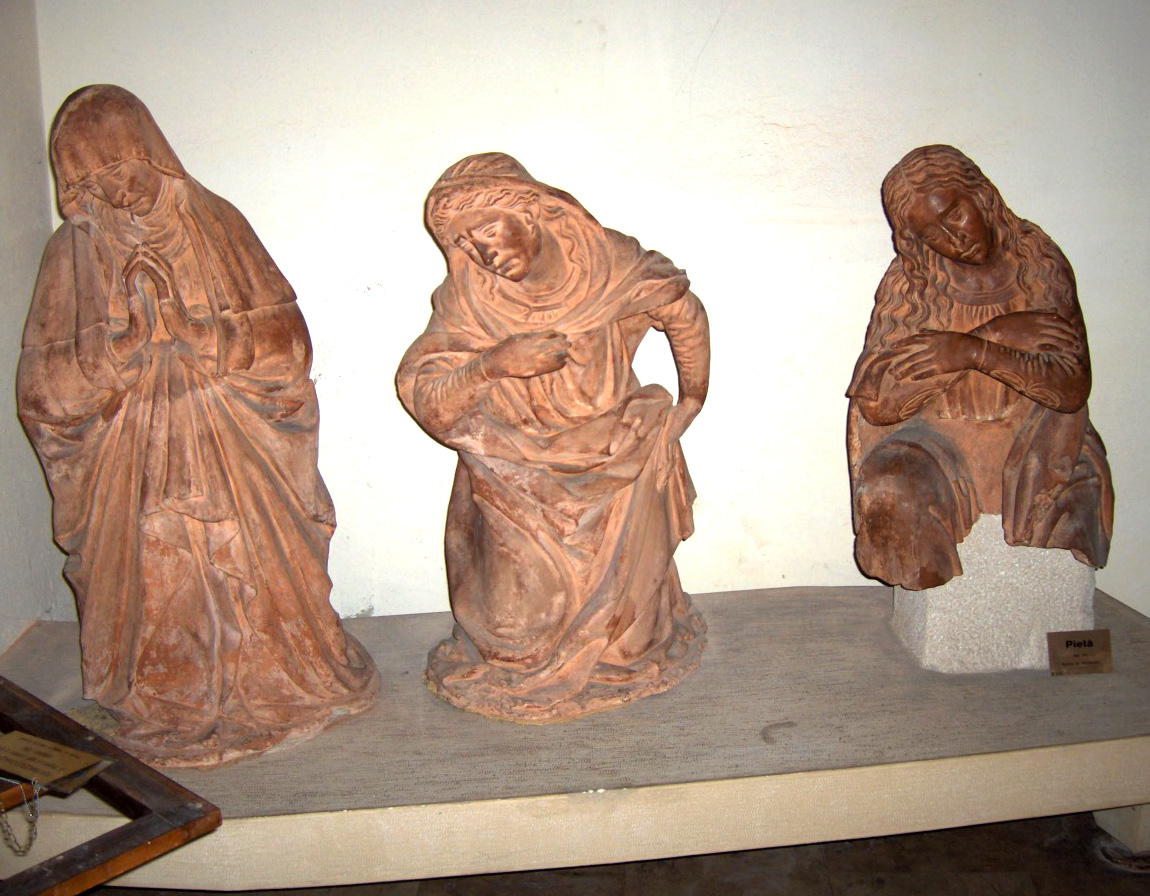
Compianto in terracotta, Basilica of San Domenico, Bologna

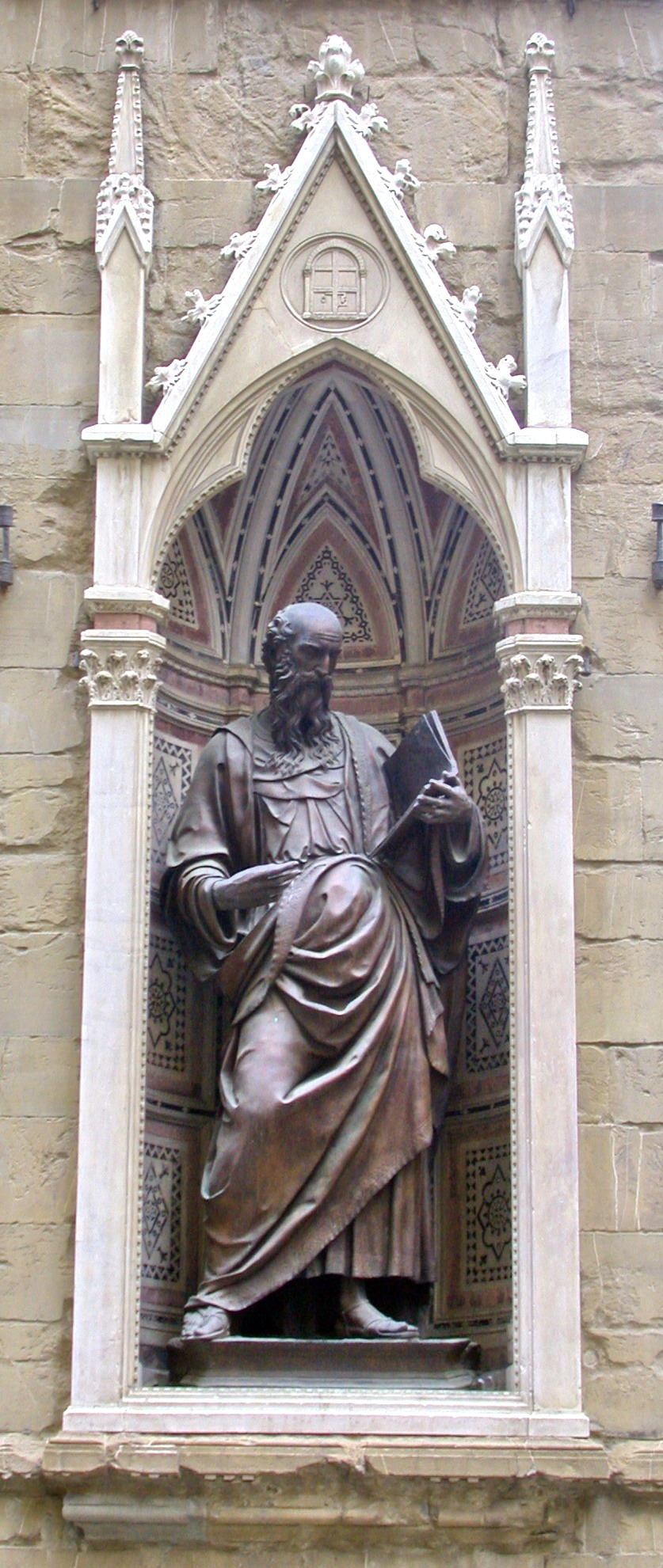
Saint John the Evangelist, Orsanmichele, Florence

Born into a family of modest social conditions in Montelupo Fiorentino, he moved at eighteen to Florence and pursued the study of sculpture, attending the school of Bertoldo di Giovanni, founded in the gardens of Lorenzo de' Medici and attended by other young sculptors including Michelangelo, Giovanni Francesco Rustici, and Jacopo Sansovino.

Baccio received his first important commission from the friars of the Basilica of San Domenico in Bologna, for a Compianto (lamentation scene), a series of terracotta statues (c. 1495). He then returned to Florence where he created several wooden Crucifixes: at the Basilica di San Lorenzo and San Marco, both in Florence, the Badia di SS. Flora e Lucilla in nearby Arezzo, and the church of San Martino in the Florentine municipality of Lastra a Signa.

In Bologna, Baccio created 12 busts of the Apostles in terracotta (now in the Ferrara Cathedral).

In 1506, Baccio received a commission for several sculptures for the Benedictine abbey of San Godenzo, of which today only the San Sebastiano survives.

The crowning moment of his career perhaps came with the commission in 1514 from a competition sponsored by the Florence silk merchants guild to create a statue in bronze for one of the remaining empty niches on the facade of Orsanmichele. Vasari writes:

It is said that when he had made the figure in clay, all who saw the arrangement of the armatures, and the moulds laid upon them, held it to be a beautiful piece of work, recognizing the rare ingenuity of Baccio in such an enterprise; and when they had seen it cast with the utmost facility, they gave Baccio credit for having shown supreme mastery, and having made a solid and beautiful casting. These labors endured in that profession, brought him the name of a good and even excellent master; and that figure is esteemed more than ever at the present day by all craftsmen, who hold it to be most beautiful.

Baccio's bronze St. John the Evangelist took its place on the exterior of Orsanmichele beside works by Italian notables of the preceding century: Donatello, Lorenzo Ghiberti, and Nanni di Banco.

In 1515, he created a marble edicola surrounding a fresco of the Virgin Mary in the church of Sant'Agostino at Colle di Val d'Elsa. Toward the end of the decade, he worked primarily in the area of Lucca, completing a marble Pietà for the church of Segromigno (1518). He then worked on a series of funeral monuments including Tomba del vescovo Silvestro Gigli (San Michele in Foro in Lucca, with his son Raffaello; Monumento di San Silao (now at Museo di Villa Guinigi, Lucca); and Monumento a Giano Grillo (Santa Maria dei Servi, Bologna).

Baccio died around 1523, in Lucca.
