= Evelyn Rosenberg =

American artist

- Born: 1948 (age 76–77)
- Known for: Sculpture

Evelyn Rosenberg is a New Mexico-based sculptor.

== Biography ==
After studying art and printmaking in the United States, Israel, and England, she pioneered the technique known as detonography. This technique involves sandwiching metal sheets between explosives and a clay mold to create an intricate, bas-relief sculpture. Rosenberg describes the work as "a very feminine technique because it's like having a child. You have these messy, destructive, painful, horrible things happening, and then you get these beautiful delicate objects."

Rosenberg has over 40 pieces of public art in the United States. Her work can be found as far afield as Tanzania, where it is displayed at the Serengeti National Park. She has been featured on many national news programs and publications, including Smithsonian magazine, NPR, the Today show, a Nightline special on five outstanding creative Americans, and international programs on the BBC and Russian, Japanese, and Chinese television.

In 2007, Rosenberg received the New Mexico's Governor's award for Excellence in the Arts.
