= Raffaello da Montelupo =

Italian sculptor (c. 1504 – c. 1566)

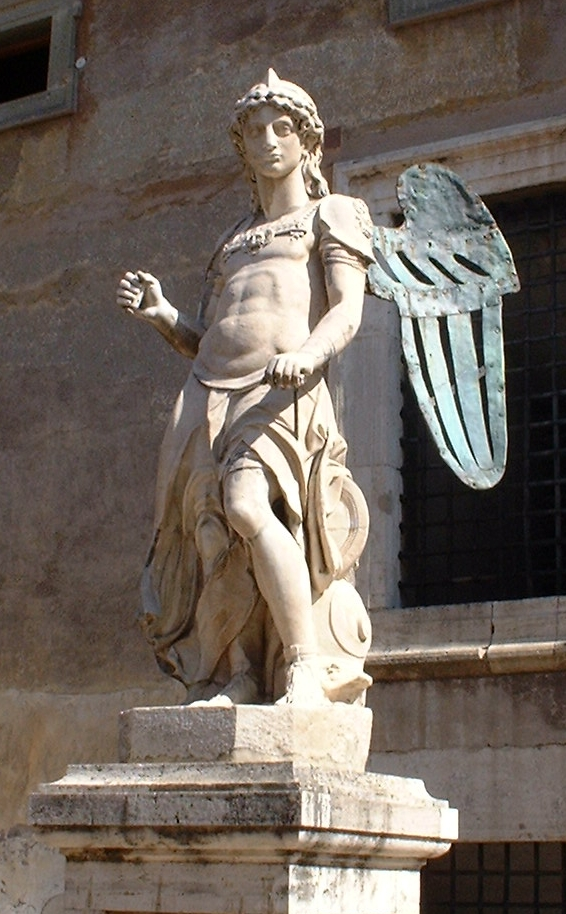
Angel by Raffaello da Montelupo (1504–1566). Used to stand on top of the castel Sant'Angelo (Rome), now in the "Angel Hall".

Raffaello da Montelupo (born Raffaele Sinibaldi; c. 1504/1505 – c. 1566/1567) was a sculptor and architect of the Italian Renaissance, and an apprentice of Michelangelo. He was the son of another Italian sculptor, Baccio da Montelupo. Both father and son are profiled in Vasari's Lives of the Most Excellent Painters, Sculptors, and Architects.

== Works ==
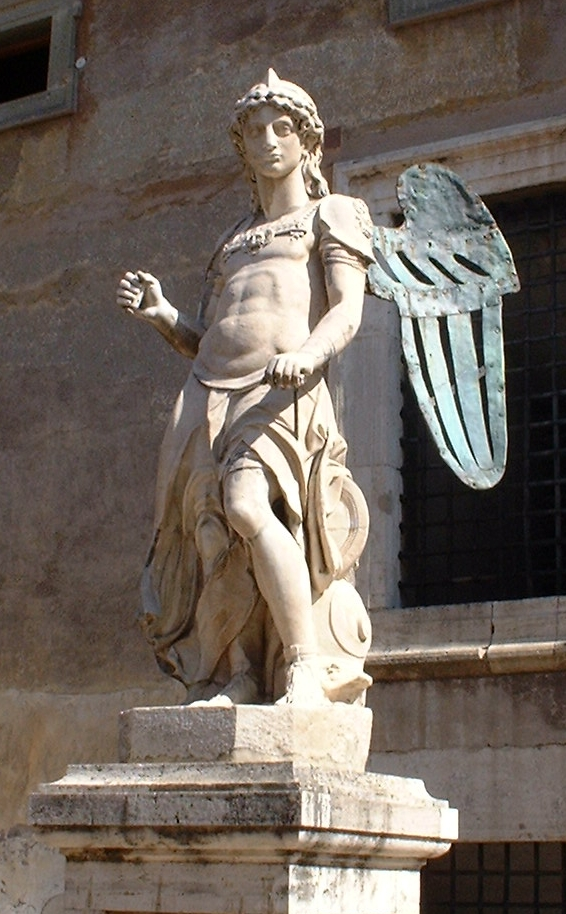
Saint Michael (c. 1536) for the top of Castel Sant'Angelo, Rome.

Raffaello was born in Montelupo Fiorentino, near Florence.

As a young artist in his twenties, he assisted Lorenzetto in Rome with the execution of statues of Elijah and Jonah for the Chigi Chapel in Santa Maria del Popolo (on designs by Raphael). He is also attributed a marble relief of the mystical marriage of St. Catherine (c. 1530), in a chapel at Santa Maria della Consolazione.

Raffaello then went to Loreto, where the Visitazione and Adorazione dei Magi (c. 1534) at the Basilica of the Holy House (Chiesa della Casa Santa) are attributed to him (on designs by Andrea Sansovino).

Shortly thereafter, according to Vasari, Raffaello began work in Florence with Michelangelo, at the Medici Chapel of the Basilica di San Lorenzo, for which he sculpted Saint Damian (c. 1534). Saint Cosmas is also attributed to him, together with Giovanni Angelo Montorsoli, another assistant to Michelangelo.

He returned to Rome, continuing to work as a sculptor under the direction of Michelangelo. There he contributed to work on the tomb of Pope Julius II at San Pietro in Vincoli, and contributed (along with Baccio Bandinelli) to the tomb of Pope Leo X at Santa Maria sopra Minerva.

For the chapel constructed by Leo X at the fortress of Castel Sant'Angelo, Raffaello created a Madonna. In addition, he sculpted a marble statue of Saint Michael holding his sword, designed to stand atop the Castel. (Legend holds that in 590 the Archangel appeared atop what was then the mausoleum of Hadrian, sheathing his sword as a sign of the end of the Roman plague, thus lending the fortress its present name). Raffaello's St. Michael was later replaced by a bronze statue of the same subject, executed by Flemish sculptor Peter Anton von Verschaffelt in 1753. His version may still be seen in an open court in the interior of the fortress.

Under Pope Paul III, Raffaello was commissioned to create fourteen angels to adorn Ponte Sant'Angelo, the bridge connecting Rome's center to the Castel Sant'Angelo. Those sculptures were later replaced under a commission by Pope Clement IX in 1669 for new angels by Bernini.

Raffaello da Montelupo also worked as an architect and, among other projects, made both sculptural and architectural contributions to the Duomo in the Umbrian town of Orvieto, where he retired and later died in 1566/1567. Vasari summed up Raffaello da Montelupo as follows:

I believe that Raffaello, if he had undertaken great works, as he might have done, would have executed more things in art, and better, than he did. But he was too kindly and considerate, avoiding all conflict, and contenting himself with that wherewith fortune had provided him; and thus he neglected many opportunities of making works of distinction. Raffaello was a very masterly draughtsman, and he had a much better knowledge of all matters of art that had been shown by his father Baccio.

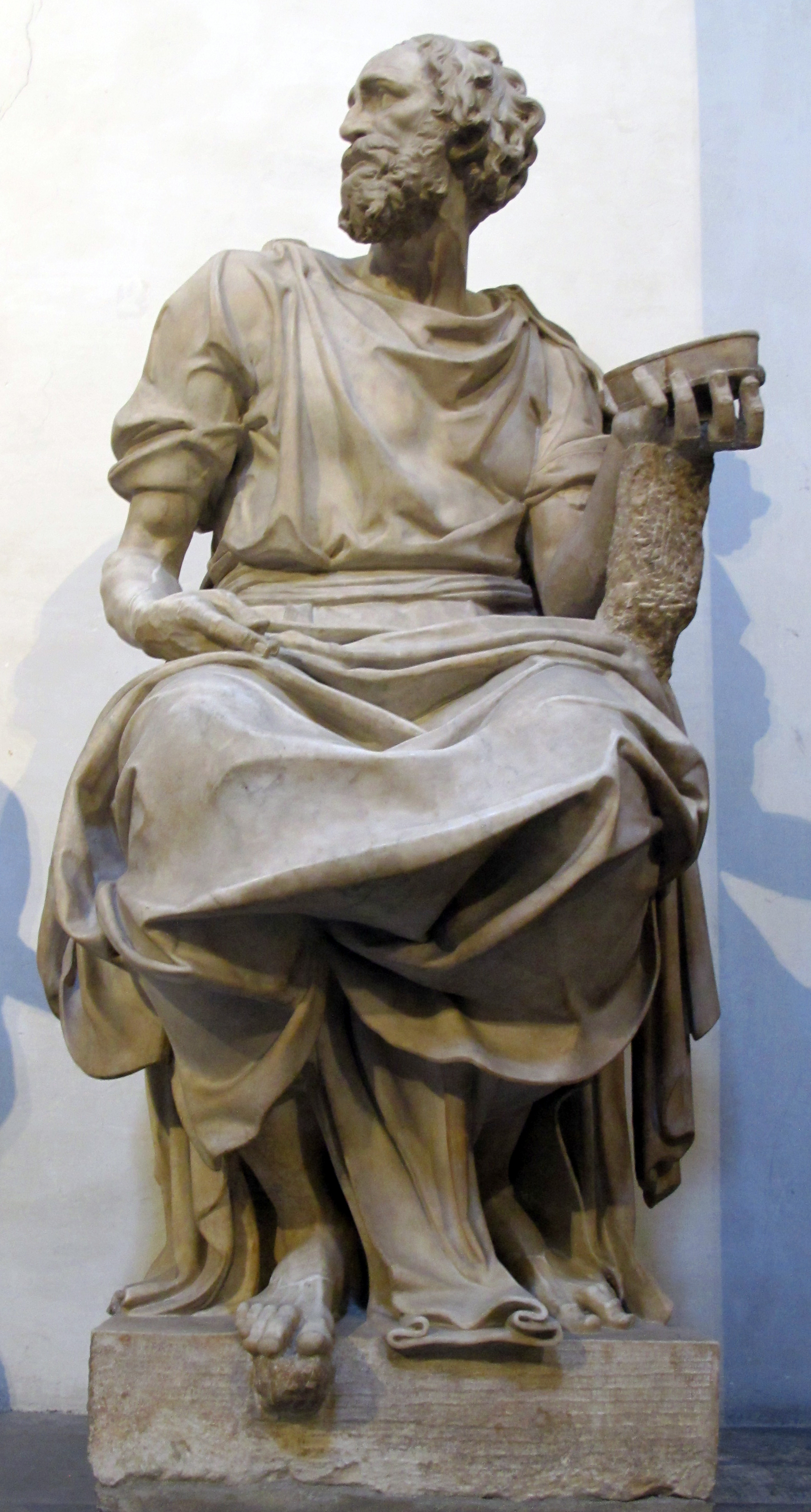
San Damiano (circa 1534), created for the New Sacristy of the Basilica di San Lorenzo in Florence.

== Autobiography ==
In the 1560s, Raffaello wrote something of a partial autobiography, recounting episodes from his youth, the sack of Rome in 1527 by the army of Charles V, Holy Roman Emperor, and Montelupo's work as a budding artist and sculptor during this period. A passing mention in his autobiography—by way of describing the use of his left hand in drawing and writing—is the only known contemporary reference to the apparent natural left-handedness of his teacher Michelangelo:

I will not omit to say that by nature I am left-handed, and, finding that hand more facile than the right one, I used to write with it, since my teacher did not mind, being satisfied that my handwriting was good. I have therefore always used the left hand, be it for writing, be it for drawing some designs from the Morgante, which was used for reading at school. From the moment that I held the sheet lengthwise, in order to write with the left hand, many were astonished, thinking that I wrote "all'ebraica" ["Hebrew-style", i.e. right-to-left] and that [my writing] could not be read later. . . . As I have already said, I draw better with the left hand, and once when I found myself drawing the "Arco di Trasi al Colosseo" [the Arch of Constantine], Michelangelo and Sebastiano del Piombo passed by and stopped to watch me. It should be prefaced that both of them, though naturally left-handed, did everything with their right hand, except actions requiring force. So they stayed a long time to watch me with great wonder, because, as far as is known, the two of them never made anything with their left [hand].
