= Saint John the Evangelist (Baccio da Montelupo) =

Sculpture by Baccio da Montelupo

Coordinates: 43°46′36″N 11°15′30″E

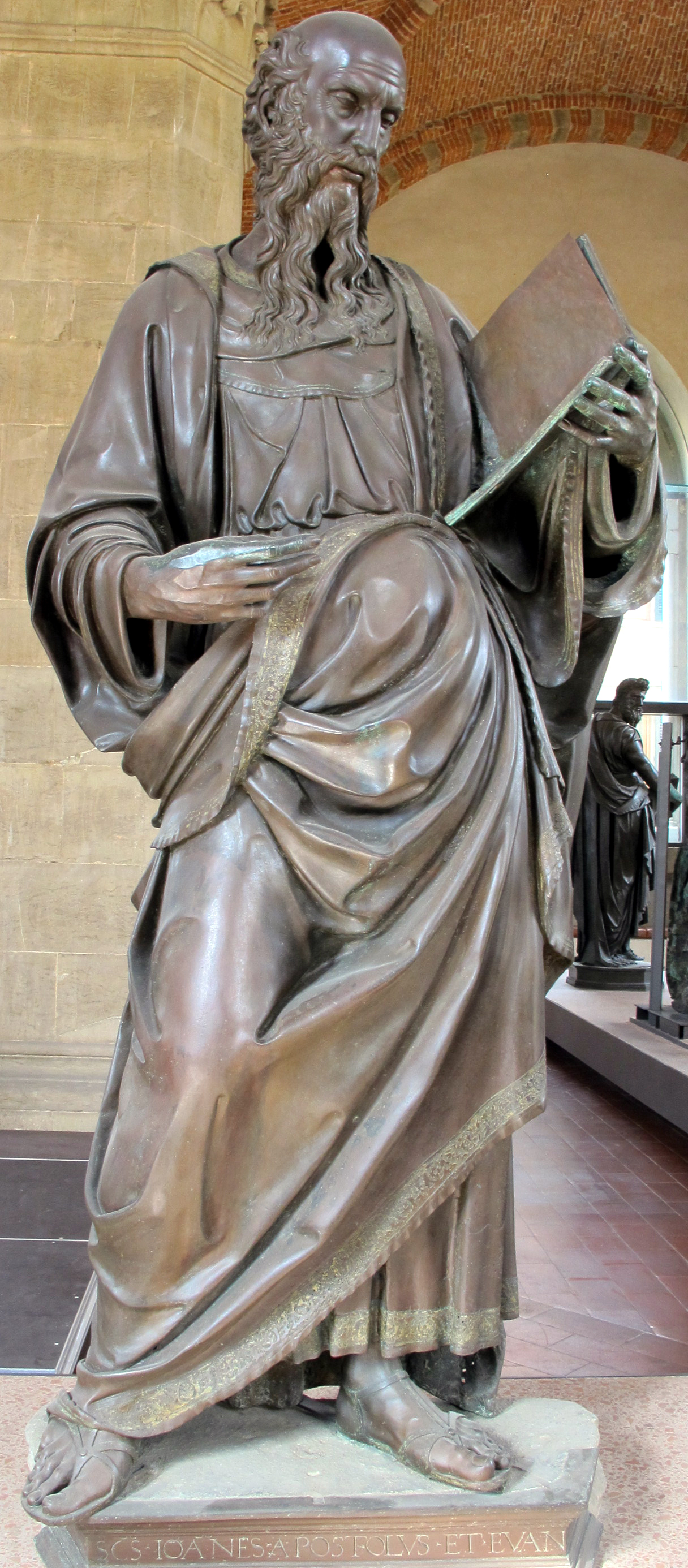

Saint John the Evangelist is a 2.66 m (8.7 feet) high bronze statue of John the Evangelist by Baccio da Montelupo, completed in 1515. It was commissioned by the Arte della Seta as part of a cycle of fourteen sculptures for the external niches of Orsanmichele, each showing the patron saint of one of the guilds of Florence. It is now in the Museo di Orsanmichele, although a replica fills its original niche.

== Bibliography ==
- (in Italian) Paola Grifoni, Francesca Nannelli, Le statue dei santi protettori delle arti fiorentine e il Museo di Orsanmichele, Quaderni del servizio educativo, Edizioni Polistampa, Firenze 2006.
