= Elijah (Lorenzetto) =

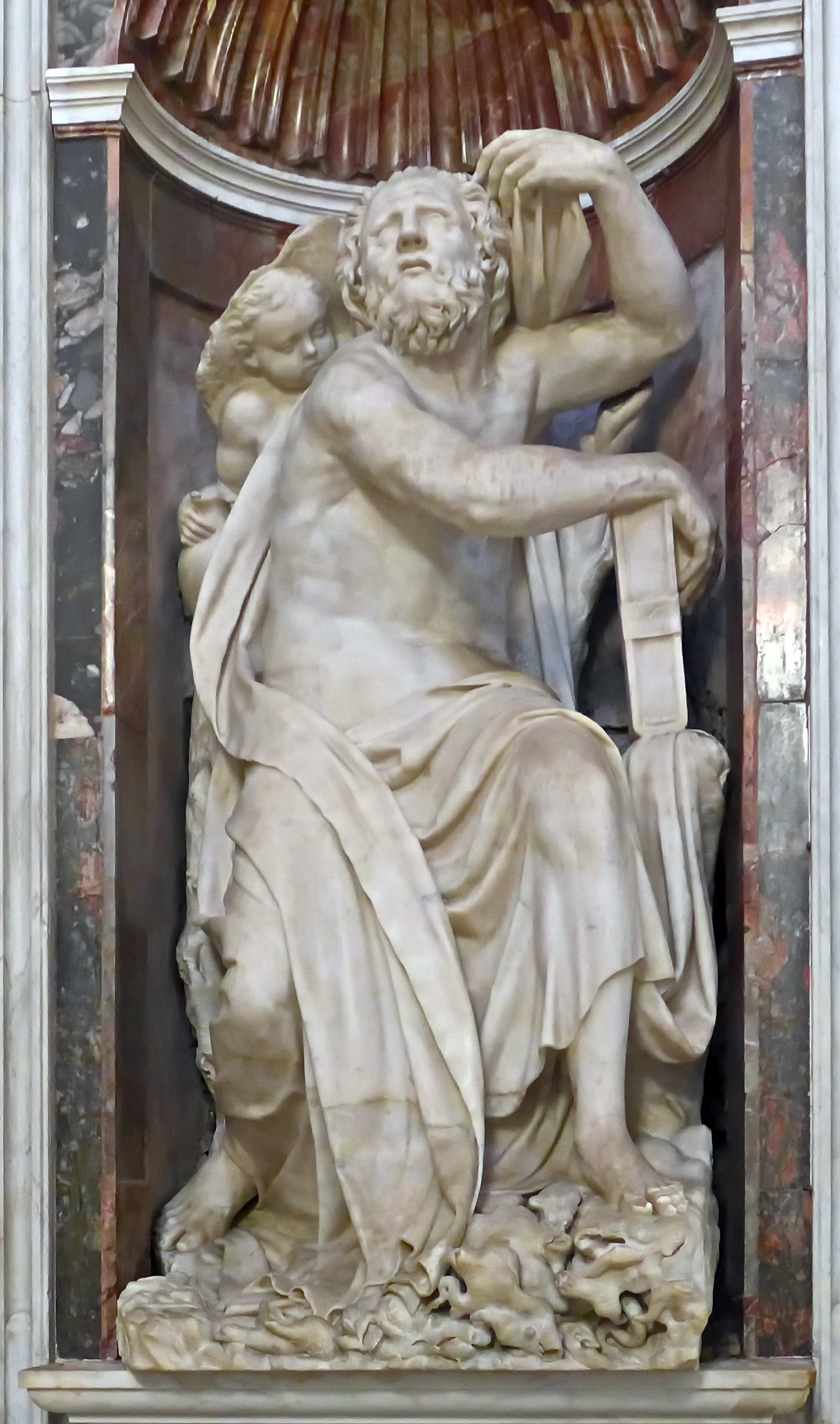
- Artist: Lorenzetto, Raffaello da Montelupo (based on a design by Raphael)
- Year: c. 1520-1524
- Type: Statue
- Location: Chigi Chapel; Rome

The statue of Elijah is a marble statue by the Italian Renaissance sculptor Lorenzetto in the niche to the right of the entrance in the Chigi Chapel, the Basilica of Santa Maria del Popolo, Rome. The sculptor followed the original designs of his mentor, Raphael, who was the architect of the chapel. The statue was finished by his pupil, Raffaello da Montelupo.

== History ==
The statue of Prophet Elijah was part of the original decorative scheme of the chapel by Raphael. The main iconographic themes in the funerary chapel of Agostino Chigi was resurrection and ascension of the soul to heaven. The two statues of Jonah and Elijah could be interpreted in this context: Prophet Jonah is the prototype of the Christ of the Resurrection, while Elijah of the Christ of the Ascension. In the Old Testament "Elijah went up by a whirlwind into heaven" on a chariot of fire (2 Kings 2:11). But Giorgio Vasari emphasized another aspect of Elijah's story in his description:

"...an Elijah, living by Grace, with his cruse of water and his bread baked in the ashes, under the juniper-tree."

Fabio Chigi repeated this in a letter. The statue was carved by Lorenzetto, Raphael's pupil, but unlike its counterpart, the statue of Jonah and the whale it was far from being finished at the time when Raphael died in 1520, and consequently the final version could be more removed from his original (lost) designs. A young assistant sculptor, Raffaello da Montelupo recorded in his autobiography that he completed the statue around 1523/24. Both the Jonah and the Elijah remained in Lorenzetto's workshop for a long time as Vasari records in his Lives.

Lorenzetto died in 1541 but ten years later, in 1552 Lorenzo Leone Chigi paid his debt towards the heirs of Lorenzetto, and the two statues were finally placed in the chapel. They were supposedly located on the two sides of the entrance, at least this was their recorded position when Fabio Chigi first visited the chapel in 1626. The statue of Elijah was on the left of the entrance then. Between 1652 and 1656 Gian Lorenzo Bernini restored the chapel, and created two new statues (Habakkuk and the Angel, Daniel and the Lion) to fill the remaining empty niches. At the time the statue of Elijah was moved to its present place on the right of the entrance.

== Description ==
The statue shows the prophet in the desert with an angel. The surroundings are carefully detailed especially the tangled roots and plants below the prophet's feet and the part of the tree which grows up behind. Elijah is depicted as a bearded older man with the usual attributes of the water-jug and a book. He is looking up towards the sky which means that he is gazing at the oculus of the dome where the figure of God appears.

There is a disagreement about the originally intended place of the statue. John Shearman thought that it was most likely planned for one of the two niches by the entrance which means that its present position is probably correct.
