= Detonography =

Detonography is a method for sculpting metal with plastic or other explosives. Essentially a form of giant printmaking, with the explosive acting as the stamping press, it was created by Evelyn Rosenberg in 1986 with the help of the engineers of New Mexico Institute of Mining and Technology in Socorro, New Mexico. The process can create complex surfaces with delicate etched designs, even welding dissimilar metals. The results are lightweight, durable indoor and out, and relatively Vandalproof. This process essentially embosses the metal, but with a raised image instead of a depressed one.

Rosenberg has produced more than 40 detonographic works for public buildings around the United States and abroad.

== See also ==
- Shaped charge
