= Jonah (Lorenzetto) =

Jonah and the whale
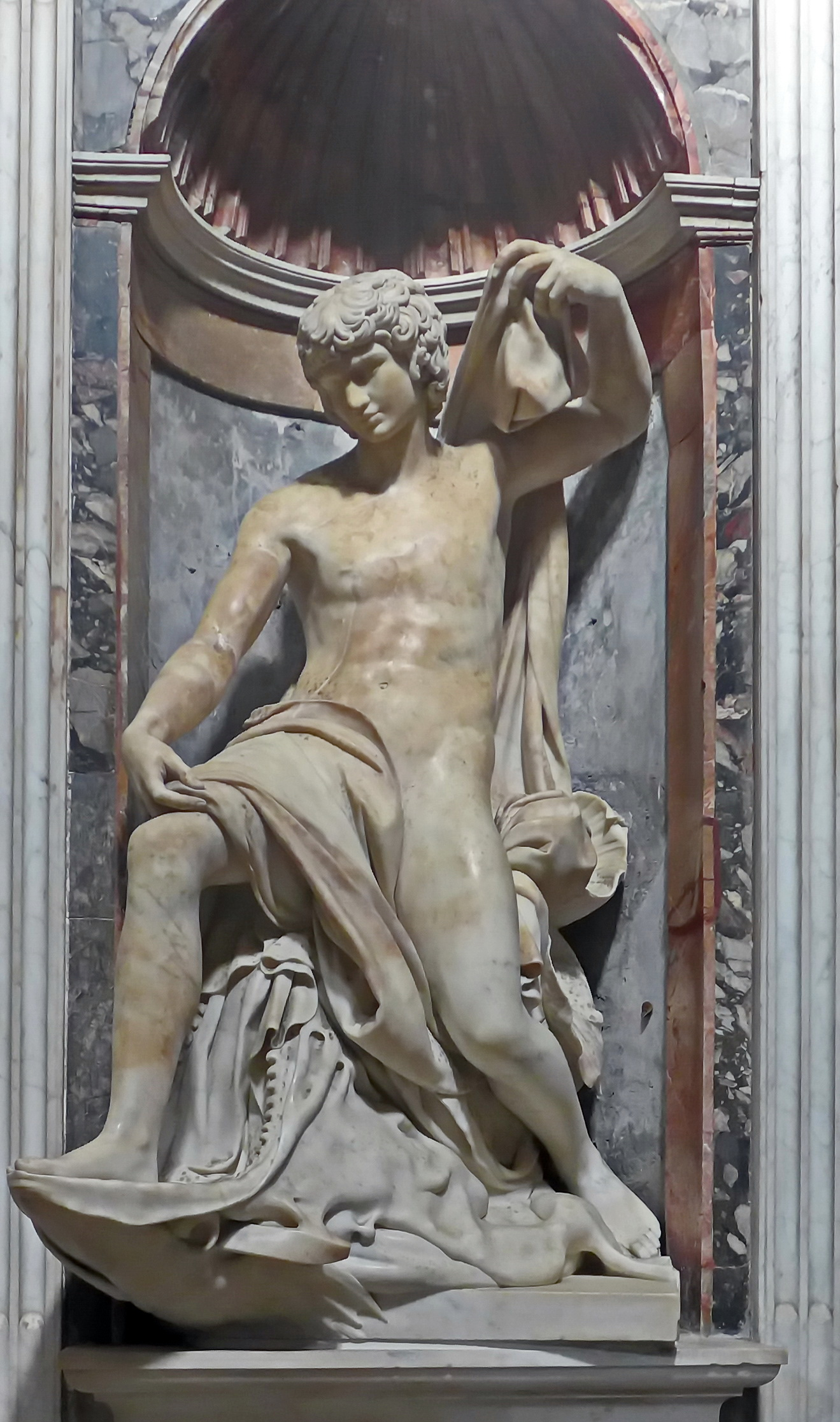
- Artists: Lorenzetto, based on a design by Raphael
- Year: 1520
- Type: Statue
- Location: Chigi Chapel, Rome

The statue of Jonah and the whale is an Italian Renaissance sculpture in marble by Lorenzetto in the niche to the left of the altar in the Chigi Chapel of the Basilica of Santa Maria del Popolo, Rome. The sculptor followed the original designs of his mentor, Raphael, who was the architect of the chapel. This is the only sculpture that Raphael himself designed and was executed according to his intentions.

== History ==
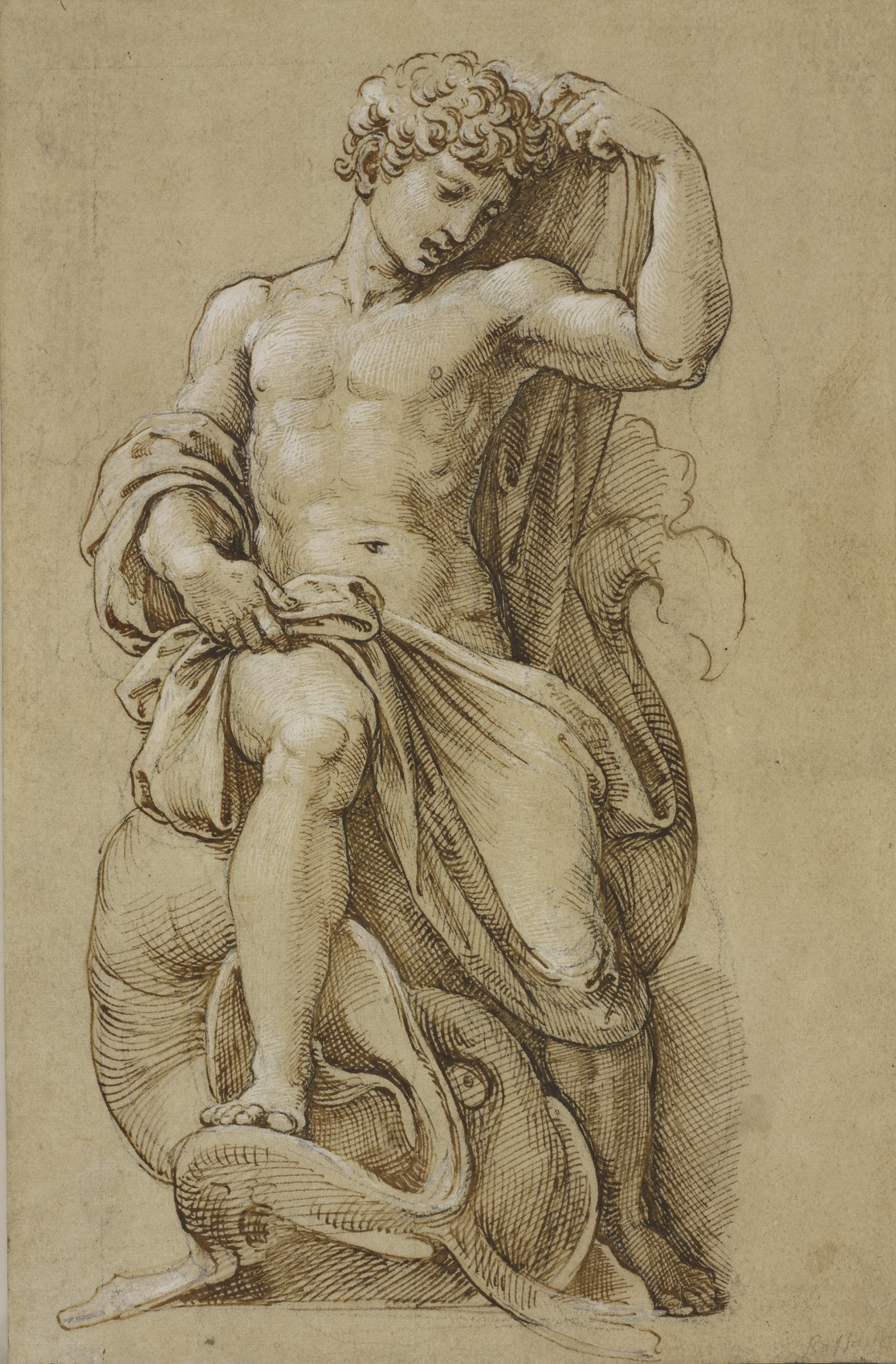
The statue of Jonah, drawing in the Royal Collection (c. 1520-23).

The statue of Prophet Jonah was part of the original decorative scheme of the chapel by Raphael. One of the main iconographic themes in the funerary chapel of Agostino Chigi was the resurrection of the dead. In this context the adventure of Jonah, who was swallowed by a large fish and spewed out three days later by the command of God, was a symbol of overcoming death. Jesus himself said that this miraculous episode in the Old Testament prefigured his own resurrection:

"For as Jonah was three days and three nights in the belly of a huge fish, so the Son of Man will be three days and three nights in the heart of the earth." — Gospel of Matthew 12:40

John Shearman assumed that the statue of Jonah was planned for the niche to the right of the altar because this place offered the best angle to view the composition. The statue was carved by Lorenzetto, Raphael's pupil, with assistance of the master, and he almost finished the work by 1520 when Agostino Chigi and Raphael died. Lorenzetto worked on this commission "with all the zeal, diligence, and labor in his power, in order to come out of it with credit and to give satisfaction to Raphael", as Vasari put it. Even so, the statue and its counterpart, the statue of Elijah remained in Lorenzetto's workshop. Vasari records in his Lives, speaking about the statues:

"... the heirs of Agostino, with scant respect, allowed these figures to remain in Lorenzetto's workshop where they stood for many years. [...] Lorenzo, robbed for those reasons of all hope, found for the present that he had thrown away his time and labor."

Lorenzetto died in 1541 but ten years later, in 1552 Lorenzo Leone Chigi paid his debt towards the heirs of Lorenzetto, and the two statues were finally placed in the chapel. They were supposedly located on the two sides of the entrance, at least this was their recorded position when Fabio Chigi first visited the chapel in 1626. Between 1652 and 1656 Gian Lorenzo Bernini restored the chapel, and created two new statues (Habakkuk and the Angel, Daniel and the Lion) to fill the still empty niches. At the time the statue of Jonah was moved to its present place on the left of the main altar.

== Description ==
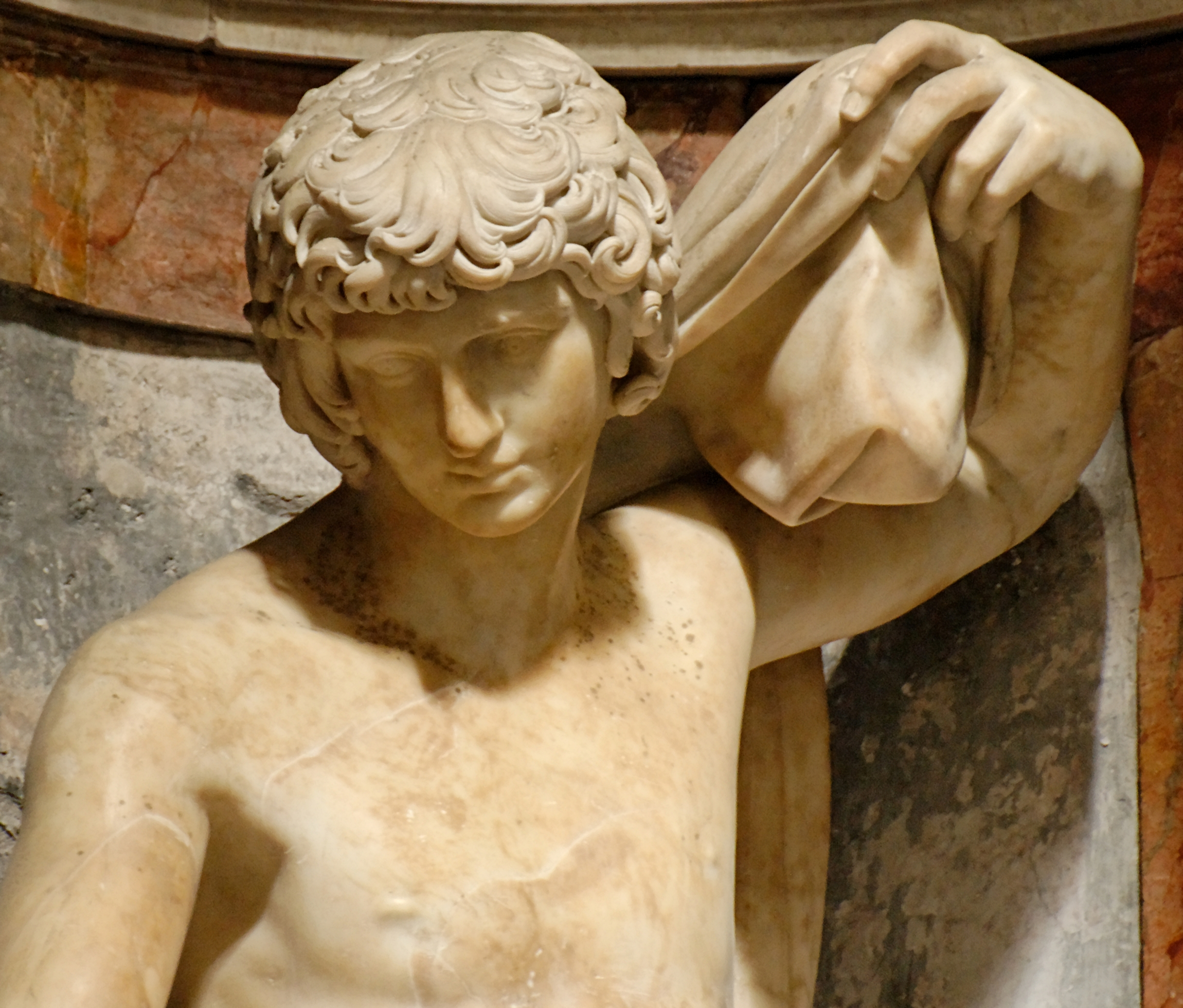
The head was inspired by the Antinous Farnese.

The statue was carved from marmor lunensis, antique Carrara marble, which has a delicate yellowish tone. The material has a high quality, and Pirro Ligorio claimed that the statue was carved from a block fallen from the Temple of Castor and Pollux, at the time thought to be the Temple of Jupiter Stator.

The figure of Jonah is nude and youthful, he is seated on the sea monster, with his right foot on its lower jaw, and with his left hand he holds a drapery above his head. His look and posture is triumphant. The present position of the statue is unfavourable, it was clearly intended to be seen from the left. The contemporary drawing in Windsor shows it from this angle. Another evidence is a tondo in the Vatican loggias which was probably painted after a sketch of Raphael. In its originally intended - but probably never occupied - position in the niche to the right of the altar the prophet would have been looking down towards the aperture of the crypt under the chapel in front of the altar (this opening in the floor was later walled up by Bernini), and faced the entering visitor.

At first Bernini planned to move the statue to its intended place as documented by a drawing in the Smith College Museum of Art but later he changed his mind, and gave this important niche to his own statue depicting Habakkuk.

The head of the statue may have been inspired by the famous Antinous Farnese, an ancient Roman statue of Antinous, the lover of Hadrian, who committed suicide in Egypt. This is another, although less obvious, allusion to Egypt in the chapel besides the pyramidal tombs and the lotus cymatium of the entrance arch.

The head of Jonah was first identified as an Antinous by the art historian Giovanni Pietro Bellori in 1695. It is unsure that Raphael and his circle identified the features as Antinous or they simply copied a beautiful antique head for the purpose of showing the youthful Jonah. In the middle of the 16th century there were at least 12 statues of Antinous in Roman collections but we have no certain information about the whereabouts of the Antinous Farnese in the 1510s.

== Criticism ==
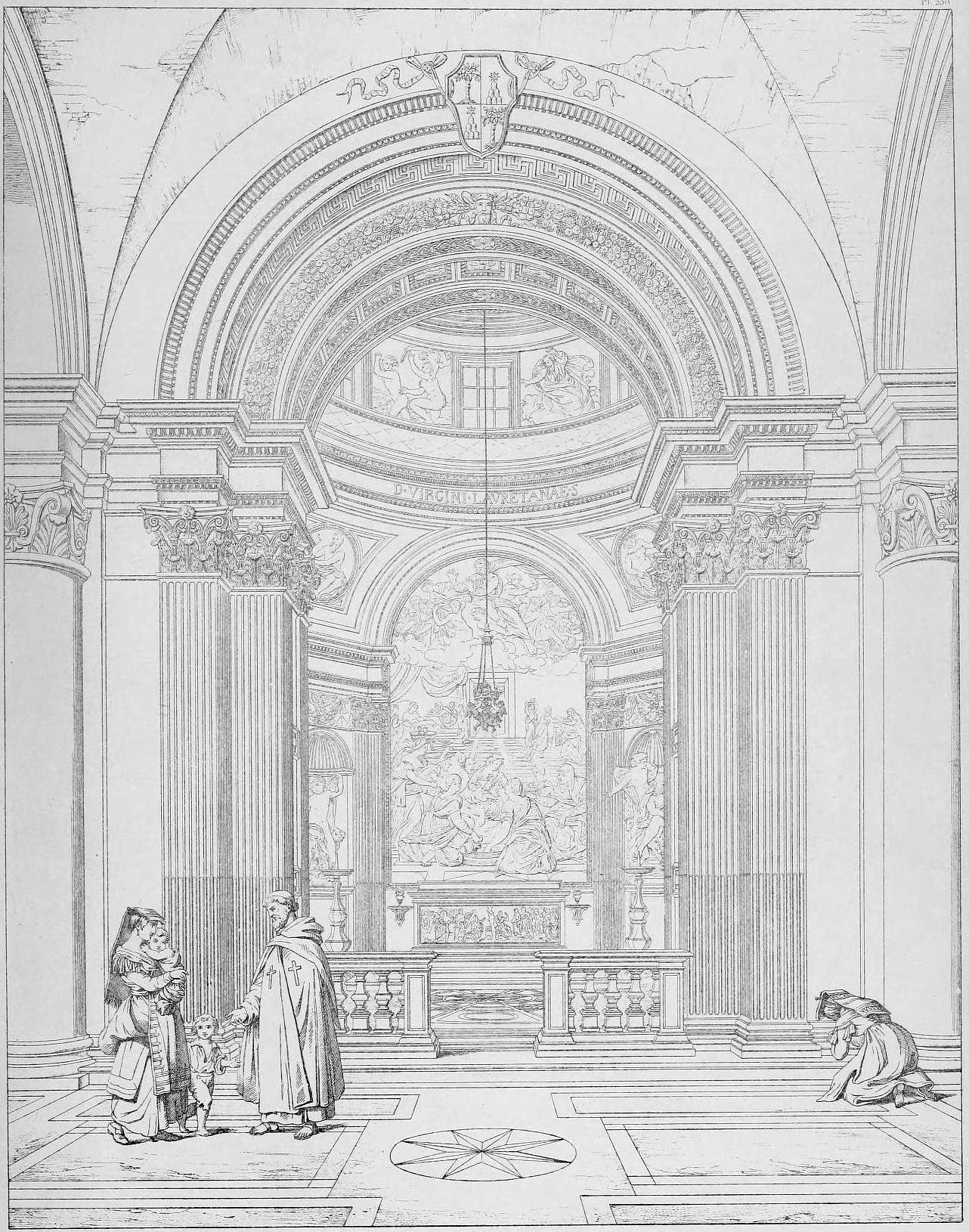
The chapel in the Romantic era, etching by Paul Letarouilly.

Giorgio Vasari praised Lorenzetto's effort: "he executed the figures to perfection", the biographer claimed, and "these statues, then, were brought to the most beautiful completion by Lorenzetto with all the art and diligence at his command". In the 19th century Joseph Archer Crowe was equally enthusiastic: "But in both these statues, and more particularly in the former [Jonah], youth and grace are combined with a certain Raphaelic elegance, there is more trace of the spirit of the antique than of the hand of Raphael".

John Pope-Hennessy was highly critical about Lorenzetto's skill in executing Raphael's design. The design "was blurred and weakened by the sculptor Lorenzetto. This is one of the few sculptures in the world whose true merits transpire more clearly from plastercasts than from the original", he wrote. John Shearman was less dismissive. "The two statues that Raphael designed for the chapel have never been given the attention they deserve (and they cannot get it here)", he observed.

== Literature ==
The great Swedish Romantic writer, Viktor Rydberg in his Roman Days (1877) recorded - or simply invented - an allegedly Roman tradition about the origin of the statue. As the story goes a man was wandering among the ruins of Hadrian's Villa in Tivoli when the spirit of Hadrian appeared before him in the night saying that his soul would not be able to rest until the good name of Antinous is cleared. The man bore the message to Raphael who was working on the Chigi Chapel, and he decided to christen Antinous and celebrate his beauty by immortalizing him as Prophet Jonah who also chose watery death to save a ship like Antinous, and came to see the light again. As Rydberg concluded:

"So was the heathen allegory knit with the Christian, and Jonah, under the pencil of Raphael became, not the aged, long-bearded prophet, clothed in a mantle, but the youthfully fair, nude pagan Antinous, now free from all pain, and rejoicing that life has vanquished death."
