= Lorenzetto =

Italian sculptor

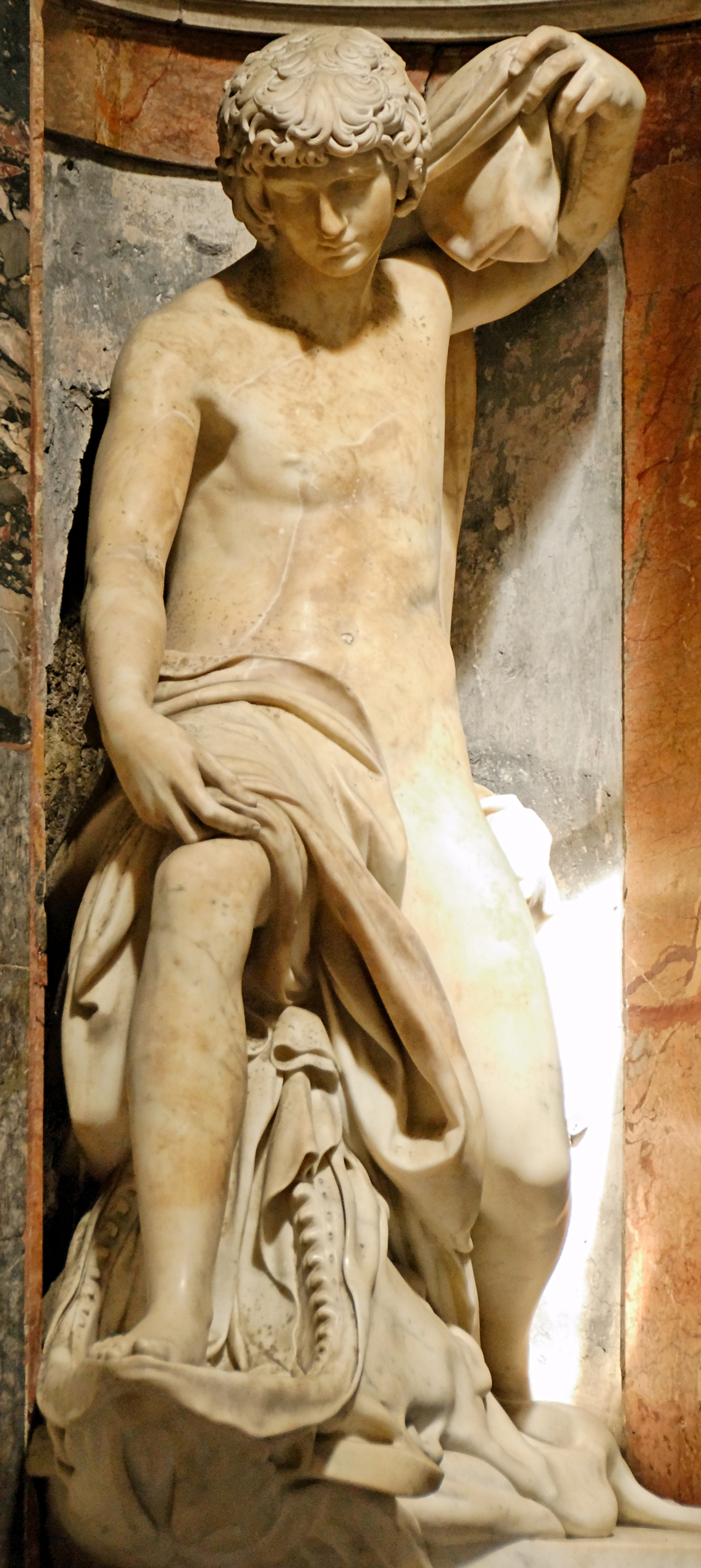
Jonah by Lorenzetto, Chigi Chapel, Santa Maria del Popolo.

Lorenzo di Lodovico di Guglielmo (1490–1541), known by the pseudonyms Lorenzo Lotti or Lorenzetto, was an Italian Renaissance sculptor and architect in the circle of Raphael.

He was born in Florence and married the sister of Giulio Romano, another painter, sculptor and pupil of Raphael. He is profiled in Vasari's Le Vite delle più eccellenti pittori, scultori, ed architettori (or, in English, Lives of the Most Excellent Painters, Sculptors, and Architects).

== Sculptural works ==
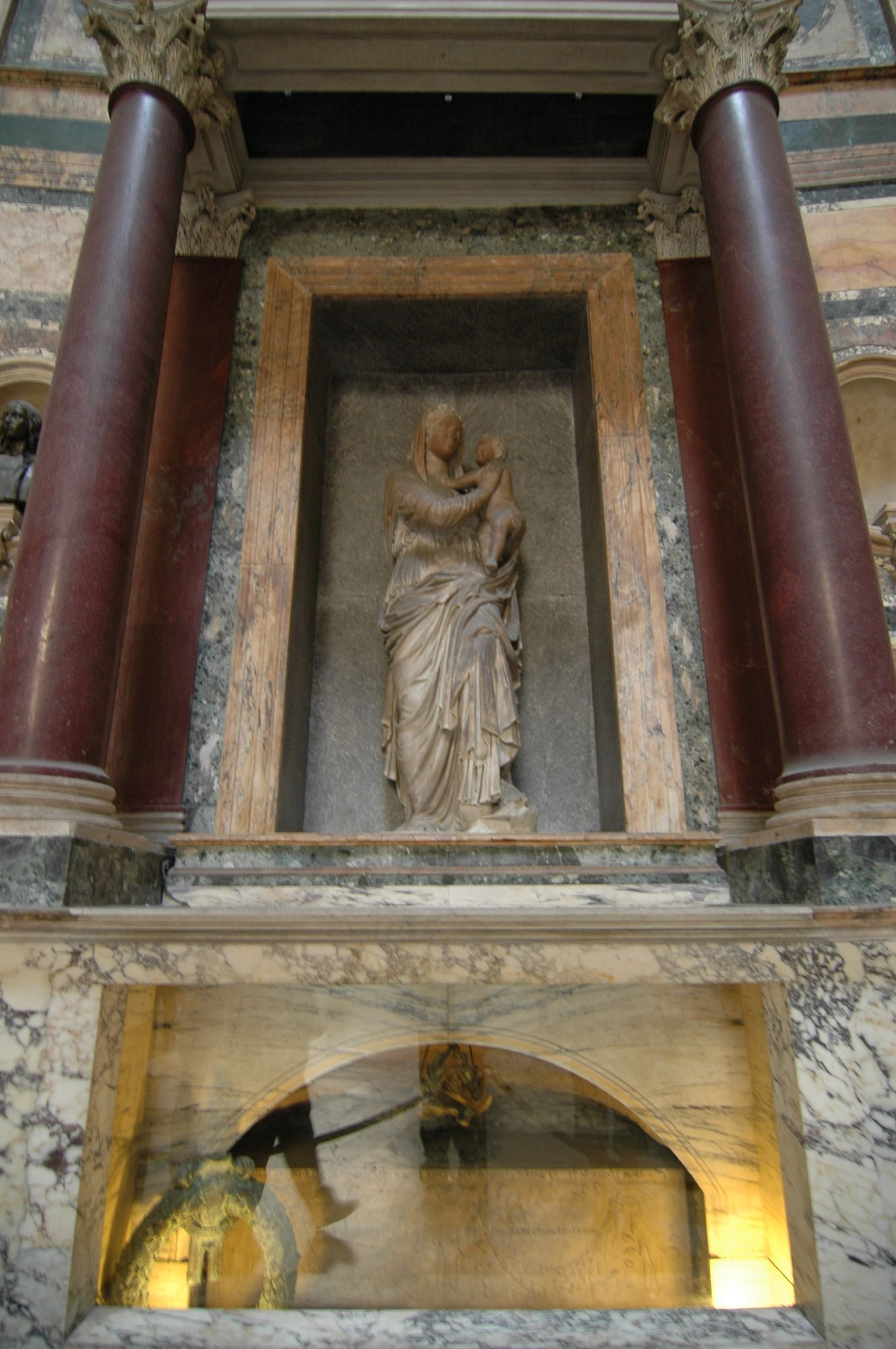
Madonna del Sasso, above the Tomb of Raphael, Pantheon, Rome

According to Vasari, as a young sculptor Lorenzetto completed the tomb of Cardinal Niccolò Forteguerri, begun by Andrea Verrocchio in 1477, in San Jacopo at Pistoia. Then in Rome, he made "many works" of which, according to Vasari, "there is no need to make any further record."

At the urging of Raphael, Lorenzetto received a commission from Agostino Chigi to create his tomb in Santa Maria del Popolo, where Agostino had built a chapel (Chigi Chapel). According to Vasari, Lorenzetto worked very hard on the project, both to impress Chigi and reflect well on Raphael. With assistance of the young sculptor Raffaello da Montelupo, and using designs by Raphael (according to Vasari), Lorenzetto created a statue of Elijah, living by the grace of God in the desert, and a nude Jonah delivered from the belly of the whale as a symbol of the resurrection from the dead. Lorenzetto was also assigned by Raphael to execute bronze reliefs for Agostino's tomb. The relief of Christ and the Women of Samaria was moved to the base of the altar by Bernini during later work on the Chapel.

According to Vasari, the almost simultaneous death of Chigi and Raphael (both within four days of the other in 1520) heralded a decline in Lorenzetto's fortunes. Chigi's heirs left Lorenzetto's statues for the Chigi Chapel sit in Lorenzetto's workshop "for many years" and Lorenzetto "robbed for those reasons of all hope, found for the present that he had thrown away his time and labor."

Lorenzetto did, however, find work creating a statue for Raphael's tomb in the Pantheon, assisted by Raffaello da Montelupo. Called the Madonna del Sasso (Madonna of the Rock), it is so named because Mary rests one foot on a boulder.

In 1524, Lorenzetto completed the tomb of poet Bernardino Cappella in Santo Stefano Rotondo (again with Raffaello da Montelupo).

By the time he worked on the tombs of the Medici popes (Clement VII and Leo X) in Santa Maria sopra Minerva (c. 1536) he apparently contented himself with a subordinate role, the primary statuary having been entrusted to Baccio Bandinelli.

== Work on St. Peter's ==
In his later years, Lorenzetto also assisted Antonio da Sangallo the Younger as an architect and surveyor for the never-ending work on St. Peter's Basilica under Pope Paul III. According to Vasari, this proved to be the most lucrative engagement of Lorenzetto's career because:

the walls were being built at a fixed price of so much for every four braccia. Thereupon Lorenzo, without exerting himself, in a few years became more famous and prosperous than he had been after many years of endless labor, through having found God, mankind, and Fortune all propitious at that one moment. And if he had lived longer, he would have done even more towards wiping out those injuries that a cruel fate had unjustly brought upon him during his best period of work.

Lorenzetto died in Rome in 1541 at age 47.
