= Giovanni Francesco Rustici =

Italian sculptor

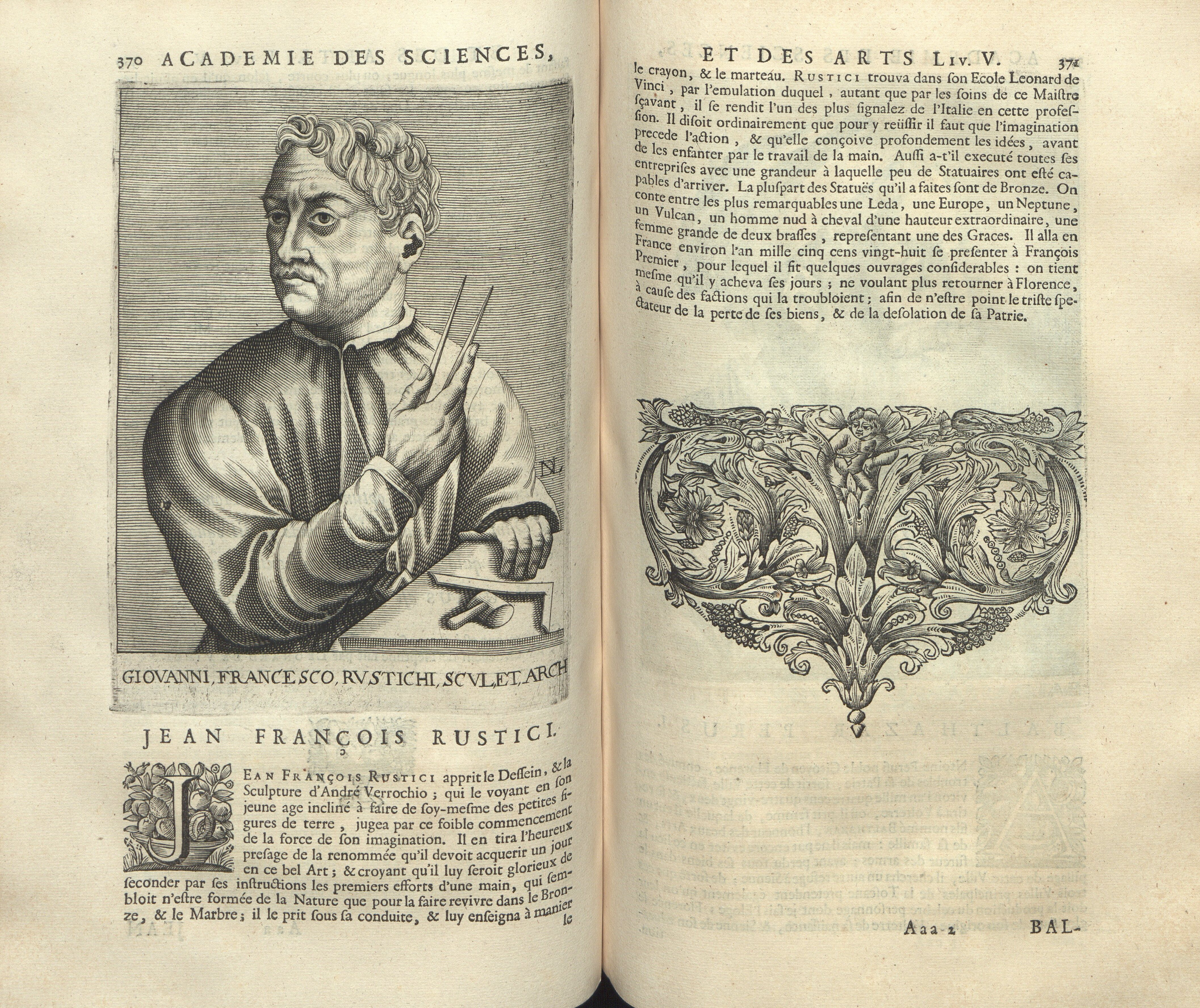
Giovan Francesco Rustici, as depicted in the 1682 edition of Academy of Sciences and Arts, containing the lives, and historical eulogies of illustrious men

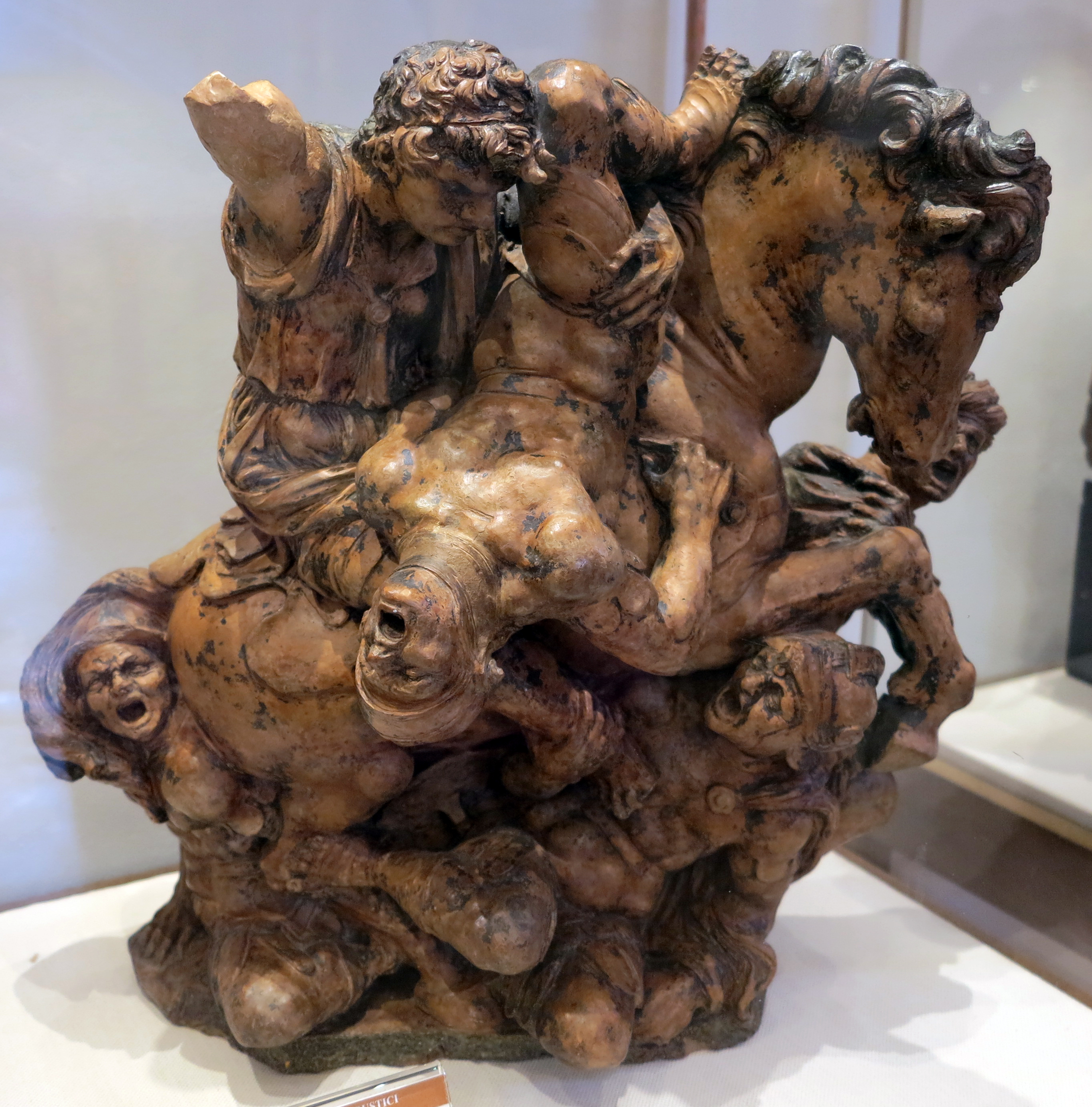
Anghiari Battle after Leonardo da Vinci, Bargello museum

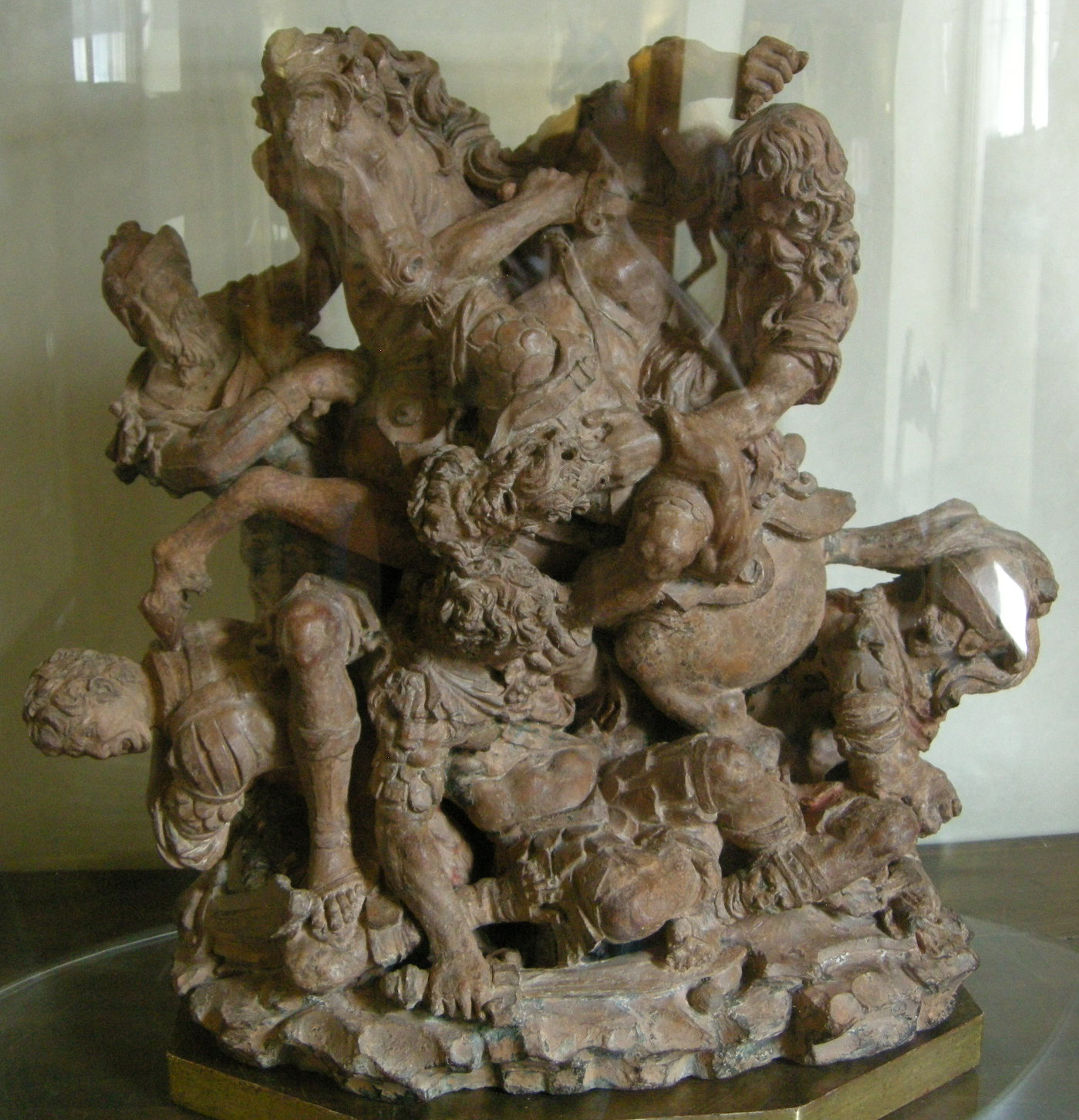
A Group of Warriors by Giovanni Francesco Rustici, Palazzo Vecchio

Giovan Francesco Rustici, or Giovanni Francesco Rustici, (1475–1554) was an Italian Renaissance painter and sculptor.

He was born into a noble family of Florence, with an independent income. Rustici profited from study of the Medici sculpture in the garden at San Marco, and according to Giorgio Vasari, Lorenzo de' Medici placed him in the studio of Verrocchio, and that after Verrocchio's departure for Venice, he placed himself with Leonardo da Vinci, who had also trained in Verocchio's workshop. He shared lodgings with Leonardo while he was working on the bronze figures for the Florence Baptistry, for which he was ill paid and resolved, according to Vasari, not to work again on a public commission. Moreover, an echo of Leonardo's inspiration is unmistakable in the much-discussed and much-reviled wax bust of "Flora" in Berlin, ascribed to a circle of Leonardo and most probably to Rustici. At this time, Pomponius Gauricus, in De sculptura (1504), named him one of the principal sculptors of Tuscany, the peer of Benedetto da Maiano, Andrea Sansovino and Michelangelo. It may have been made in France, perhaps in the circle of Rustici, who entered Francis I's service in 1528.

Vasari tells of the elaborate suppers given by Rustici and his comrades.

Rustici's Mercury was commissioned by Cardinal Giuliano de' Medici in 1515 as a fountain figure for the courtyard of Palazzo Medici in Florence. The figure blew a jet of water that spun a whirligig with four vanes in the form of butterfly wings, according to Giorgio Vasari's description. According to James Draper, Rustici's figure drew inspiration from the mid-fifteenth century gilt-bronze fountain Winged Infant now at the Metropolitan Museum of Art. Vasari praised the sculpture, now in the Boscawen collection at the Fitzwilliam Museum, Cambridge.

At the time of the siege of Florence, 1528, he went to France, where he was pensioned by King Francis I but after the king's death died in poverty at Tours.

Baccio Bandinelli apprenticed with Rustici.

Some glazed terracotta bas-reliefs in the technique familiar from the della Robbia workshops, are attributed to Rustici, notably a Madonna and Child in the Bargello and a Saint John the Baptist in the Museum of Fine Arts, Boston.

== Major works ==
- Bust of Boccaccio (1503) for Giovanni Boccaccio's funeral monument at Certaldo .
- John the Baptist with the Pharisee and the Levite. Three figures on the Baptistery, Florence. The work was commissioned in 1506 to replace Late Gothic figures by Tino da Camaino.
- Mercury taking Flight. Commissioned by Cardinal Giulio de' Medici (later Pope Clement VII), to decorate a fountain in the garden court of Palazzo Medici, Florence, probably in 1515. It was probably installed above the fountain bowl that originally held Donatello's 'Judith'.
- The Infant Jesus and Saint John the Baptist. Bas-relief marble and onyx tondo. Louvre Museum.
- Virgin and Child Bas-relief bronze plaque, attributed to Rustici. Louvre Museum.
- Battle scene. Terracotta. A horseman and four assailants, showing the influence of Leonardo's drawings. Louvre Museum.
- Fountain, the design attributed to Leonardo. Formerly at Woolbeding House, Surrey (Victoria and Albert Museum)
