= Cybo-Soderini Chapel =

Chapel in the church of Santa Maria del Popolo, Rome

- Cappella Cybo-Soderini
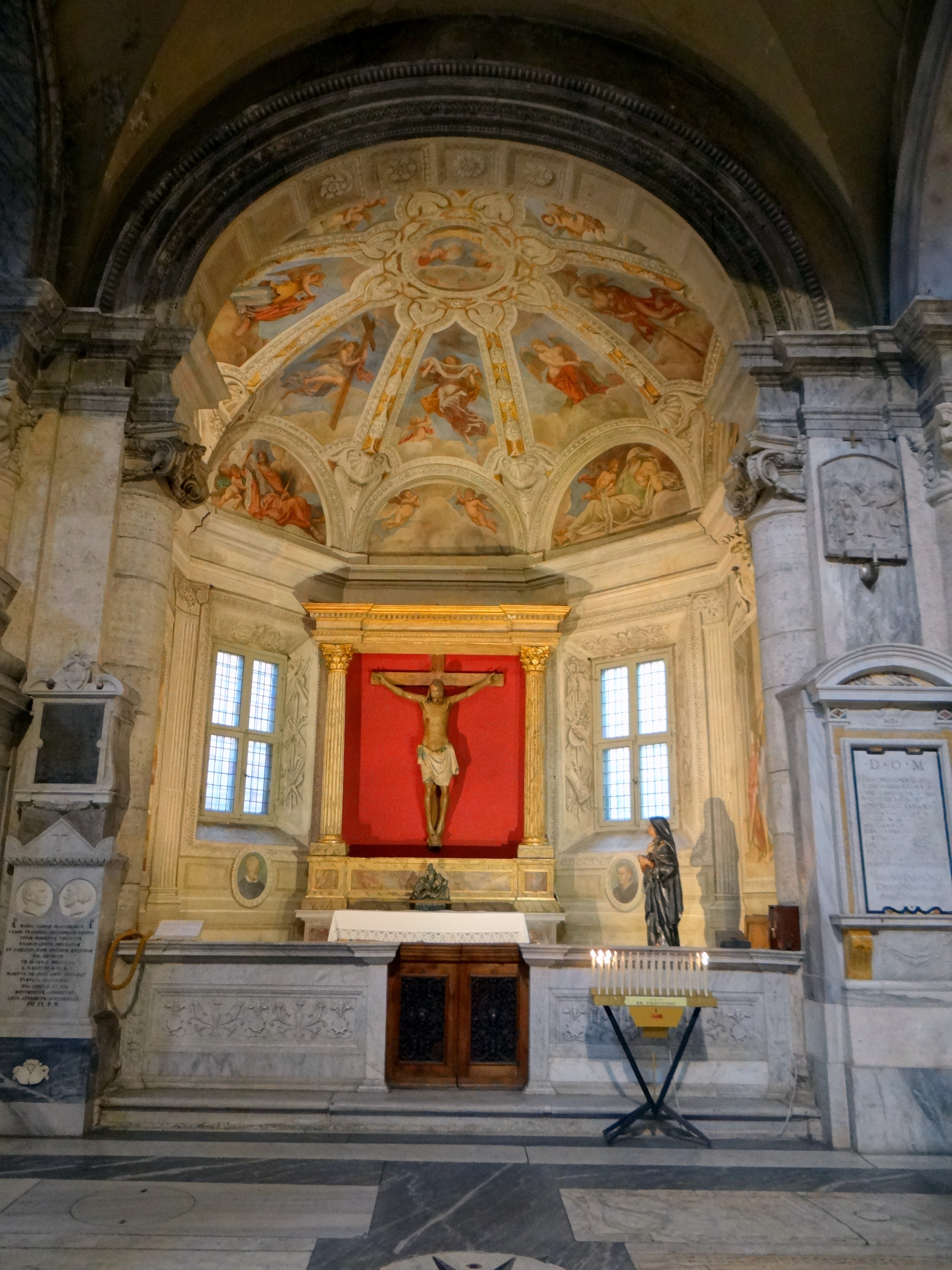

Religion
- Affiliation: Catholicism
- Status: funerary chapel

Location
- Location: Basilica of Santa Maria del Popolo, Rome
- Interactive map of Cybo-Soderini Chapel
- Coordinates: 41.911389°N 12.476389°E

Architecture
- Type: hexagonal chapel
- Style: Baroque
- Founder: Teodorina Cybo, Innocenzo Cybo
- Completed: 1636

The Cybo-Soderini Chapel (Italian: Cappella Cybo-Soderini) or the Chapel of the Crucifixion (Italian: Cappella del Crocifisso) is a side chapel of the Basilica of Santa Maria del Popolo, Rome. Its most important works of art are the frescos of a Flemish artist, Pieter van Lint from c. 1636-37.

== History ==
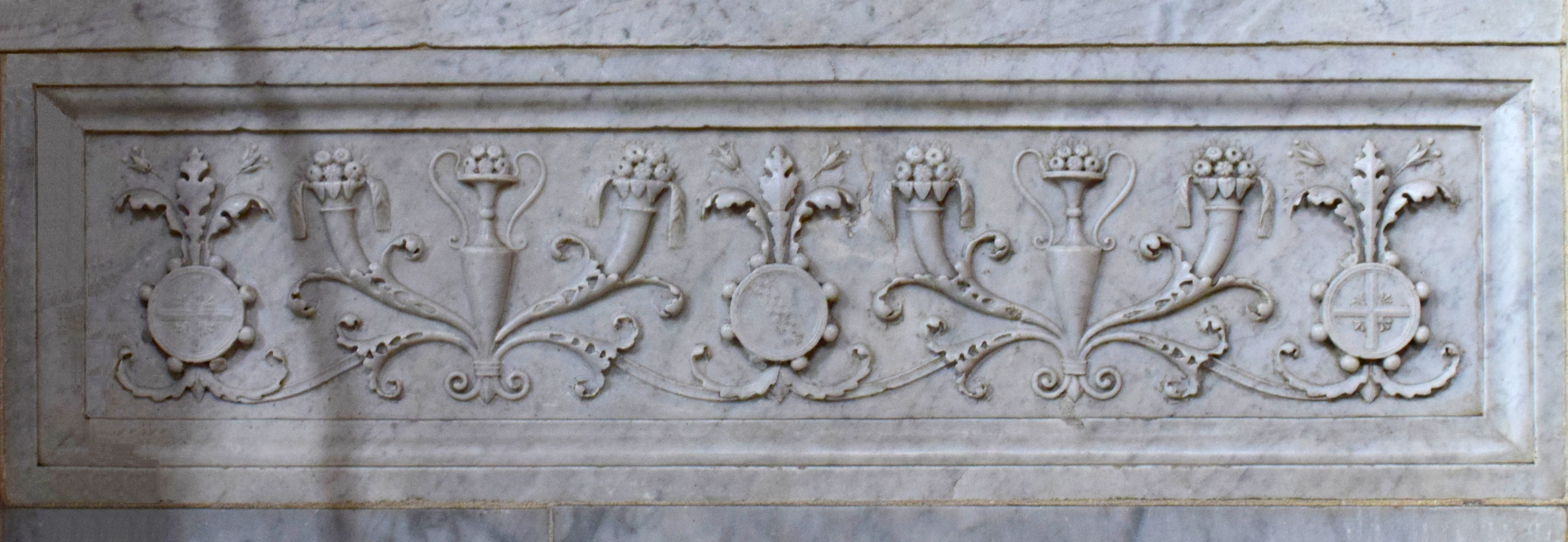
Middle panel of the Renaissance transenna with the Cybo symbols (cross, bend chequy); c. 1480s

According to 16th-century archival sources the chapel was founded by Teodorina Cybo (c. 1455-1508), the natural daughter of Pope Innocent VIII. She was married to a Genovese gentleman, Gherardo Usodimare who was appointed depositario generale (treasurer) of the papal court. The concession document of the chapel has not been preserved but it was probably granted during the Cybo papacy when another side chapel in the basilica was acquired by Cardinal Lorenzo Cybo de Mari, the pope's favourite nephew. In 1499 Gherardo Usodimare died suddenly after having a dinner with his cousin-in-law, and he was buried in the basilica with great honor, supposedly in his own family chapel. Theodorina survived her husband by nine years and died in 1508. Giovanni Antonio Bruzio in the 17th-century stated that Teodorina Cybo assigned the revenues of a house in the Borgo district for the maintenance of the chapel but the building was demolished when the new colonnade on St. Peter's Square was built.

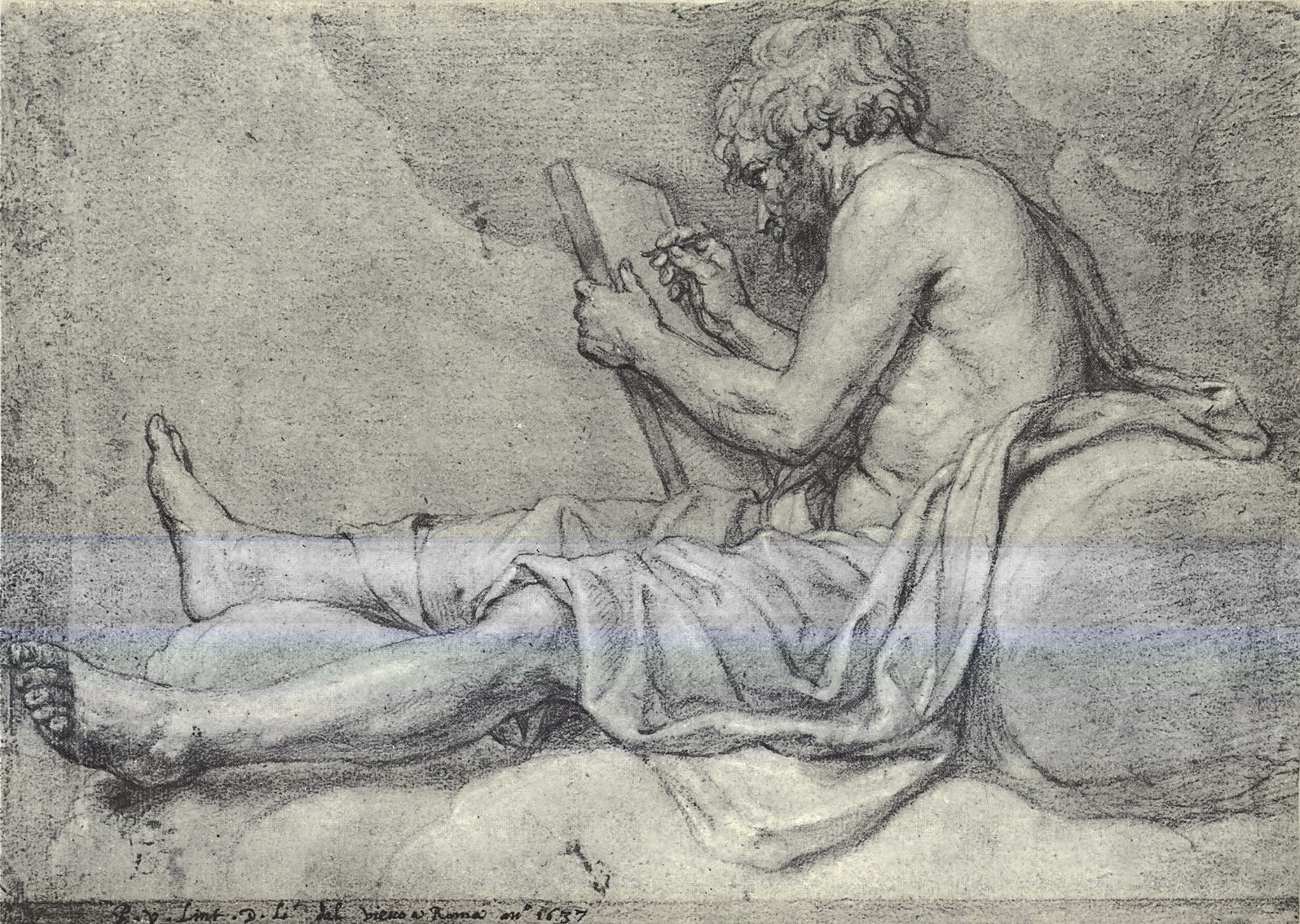
Preparatory study for the figure of Jonah by Pieter van Lint

The chapel was first mentioned in a contemporary document in 1530 as "capella Crucifixi" when the concession was renewed for Teodorina's son, Giambattista Usodimare (Cybo), the Bishop of Mariana. The bishop made an endowment of 30 gold scudi for the maintenance of the chapel instead of the house in the Borgo which had been destroyed during the Sack of Rome in 1527. In his will, dated to 1 December 1531 the bishop expressed his wish to be buried in the chapel and left the task to his heirs to erect a decent monument. At the time the chapel contained the burials of Teodorina and her husband. The bishop also donated valuable velvet and satin hangings. In 1555 the heirs, Cesare Cybo, the archbishop of Turin and Francesco Cybo renewed the endowment of the house in the Borgo which had been restored. The altar was consecrated on 18 October 1595.

There is not much left of the original Renaissance interior of the chapel except the large crucifix on the altar and the slabs of the beautiful marble transenna. It is uncertain whether it had any painted decoration. The chapel was fully restored after 1636 in Baroque style by a certain Innocenzo Cybo (†1640). At the time the walls and the vault were decorated with the extant frescos of Pieter van Lint, Ionic stucco capitals were added to the half-columns of the entrance arch and the burial vault was sealed with a new tomb slab.

The three heirs of the Cybo family renounced the patronage right of the chapel on 7 October 1747. It was bought by a new owner, Count Lorenzo Soderini in 1821 and restored in 1825. Soderini replaced the tomb slab, the coats-of-arms above the frescos on the lateral walls and created a new Corinthian aedicule for the crucifix.

== Description ==
The crucifix

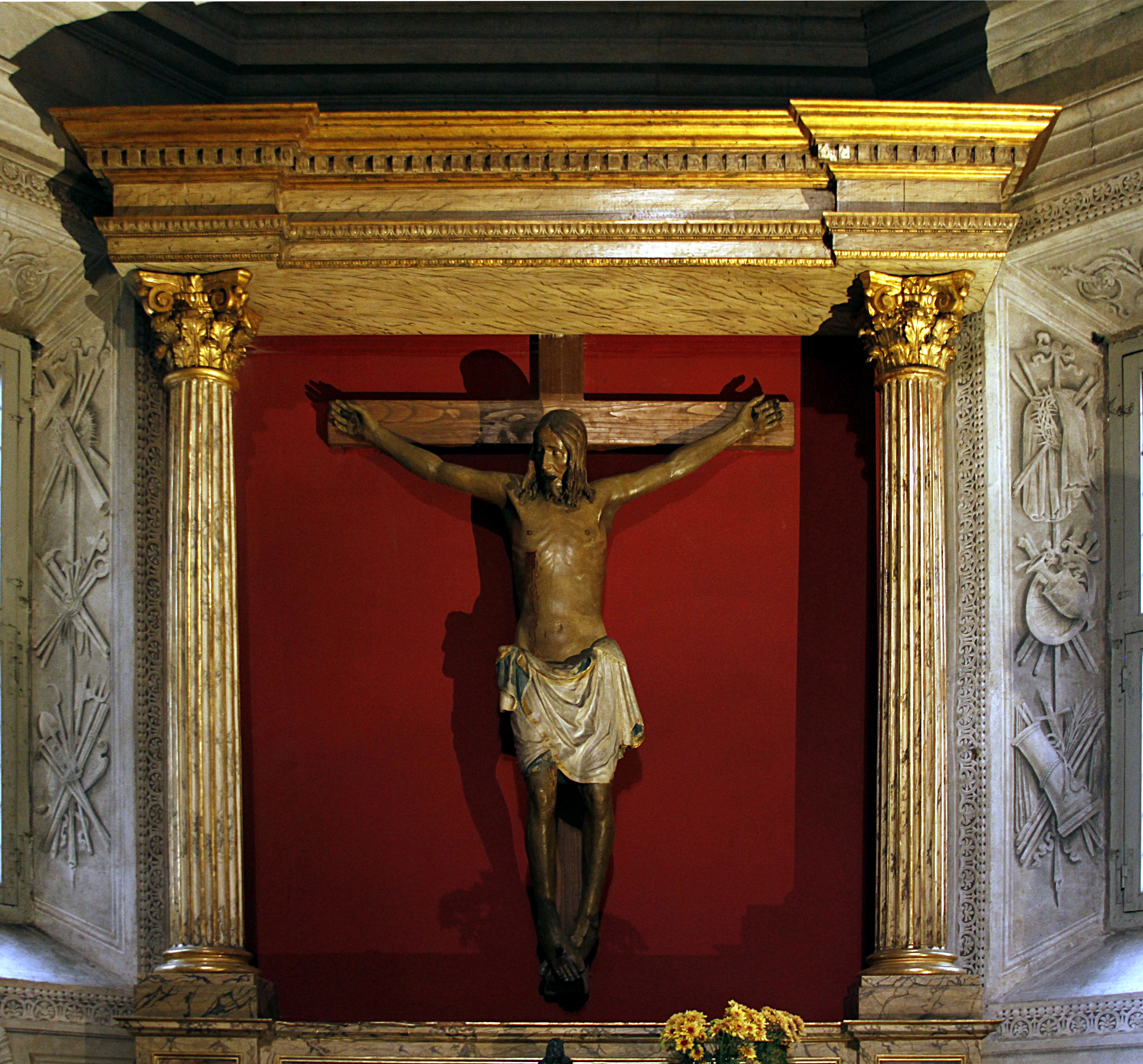
The crucifix

The wooden crucifix above the main altar was first mentioned in 1530 as the imago Crucifixi. The origin and authorship of the sculpture is uncertain. Barbara Fabjan assumed that it was produced in the orbit of Matteo Civitali, a Tuscan artist active in the second half of the 15th century. "The face appears to be a sort of coarse and rustic but intensely dramatic replica of the Eucharistic Christ at Lammari, a late work by Civitali executed between 1496 and 1501", she concluded. Fabjan supposed that the statue was commissioned by Teodorina Cybo in a period when Tuscan artistic influences were strong in Rome.

The statue became an object of great devotion. Tradition says that St Philip Neri spent a lot of time in front of it in prayer, while Pope Gregory XIII granted privileges to the altar in 1576. The justification for the 1636 restoration of the chapel was "the reverence felt by the whole Roman people" towards the statue, and the entire painted decoration aimed to underscore its importance. The current wooden Corinthian aedicule which frames the statue comes only from the 19th century but a similar structure was most probably created after 1636 because the decoration around the windows takes this into account. The sculpture was made of poplar wood covered in canvas, stuccoed and painted. The crucifix was restored in 1922 when the arms and the feet were replaced, the cross is modern.

Frescos

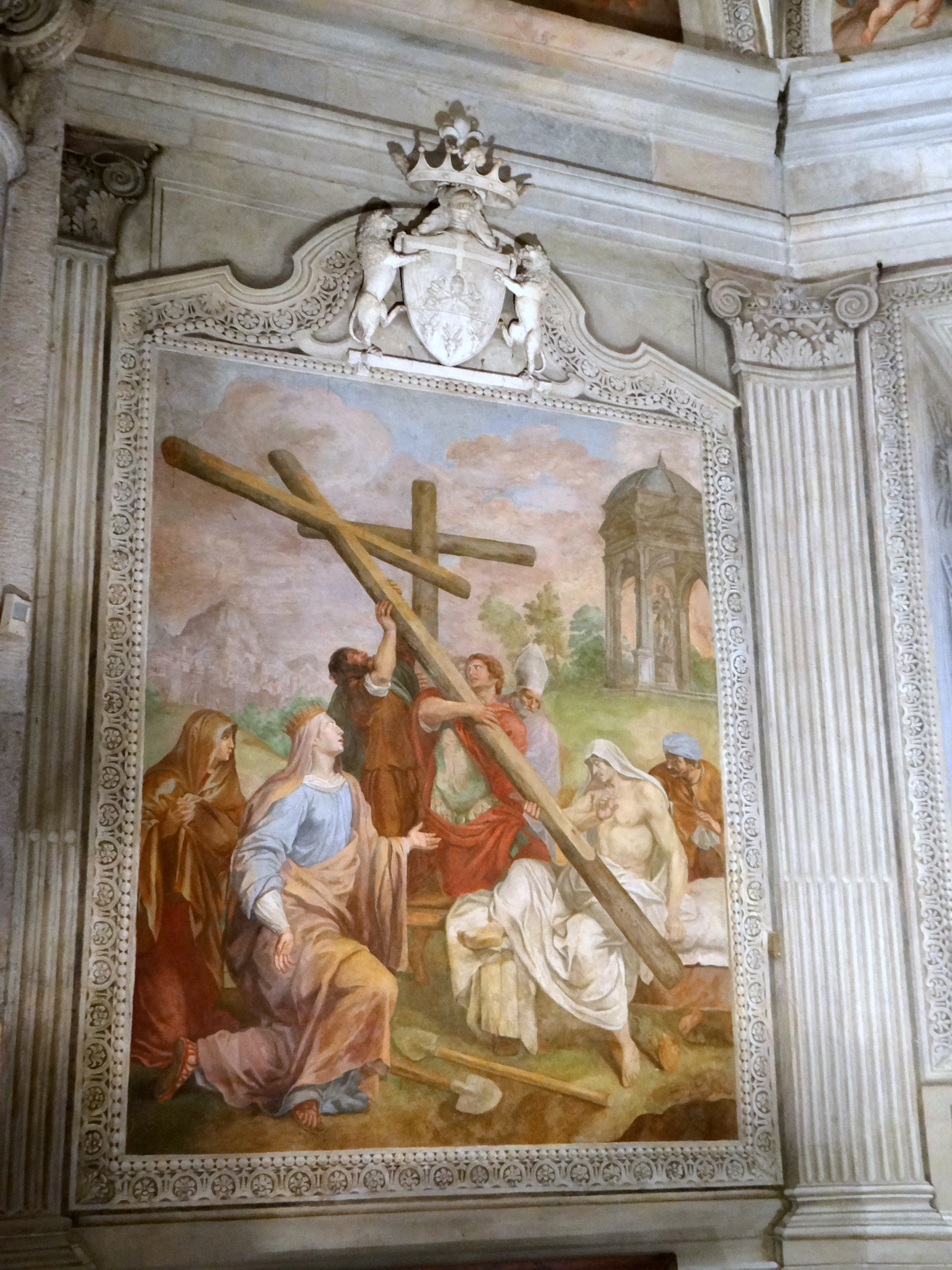
Invention of the True Cross by Pieter van Lint

The side walls are articulated by painted Corinthian pilasters and the splays of the windows are decorated with monochrome trophies including the instruments of the Passion. The archivolt of the entrance arch is decorated with coffers and rosettes. Two portraits in oval medallions on the sides of the altar represent Innocenzo Cybo and his wife (the male head is heavily damaged). The painted architecture, which is among the finest from the period in Rome, was executed by Pietro Paolo Drei.

Two large frescos by a Flemish artist, Pieter van Lint depict scenes from the legend of the True Cross: on the left side the Invention of the True Cross, on the right the Exaltation of the Cross. The first painting shows the moment when the True Cross was identified: three crosses were found on the site of the Calvary by Saint Helena and the body of a dead man was brought to the place. The True Cross restored the dead to life. The scene is set in a bucolic landscape with the city of Jerusalem on the left and a small shrine with the statue of Apollo on the right. The second painting shows Emperor Heraclius when he brought back the cross to Jerusalem in 629. He tried to enter the city carrying the cross but he was stopped until he dismounted his palfrey, and took off his imperial robes and boots. The gate of Jerusalem closely resembles the original Porta del Popolo outside of the basilica giving the impression that the procession is arriving on Via Flaminia. The richly decorated stucco frames of the paintings are crowned with the Soderini coat-of-arms.

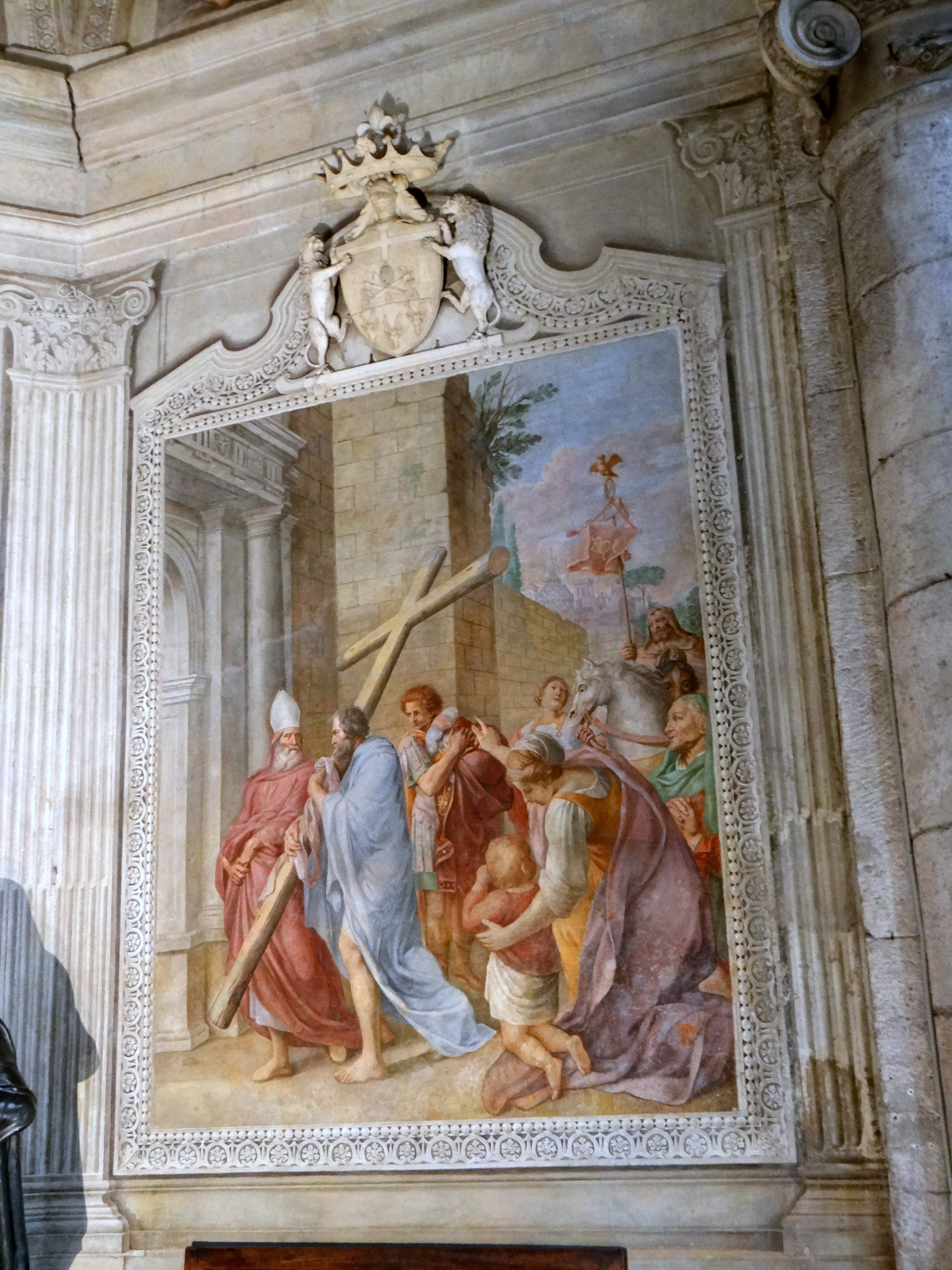
Exaltation of the Cross by Pieter van Lint

The Invention of the True Cross was copied by another Flemish artist, the engraver Pieter de Bailliu. He was also working in Rome around 1636 but his print was only published through the support of Judocus Gillis, the abbot of the Cistercian abbey of St. Bernard near Antwerp in the 1650s. A preparatory study for the same fresco was sold in Cologne in 1892.

The frescos on the vault depict the Angels with the Symbols of the Passion. In the five main field brightly winged angels hold objects associated with the Passion of Christ: the purple robe of mockery and the crown of thorns; the cross; the Veronica; the Holy Tunic; the Holy Lance and the Holy Sponge on a reed. In the two narrow fields on the sides there are chubby putti reading a book and playing on musical instruments. The fresco in the central oculus shows God the Father surrounded by cherubs. A small coat-of-arms of the Cybo family survived on the vault as part of the decoration. A preparatory study of an angel by Pieter van Lint is conserved in Rotterdam.

There are four Prophets in the lunettes while the central lunette is filled with clouds and two putti. The lunette frescos are connected to the central theme of the painted decoration because the four Old Testament figures prefigured or prophesied the mission and death of Jesus. The parallels could be easily grasped by an erudite spectator in the Baroque era but they were also explained by way of the accompanying inscriptions.

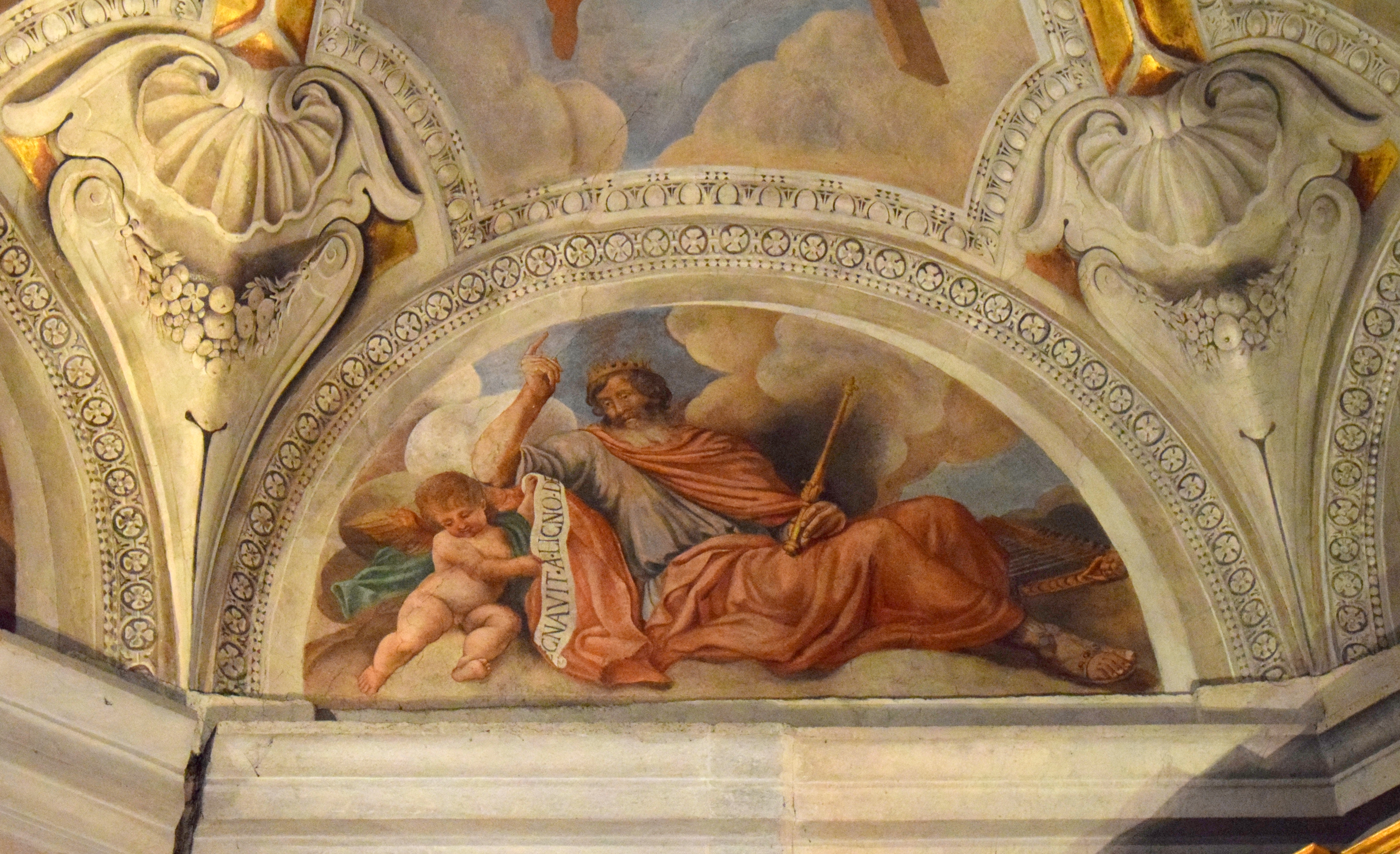
King David on a lunette painting

In the first lunette Daniel is depicted who visioned that "the Anointed One will be put to death" (Daniel 9:26) which was traditionally interpreted as a reference to the death of Christ. His angel is holding up a tablet with Greek, Latin and Hebrew letters, a probable reference to the holy relic of the Titulus Crucis which was also brought to Rome by Saint Helena. In the second lunette King David is shown with his harp, sceptre and a putto holding a scroll with an inscription: "[R]egnavit a ligno De[us]" which means: "God has reigned from the wood", an allusion to the cross. The expression is derived from a now obsolete version of the Psalm 96 in the Psalterium Romanum and appeared in this form in the hymn Vexilla Regis by Venantius Fortunatus. The words were widely understood as a prophecy that predicted the crucifixion of Christ and his reign over the world.

The third prophet is not Hosea, as sometimes mistakenly identified, but Isaiah. The words on his scroll clearly reveal his true identity: "Non est sp[eci]es ei ne[que decor]" which means "he had no form nor comeliness". This is a line from Isaiah 53, the fourth Servant song which has been interpreted as a prophecy about the suffering of Jesus since apostolic times.

At last Prophet Jonah is shown leaning against the whale and writing the following words on a tablet: "Tollite me, et [mittite in mare]" which means "Pick me up and [throw me into the sea]" (Jonah 1:12). The gesture that he was ready to give up his life to save his companions from certain death during the raging storm was seen as a prefiguration of the sacrifice of Christ. Augustine of Hippo wrote in a letter: "And as Jonah suffered this for the sake of those who were endangered by the storm, so Christ suffered for the sake of those who are tossed on the waves of this world."

Attribution

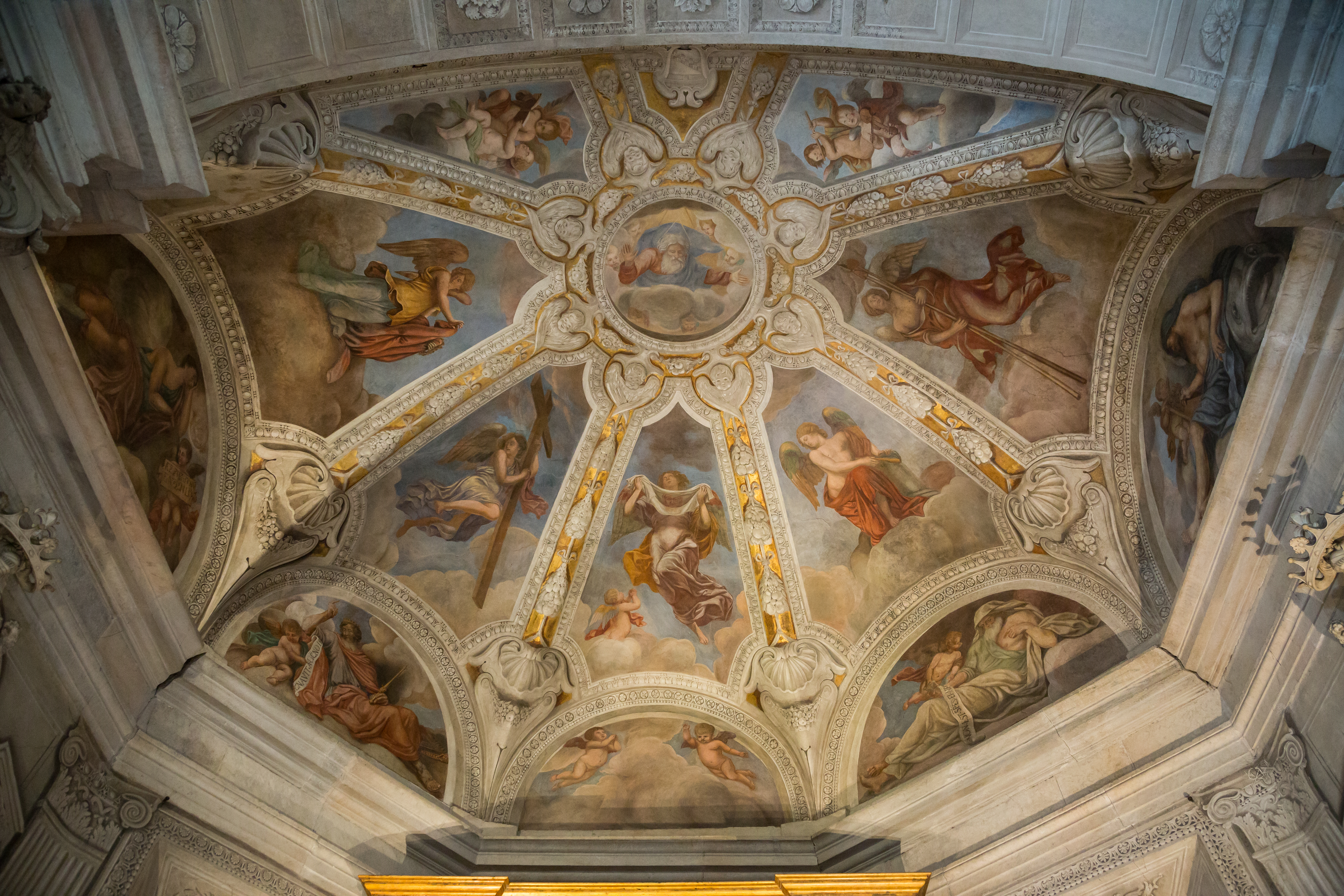
Frescoes of the vault

An inscription on the vault clearly states: "PETRUS/VAN LINT/(AN)T(VE)RP(ENSIS)/COLOR(IBU)S/P()R()T()S FEC(IT)/PETR(US) PAUL(US) DREUS/ROM(ANUS) ORNA/MENTA ARCH/ITE(C)T(URAE) DELIN(EAVIT)/AN(NO) SALUT(I)S/[...]", referring to Pieter van Lint (and also Pietro Paolo Drei). The year of the execution is missing due to a lacuna but a very fine preparatory study for the figure of Jonah, preserved in the Fondation Custodia, bears the date of 1637. In spite of the unambiguous painted statement, which was certainly meant as an advertisement for the two masters, the true authorship of the work became obfuscated. Some later Italian descriptions - in 1713, 1725 and 1741 - only speak of a fiammingo artist suggesting that Van Lint's name was not generally known at the time. In 1674 the paintings were erroneously attributed to Luigi Gentile by Filippo Titi and this mistake was often repeated in later literature.

Notwithstanding this confusion the frescos of the chapel were created by Pieter van Lint, a little-known Flemish artist who "proved to be a highly educated painter from a visual standpoint, deeply absorbing models of Italian painting, especially that of the Emilian school". The soft chromatic passages and the peaceful landscapes show the influence of Domenichino and Guido Reni.

Burial vault

The tomb slab is set in the middle of the tiled floor. The Latin inscription states that Count Soderini, a Roman patrician, restored the derelict chapel of the crucifix in 1825. The circular slab with the Soderini coats-of-arms is surrounded by six winged skulls in typical Baroque fashion. Possibly parts of the slab are older than the 18th century. At the entrance of the chapel the solid 15th-century Renaissance marble parapet is decorated with vases, cornucopias and the Cybo symbols.

== Indulgence tablet ==
Outside the chapel a slab with an inscription on the left pillar informs us about an indulgence granted by Pope Gregory XIII to the chapel in 1576. Mass celebrated at the altar for the dead will free their souls from the Purgatory. The black marble slab is set in a white stone frame decorated with volutes and a winged angel. It is crowned with an arched broken pediment and the coat-of-the-arms of the pope.

== Gallery ==
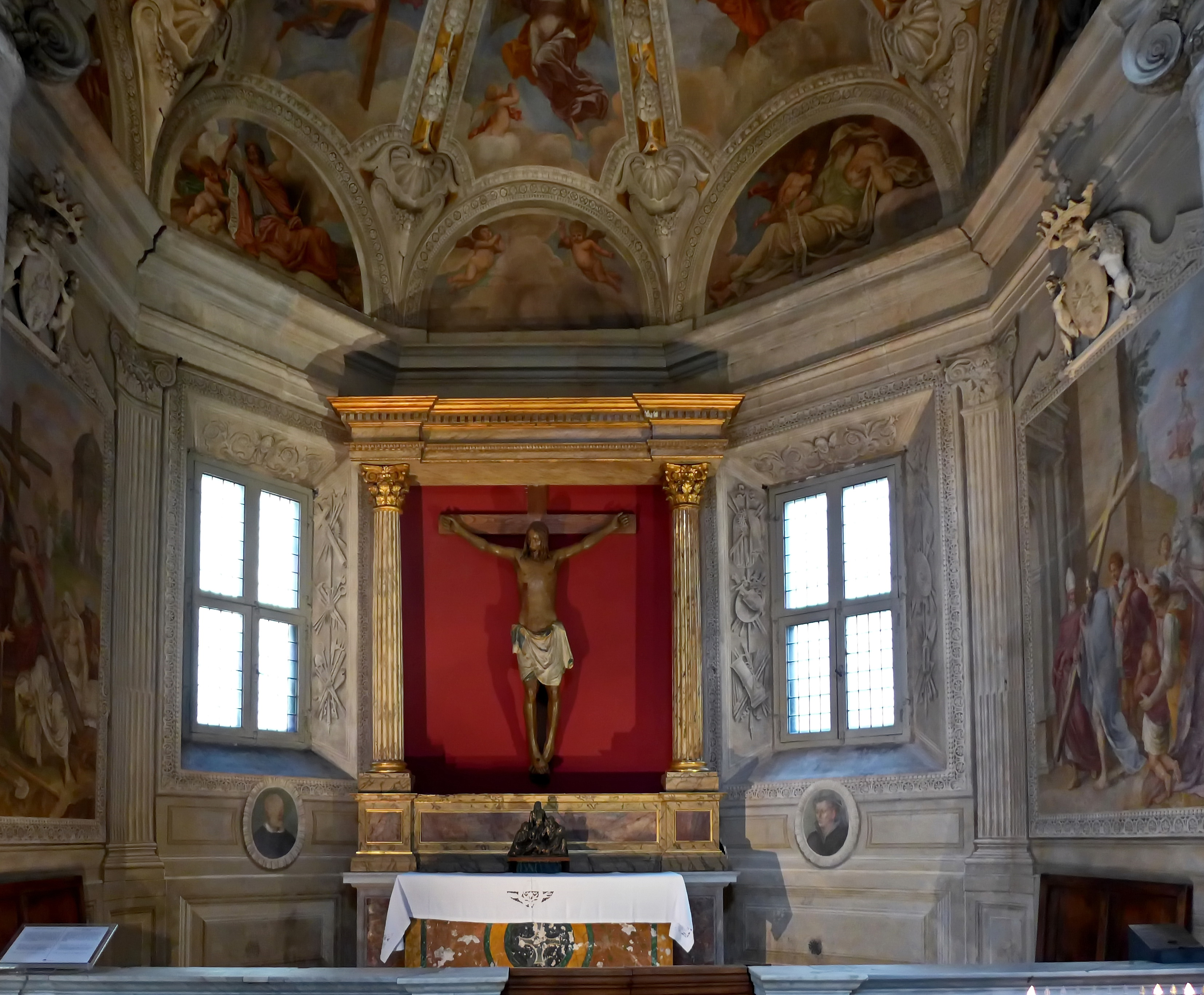
General view

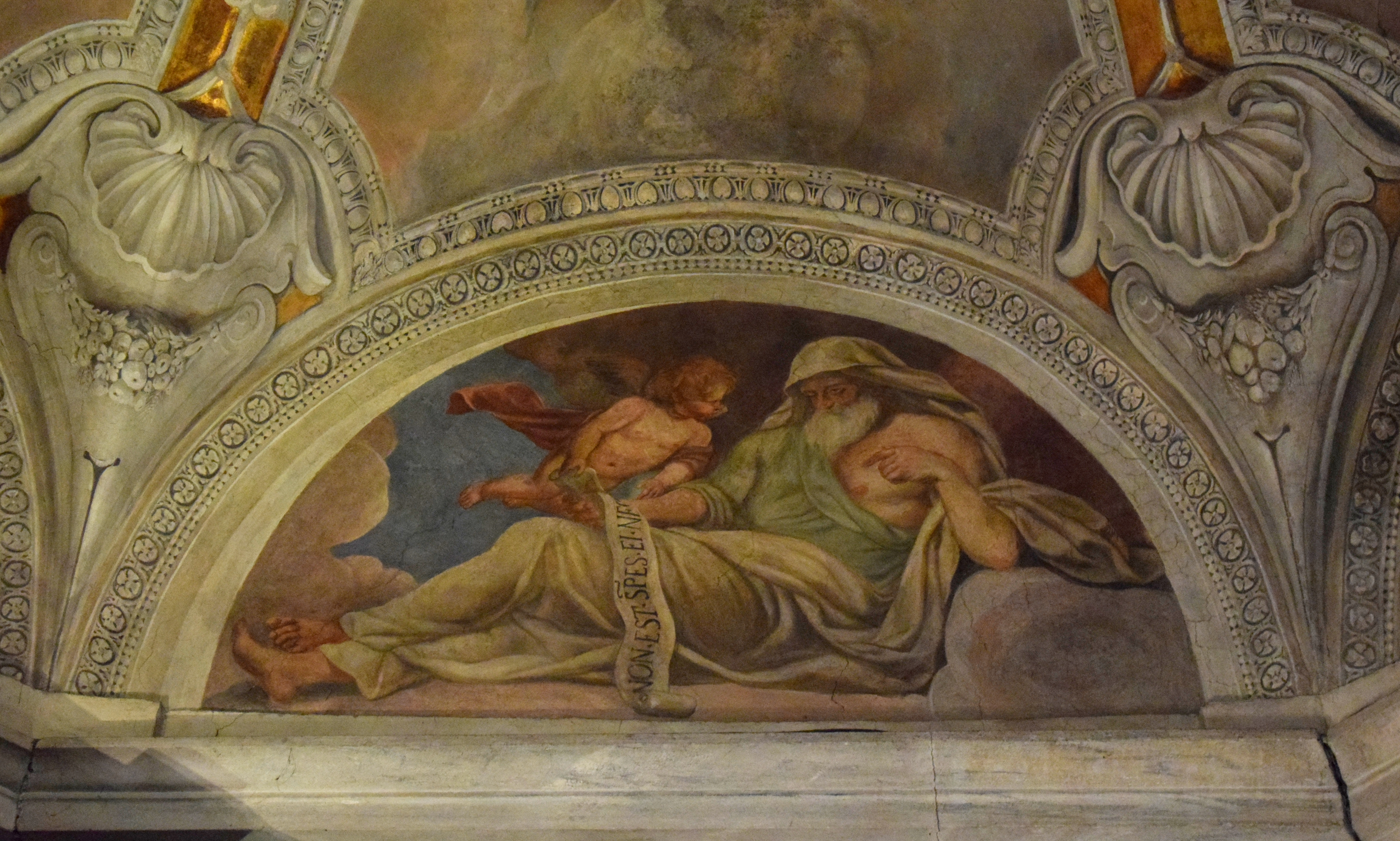
Prophet Isaiah

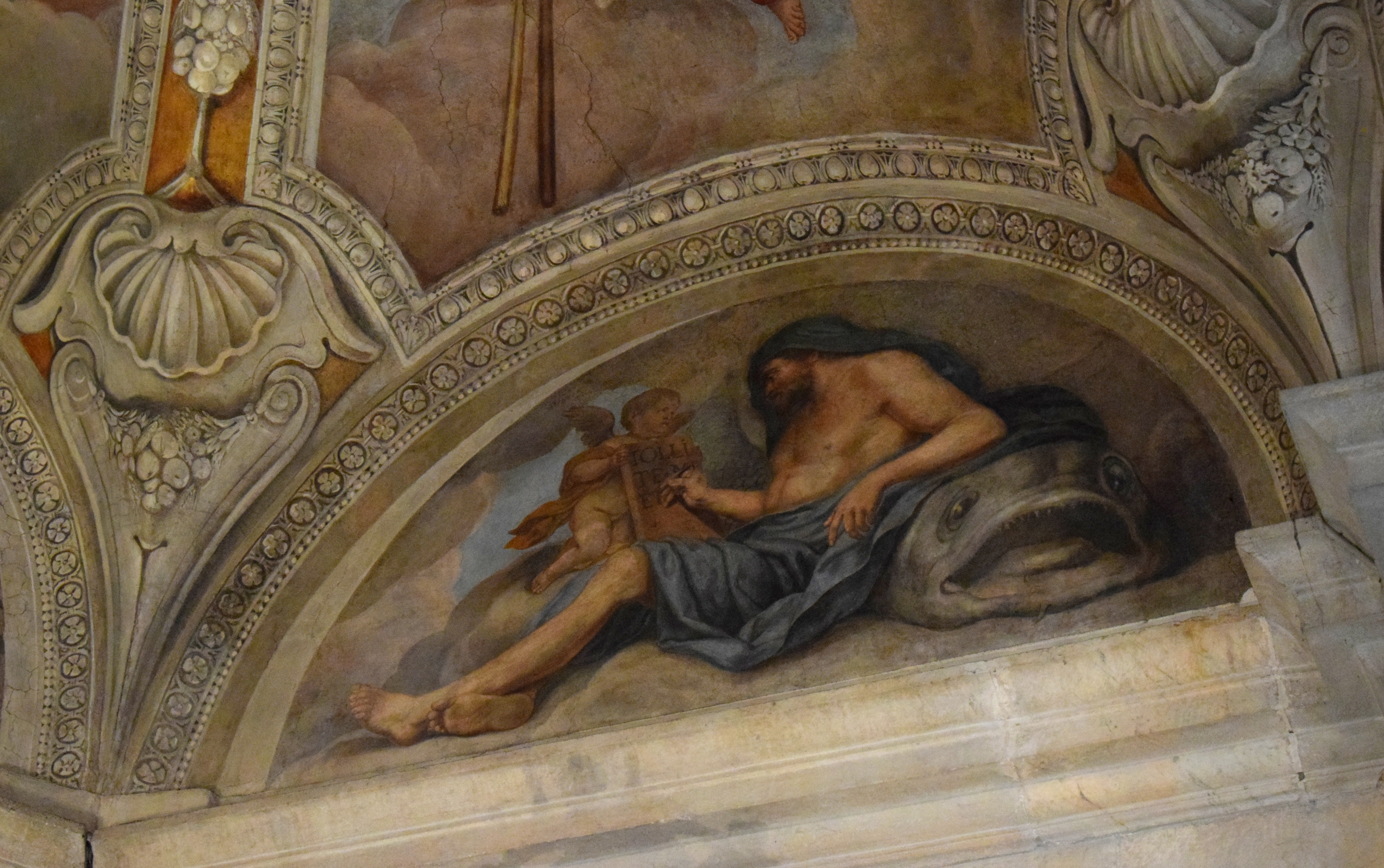
Prophet Jonah

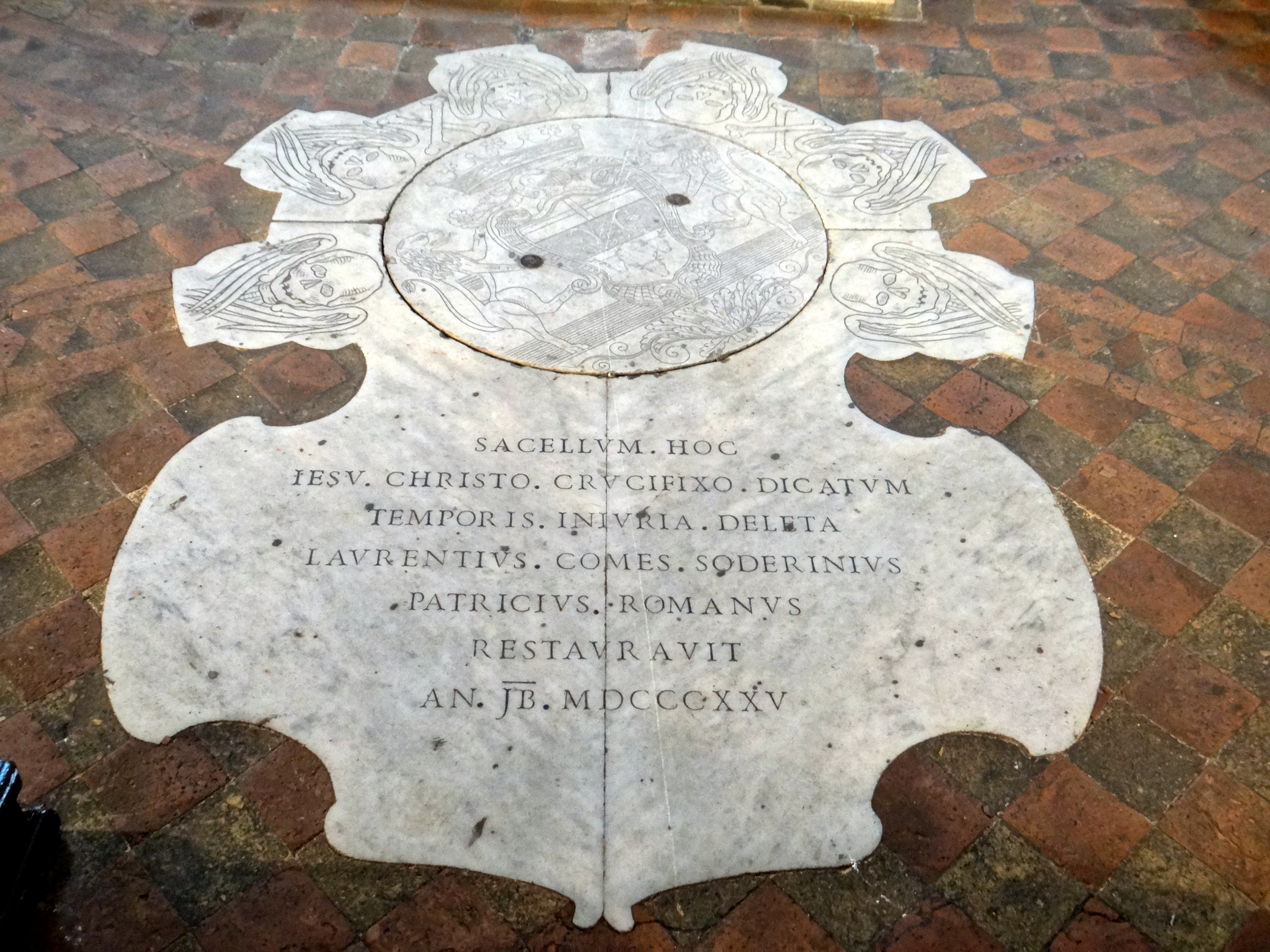
Tomb slab of Lorenzo Soderini in the floor

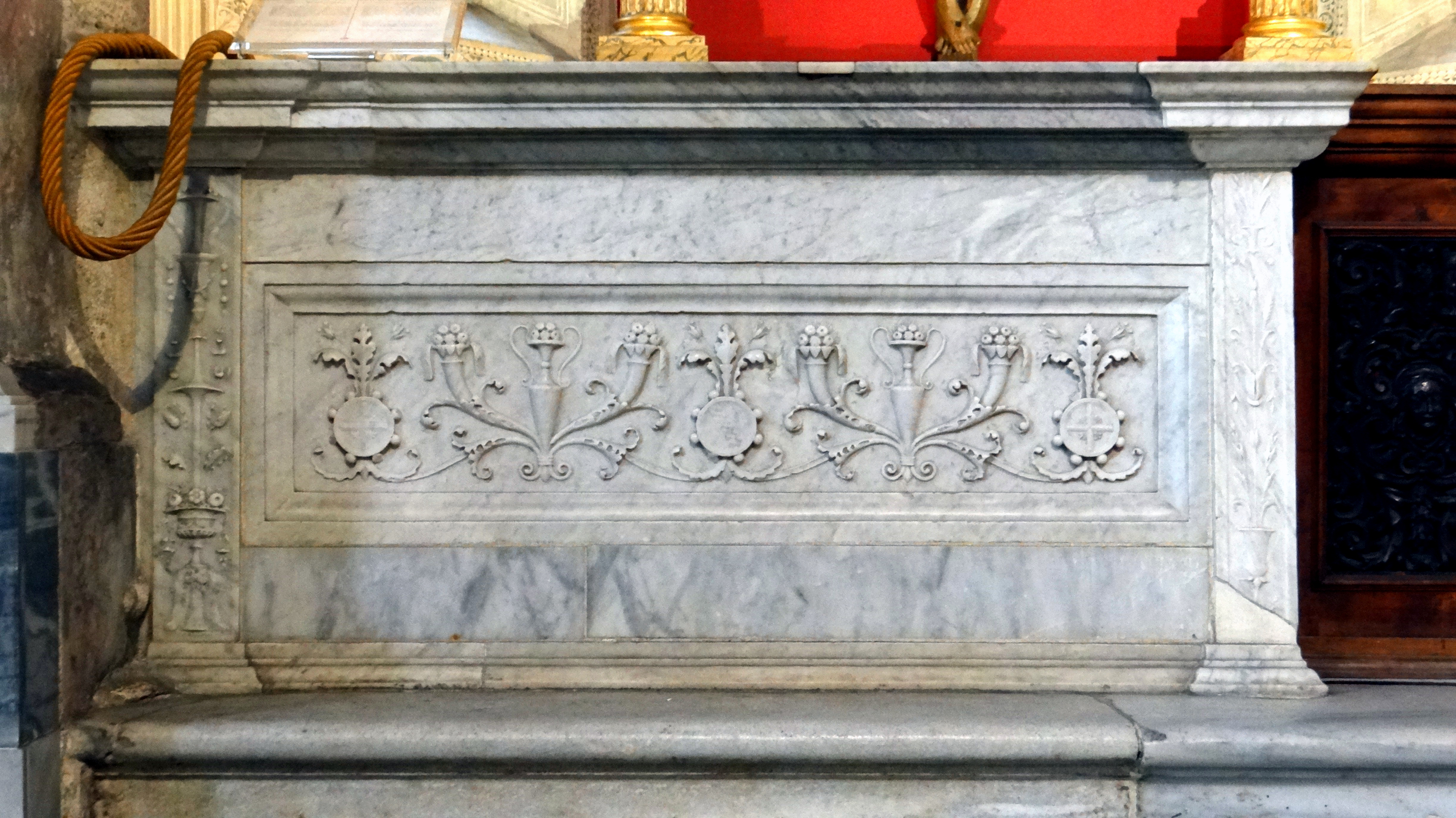
The Renaissance parapet

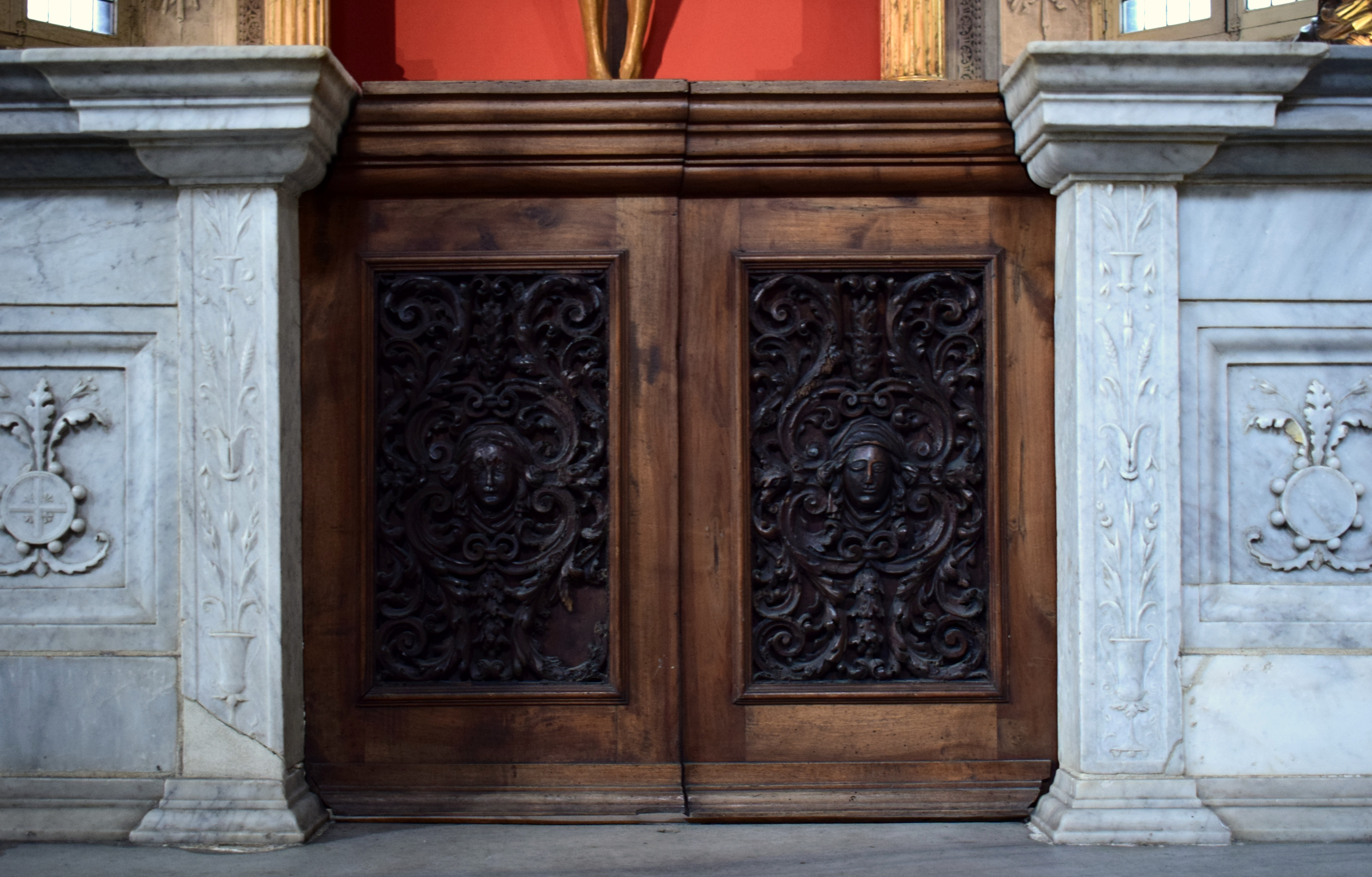
Wooden doors of the parapet

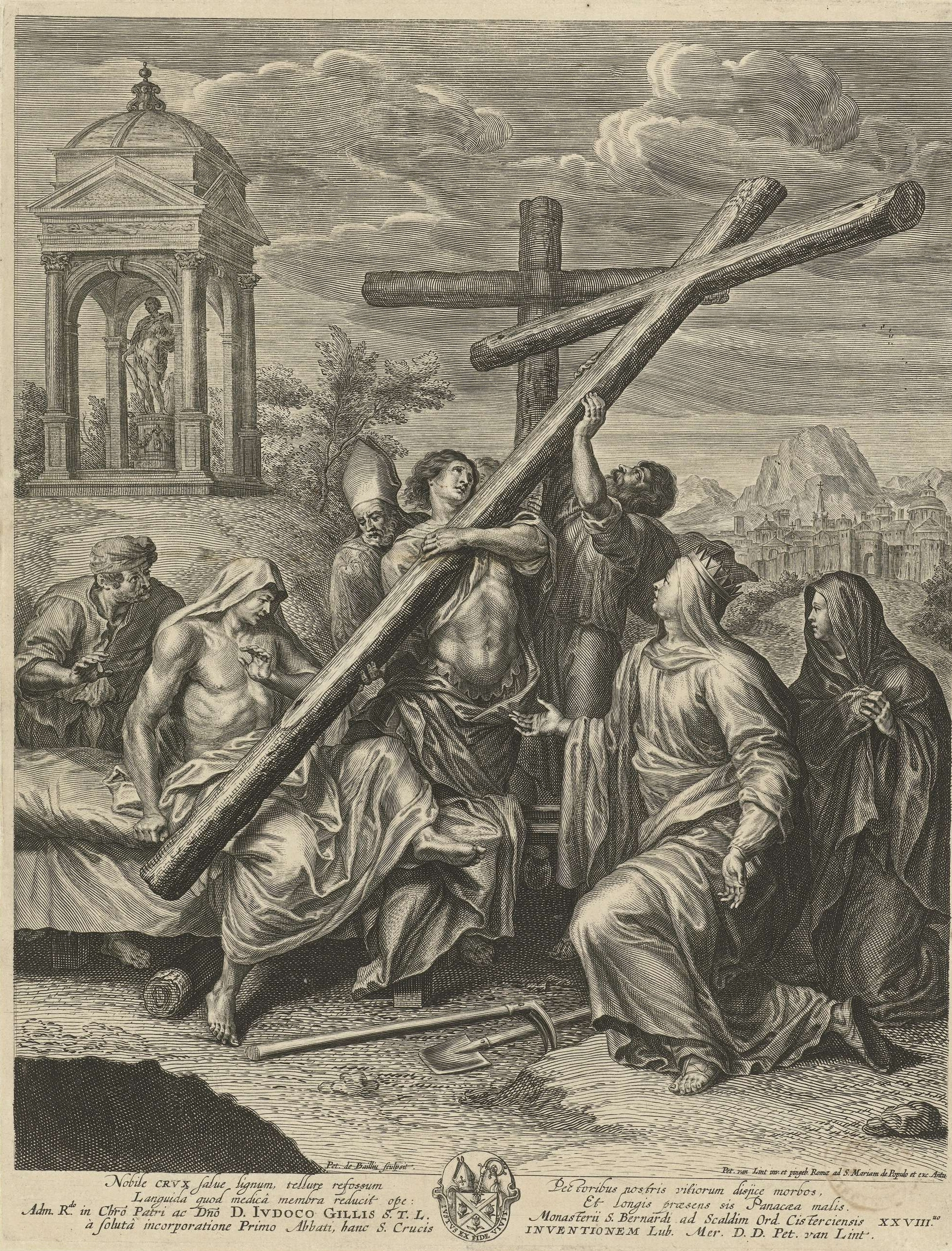
Engraving of Pieter de Bailliu

== Bibliography ==
- Ilaria Miarelli Mariani: La pittura, in Santa Maria del Popolo. Storia e restauri, eds. Ilaria Miarelli-Mariani and Maria Richiello, Istituto Poligrafico e Zecca dello Stato, 2009.
