= Pietro Paolo Drei =

Pietro Paolo Drei (Petro Pauolo Dreio or Pietro Paulo Dreo) (c.1600 – 1656) worked for the Fabbrica of St Peter's Basilica, first as a fattore (under supervisor) and later as a soprastante (foreman and architect's assistant). He was the son of Benedetto (c.1580 – 1637), also a fattore of the Fabbrica, whom he assisted with flower mosaics on the floor of St Peter's Basilica for 13 years – from approximately 1620. This involved creating imagery by arranging vibrant flower petals. In the works, whole flowers, individual petals, and petals which had been cut into smaller pieces made up the composition.
