= Antonio della Cornia =

Italian painter

- Known for: Paint

Antonio della Cornia (c. 1584 – 1654) was an Italian Baroque painter in Rome. He was a member of the Accademia di San Luca from 1634, and painted mainly religious subjects.
