= Galleria Borghese =

Art gallery in Rome, Italy

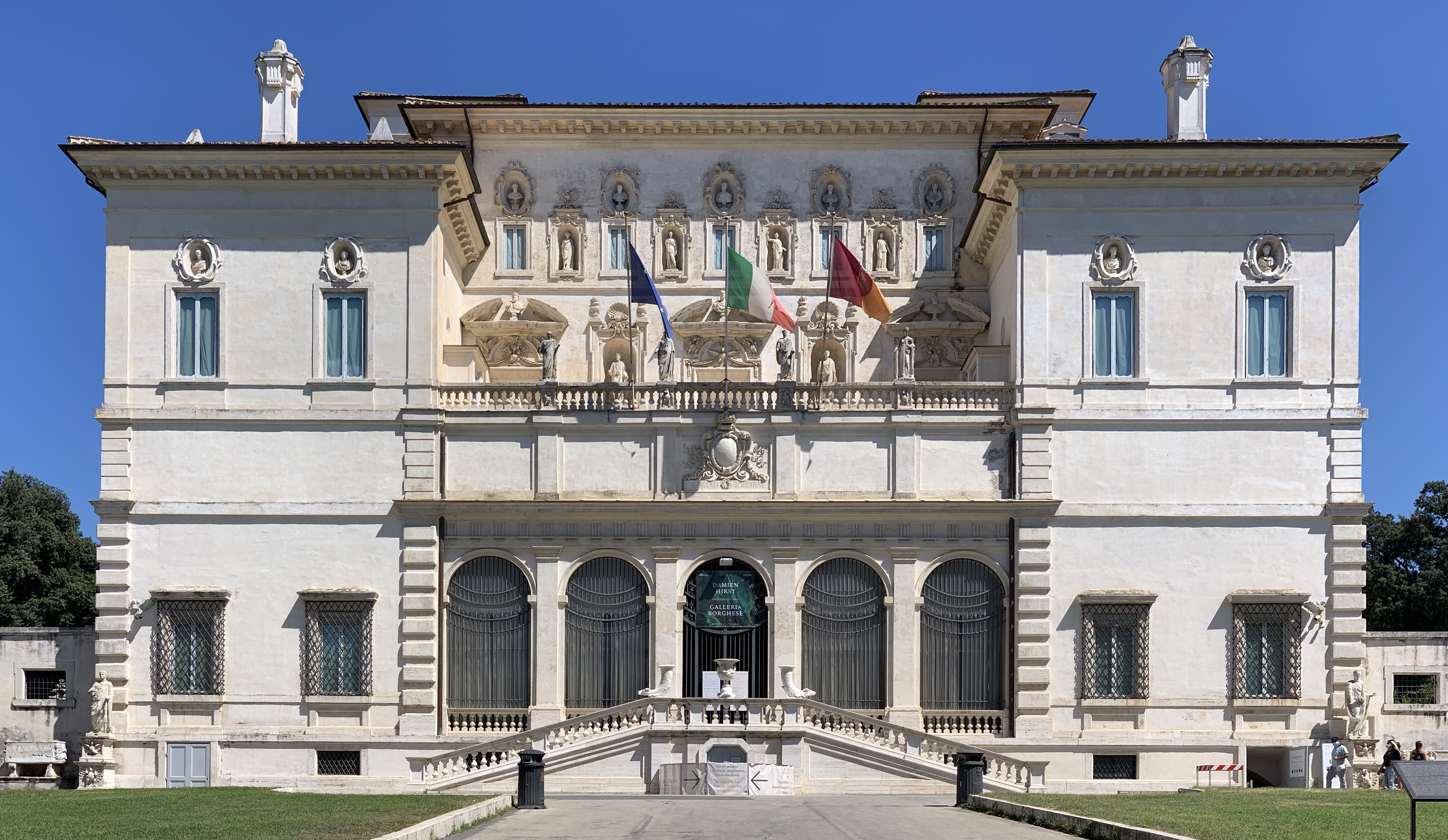
- Façade of the Villa Borghese Pinciana inside the gardens of the Villa
- Click on the map for a fullscreen view
- Established: 1903; 123 years ago
- Location: Villa Borghese, Rome, Italy
- Coordinates: 41°54′51″N 12°29′32″E
- Type: Art museum
- Director: Francesca Cappelletti
- Website: galleriaborghese.cultura.gov

The Galleria Borghese or Borghese Gallery is an art gallery in Rome, Italy, housed in the former Villa Borghese Pinciana. At the outset, the gallery building was integrated with its gardens, but nowadays the Villa Borghese gardens are considered a separate tourist attraction. The Galleria Borghese houses a substantial part of the Borghese Collection of paintings, sculpture and antiquities, begun by Cardinal Scipione Borghese, the nephew of Pope Paul V (reign 1605–1621). The building was constructed by the architect Flaminio Ponzio, developing sketches by Scipione Borghese himself, who used it as a villa suburbana, a country villa at the edge of Rome.

The gallery displays one of the most prestigious art collections in the world, with masterpieces by artists such as Caravaggio, Bernini, Canova, Raphael and Titian. Scipione Borghese was an early patron of Bernini and an avid collector of works by Caravaggio, who is well represented in the collection by his Boy with a Basket of Fruit, St Jerome Writing, Sick Bacchus and others. Additional paintings of note include Titian's Sacred and Profane Love, Raphael's Entombment of Christ and works by Peter Paul Rubens and Federico Barocci. Considered among the greatest masterpieces of Italian art, some of these works show the evolution of art between the Renaissance, the Baroque and the Neoclassicism, artistic movements born in the Italian peninsula and subsequently spread throughout Europe.

== History ==
The Casino Borghese was erected in an area that in the seventeenth-century was outside the walls of Rome, with the closest access being the Porta del Popolo. At the origins, the villa grounds covered an area with a circumference of nearly 5 km (3 miles).

The main building was designed by the Flemish architect Giovanni Vasanzio. The portico had spolia derived from the Arch of Claudius, once on the Via Flaminia.

By 1644, John Evelyn described it as "an Elysium of delight" with "Fountains of sundry inventions, Groves and small Rivulets of Water". Evelyn also described the Vivarium that housed ostriches, peacocks, swans and cranes "and divers strange Beasts". Prince Marcantonio IV Borghese (1730–1800), who began the recasting of the park's formal garden architecture into an English landscape garden, also set out about 1775, under the guidance of the architect Antonio Asprucci, to replace the now-outdated tapestry and leather hangings and renovate the Casina, restaging the Borghese sculptures and antiquities in a thematic new ordering that celebrated the Borghese position in Rome. The rehabilitation of the much-visited villa as a genuinely public museum in the late eighteenth century was the subject of an exhibition at the Getty Research Institute, Los Angeles, in 2000, spurred by the Getty's acquisition of 54 drawings related to the project.

In 1808, Prince Camillo Borghese, Napoleon's brother-in-law, was forced to sell the Borghese Roman sculptures and antiquities to the Emperor. The result is that the Borghese Gladiator, renowned since the 1620s as the most admired single sculpture in Villa Borghese, must now be appreciated in the Louvre. The "Borghese Hermaphroditus" is also now in the Louvre.

The Borghese villa was modified and extended down the years, eventually being sold to the Italian government in 1902, along with the entire Borghese estate and surrounding gardens and parkland.

== Collection ==
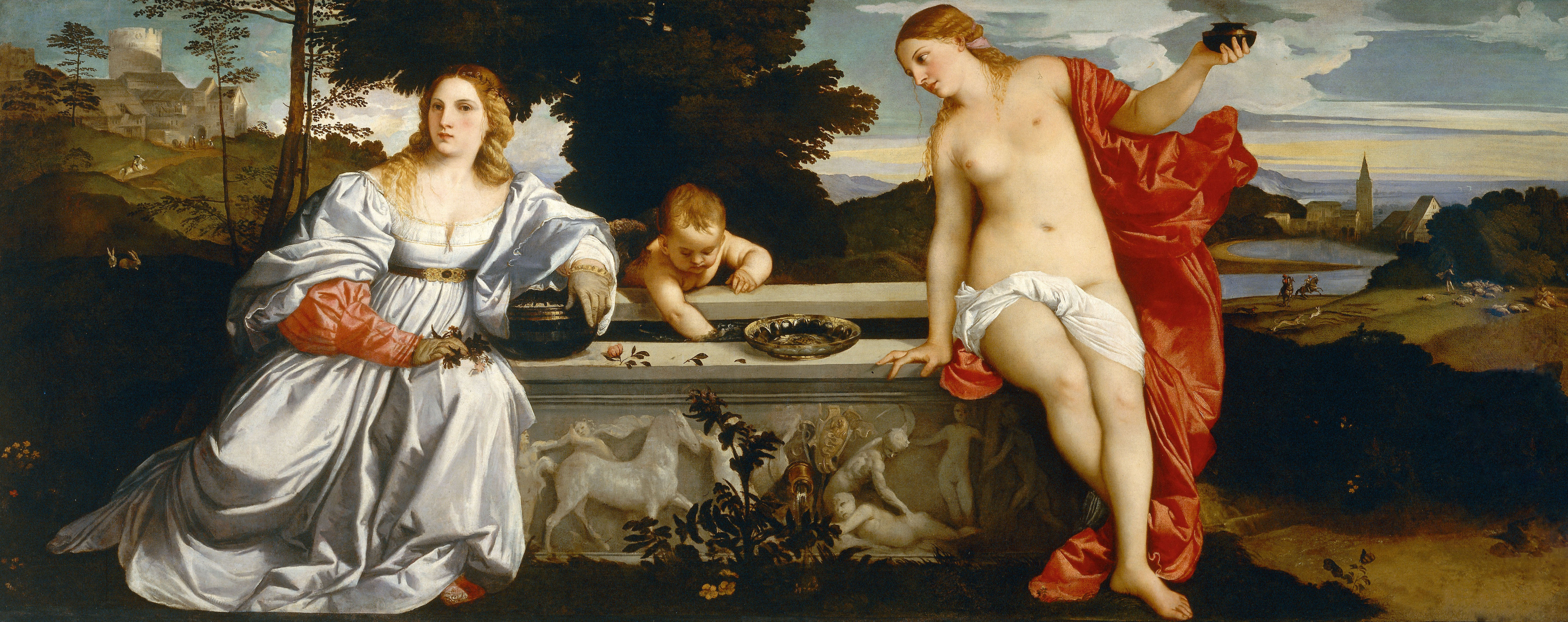
Sacred and Profane Love by Titian, c. 1514

The Galleria Borghese includes twenty rooms across two floors.

The main floor is mostly devoted to classical antiquities of the 1st–3rd centuries AD (including a famous 320–330 AD mosaic of gladiators found on the Borghese estate at Torrenova, on the Via Casilina outside Rome, in 1834), and classical and neo-classical sculpture such as the Venus Victrix.

The main floor's main large hall, called the Salone, has a large trompe-l'œil ceiling fresco in the first room by the Sicilian artist Mariano Rossi makes such good use of foreshortening that it appears almost three-dimensional. The fresco depicts Marcus Furius Camillus relieving the siege of the Capitoline Hill by the Gauls. The grotteschi decorations were painted by Pietro Rotari, and the animal decorations by Venceslaus Peter Boemo.

The first hall off the Salone, is the Camera di Cerere, with marble vase depicting Oedipus and the Sphinx. The second hall has a ceiling frescoed by Francesco Caccianiga with the Fall of Phaeton. The third hall houses Bernini's Apollo and Daphne.

=== Gian Lorenzo Bernini at the Borghese ===
Many of the sculptures are displayed in the spaces for which they were intended, including many works by Gian Lorenzo Bernini, which comprise a significant percentage of his output of secular sculpture, starting with early works such as the Goat Amalthea with Infant Jupiter and Faun (1615) and Aeneas, Anchises & Ascanius (1618–1619) to his dynamic Rape of Proserpine (1621–1622), Apollo and Daphne (1622–1625) and David (1623) which are considered seminal works of baroque sculpture. In addition, several portrait busts are included in the gallery, including one of Pope Paul V, and two portraits of one of his early patrons, Cardinal Scipione Borghese (1632). The second Scipione Borghese portrait was produced after a large crack was discovered in the marble of the first version during its creation.

=== Halls ===
The Mariano Rossi Hall, dominated by the imposing fresco titled: "Romulus Welcomed to Olympus by Jupiter to Ensure the Victory of Furius Camillus over Brennus, King of the Gauls." (1775-1779)

- Porch and Entrance Hall: The entrance hall houses a Roman statue of Augustus, the Gladiator Mosaic, as well as the sculpture The Truth by Bernini;
- Hall I of Pauline: Its walls are decorated with original antique reliefs and others dating from the 18th and 19th centuries. It houses busts of Valadier (Bacchus, Hermes), and in its center, the famous sculpture by Canova Pauline Borghese as Venus Victrix, which gave its name to the room;
- Hall II of David: this hall is also called the "Room of the Sun" because of the painting on its vault representing the fall of Phaethon. The statue of David by Bernini stands at its centre. It also features Annibale Carracci's Samson in Prison, as well as Greek sarcophagi from the 2nd century;
- Hall III of Apollo and Daphne: it houses Bernini's sculpture Apollo and Daphne, also the theme of the painted vault at the end of the 18th century. The hall also houses Hellenistic and Roman sculptures, and works by the painter Dosso Dossi;
- Hall IV of the Emperors: this sumptuous hall decorated with stucco, marble, frescoes and paintings, owes its name of Gallery of the Emperors to its Roman busts displayed along the walls. Antonio Asprucci carried out its decoration from 1778 to 1780, mixing precious materials and using the most advanced techniques of the time. The wall niches house antique statues, including the Artemis Borghese, a Greek original from the 4th century. Two major works by Bernini, The Rape of Proserpina in marble, and Neptune with Dolphin in bronze, stand alongside the Farnese Bull by Antonio Susini. The two dodecagonal tables are by Luigi Valadier and the four white marble vases with the Seasons by Maximilien Laboureur (1739–1812). The Rape of Proserpina, the paragon urns by Lorenzo Nizza and the porphyry tables and cups date from the time of Cardinal Scipione Borghese. The ceiling canvases were painted by Domenico De Angelis, who took up the theme of the myth of Galatea. The Sienese artist Giovan Battista Marchetti (1730–1800) created the perspective architecture of grotesques that frame them. The frieze painted under the impost of the ceiling and the stucco reliefs on the walls are inspired by the theme of sea divinities. The hexagonal tiles on a blue micromosaic background, imitating the antique, were designed by Tommaso Conca. The Roman mosaic pilasters are influenced by Raphaelesque models. The marble ornamentation of the floor is in harmony with the trompe-l'oeil decorations of the ceiling;
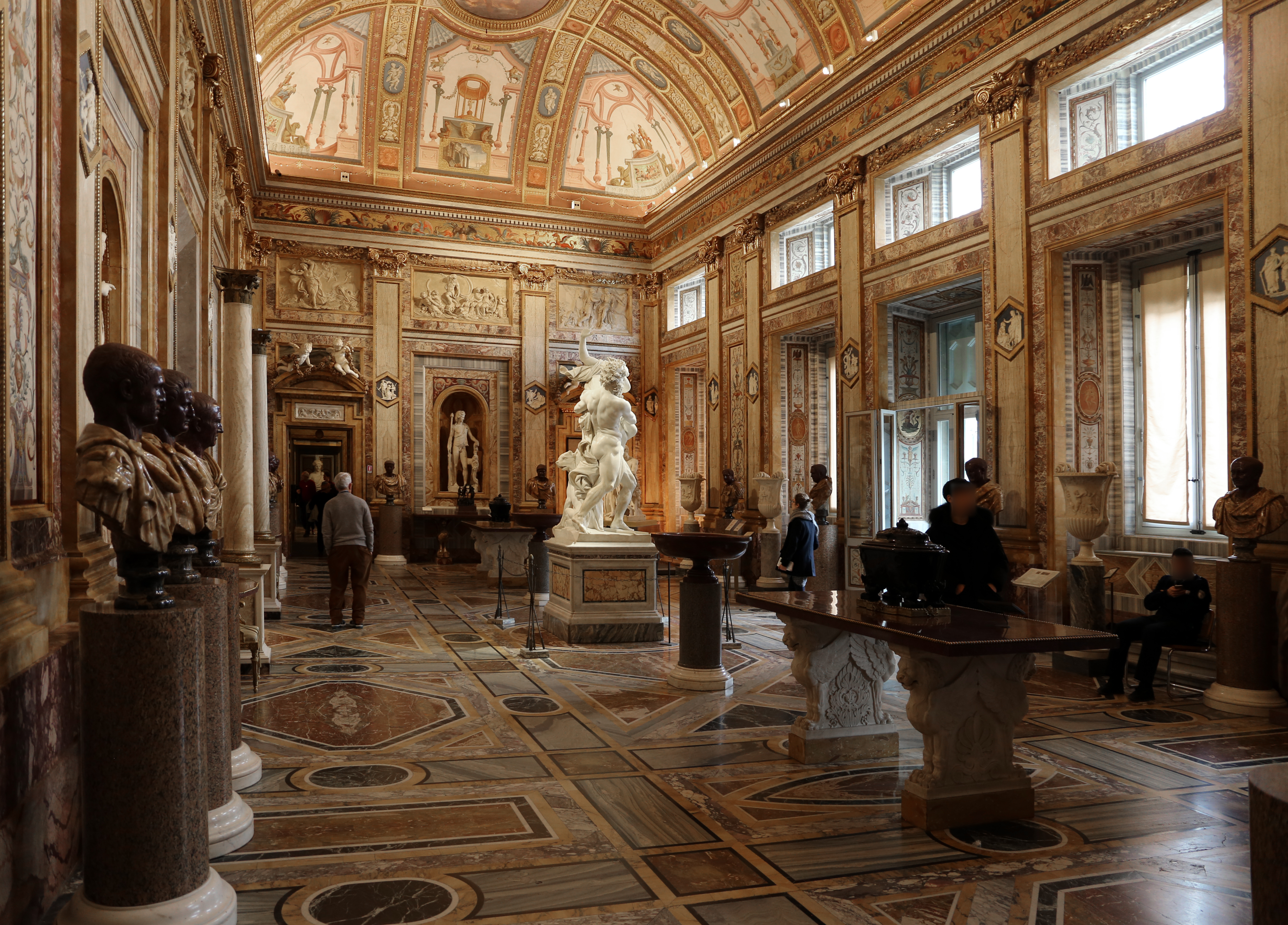
Hall IV of the Emperors

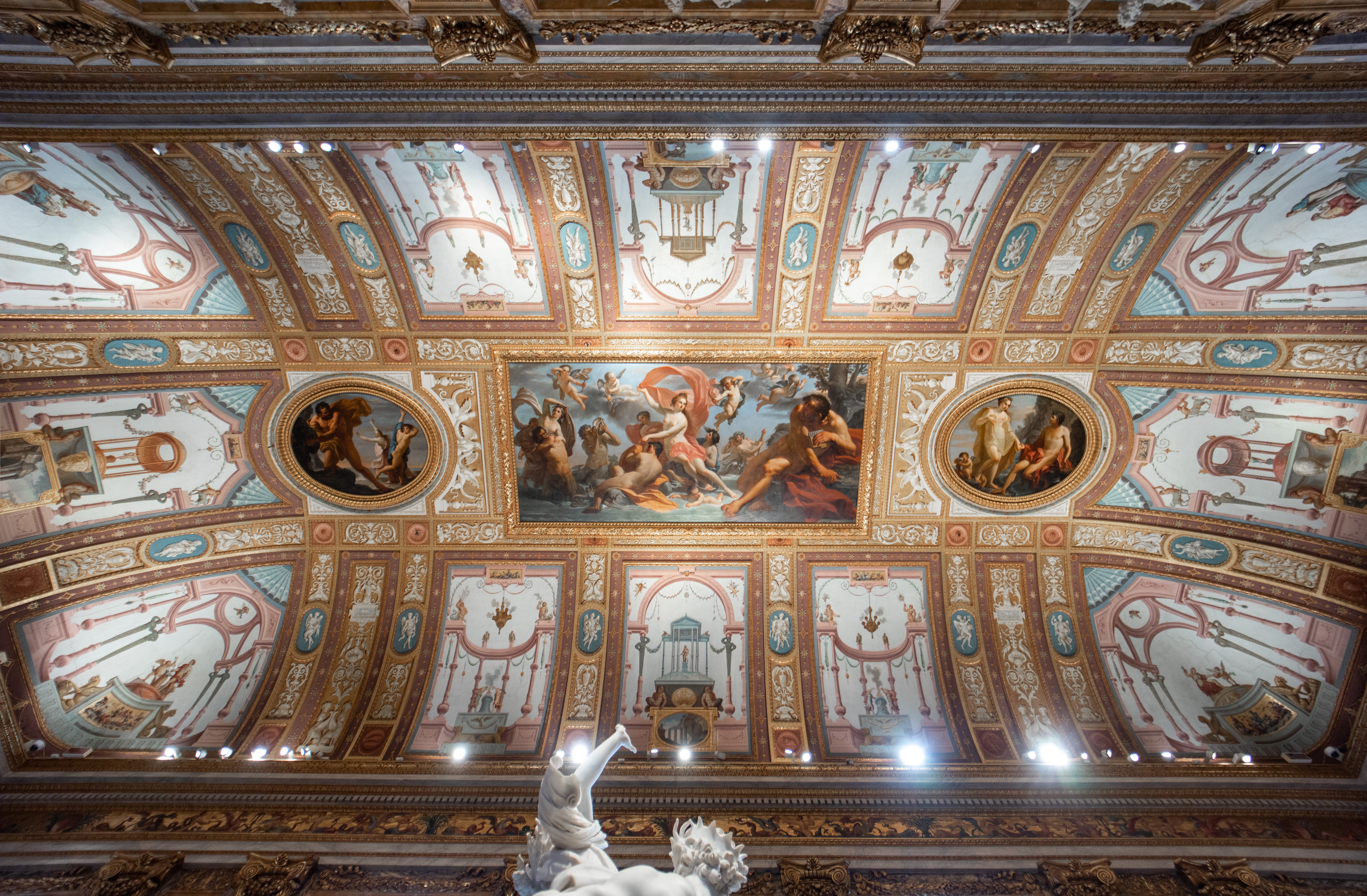
Ceiling of Hall IV

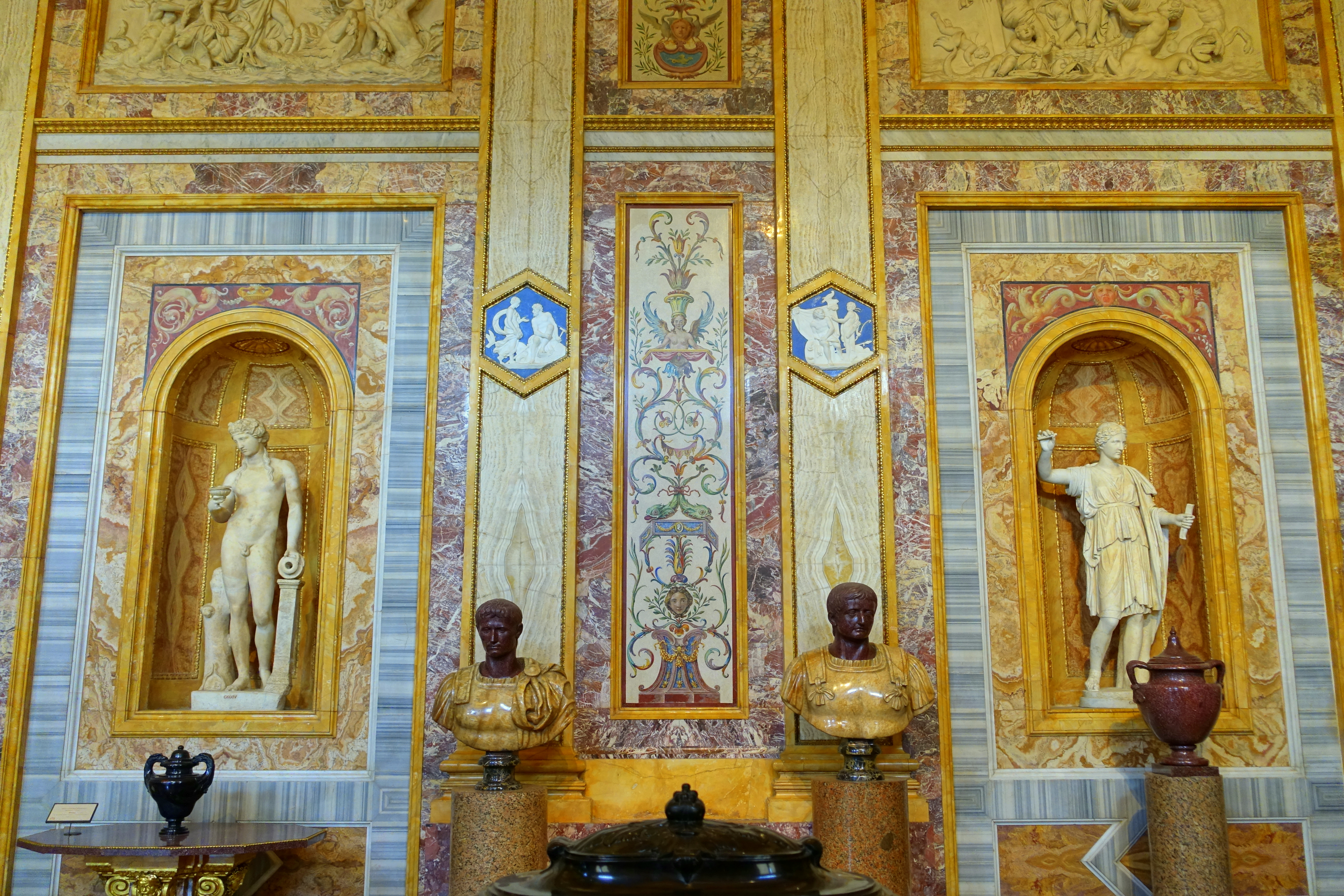
Details
- Hall V of the Hermaphroditu: The Sleeping Hermaphroditus is one of the two copies of the original bronze sculpture of Polykleitos. The sculpture was restored by Bernini who transformed its marble base into a mattress on which the character rests. Also, a Roman mosaic from the 2nd century representing a fishing scene;
- Hall VI of Aeneas and Anchises: It houses the marble statue of Aeneas and Anchises, a work of Bernini's youth;

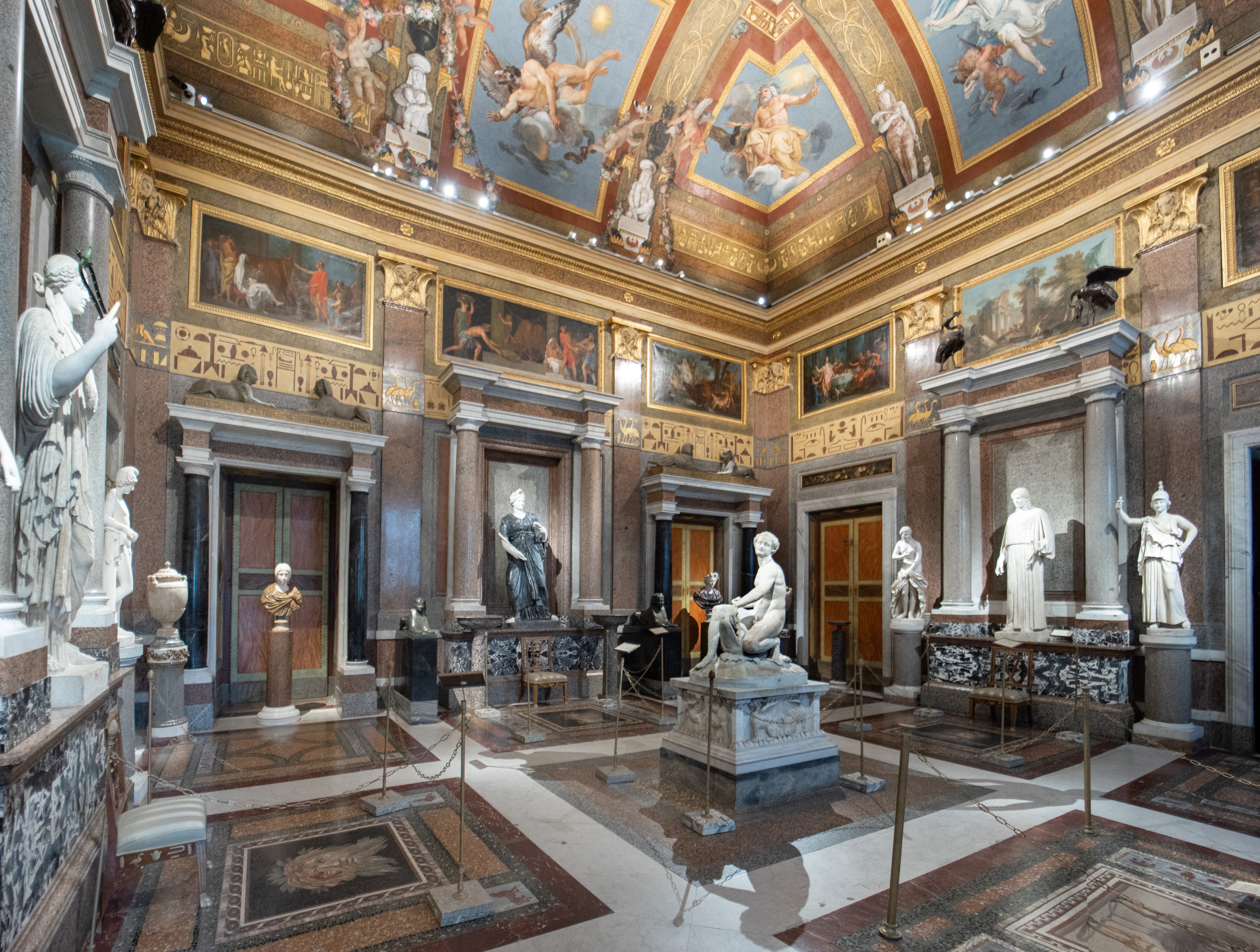
Egyptian Hall VII

- Egyptian Hall VII: made between 1778 and 1782, this hall, which houses numerous sculptures, including a marble Faun on Dolphin from the Roman period, was designed by Antonio Asprucci. The decoration is inspired by Ancient Egypt and is a model of the taste of the time, which mixes archaeological rarities and exotic oddities. Tommasso Conca painted the ceiling, including the central canvas with Cybele pouring out gifts on Egypt, and the History of Antony and Cleopatra on the walls. The architectural ornaments on the ceiling are by Giovan Battista Marchetti. On the floor, three mosaic fragments depict mascarons of Ocean and other marine personifications; the mosaic Roman calendar dates from the first half of the 3rd century;

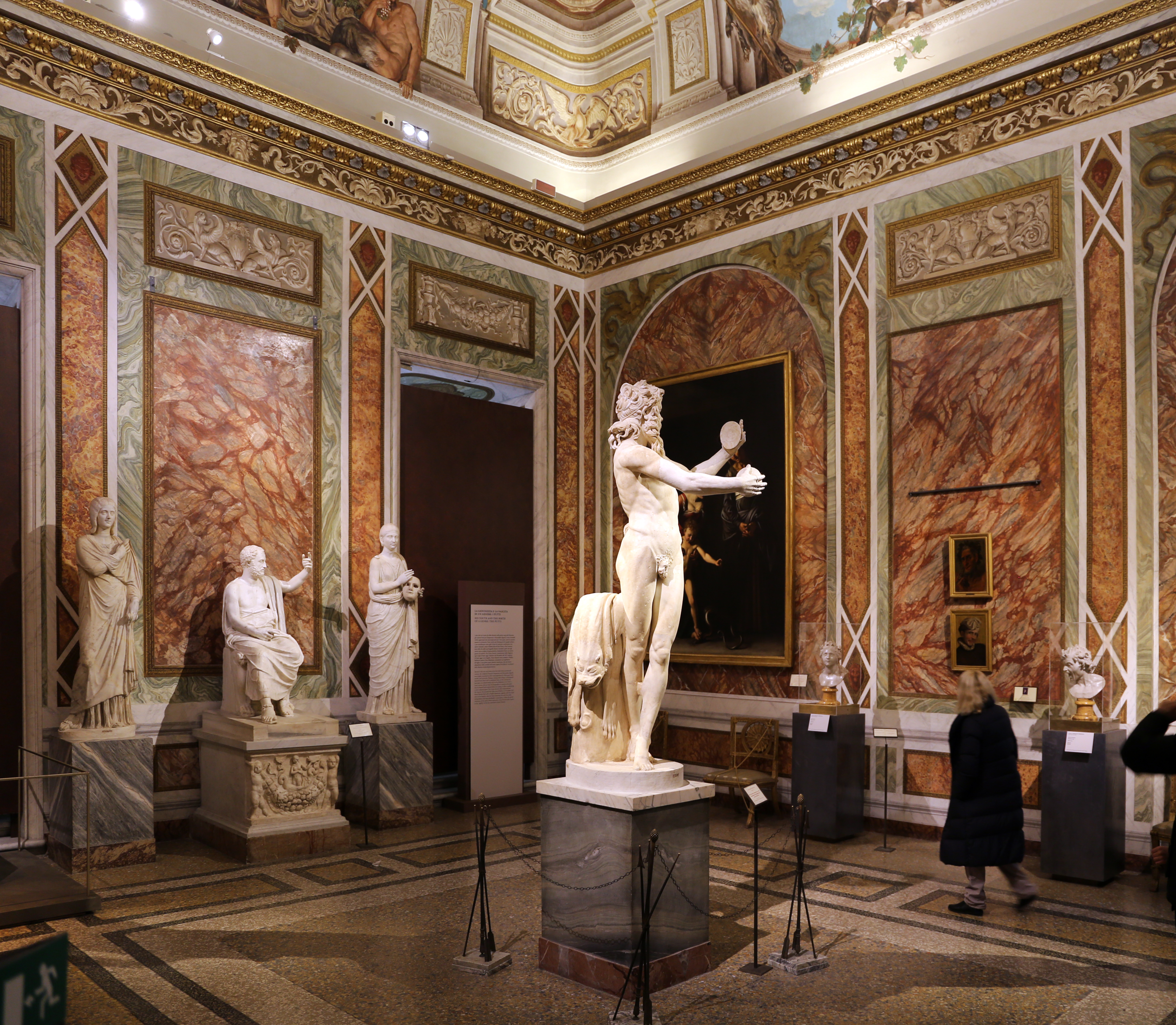
Silenus's Hall VIII

- Silenus's Hall VIII: during the rearrangement of the 18th century, Antonio Asprucci installed the group of Lysippus of Silenus carrying the infant Bacchus in the center of the hall, which then took the name of "Room of Silenus". All the decoration was then arranged on the theme of Silenus. The canvas with the Sacrifice of Silenus painted by Tommaso Conca is on the ceiling, surrounded by the monumental architectures of Giovan Battista Marchetti. Since 1834, the Dancing Satyr has replaced the Lysippos group, now in the Louvre Museum This hall is known for containing six masterpieces by Caravaggio: Boy with a Basket of Fruit, Young Sick Bacchus, Madonna and Child with Saint Anne (Dei Palafrenieri), David with the Head of Goliath, Saint Jerome, and finally Saint John the Baptist;
- Hall IX of Dido: It is entirely dedicated to Italian or foreign artists of the Renaissance, such as Pinturicchio, Bronzino, Raphael, Botticelli or Del Sarto. There are two "tondi", one by Botticelli (Madonna and Child with Angels) and one by Fra Bartolomeo (Adoration of the Child), as well as two paintings by Raphael, including the Young Woman with Unicorn. Also, a Madonna and Child by Perugino;
- Hall X of Hercules (or Hall of Sleep): This room was called the Hall of Sleep until the end of the 18th century because of the presence of a sculpture representing the allegory of sleep. Its name was later changed to the Hercules Room because of the paintings on the vault depicting the Labors of Hercules. Works by Italian Mannerists cover the walls, such as the Portrait of a Man by Parmesan, or the Danaë by Correggio. The famous painting Venus and Cupid the Honey Thief by Cranach the Elder is also there;
- Hall XI of Ganymede: the Conversion of St Paul (1545), by Garofalo is kept there;
- Hall XII of the Bacchae: It houses a Portrait of a Gentleman by Lorenzo Lotto (1535), and a Holy Family by Sodoma (1510);
- Hall XIII of Celebrity
- Hall XIV Lanfranco Gallery: this gallery was originally an open loggia from which one could admire the gardens behind the villa. Closed at the end of the 18th century, the loggia was transformed into a gallery, on this occasion the fresco of the Council of the Gods by Giovanni Lanfranco was preserved. Several works by Bernini can be seen there, as well as the terracotta statue of Louis XIV. Numerous paintings from the 17th century cover the walls, including four "tondi" by L'Albane with mythological subjects, The Prodigal Son by Guercino, as well as a self-portrait by Bernini;
- Hall XV of Aurora: The Last Supper by Bassano (1546), one of the masterpieces of Mannerist painting;
- Hall XVI of Flora: The Coral Fishing, by Jacopo Zucchi (1580), a student of Vasari, is kept there;
- Hall XVII of Gualtieri of Antwerp: It presents works by Flemish painters, such as Francken the Younger (The Antiquarian's Shop) or David Teniers the Younger (Drinker);
- Hall XVIII of Jupiter and Antiope: two of the most important works by Rubens: Susan and the Elders and Lamentation over the Dead Christ, are kept there;
- Hall XIX of Paris and Helen: five paintings on the vault illustrate the episodes of the Trojan prince Paris. Among the many paintings, we will remember those of Domenichino (Hunt of Diana, 1617), Annibale Carracci (Jupiter and Juno, 1602) and Giovanni Lanfranco (Norandino and Lucina surprised by the ogre, 1624);
- Hall XX of Psyche (or Hall of the Centaur): the ceiling from the 18th century represents the loves of Eros and Psyche. The room is dedicated to the great Venetian masters of the 15th and 16th centuries: Giorgione (Passionate chorister, 1507), Titian (the Sacred and Profane Love, 1514), Veronese, Carpaccio, Giovanni Bellini, Lorenzo Lotto, but also the Sicilian Antonello of Messina (Portrait of a Man, 1475).

== Nearby museums ==
Also in Villa Borghese gardens or nearby are the Galleria Nazionale d'Arte Moderna, which specialises in 19th- and 20th-century Italian art, and Museo Nazionale Etrusco, a collection of pre-Roman objects, mostly Etruscan, excavated around Rome.

== Gallery ==
=== Sculptures ===
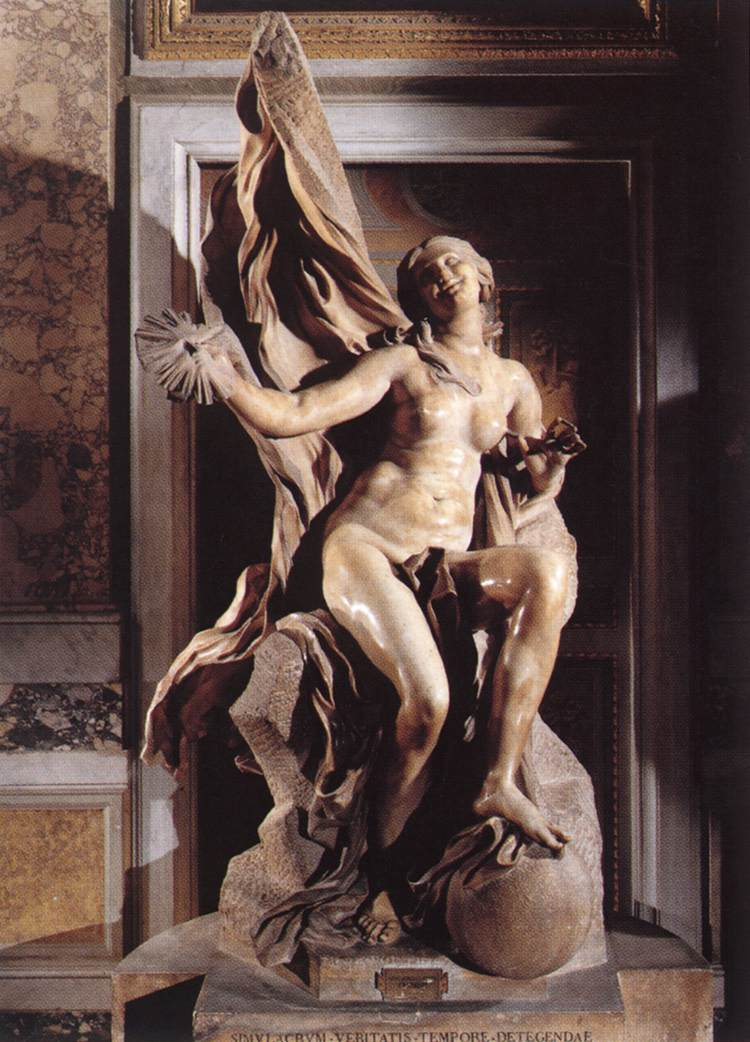
Truth Unveiled by Time by Bernini, c. 1645–1652

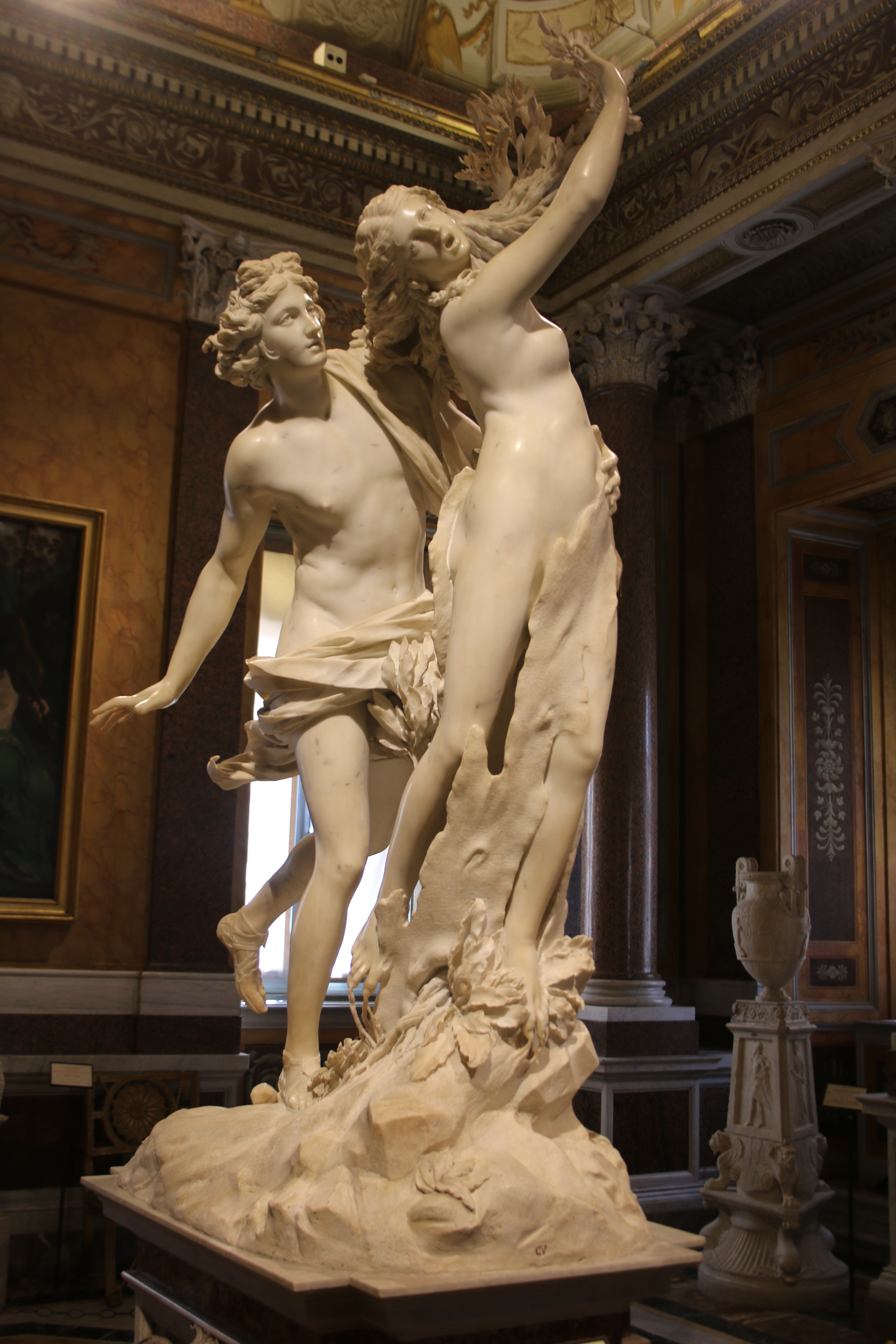
Apollo and Daphne by Bernini, c. 1622

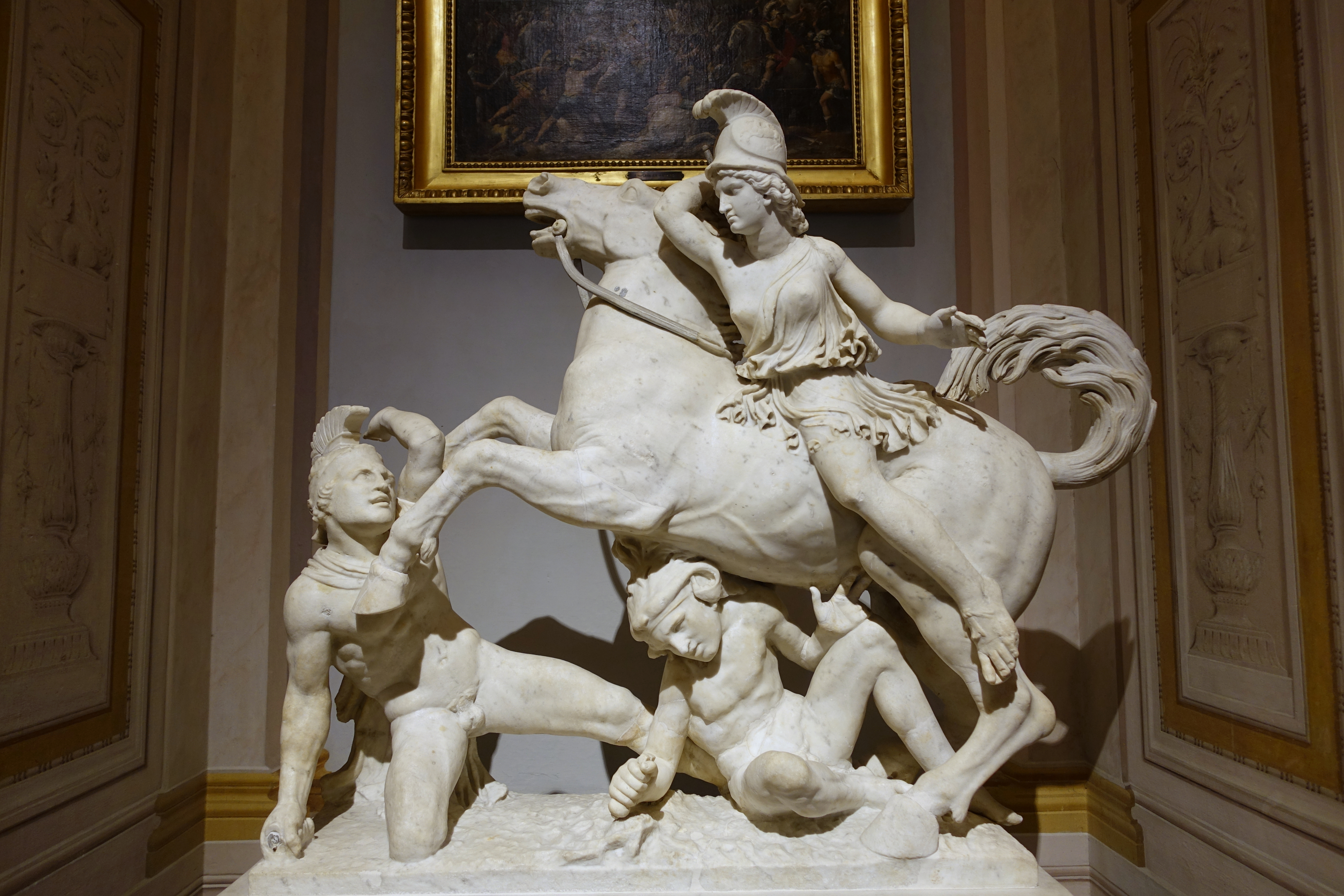
Amazonomachy - sculpture group with an Amazon attacking a Barbarian and a Greek, c. 160 AD, Roman copy of Greek original

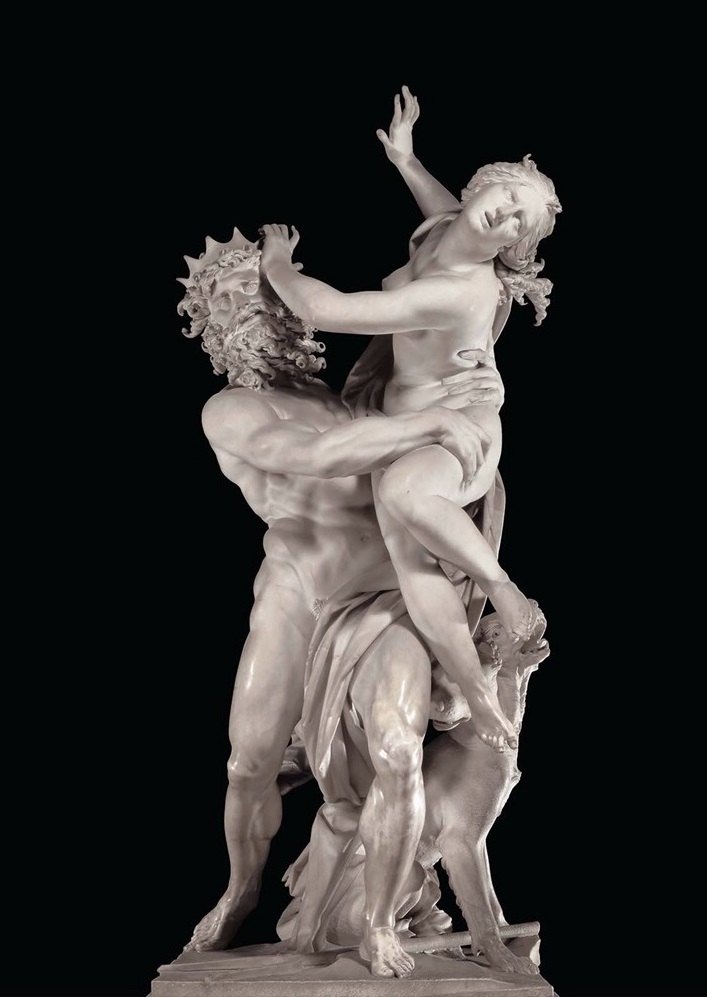
The Rape of Proserpina by Bernini, c. 1621

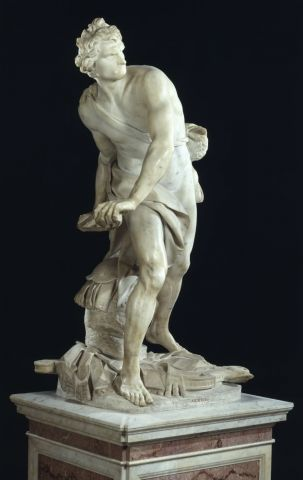
David by Bernini, c. 1623–1624

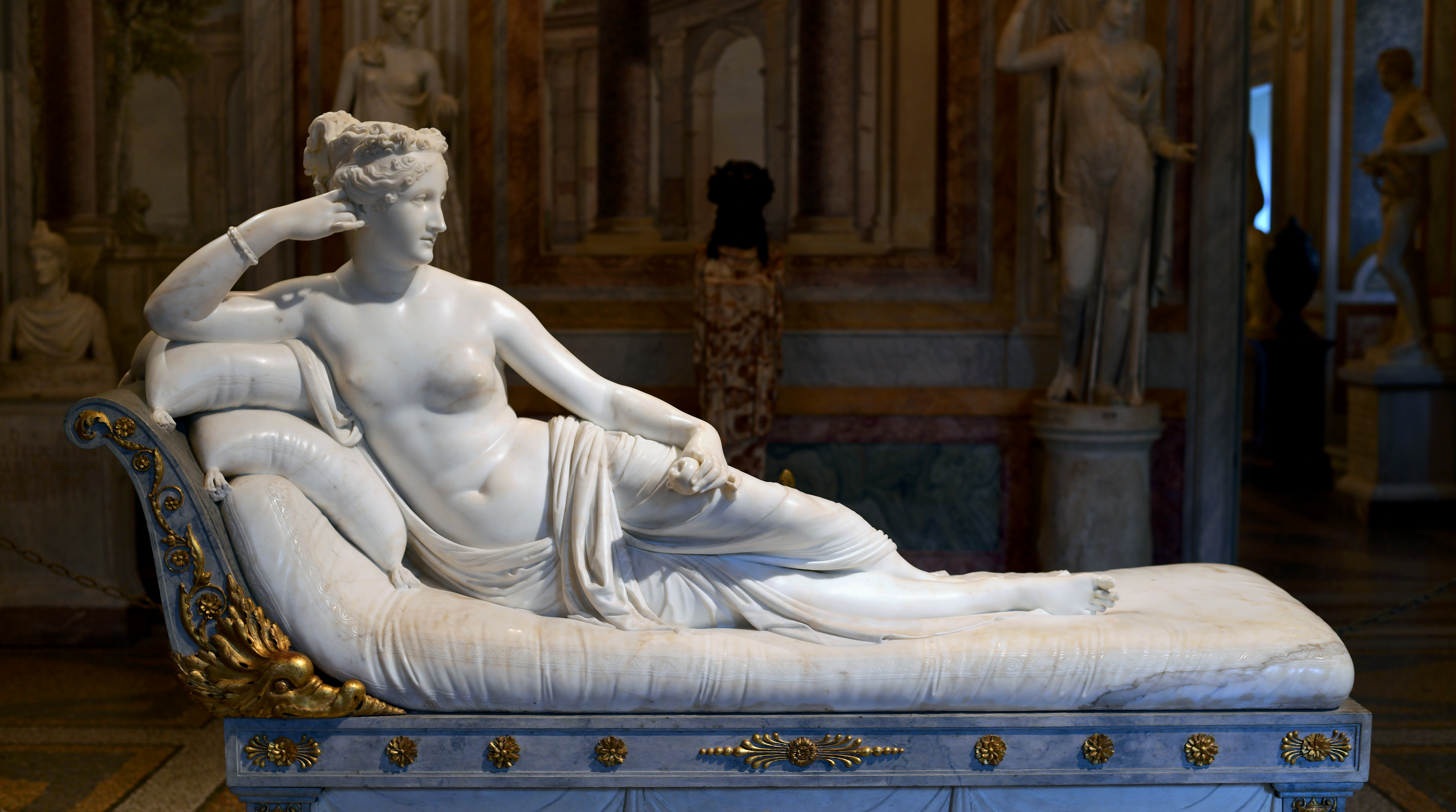
Venus Victrix by Antonio Canova, c. 1805–1808

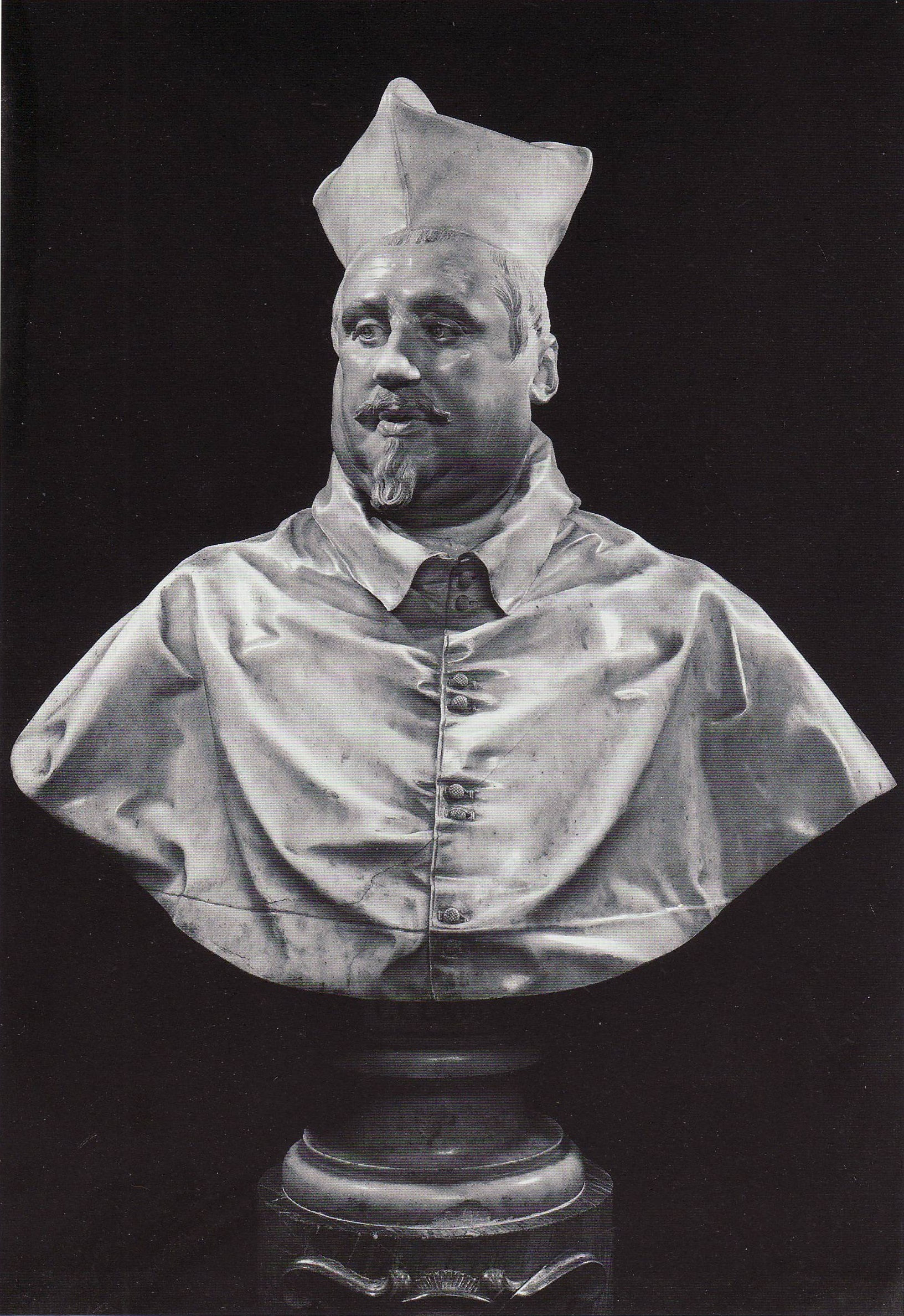
Bust of Scipione Borghese by Bernini, c. 1632

=== Paintings ===
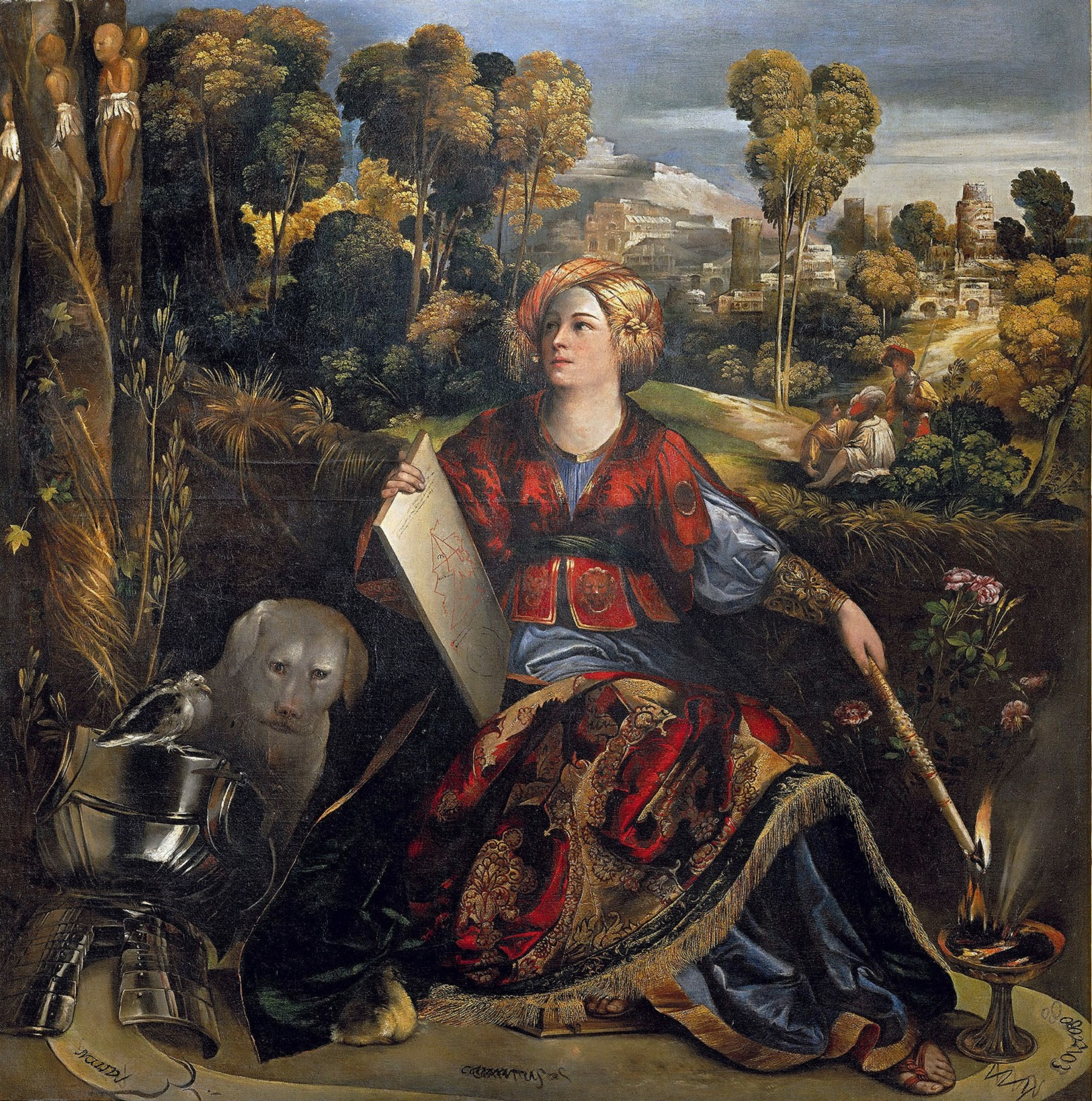
Melissa by Dosso Dossi, c. 1507

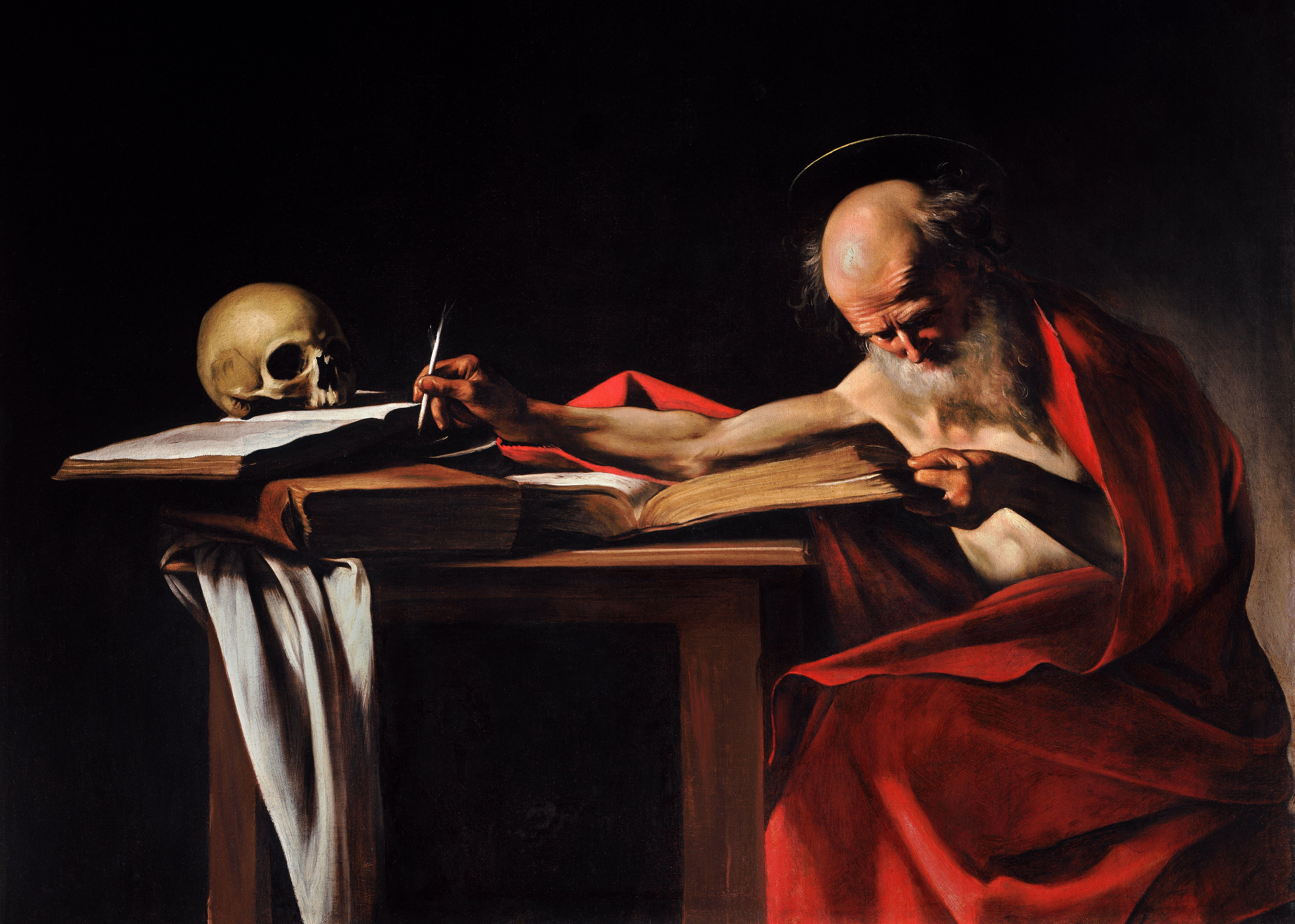
Saint Jerome Writing by Caravaggio, c. 1606

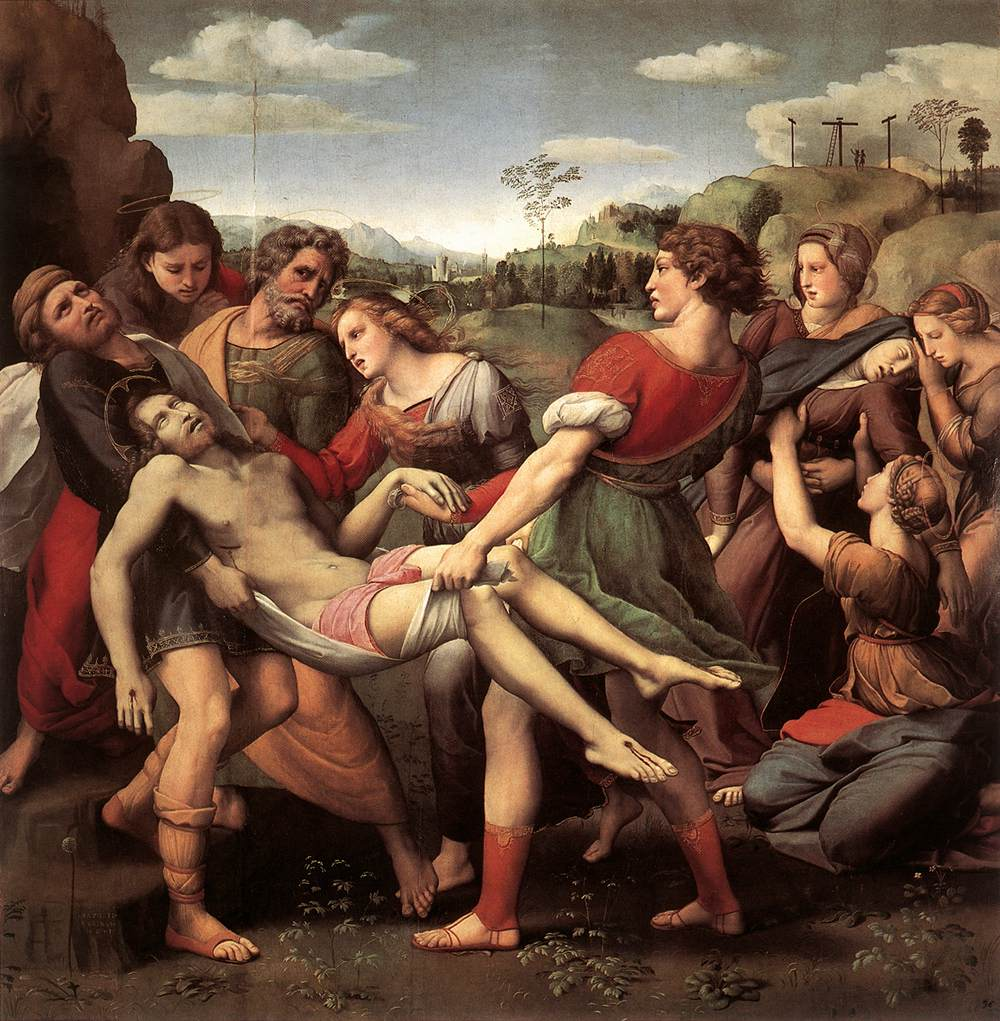
The Deposition by Raphael, c. 1507

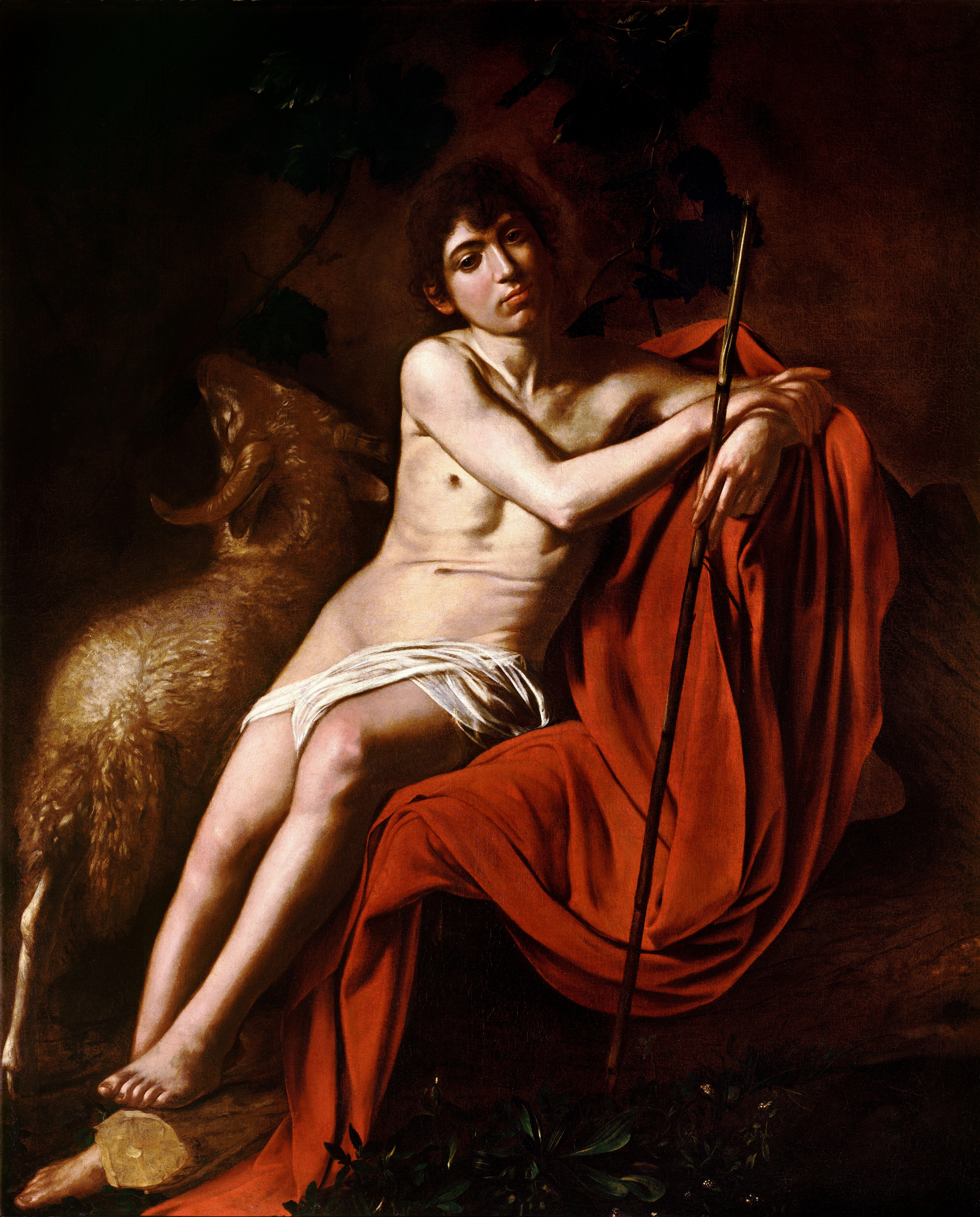
St John the Baptist by Caravaggio, c. 1610

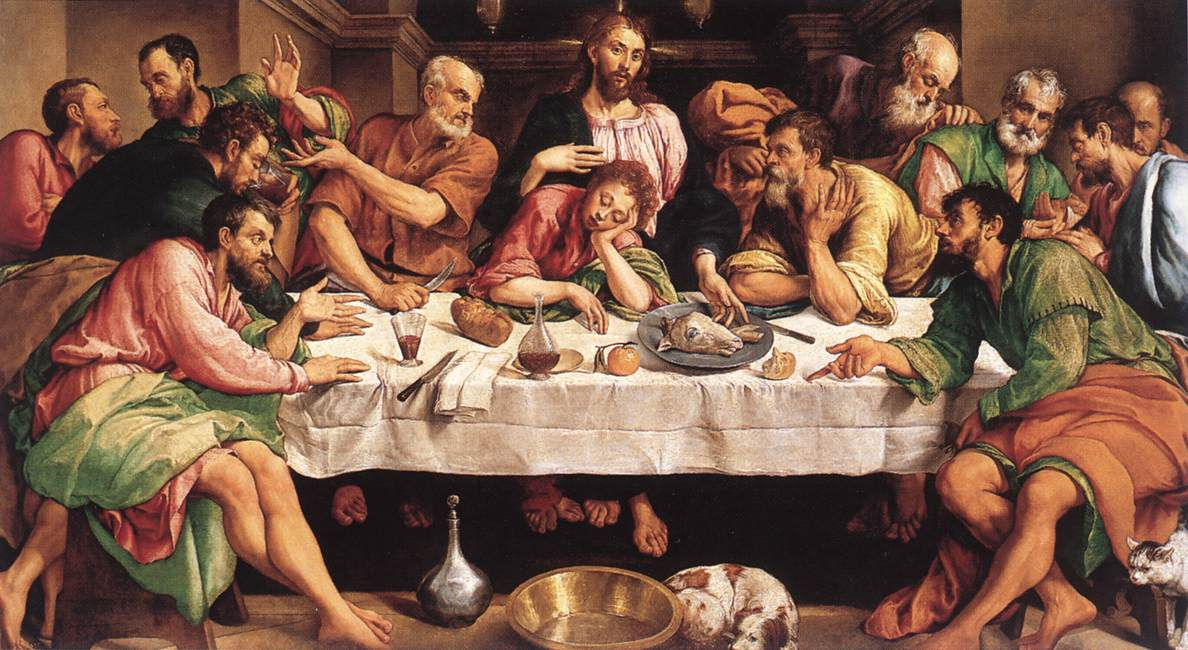
The Last Supper by Jacopo Bassano, c. 1546

Madonna and the Serpent by Caravaggio, c. 1605–1606

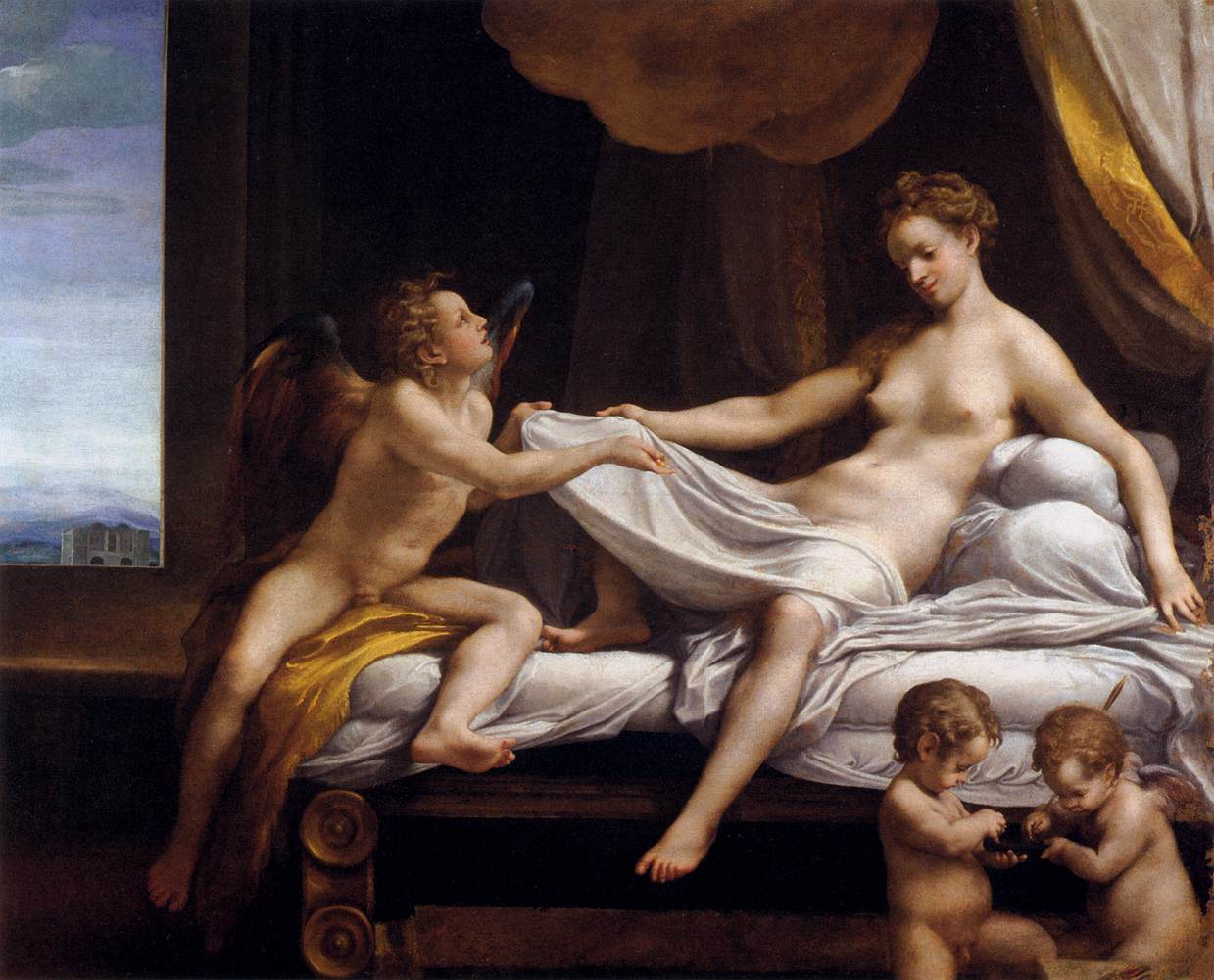
Danaë by Correggio, c. 1530

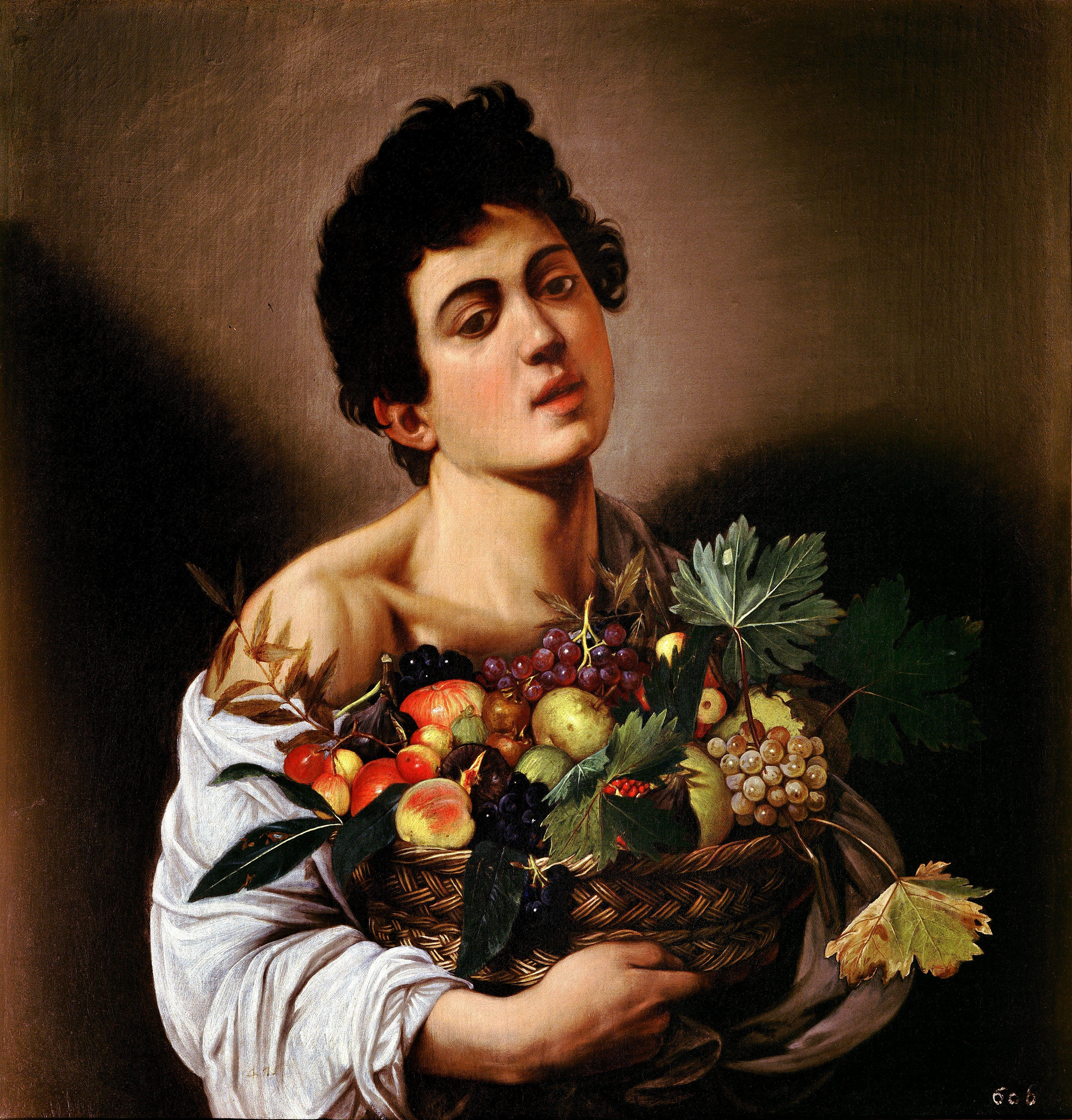
Boy with a Basket of Fruit by Caravaggio, c. 1593

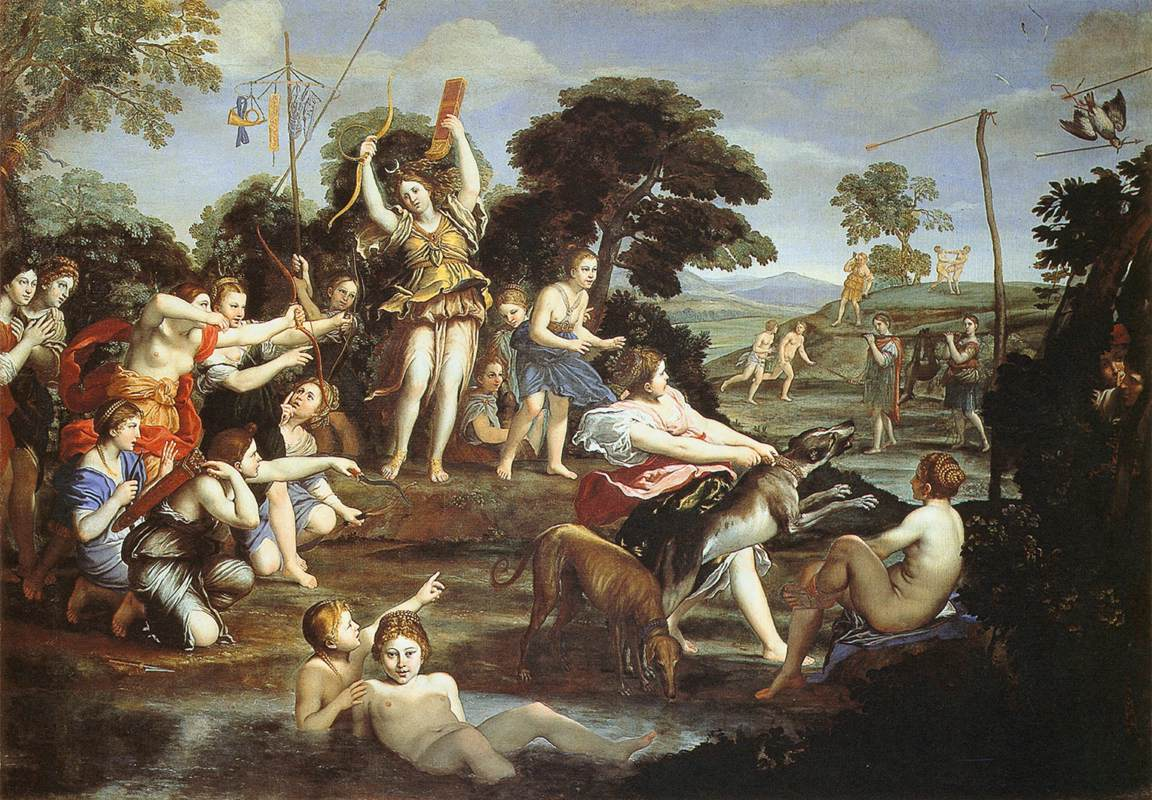
Archery Contest of Diana and her Nymphs by Domenichino, c. 1616–1617

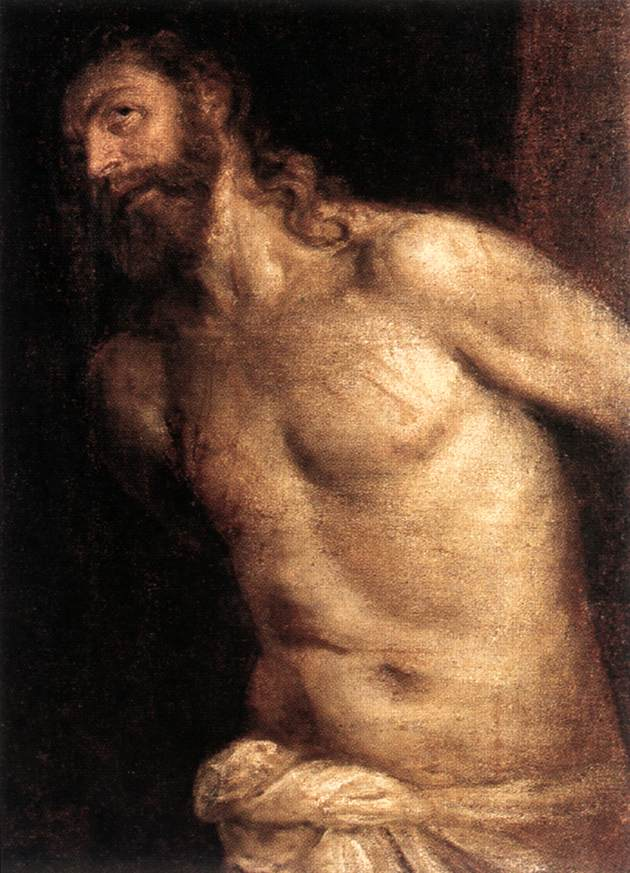
The Scourging of Christ by Titian, c. 1560

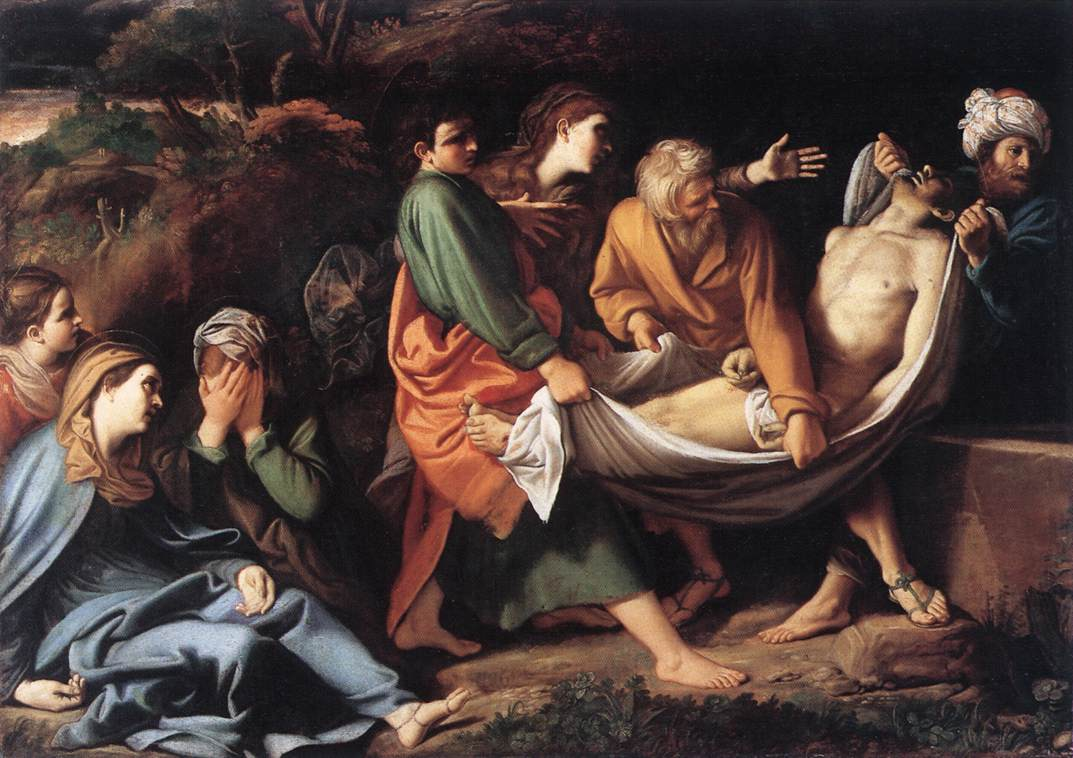
Deposition by Sisto Badalocchio, c. 1610

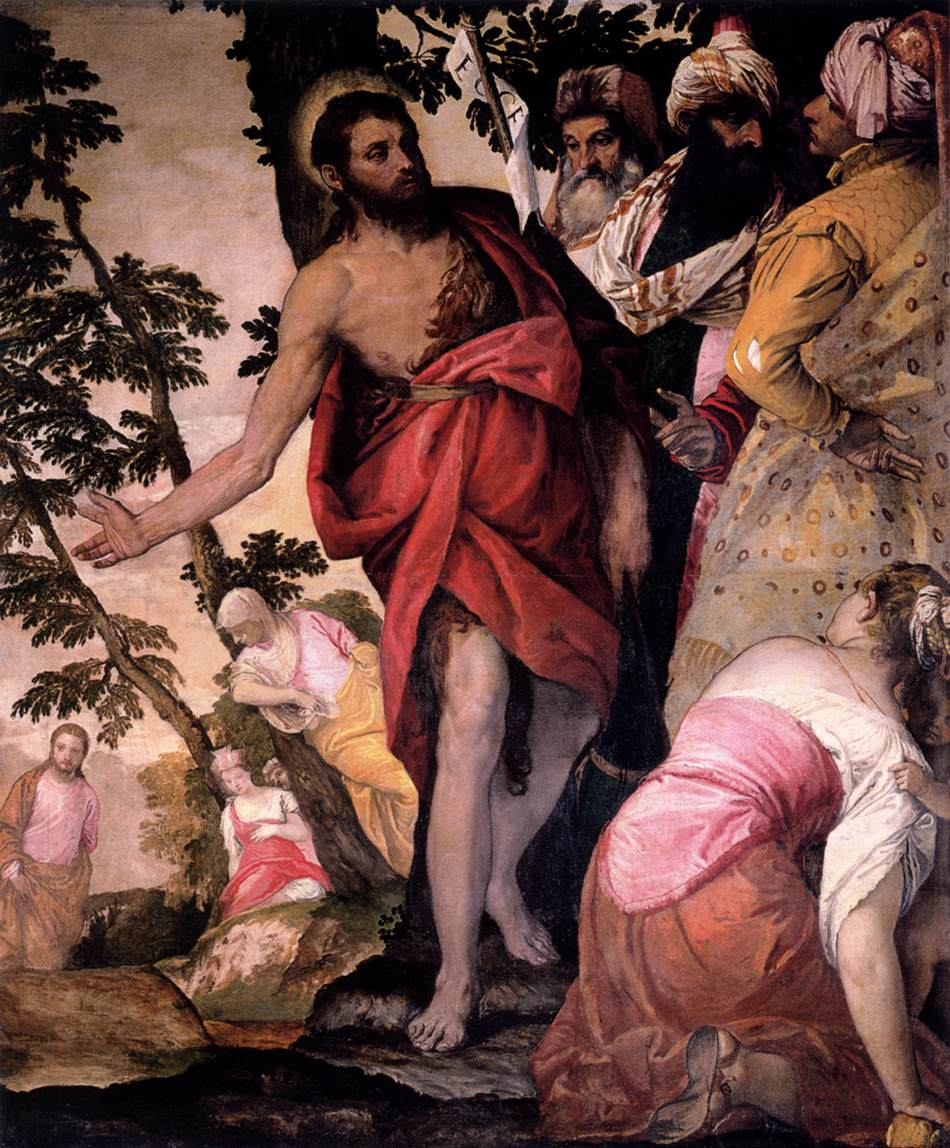
Saint John the Baptist Preaching by Paolo Veronese, c. 1562

The Deposition by Peter Paul Rubens, c. 1602

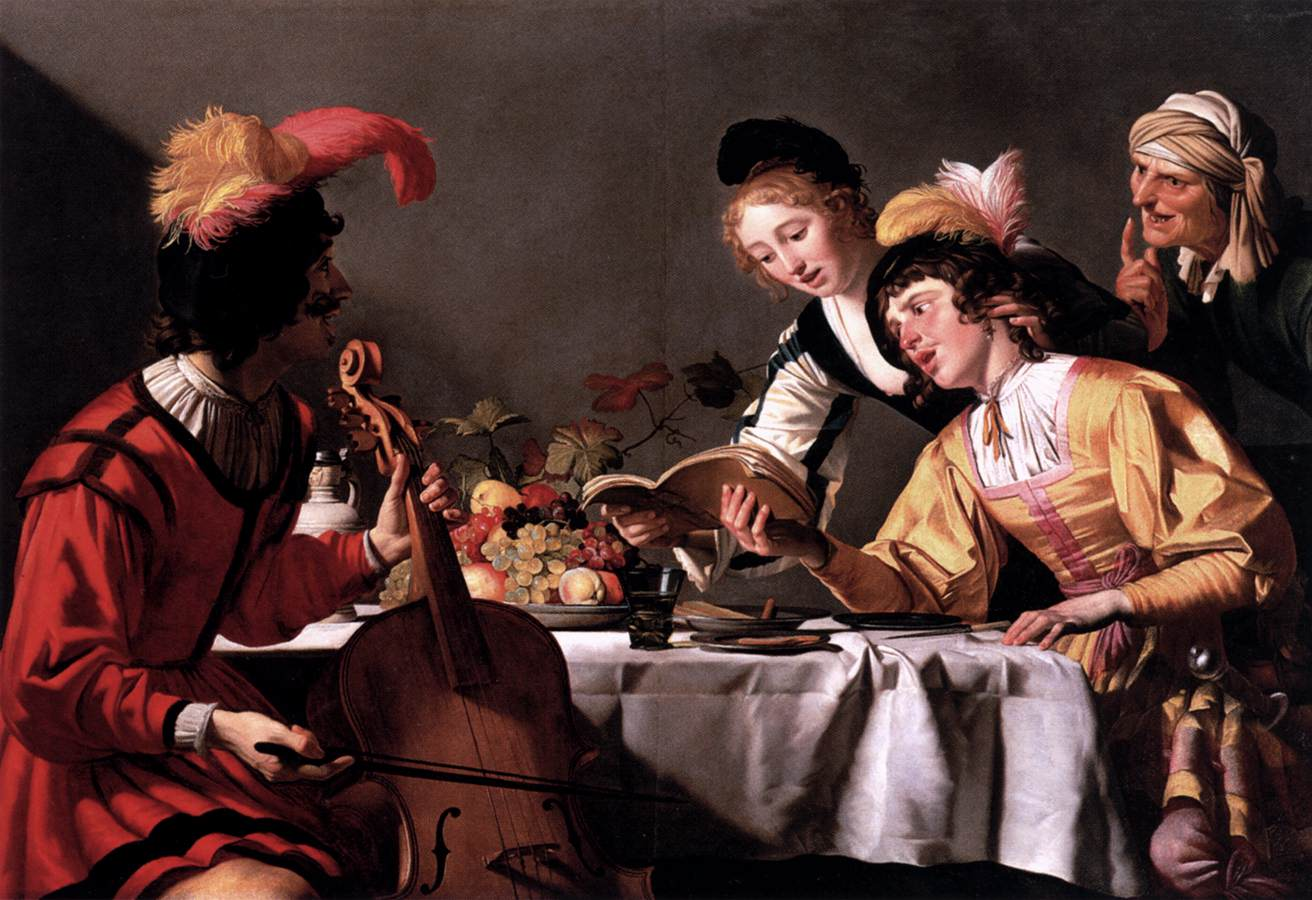
The Concert by Gerrit van Honthorst, c. 1626–1630

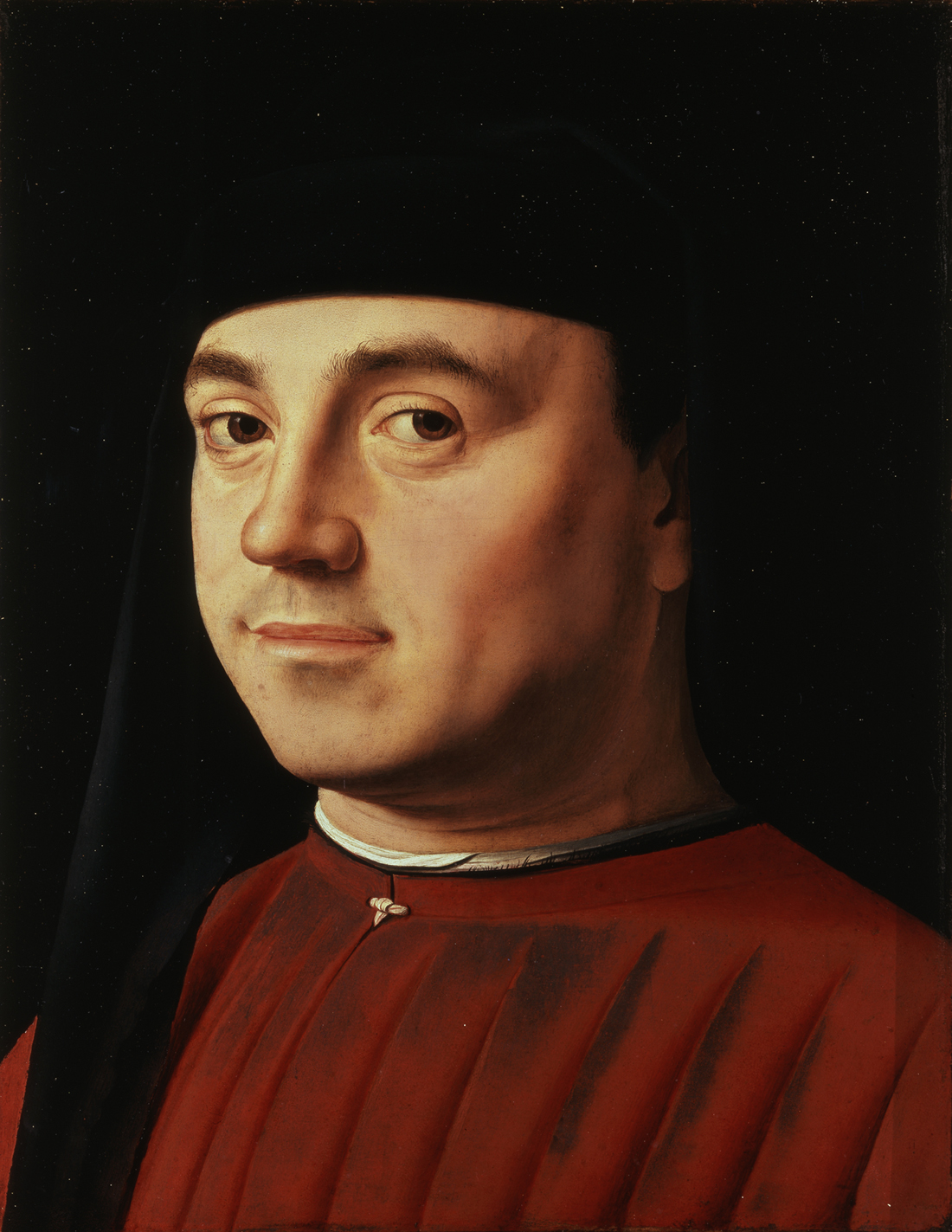
Portrait of a Man by Antonello da Messina, c. 1474–1475

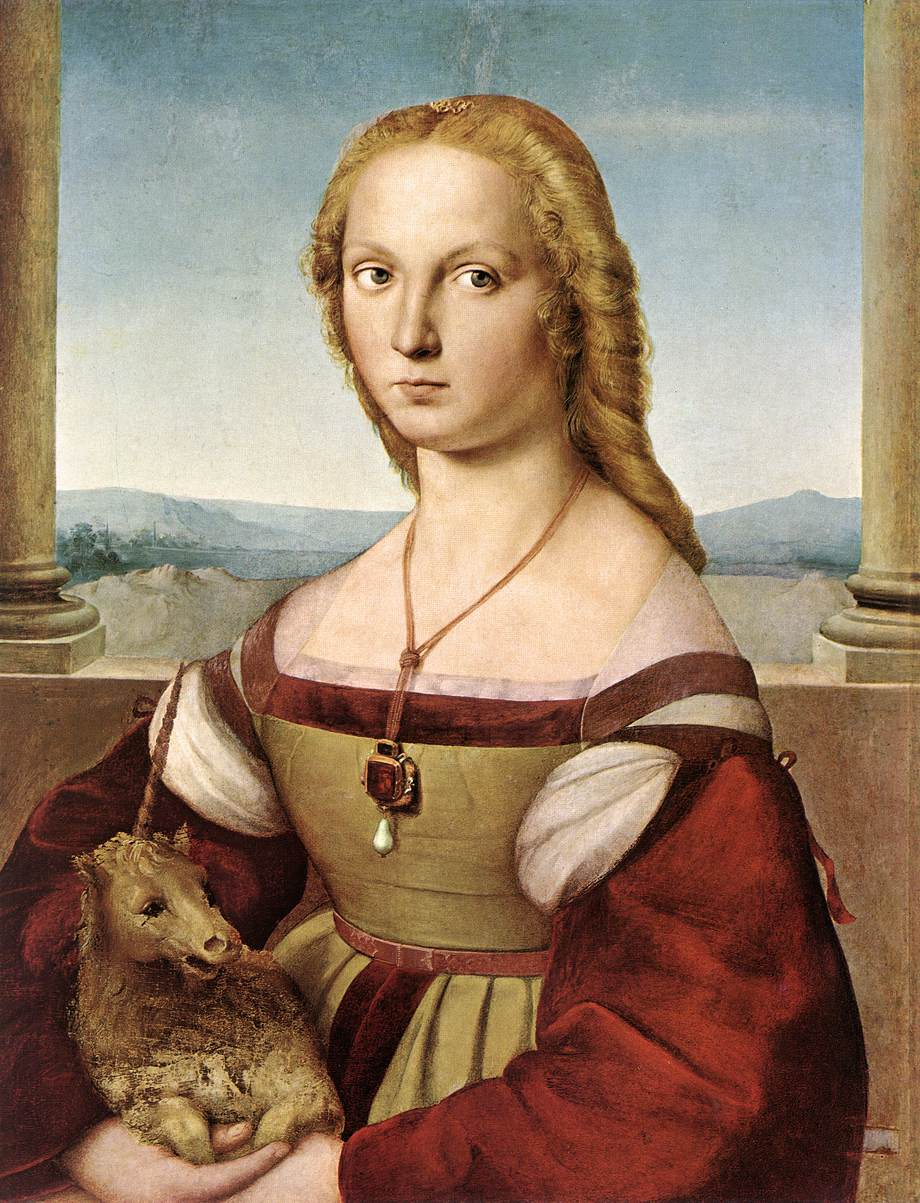
Young Woman with Unicorn by Raphael, c. 1505

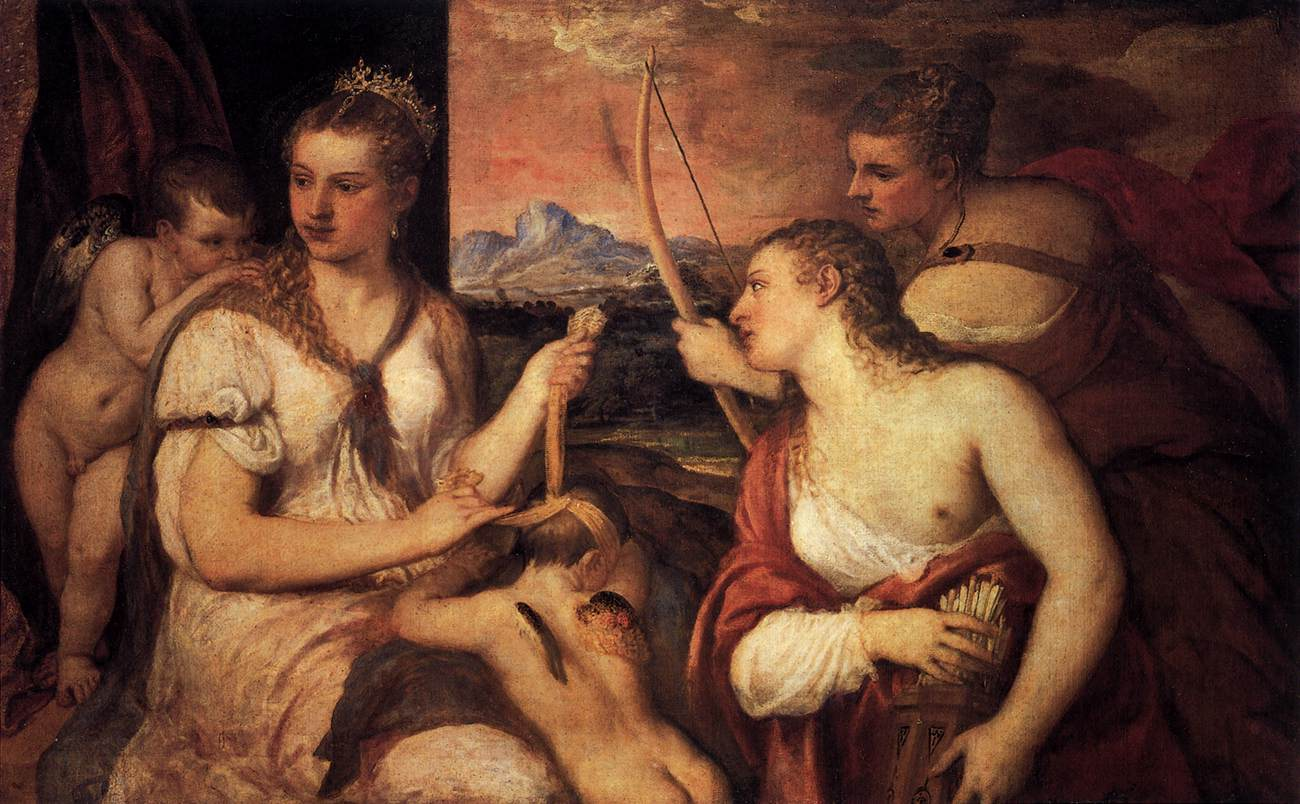
Venus Blindfolding Cupid by Titian, c. 1565

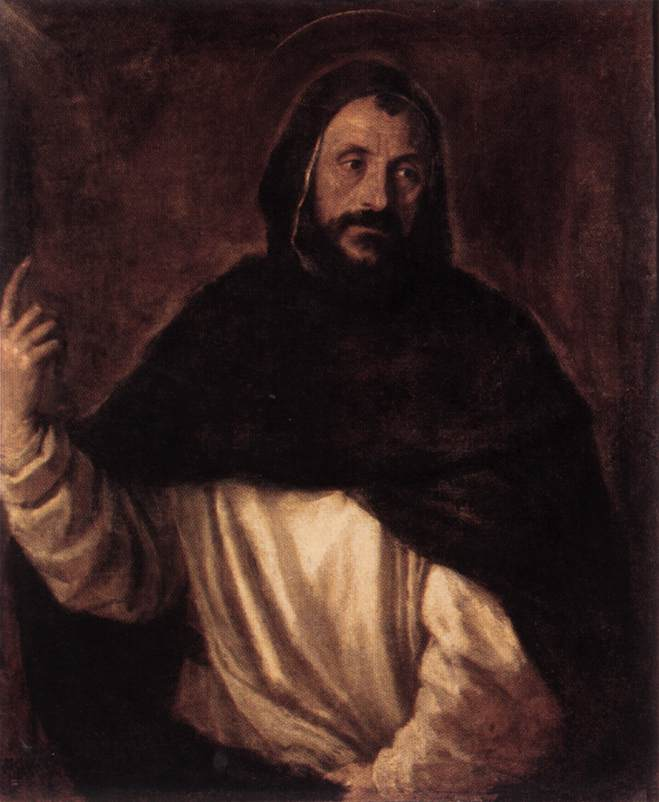
Saint Dominic by Titian, c. 1565

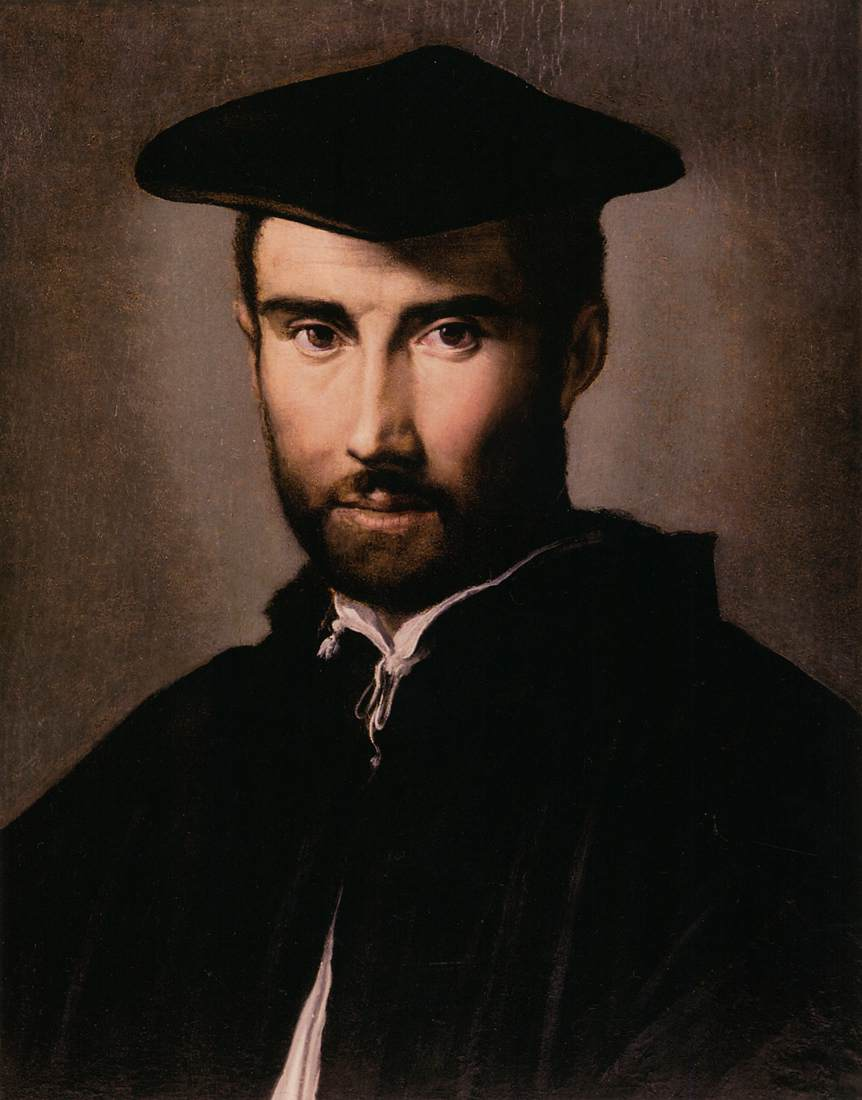
Portrait of Pianerlotto by Parmigianino, c. 1528

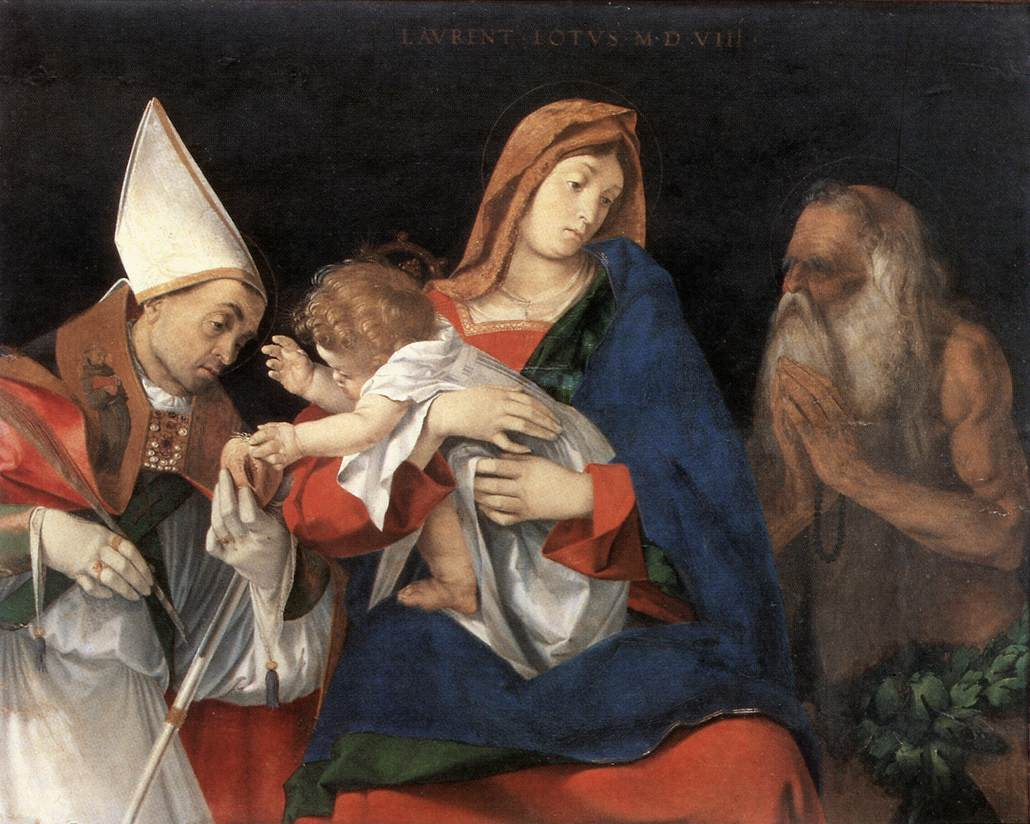
Madonna with Child between Sts. Flavian and Onuphrius by Lorenzo Lotto, c. 1508

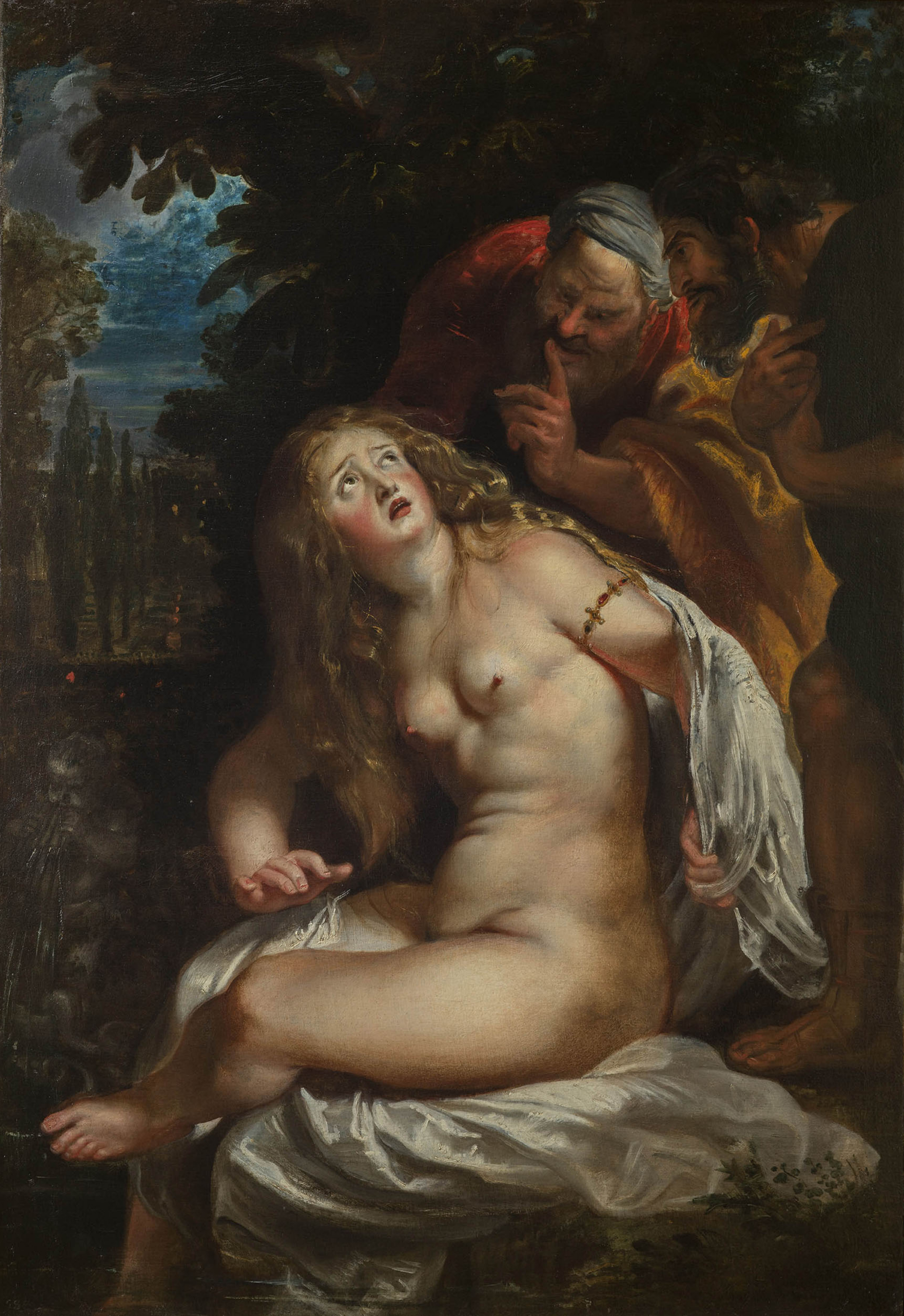
Susanna and The Elders by Peter Paul Rubens, c. 1607–1608

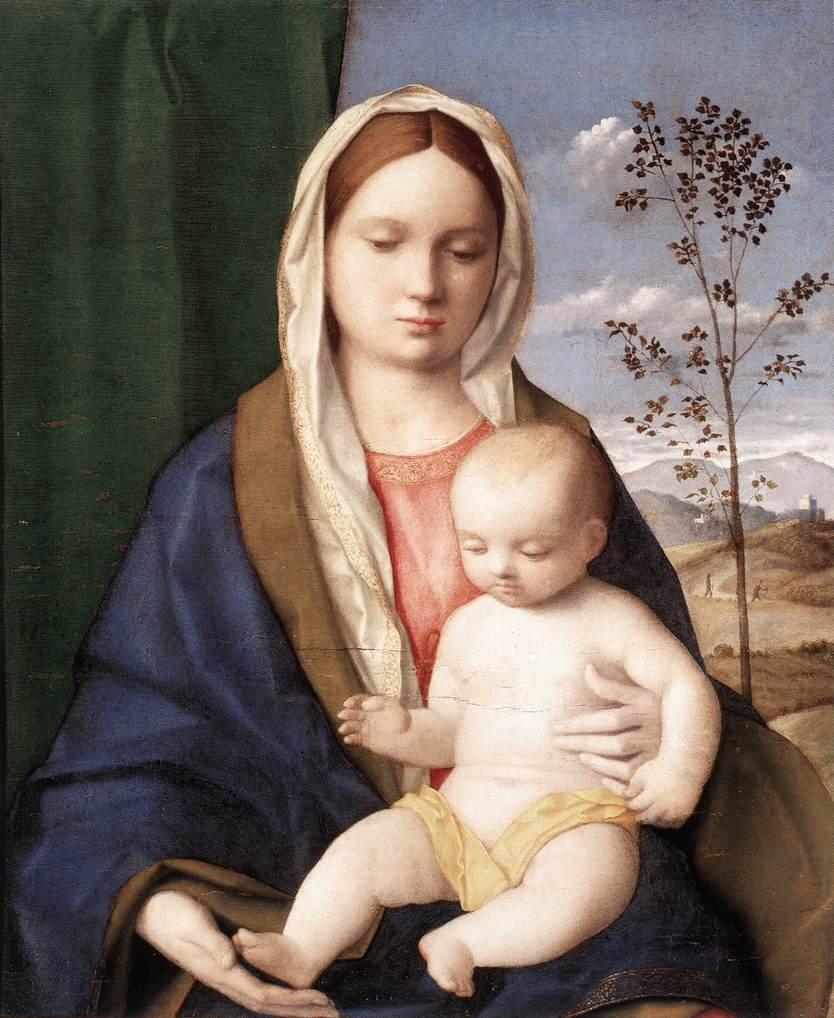
Madonna and Child by Giovanni Bellini, c. 1510

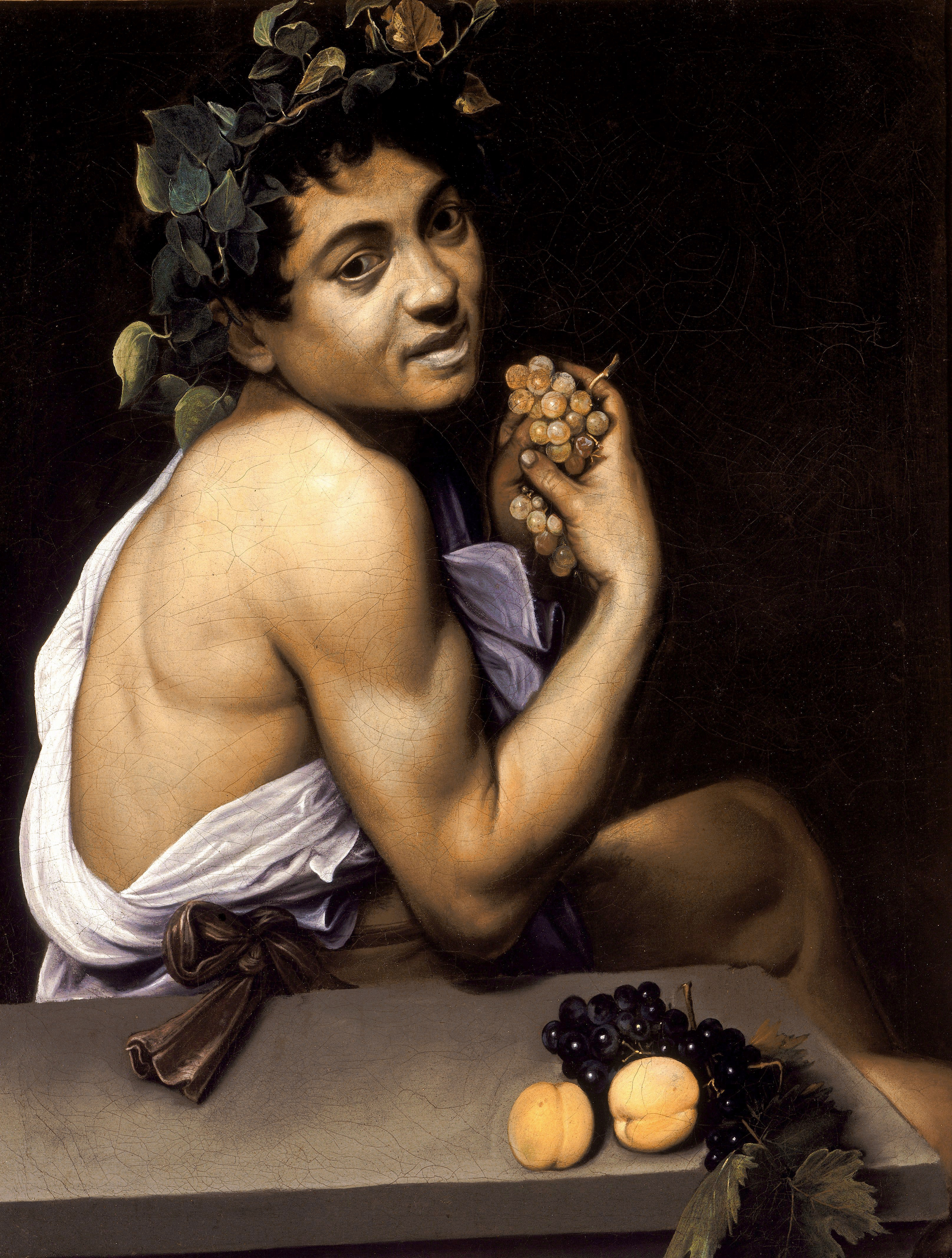
Young Sick Bacchus by Caravaggio, c. 1593

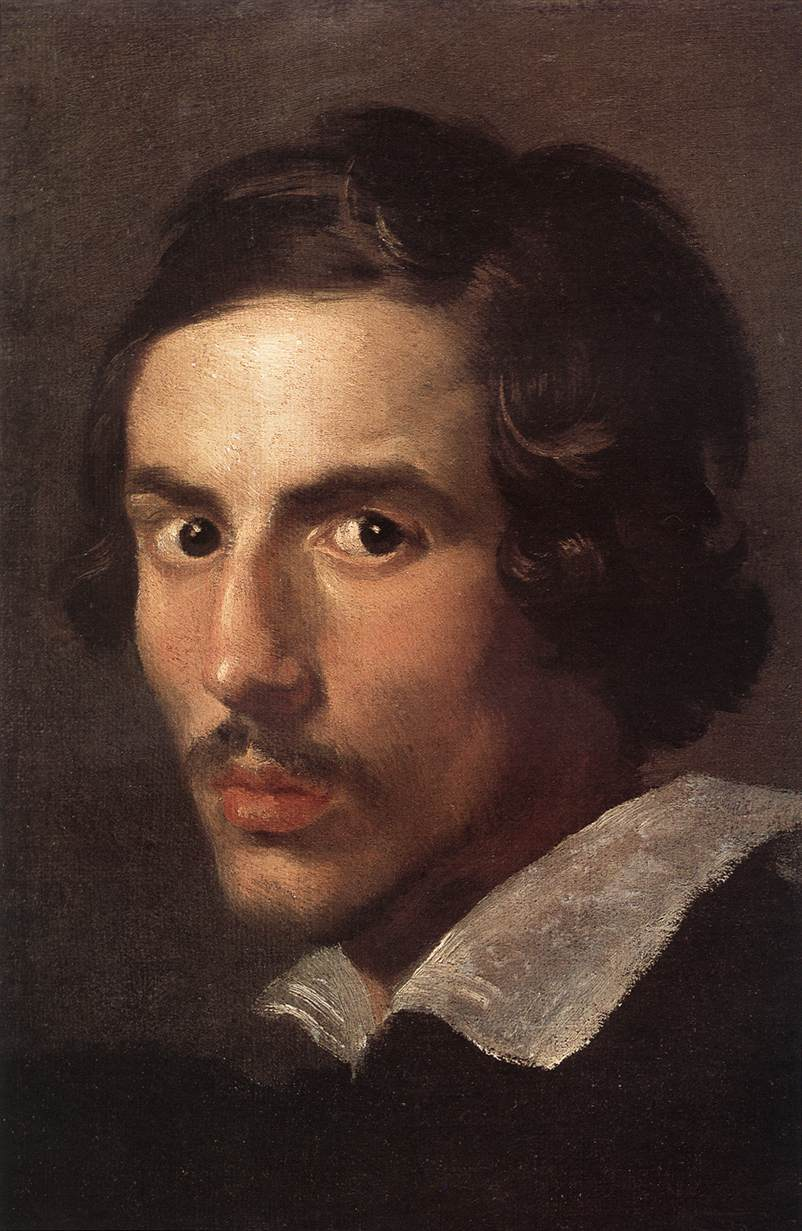
Self Portrait by Gian Lorenzo Bernini, c. 1623

== Sources ==
- Barchiesi, Sofia; Minozzi, Marina (2006). La Galerie Borghèse : Ses chefs-d'œuvre (in French). Florence: Scala. ISBN 978-88-8117-163-7.
- Melchiorri, Giuseppe (1836). Guida metodica di Roma e suoi contorni (in Italian). Rome: Giovanni Gallarini. OCLC 863361584.

Preceded by Doria Pamphilj Gallery	Landmarks of Rome; Galleria Borghese	Succeeded by Galleria Comunale d'Arte Moderna, Rome
