= The Deposition (Rubens) =

1602 painting by Peter Paul Rubens

- Artist: Peter Paul Rubens
- Year: 1601-1602
- Medium: Oil on canvas
- Dimensions: 180 cm × 137 cm (71 in × 54 in)
- Location: Galleria Borghese, Rome

The Deposition also known as the Lamentation over the Dead Christ or the Entombment is a painting by Peter Paul Rubens in the collection of the Galleria Borghese in Rome which interprets an episode from the Gospels. It dates to Rubens' first stay in Rome around 1601/02 and was previously attributed to Anthony van Dyck.

== Description ==
The composition shows a small group of mourners around the dead body of Jesus. Jesus' naked body is displayed in a sitting pose diagonally across a carved stone sarcophagus. The sarcophagus, adorned with classical figures, may symbolise the Antique culture, which is about to be replaced by Christ's new message, and may also refer to the sacrament of the altar, i.e. the Eucharist. Behind Christ is the Virgin Mary against whom Christ's body is leaning. She is portrayed in dark attire with a dignified sorrow as she gazes upward for help in understanding the meaning of the recent events that she has witnessed. To her left side is John the Evangelist, dressed in red. He is supporting both Christ and the Virgin Mary as an embodiment of love and sacrifice.

On the far right is a young woman with long blond hair, one breast exposed, her head bowed and her hand raised. She is wiping tears from her eyes. This figure, likely representing Mary Magdalene, heightens the emotional impact of the scene. At her feet is another figure, perhaps a younger woman or child, buried in the folds of drapery and leaning against Christ's legs. This figure intensifies the sense of collective grief. On the left side of the scene, an older man with a gray beard, possibly Joseph of Arimathea or Nicodemus, is looking at Christ. His sober demeanor contrasts with the emotionally charged figures on the right, indicating he is a reflective witness to the burial. He represents the larger group of disciples and followers facing a crisis of faith.

== Attribution and dating ==
The artwork was first recorded in the 1833 Inventario Fidecommissario related to the Borghese Collection, in which it was referred to as 'the Deposition of the Cross, by Vendich'. The initial attribution to Van Dyck stemmed from an 18th or 19th-century inscription on the canvas. The art historian Rudolf Oldenbourg re-attributed the work in 1916 to Rubens and dated it to around 1605, the period of Rubens' second stay in Rome. The attribution to Rubens has since been generally accepted. At present art historians generally date the work to about 1601-1602 which is the period of Rubens' first stay in Rome. This dating is supported by observations about the proportions of the figures and similarities to the Virgin in the Deposition and a Virgin in an altarpiece completed by Rubens in that time period.

== Provenance ==
The circumstances in which the painting entered the Borghese Collection are still debated, with some suggesting it was a commission from Cardinal Peretti di Montalto to Scipione. However, it was confirmed that Camillo Borghese purchased it in the early 19th century. Recent research has linked this painting to one owned in the 1690s by the Roman-based British art dealer James Durno, which may provide further insight into its provenance.

The work was purchased by the Italian state in 1902.
