= Susanna and the Elders (Rubens) =

Painting by Peter Paul Rubens in Rome

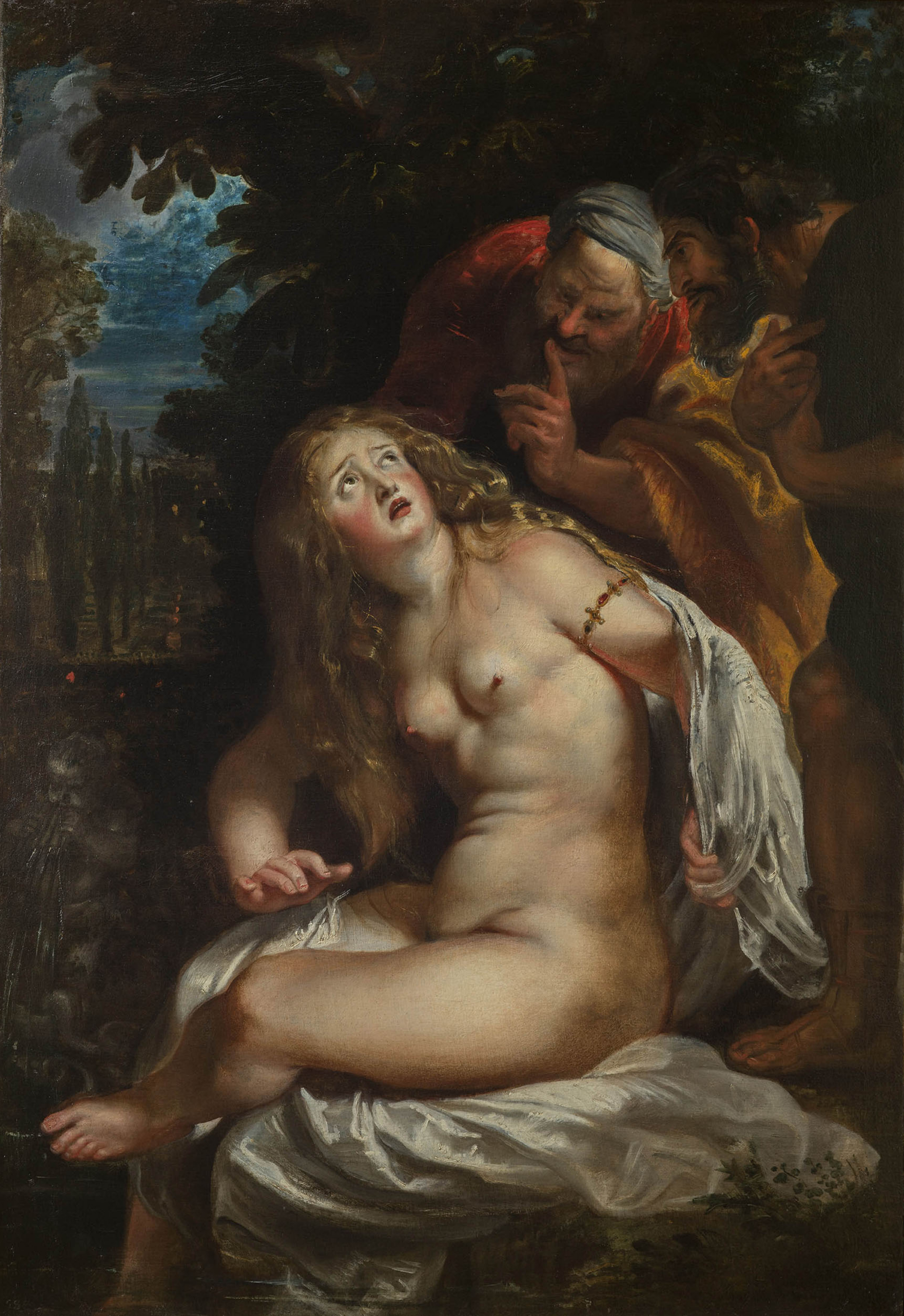
- Artist: Peter Paul Rubens
- Year: 1607
- Medium: Oil on canvas
- Dimensions: 94 cm × 65 cm (37 in × 26 in)
- Location: Borghese Gallery, Rome

Susanna and the Elders is a painting by the Flemish artist Peter Paul Rubens executed in 1607 during his second stay in Rome, Italy. It is in the collection of the Galleria Borghese in Rome since at least the mid-17th century,. This is oldest treatment by Rubens of this subject, to which he returned multiple times. These versions include a youthful work from 1608, in Real Academia de Bellas Artes de San Fernando, in Madrid, a late period work in the Alte Pinakothek and other autograph versions some of which are lost, as well as workshop versions.

== Subject of the painting ==
The painting is based on the story of Susanna as recounted in the additions to the Book of Daniel of the Hebrew Bible which are accepted by the Catholic Church, Oriental Orthodox Churches, Eastern Orthodox Churches, and the Assyrian Church of the East. According to the story, a young, virtuous woman is bathing in her garden when two men (the so-called "elders") catch each other spying on her. Driven by lust, they accost her and demand she have sexual intercourse with them. When she refuses, they accuse her of adultery, a crime then punishable by death. Brought to trial, she is condemned to death, but is saved thanks to Daniel's intervention. The men are then sentenced to death themselves.

Rubens depicts the episode in the story when the lecherous elders approach the young woman from behind and surprise her while she is sitting naked on a rock with only a flimsy scarf around her shoulders. Turning her head backwards to face them, she looks up to them with her lips parted and an expression of shock, fair and shame. One of the elders has his index finger on his lips to indicate she should remain silent while the other elder points with his index behind him where they would likely want to have their way with her. The figures are situated underneath a tree. On the lower left behind them is a fountain in the form of a putto blowing a flute and in the background is a classic park with trees.

== Other versions and copies ==
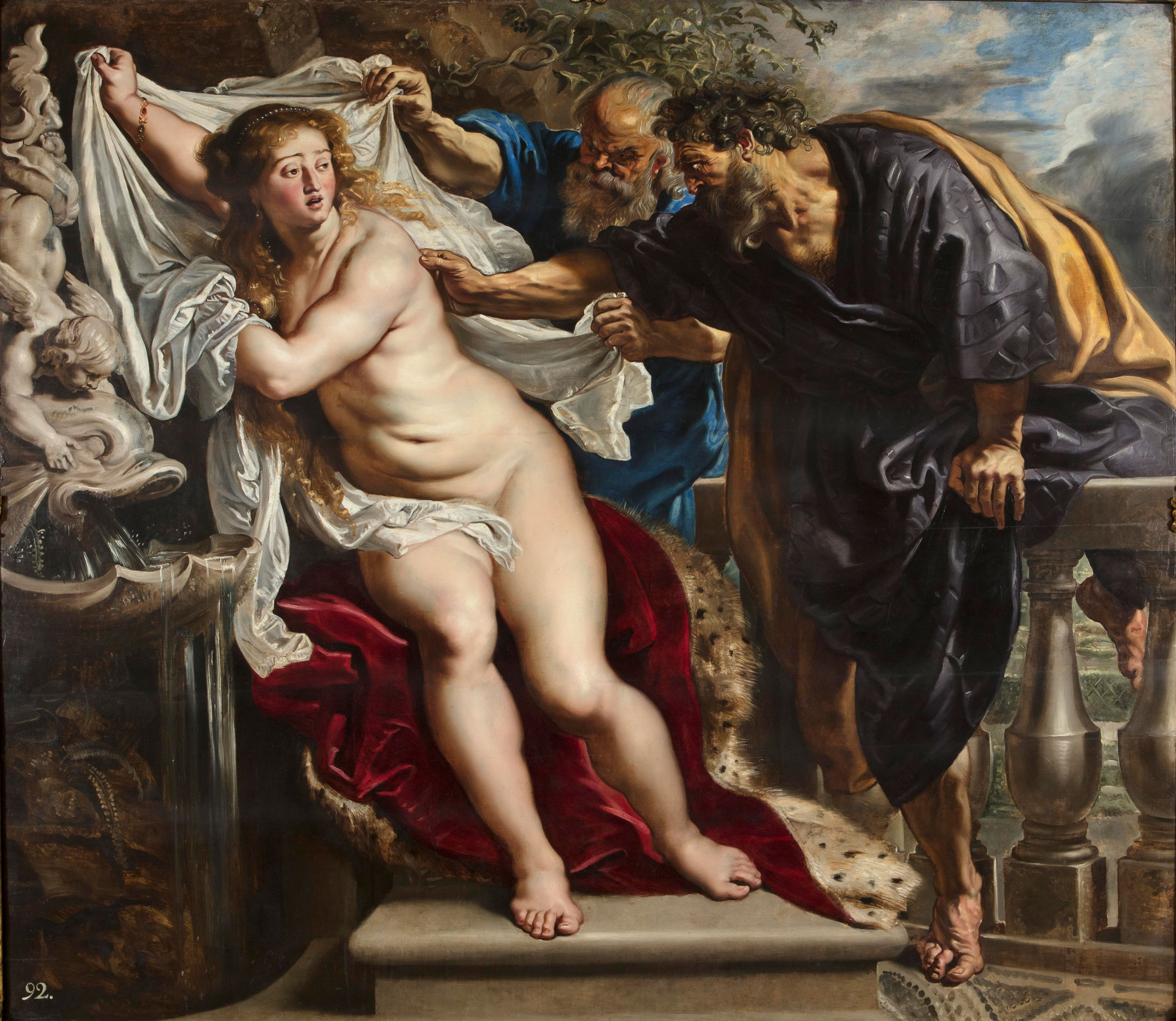
Royal Academy of Fine Arts of San Fernando

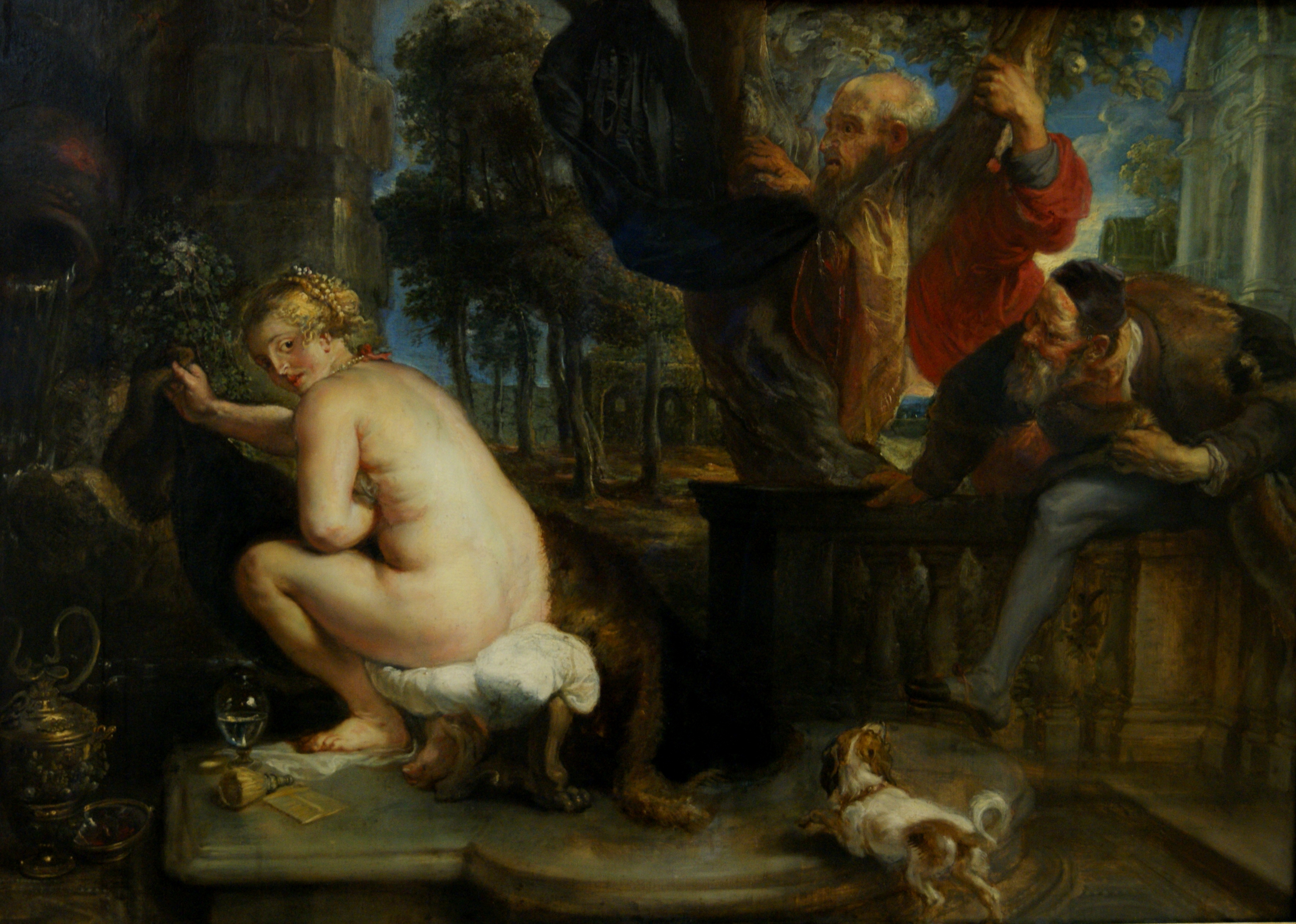
Alte Pinakothek

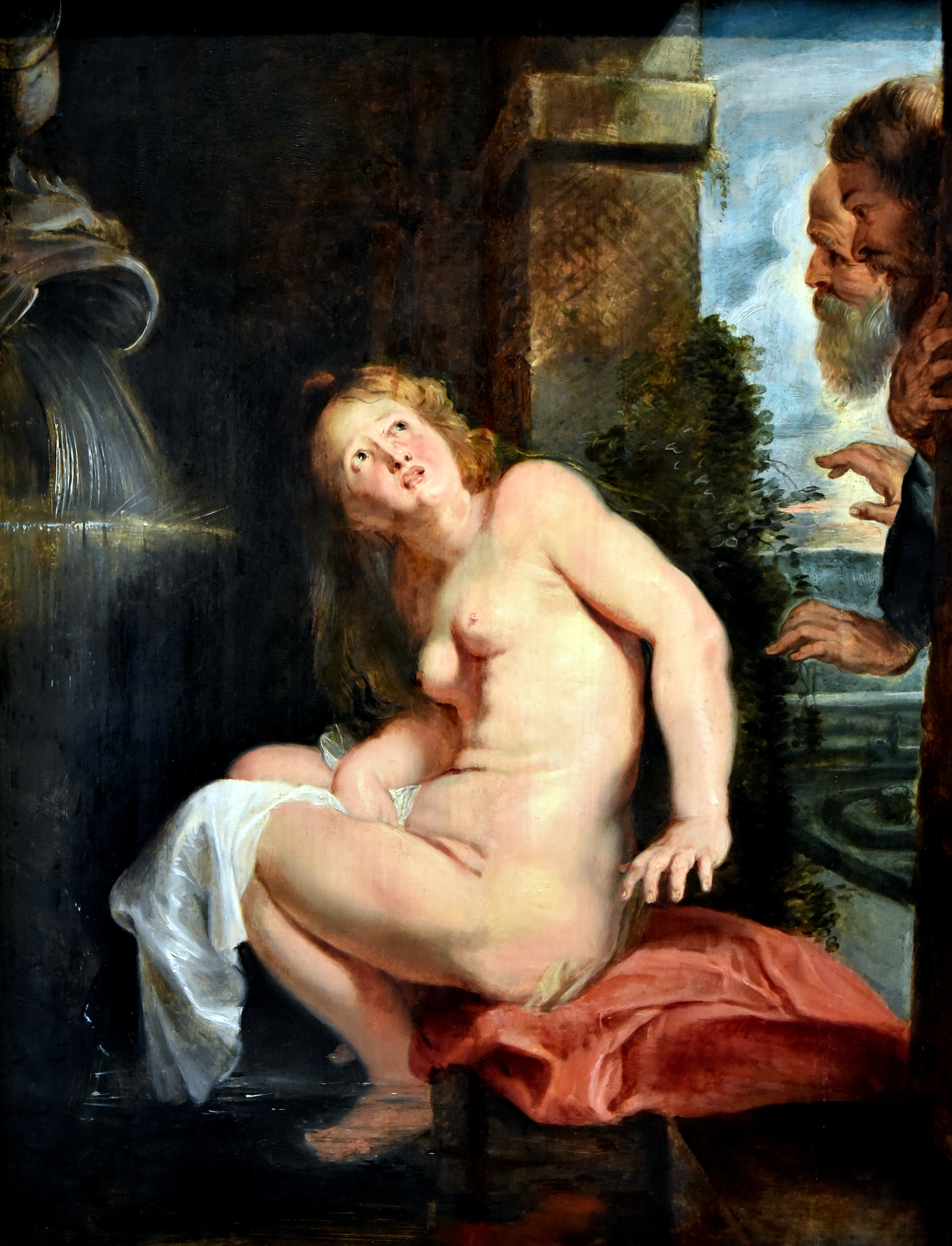
Workshop copy of a lost work of 1614, Nationalmuseum, Stockholm, Sweden

== See also ==
- Susanna and the Elders in art
