= Apollo and Daphne (disambiguation) =

Apollo and Daphne is a transformation myth of Hellenistic origin.

Apollo and Daphne may also refer to:

- Apollo and Daphne (Bernini), a 1622–1625 sculpture by Gian Lorenzo Bernini
- Apollo e Dafne (Handel), a 1709–1710 cantata composed by George Frideric Handel
- Apollo and Daphne (Poussin), a 1661–1664 oil-on-canvas painting by Nicolas Poussin
- Apollo and Daphne (Pollaiuolo), a c. 1470–1480 oil-on-canvas painting by Piero del Pollaiuolo

== See also ==
- Apollo and Daphnis, a c. 1483 painting by Pietro Perugino
