= The Wood of Suicides =

2014 novel by Laura Elizabeth Woollett

- Author: Laura Elizabeth Woollett
- Language: English
- Published: 2014 (The Permanent Press)
- Publication place: United States
- Pages: 192 pp
- ISBN: 978-1-57962-350-0

The Wood of Suicides is a 2014 debut novel by Australian writer Laura Elizabeth Woollett. It centers on a 17-year-old girl's affair with her English teacher, after her father commits suicide.

== Literary references ==
The Wood of Suicides takes its title from Canto XIII of Dante's Inferno, which describes a tortured wood where suicides are encased in bark. It also borrows heavily from the myth of Apollo and Daphne, referencing it explicitly at several points.

== Reception ==
The Wood of Suicides has received mixed to positive reviews. Kirkus Reviews wrote "an anxious, uneasy, and despondent anti-romance novel." Publishers Weekly wrote "The novel successfully creates a disturbing, ethically ambiguous effect, but the prose, though true to the voice of a lovelorn, troubled teenager, feels overwrought."
