= Bust of Alessandro Peretti di Montalto =

Marble portrait bust by Gian Lorenzo Bernini

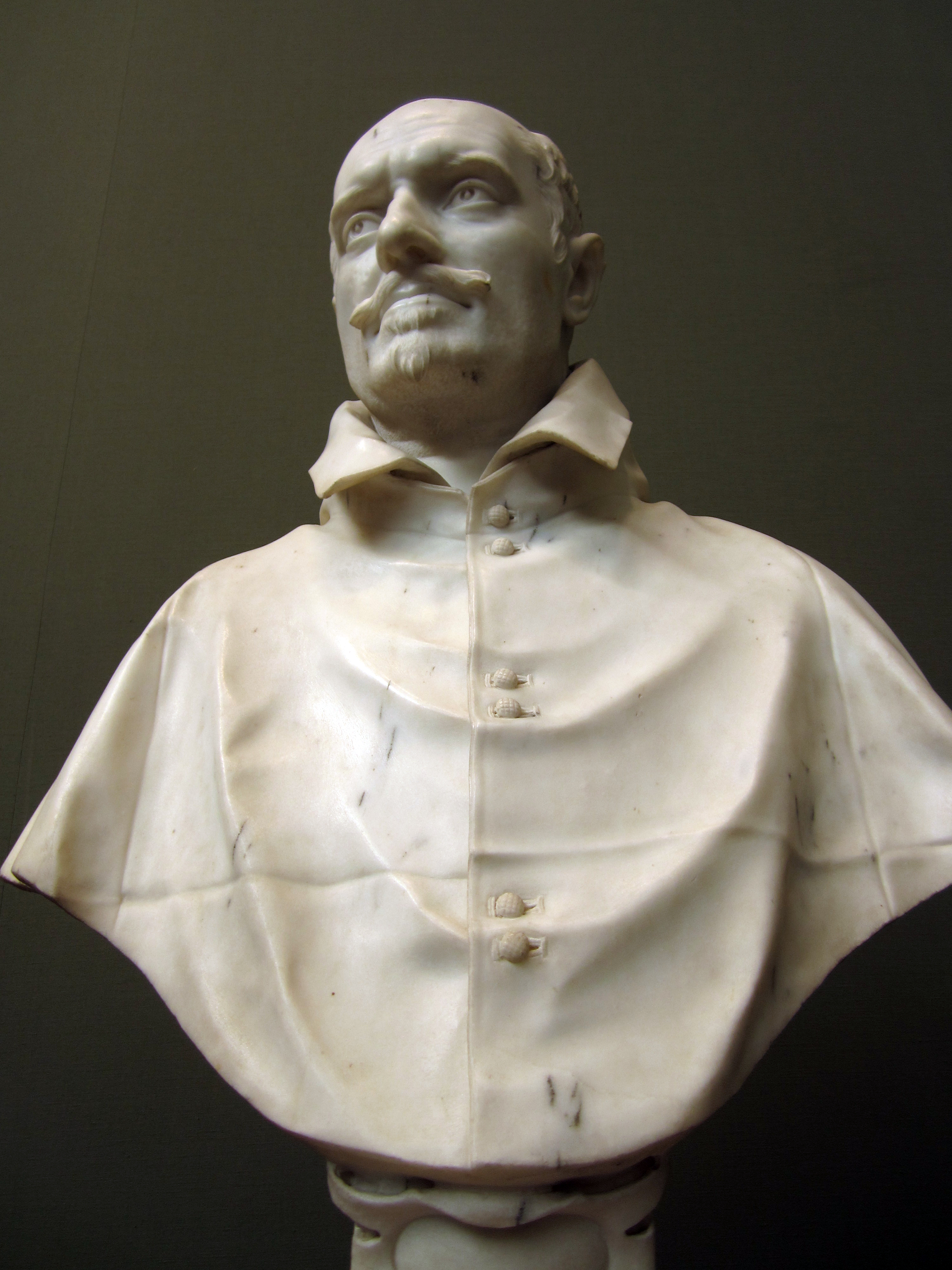
- Artist: Gian Lorenzo Bernini
- Year: 1622
- Catalogue: 81 (7)
- Type: Sculpture
- Medium: Marble
- Dimensions: Life-size
- Location: Kunsthalle; Hamburg; 53°33′18″N 10°0′11.88″E
- Preceded by: Bust of Cardinal Roberto Bellarmine
- Followed by: Bust of Carlo Antonio del Pozzo

The Bust of Alessandro Peretti di Montalto is a portrait sculpture by the Italian artist Gian Lorenzo Bernini. Executed in 1622 and 1623, the sculpture is now in the Kunsthalle Hamburg, in Germany. Although possibly mentioned by one of Bernini's early biographers, the bust had been considered lost and therefore makes no appearance in Rudolf Wittkower's catalogue of Bernini’s sculptures of 1955. However, the bust was identified in the 1980s and is now considered an authentic work by Bernini.

== Commissioning ==
Bernini had already been commissioned by Cardinal Montalto to create the Neptune and Triton fountain for his gardens at the Villa Montalto on the outskirts of Rome, and was involved in the commissioning of the David statue that eventually ended up in the Villa Borghese. But the precise reason behind this bust is unclear; given that Cardinal Montalto died in 1623, it has been suggested the bust was created as part of a funerary tomb. However, Montalto may well himself have commissioned the bust prior to his death.

== History ==
The bust was recorded as being in the Villa Montalto in the early 1660s and then in the "Casa Peretti" in 1682. The bust arrived in Hamburg Kunsthalle after 1910, being donated as part of the collection of the Anglo-German Sir John Henry Schroder.

== Appearance ==
Although only recently re-discovered by art historians the sculpture is well appreciated. Hess comments that "the expression of deep thought and concentration on the cardinal ... gives a great sense of animation to this bust. Bernini has included remarkably naturalistic details, such as the fine hair of his unshaven cheeks, the fleshly lower lip ... and the pockmarks flanking his nose". Meanwhile, Lavin mentions the “extraordinary qualities of vitality and refinement with which Bernini suffused the conventions of formal ecclesiastical portraiture.”

== Gallery ==
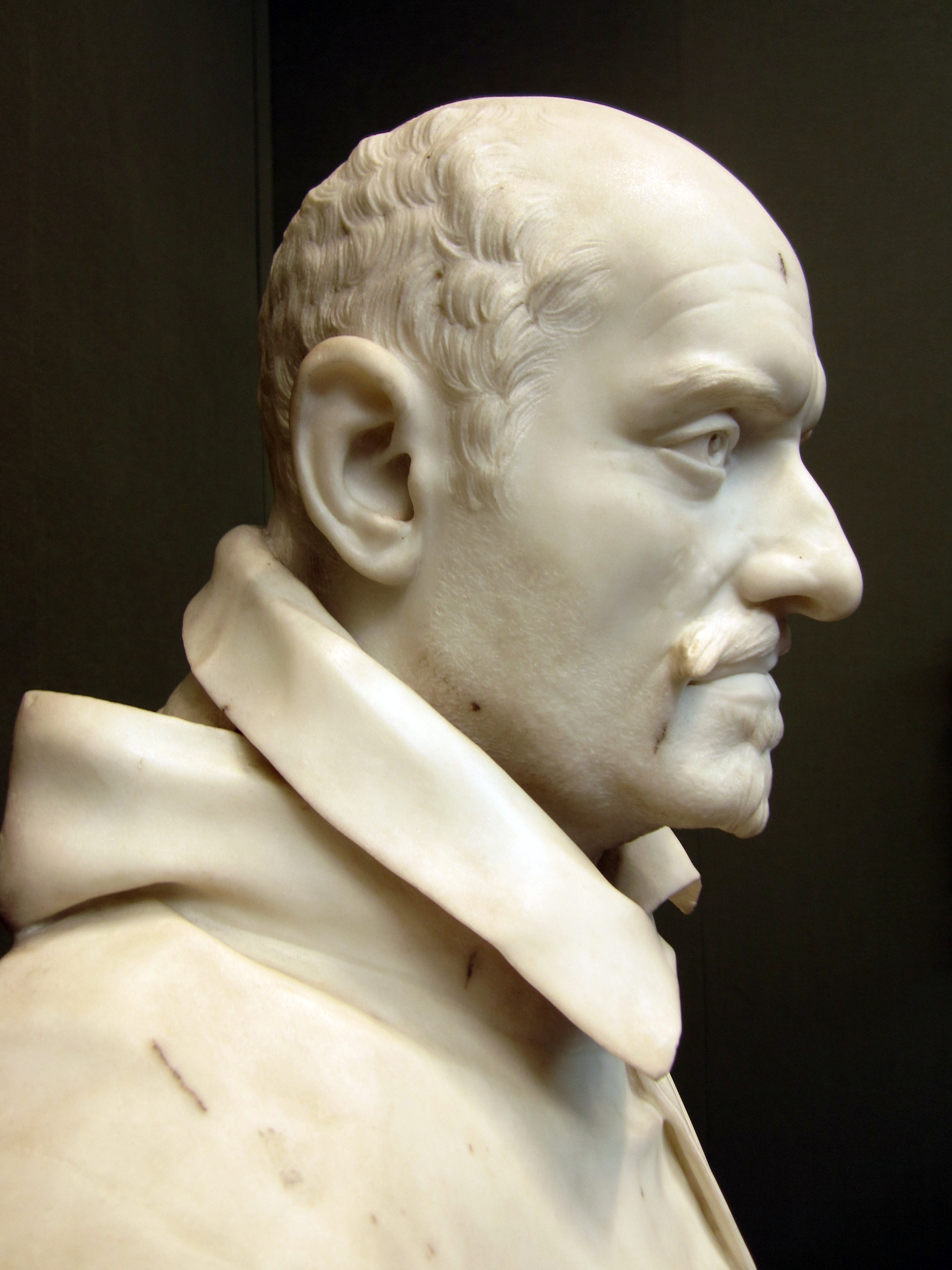

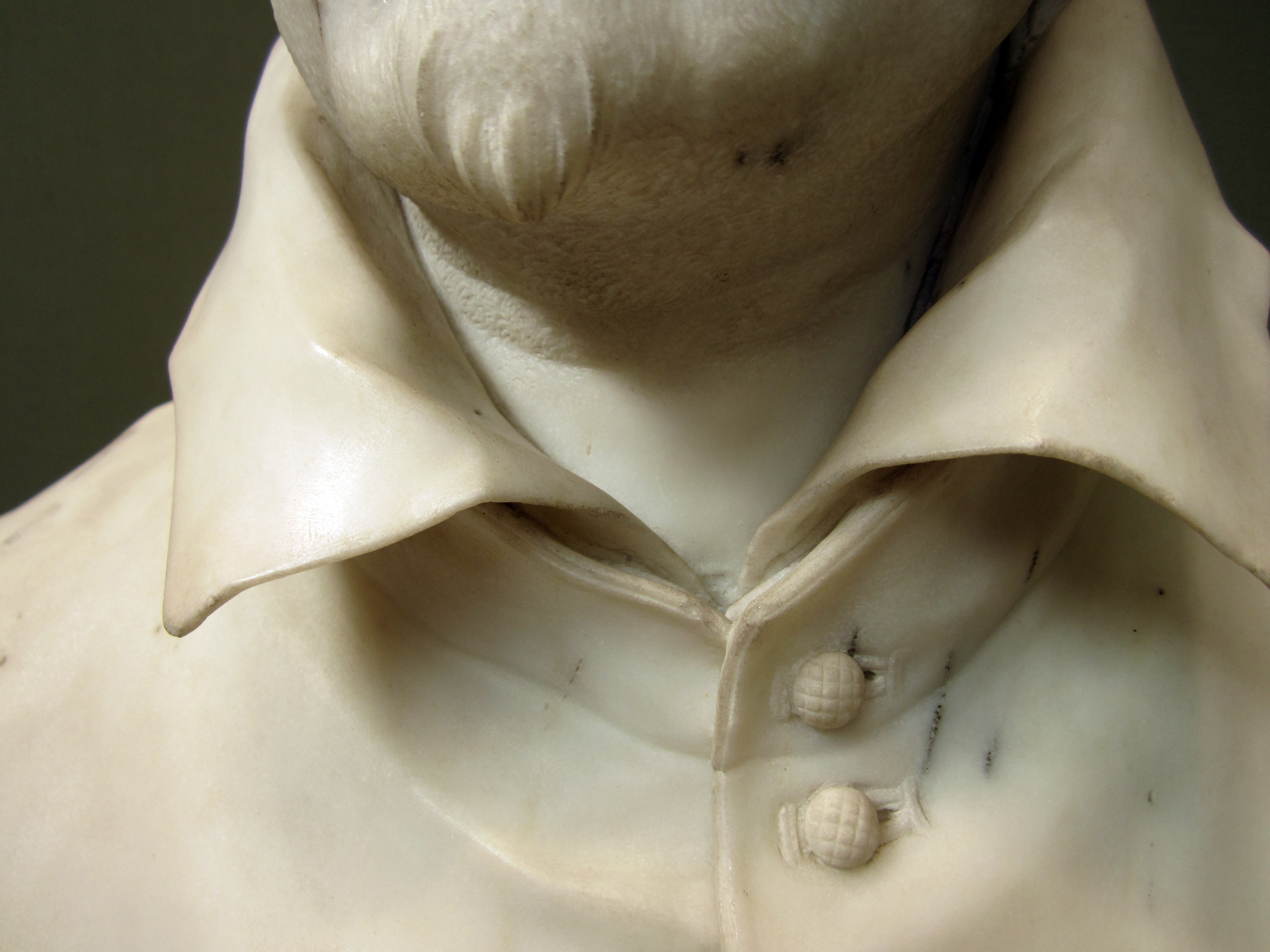

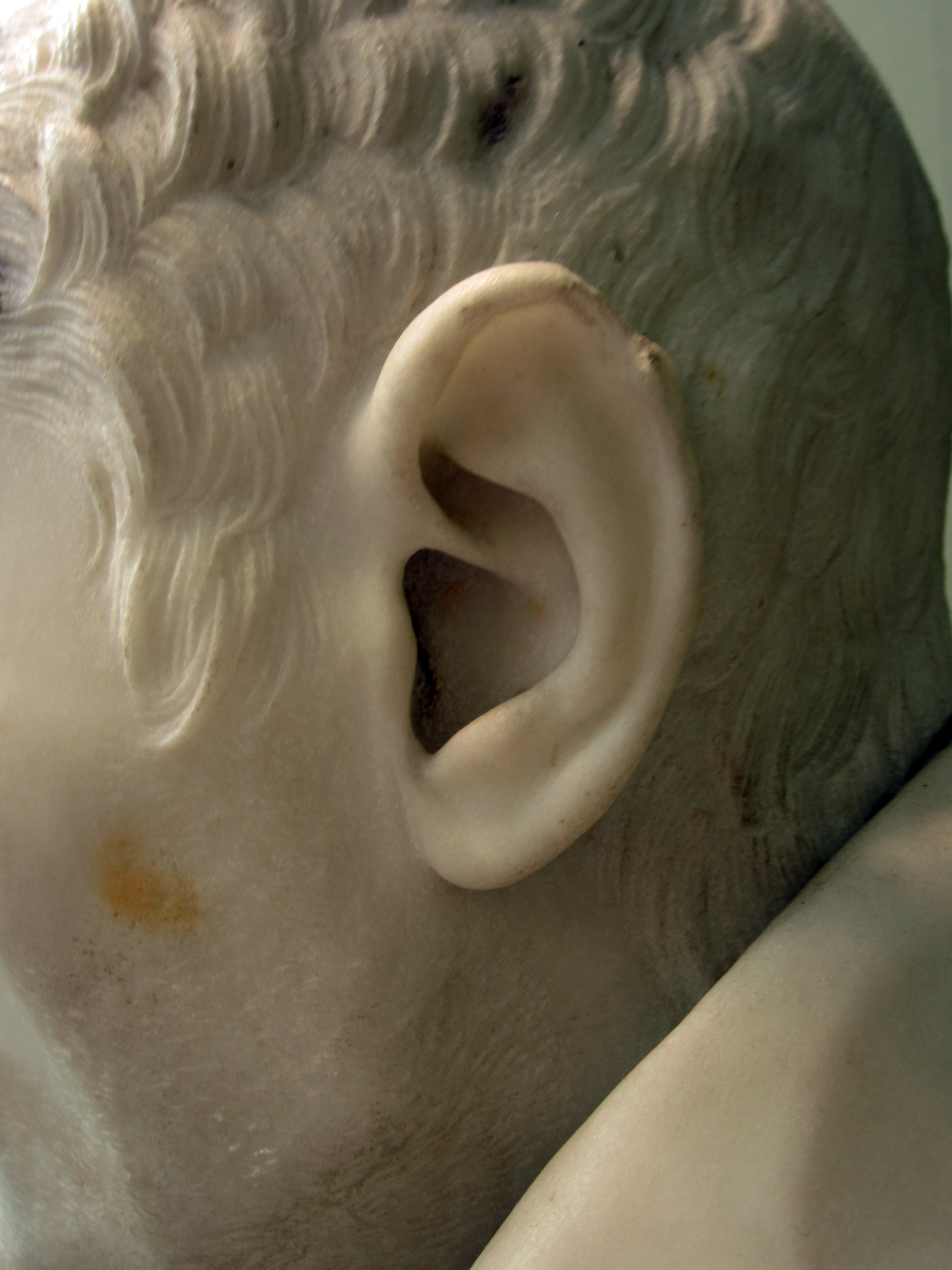

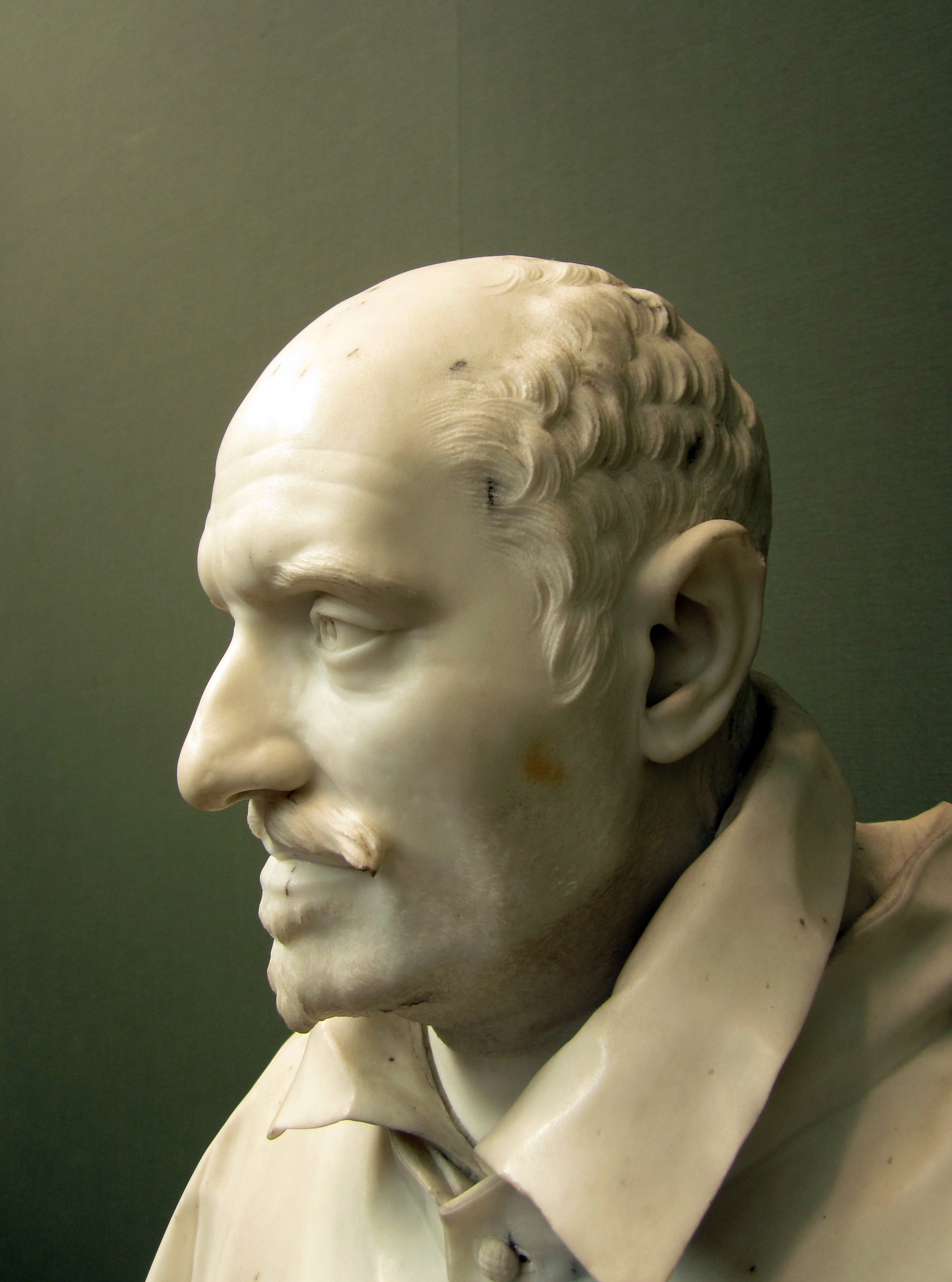

== See also ==
- List of works by Gian Lorenzo Bernini
