= Carlo Antonio Dal Pozzo =

Italian prelate

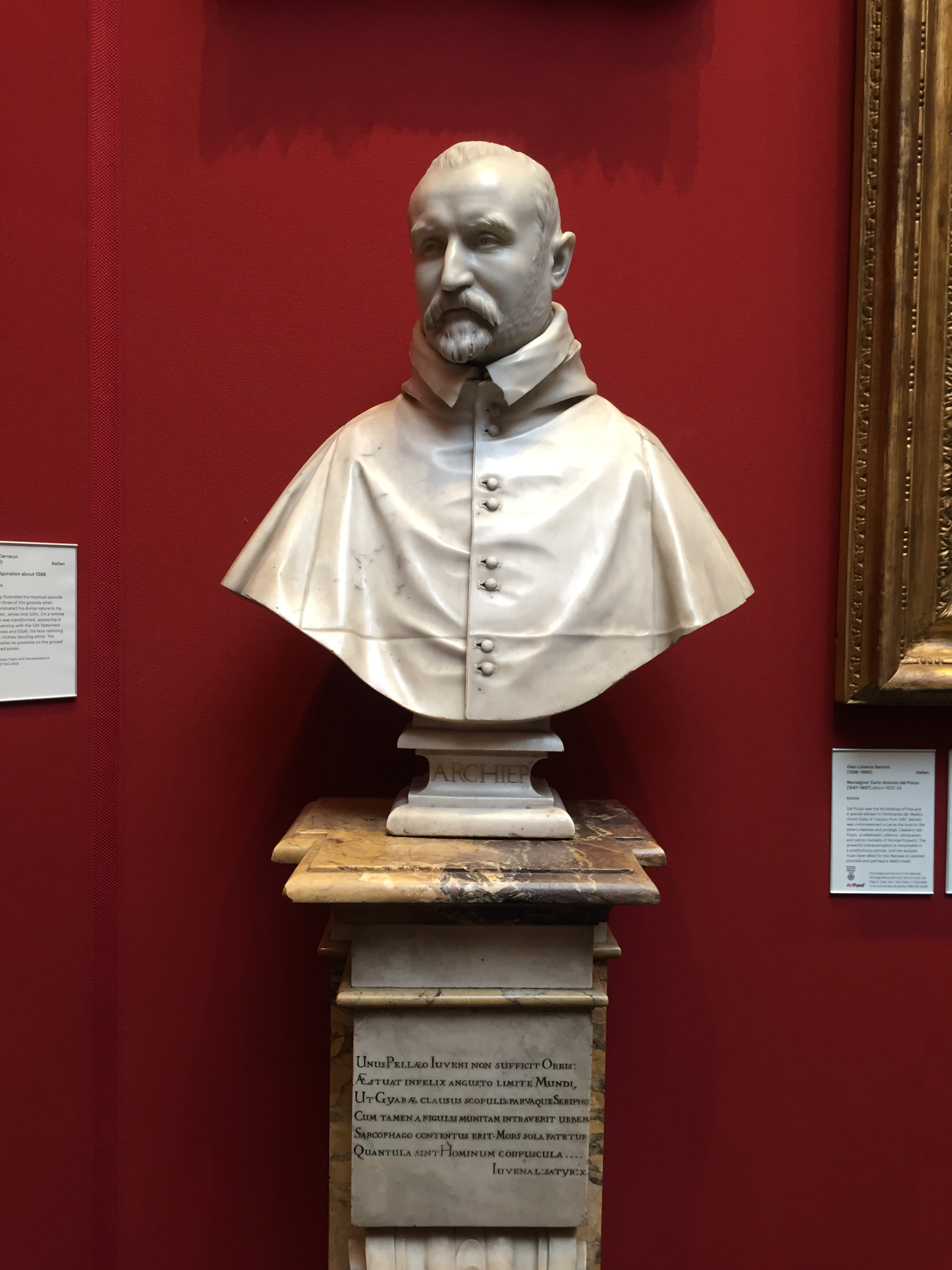
Monsignor Carlo Antonio dal Pozzo (1547-1607) by Gianlorenzo Bernini in the National Gallery of Scotland

Carlo Antonio Dal Pozzo (1547–1607) was an Italian prelate, who was archbishop metropolitan of the Pisa Diocese. He came from the noble family of Dal Pozzo Della Cisterna of Biella. He was the uncle of Cassiano dal Pozzo.

Between his many works, he ordered to build the homonym chapel in the Camposanto Monumentale in Pisa (1594), he made the Collegio Puteano to host some students from Piedmont (1605) and he made cast the homonym bell in the leaning tower (1606).

A portrait bust of Dal Pozzo was made in 1622-4 by the noted Italian artist Gianlorenzo Bernini. It is now in the National Galleries of Scotland, Edinburgh.
