= Bust of Antonio Cepparelli =

Sculpture by Gian Lorenzo Bernini

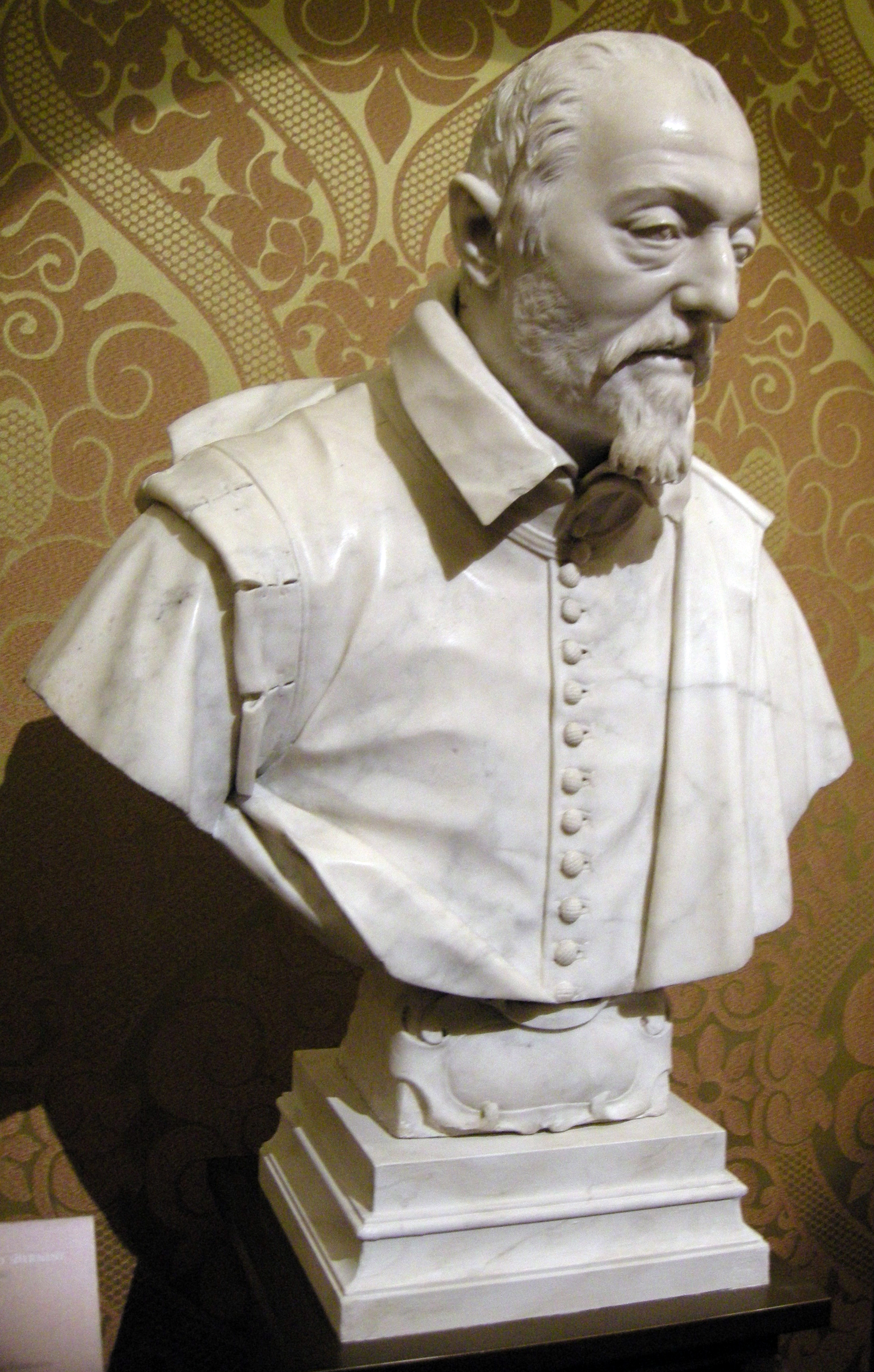
- Artist: Gian Lorenzo Bernini
- Year: 1622
- Type: Sculpture
- Medium: Marble
- Location: San Giovanni dei Fiorentini; Rome; 41.899697°N 12.465022°E
- Preceded by: Apollo and Daphne (Bernini)
- Followed by: St. Peter's Baldachin

The Bust of Antonio Cepparelli is a sculptural portrait bust by the Italian artist Gian Lorenzo Bernini. It was executed around 1622. It is in the museum of the church of San Giovanni dei Fiorentini in Rome.

== See also ==
- List of works by Gian Lorenzo Bernini
