= Bust of Cardinal Roberto Bellarmine =

Sculpture by Gian Lorenzo Bernini

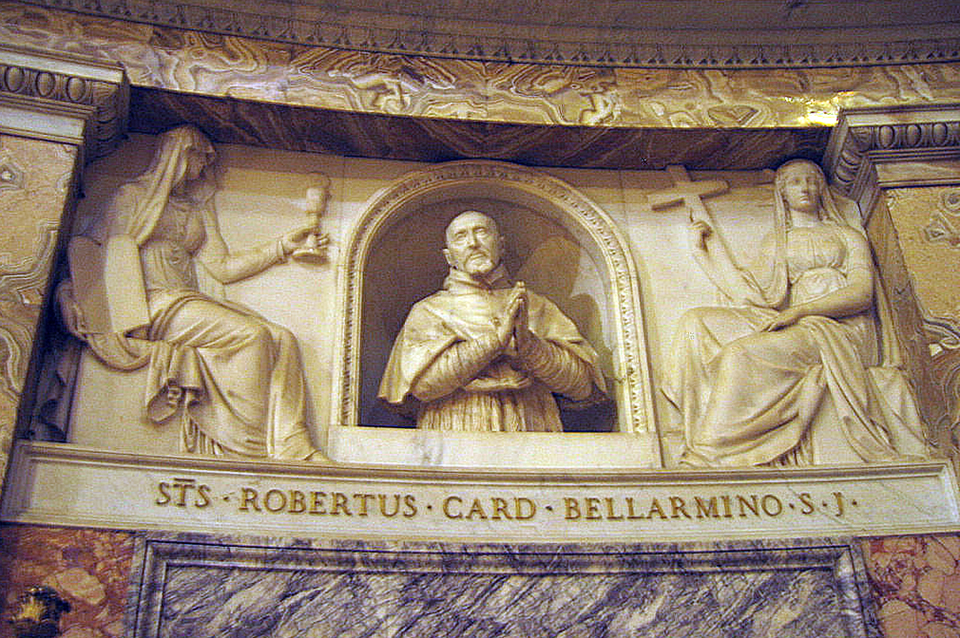
- Artist: Gian Lorenzo Bernini
- Completion date: August 1624
- Medium: Marble
- Subject: Robert Bellarmine
- Location: Chiesa del Gesù, Rome
- Preceded by: Bust of Cardinal Escoubleau de Sourdis
- Followed by: Bust of Alessandro Peretti di Montalto

The Bust of Cardinal Roberto Bellarmine is a half-length portrait of Saint Robert Bellarmine by the Italian artist Gian Lorenzo Bernini. It was executed in the years 1621–1624, and unveiled in August 1624. It sits in the Chiesa del Gesù, Rome. It was commissioned by Pope Gregory XV and Cardinal Odoardo Farnese after Bellarmine's death. A tomb (now destroyed) surrounding the bust was designed by Girolamo Rainaldi, and included sculptural decoration by Bernini's father, Pietro, and Bernini's some-time assistant, Giuliano Finelli.

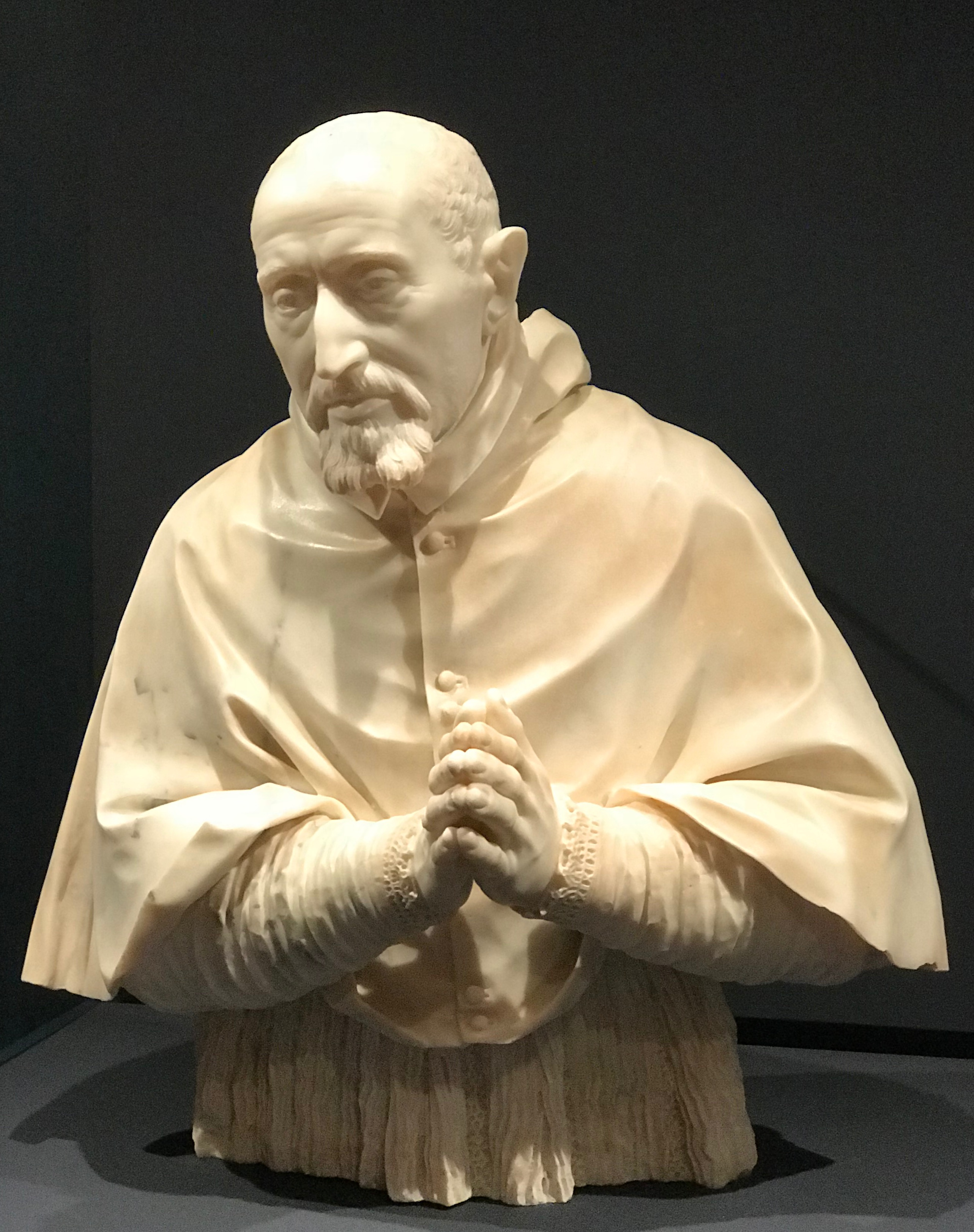
2018, Bellarmine Hall at Fairfield University

The bust was on display at the Fairfield University Art Museum in Fairfield, Connecticut from February 2 to May 19, 2018 in a special exhibition.

== See also ==
- List of works by Gian Lorenzo Bernini
