= Bust of Carlo Antonio del Pozzo =

Sculpture by Gianlorenzo Bernini

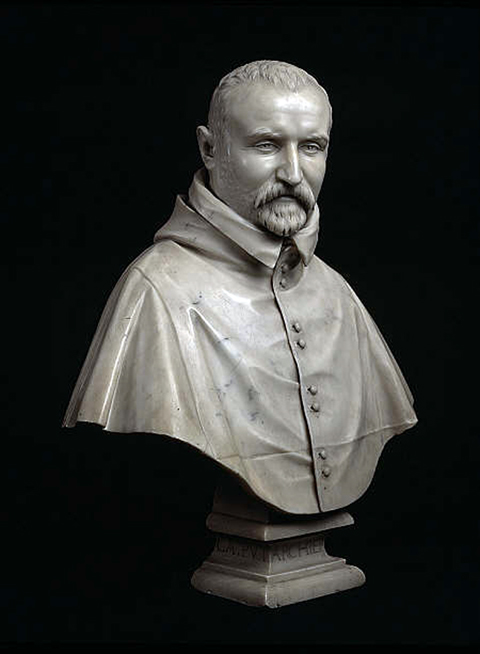
- Artist: Gian Lorenzo Bernini
- Year: 1622
- Type: Sculpture
- Medium: Marble
- Subject: Carlo Antonio del Pozzo
- Dimensions: 82 cm × 70 cm (32 in × 28 in)
- Location: National Galleries of Scotland; Edinburgh; 55°57′0.28″N 3°11′44.13″W
- Preceded by: Bust of Alessandro Peretti di Montalto
- Followed by: David (Bernini)

The Bust of Carlo Antonio del Pozzo is a sculptural portrait by the Italian artist Gianlorenzo Bernini. It is in the National Gallery of Scotland, Edinburgh. Carlo Antonio was the Archbishop of Pisa and the uncle of the noted seventeenth-century collector, Cassiano del Pozzo, who commissioned Bernini to create the sculpture.

It was acquired by the National Gallery of Scotland in 1986, at a cost of 3m British Pounds, although the value at the time was said to be much higher (around 7.5m pounds). It had previously been in the British stately home of Castle Howard, since 1715.

== See also ==
- List of works by Gian Lorenzo Bernini
