= Fairfield University Art Museum =

Museum in Fairfield, Connecticut, US

Coordinates: 41.1584°N 73.2533°W

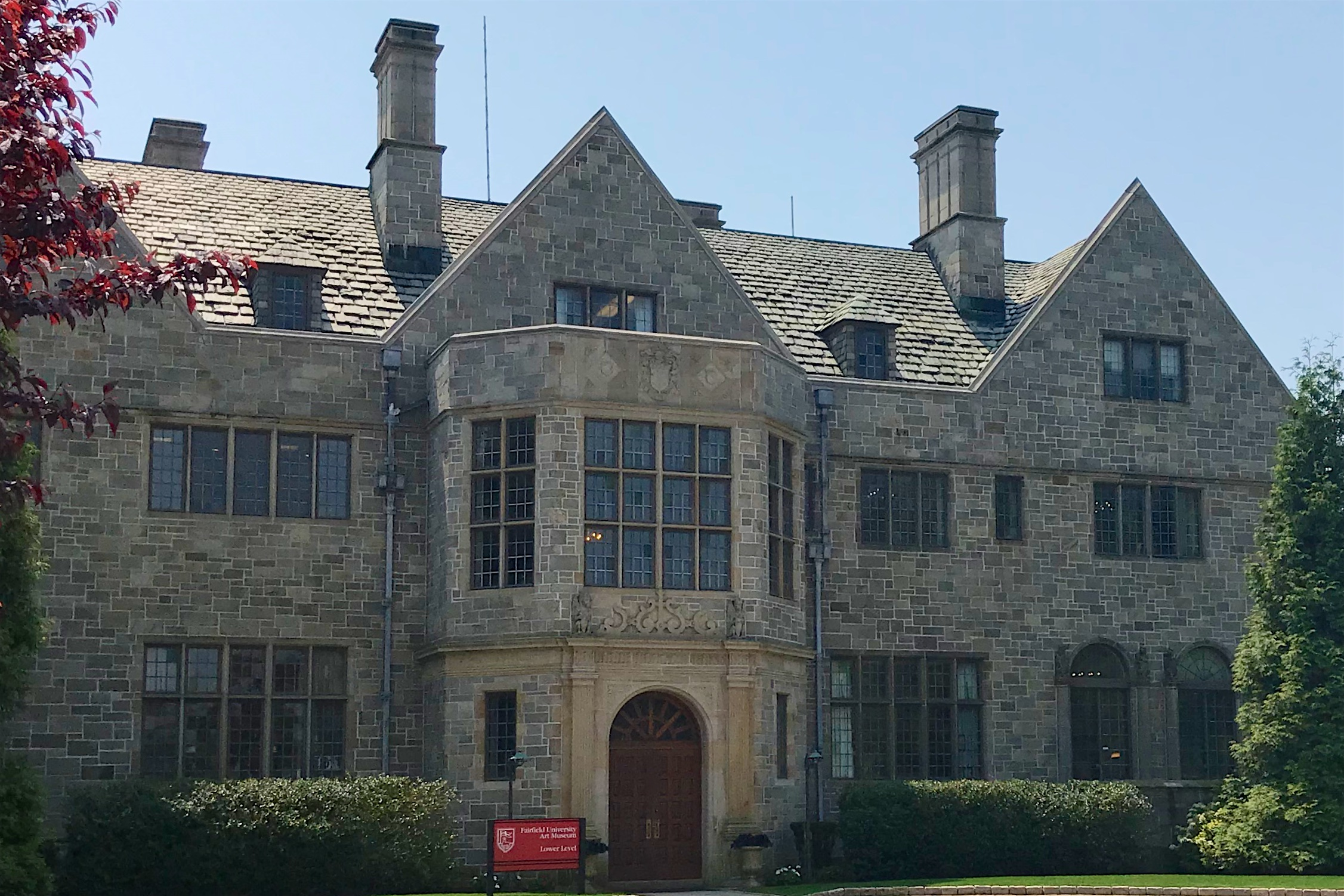
- The museum's exterior and entrance
- Established: 2010; 16 years ago
- Location: Fairfield, Connecticut, U.S.
- Director: Carey Mack Weber
- Website: www.fairfield.edu/museum

The Fairfield University Art Museum, formerly the Bellarmine Museum of Art, is an art museum located on the renovated lower level of Bellarmine Hall on the campus of Fairfield University in Fairfield, Connecticut. The museum features Classical, Medieval, Renaissance, Baroque, Celtic, and Asian art and artifacts in three distinct galleries totaling 2,700 square feet (250 m^{2}) of space.

The museum hosts two to three special exhibitions each year in the Bellarmine Hall Galleries. The museum also includes the Walsh Gallery, in the Regina A. Quick Center for the Performing Arts, with 1800 square feet of exhibition space. The Walsh Gallery hosts two to three special exhibitions annually. It is ranked as one of the "Most Amazing College Museum in the United States," with an "incredibly rich and broad collection of paintings, sculpture, and plaster casts, the Bellarmine Museum of Art is a must-see for art enthusiasts."

In 2024, the museum received full American Alliance of Museums (AAM) accreditation for its commitment to excellence, accountability, and high professional standards.

== History ==
The Fairfield University Art Museum opened as the Bellarmine Museum of Art in October 2010. It was built at a cost of $3.2 million and was designed by Centerbrook Architects & Planners. The museum's main gallery, The Frank and Clara Meditz Gallery, is named in honor of the parents of the lead donor to the project, University Trustee and alumnus John Meditz '70.

The museum is located on the renovated lower level of Bellarmine Hall which was designed in 1921 in the English manorial style. Formerly known as Hearthstone Hall because of its many fireplaces and chimneys, this forty-four room mansion was built by Walter B. Lashar, owner of the American Chain and Cable Company. The Jesuits purchased Bellarmine Hall and the surrounding estate from the town of Fairfield in 1942 to serve as one of the foundational building for Fairfield University.

Jill Deupi was the founding director and chief curator involved in building the museum, and serving from 2010-2014, Carey Mack Weber served as interim director for one year, and was followed by Linda Wolk-Simon. In 2019 Carey Mack Weber was appointed executive director.

== Collections ==
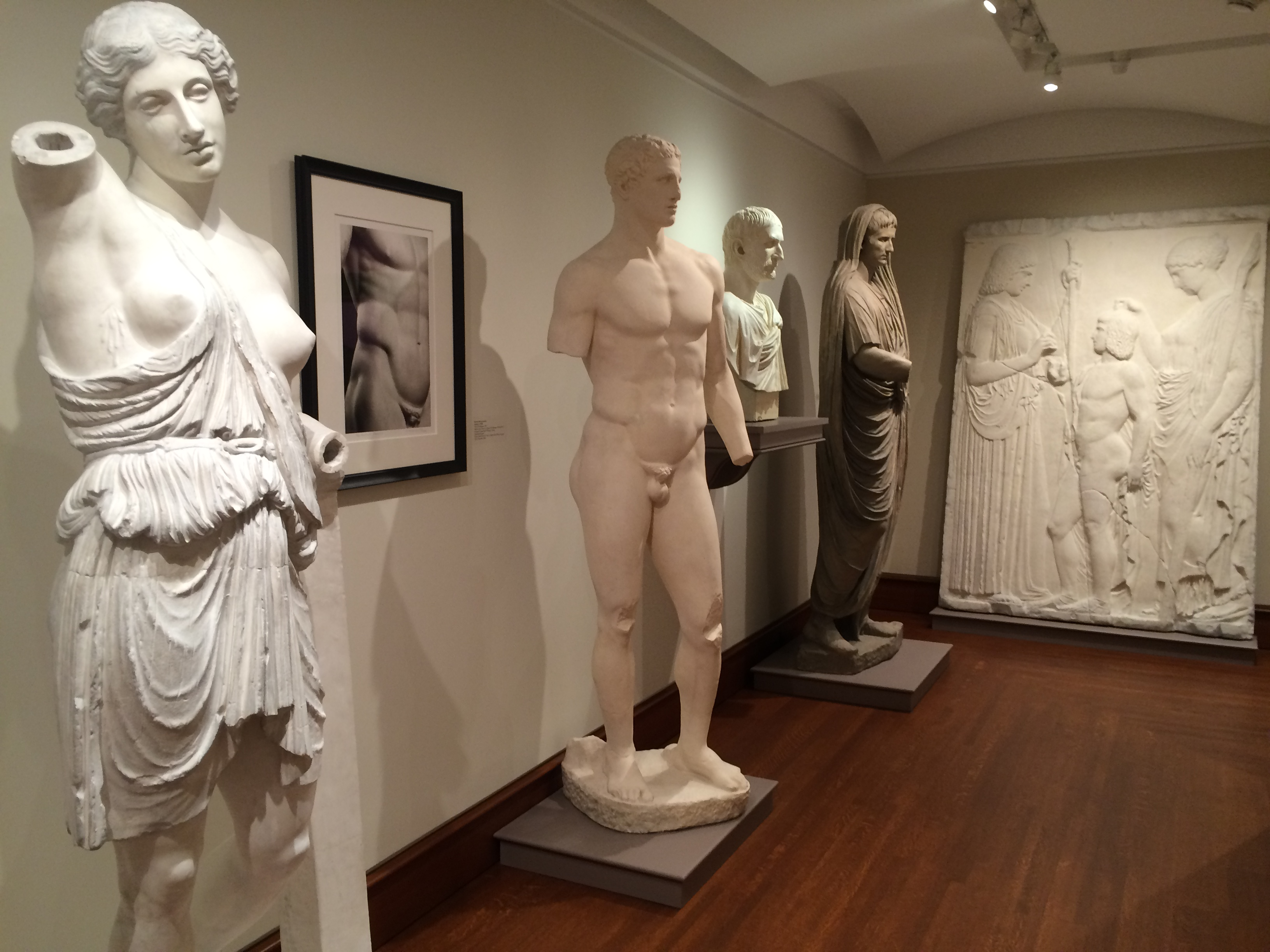
The museum features historic plaster casts after important works from ancient Greece and Rome

The Meditz Gallery, which resembles an early Christian basilica in plan, showcases ten paintings from the Italian Renaissance and Baroque periods, works gifted to the University by the Samuel H. Kress Foundation through Bridgeport's Discovery Museum. The entrance hall to the museum contains highlights from the University's collection of plaster casts after exemplary works from Ancient Rome and Greece, including eight recently donated to the University by the Acropolis Museum in Athens.

Additional galleries in the museum house a range of non-Western art artifacts (including pre-Columbian vessels, 19th-century South East Asian sculptures and African masks), along with pieces from the Celtic, Byzantine, Medieval and Romanesque periods on loan from the Metropolitan Museum of Art's Department of Medieval Art and The Cloisters. Special exhibitions which have been presented in recent years have included work by the art deco master Hildreth Meiere, French drawings and paintings from the Horvitz Collection, ledger drawings of the Plains Indians, images of Manhattan by Adolf Dehn, a ground-breaking exhibition on hair in the classical world and a major international loan exhibition entitled "The Holy Name - Art of the Gesu: Bernini and his Age." This exhibition included six works from the Museum of the Church of the Gesu which had never before left Rome, including a Bernini bust of Cardinal Roberto Bellarmino, the patron saint of Fairfield University.

The Walsh Gallery is used by the museum primarily for exhibitions of modern and contemporary art. Recent exhibitions have included Rodin sculpture, William Kentridge prints, a Richard Lytle retrospective, paintings by Leonardo Cremonini from the collection of the William Louis-Dreyfus Foundation, Don Gummer drawings and sculpture, and work by the Guerrilla Girls.

In 2017, the Fairfield University Art Museum received a transformative gift of over 1200 prints from the artist, collector, and master printer James Reed. The James Reed Print Collection includes works by some of the preeminent artists of the French 19th century, including Théodore Géricault, Eugène Delacroix, Honoré Daumier, Édouard Manet, Odilon Redon, Maurice Denis and Henri Fantin-Latour. In addition, the collection includes Old Master engravings, etchings and woodcuts by northern European artists such as Maerten de Vos and Jost Amman, as well as a group of German Expressionist woodcuts and lithographs by artists such as Ernst Ludwig Kirchner and Max Beckmann. Newer additions to the collection are primarily American contemporary prints by artists such as Josef Albers, Jim Dine, Richard Haas, Jasper Johns, Claes Oldenberg, as well as works by Connecticut artists that were printed by Reed at his Milestone Graphics studio.

== Gallery ==
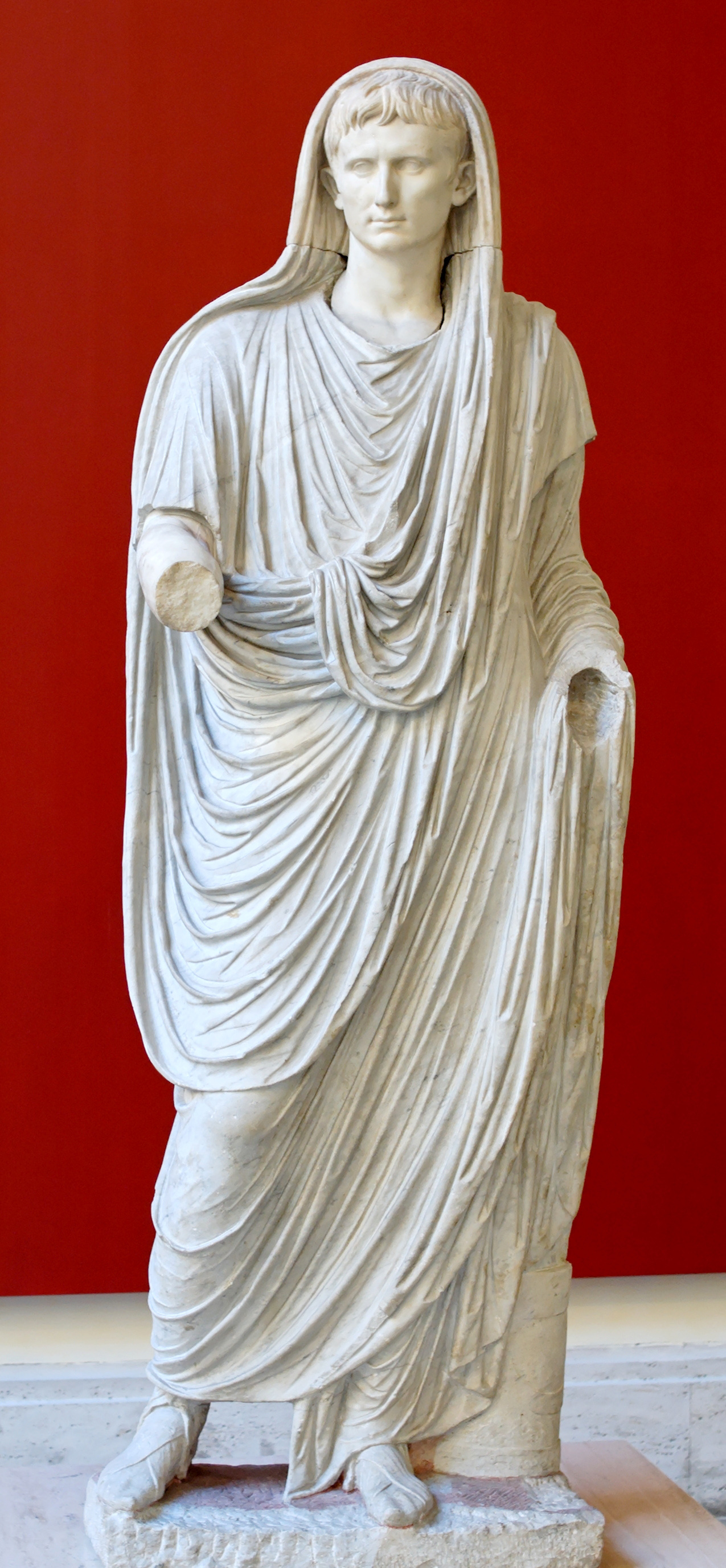
Augustus as Pontifex Maximus, c. 1st century

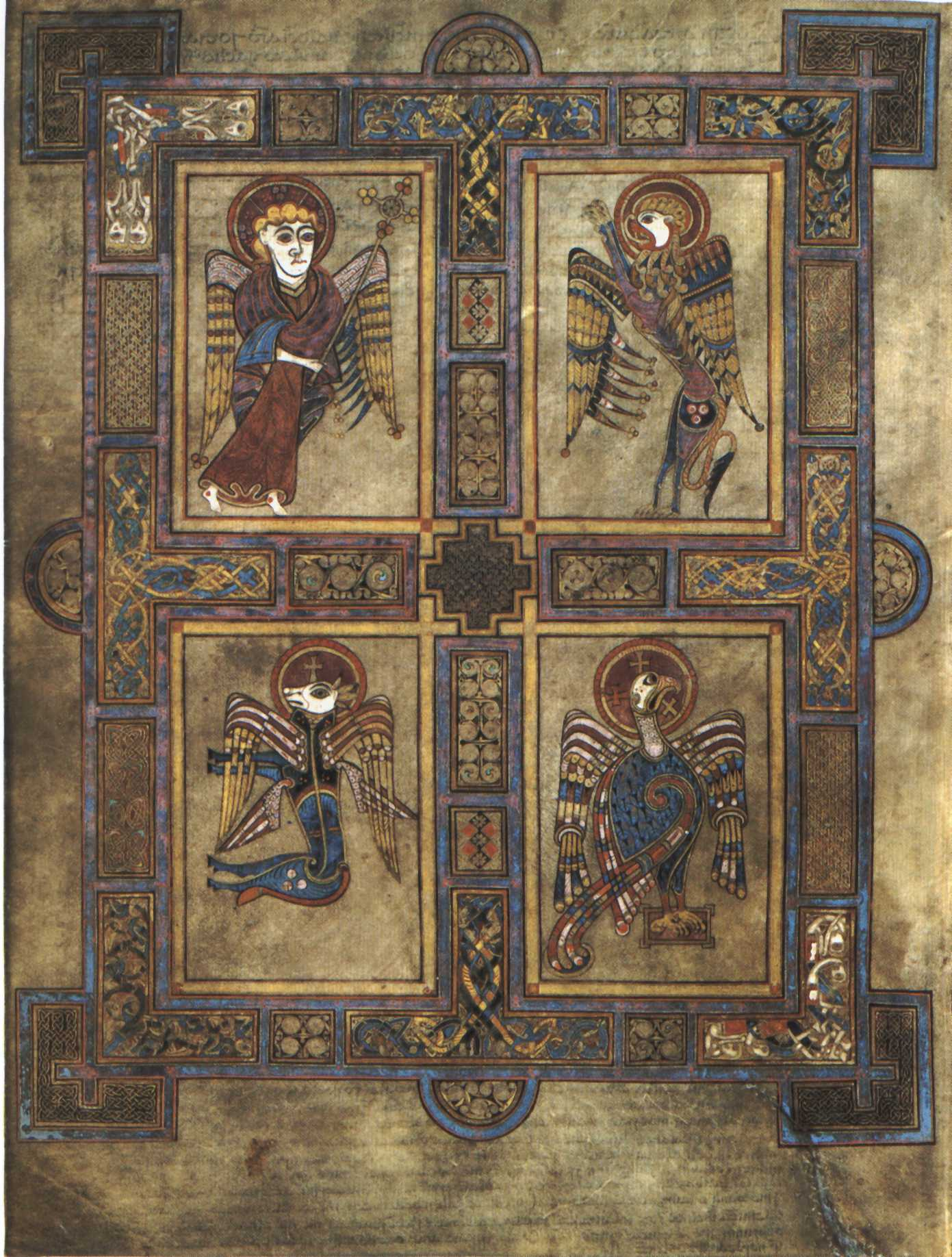
The Books of Kells,
c. 800

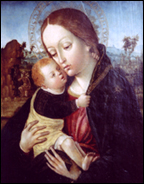
Madonna and Child,
c. 1525

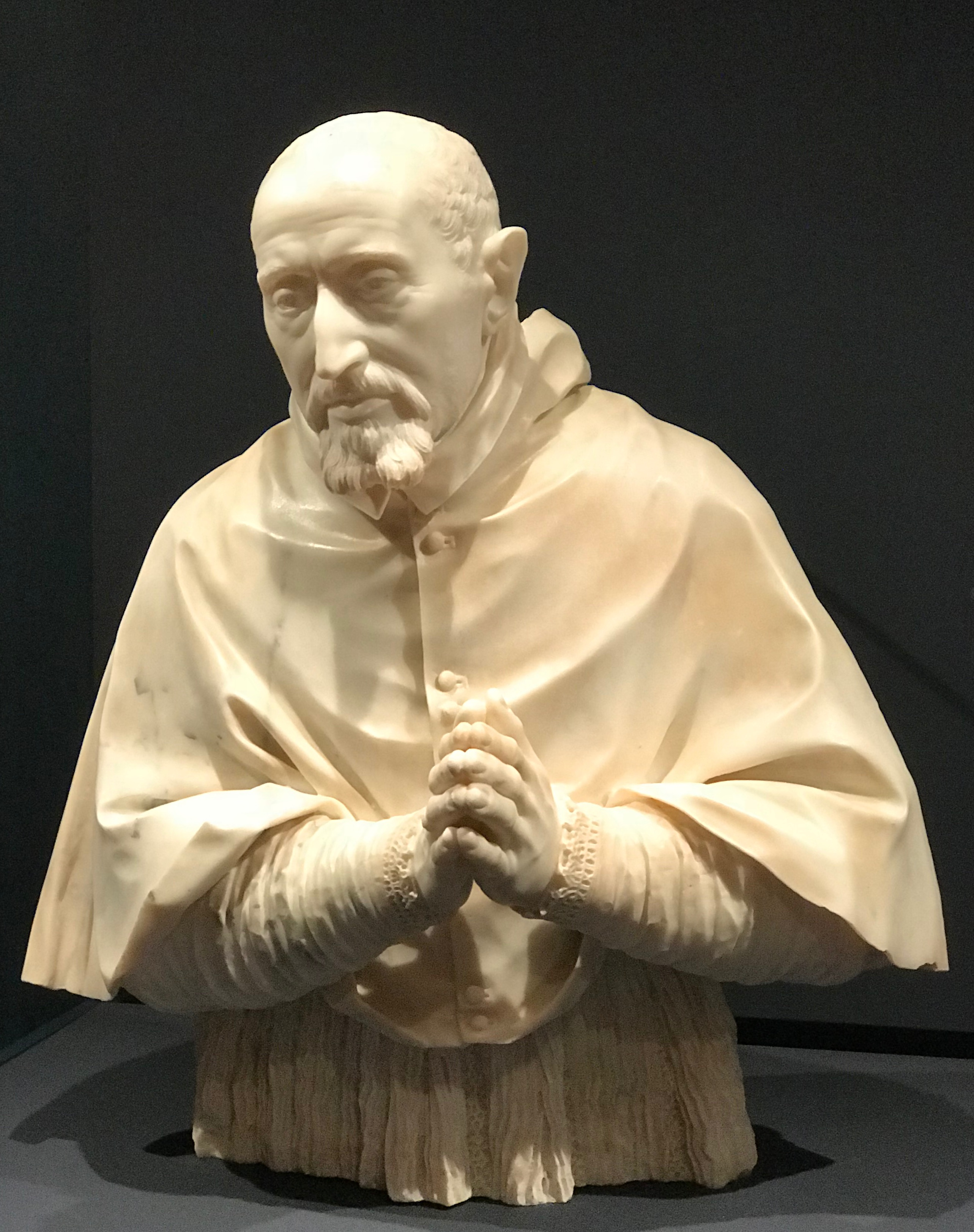
Bust of Cardinal Roberto Bellarmine by Bernini, 1621–1624, displayed in 2018
