= Jill Deupi =

American museum director, curator, and scholar

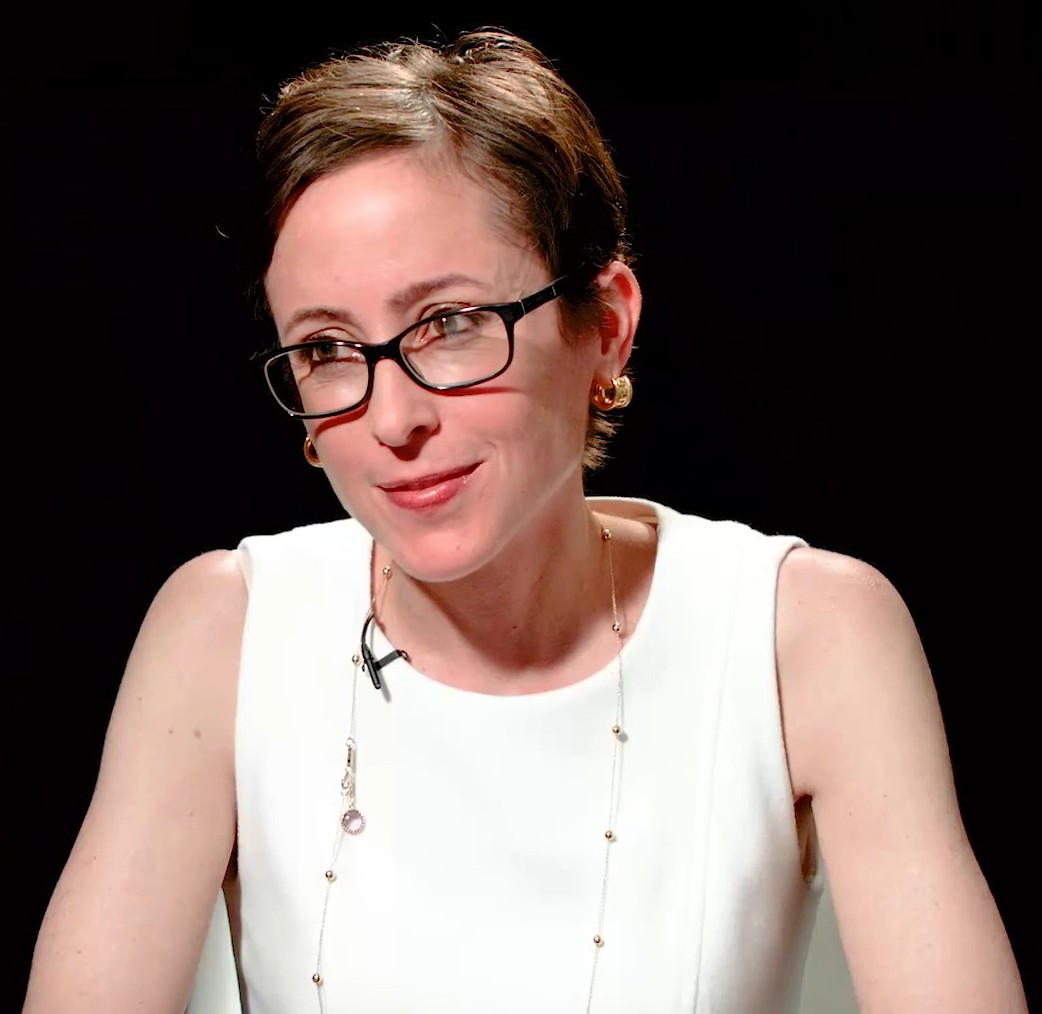
- Deupi in 2017
- Born: Adak, Alaska
- Awards: "Rome Prize" (two-year fellowship at the American Academy in Rome)

Academic background
- Education: BA (French and Political Science), Mount Holyoke College; JD, American University, Washington College of Law; MA (History of Art), University of London, Birkbeck College; PhD (History of Art), University of Virginia)
- Alma mater: Mount Holyoke College
- Thesis: Cultural politics in Bourbon Naples, 1734-1799 : antiquities, academies and rivalries with Rome (2006)
- Academic advisor: Dr. Christopher M. S. Johns

Jill Deupi is the Beaux Arts Executive Director and Chief Curator of the Lowe Art Museum at the University of Miami.

== Early life and education ==
Born in Adak, Alaska, Deupi grew up in Edinboro, Pennsylvania and, from the age of eight, Kilmarknock, Virginia. She graduated from St. Margaret's School, a boarding high school in Tappahannock, Virginia. Deupi holds a B.A. in French and Political Science (Mount Holyoke College); a J.D. (Washington College of Law, American University, summa cum laude); an M.A. in the History of Art (Birkbeck College, University of London); a Ph.D. in Art History (University of Virginia); a graduate certificate in Arts Administration (New York University); and an executive education certificate in Art and Cultural Heritage Law (Georgetown University Law Center). She was admitted to the American Bar Association in the Commonwealth of Virginia in 1996.

== Career ==
Her prior professional experience includes work at the Royal Academy of Arts, the Art Institute of Chicago, the Snite (now the Raclin Murphy) Museum of Art, the National Gallery of Art, and the Wallace Collection.

Deupi was the founding director of the Fairfield University Art Museum which opened in 2010. She concurrently was on the faculty of Fairfield University. In 2014 she moved to the University of Miami's Lowe Art Museum. One focus of Deupi's work in Miami has been to make the museum more accessible to the general public.

== Honors and awards ==
In 2002 she was awarded a two-year pre-doctoral "Rome Prize" by the American Academy in Rome.
