= Cassiano dal Pozzo =

Italian scholar and patron of arts (1588–1657)

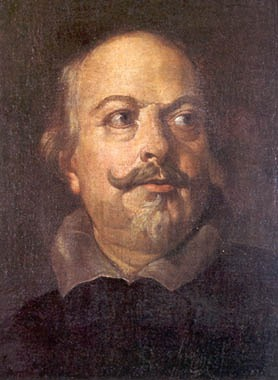
- Jan van den Hoecke, Portrait of Cassiano dal Pozzo
- Born: 21 February 1588; Turin, Duchy of Savoy
- Died: 22 October 1657 (aged 69); Rome, Papal States
- Resting place: Santa Maria sopra Minerva
- Alma mater: University of Pisa
- Occupation: Scientist, classical scholar

Cassiano dal Pozzo (1588 – 22 October 1657) was an Italian scholar and patron of arts. The secretary of Cardinal Francesco Barberini, he was an antiquary in the classicizing circle of Rome, and a long-term friend and patron of Nicolas Poussin, whom he supported from his earliest arrival in Rome: Poussin in a letter declared that he was "a disciple of the house and the museum of cavaliere dal Pozzo." A doctor with interests in the proto-science of alchemy, a correspondent of major figures like Galileo, a collector of books and master drawings, dal Pozzo was a node in the network of European scientific figures.

== Biography ==
Dal Pozzo was born in Turin, to a noble family originating from Vercelli, the grandson of the first minister of the Grand Duke of Tuscany.

He was raised in Florence and educated at the University of Pisa. In 1612 he moved to Rome, where with deft diplomacy he moved among influential and cultivated patrons. After taking up a position as secretary in Cardinal Barberini's household in 1623, Cassiano soon became a prominent figure in Rome's intellectual life; both he and the Cardinal were members of the Accademia dei Lincei, the scientific society founded by principe Federico Cesi. Cassiano was soon joined in Rome by his younger brother Carlo Antonio (1606–1689), who shared his artistic and scientific interests and played a significant role in augmenting the collection that Cassiano commenced about 1615 and came to call his Museo Cartaceo ("Paper Museum"). The brothers also maintained collections of live birds and animals in their palazzo on via dei Chiavari in Rome. Aside from drawings of artists of the Quattrocento and the High Renaissance, he commissioned from his “giovani ben intendenti del disegno” hundreds of drawings after the Antique and examples of curiosities of every kind. Cassiano had casts made of works of sculpture, such as the reliefs of Trajan's Column, which Poussin seems to have drawn at leisure, rather than working from the original (Friedlaender 1964).

Aside from his lasting friendship with Poussin, who shared his antiquarian interests and from whom Cassiano commissioned the series of seven Sacraments and the illustrated manuscript of Leonardo's Le Regole e Precetti della Pittura, Cassiano's patronage extended to the French painter in Rome Simon Vouet and the classicizing sculptor Alessandro Algardi, to Artemisia Gentileschi, Gian Lorenzo Bernini (from whom he commissioned a bust of his uncle, Carlo Antonio), Pietro da Cortona, Caravaggio as well as lesser-known contemporary artists whom he kept busy with lesser commissions for his Museo Cartaceo. His close connections with leading European scientists such as Galileo, with scholars and philosophers, kept him fully informed of the latest archaeological and scientific discoveries, for all of which he attempted to provide a visual record in his Museo. Cassiano also appears to have patronized the publication of manuscripts on painting by Matteo Zaccolini.

Cassiano accumulated illustrations of Roman sculpture and antiquities, including drawings by and after Pirro Ligorio, and—unusually—of early medieval works. In addition, he collected a whole range of natural history, geological samples and fossils, botanical illustrations and drawings of microscope observations, in effect, wunderkammer of objects. As antiquarian, Cassiano applied a new systematic methodology: classical monuments were painstakingly measured, drawn and annotated, in a manner that would not become usual until the mid-eighteenth century. This massive accumulation he classified thematically, according to the testimony they represented of antique cult, customs, dress, and architecture. The Museo was never published—a herculean venture currently under way— but dal Pozzo generously made it available to scholars in Rome. Some of the bird drawings commissioned by Cassiano were made use of by Giovanni Pietro Olina in his book Uccelliera (1684).

After the death of Federico Cesi, it was left to Cassiano dal Pozzo and Francesco Stelluti to conserve the precious inheritance of scientific instruments, books and research. Rather than see Cesi's library dispersed, Cassiano purchased it, with part of Cesi's natural history cabinet, in December 1633 and housed it with his own collection at Sant'Andrea della Valle. His financial and intellectual support helped the Lincei achieve its most lasting monument, Il Tesoro Messicano, which was brought to the printer between 1628 and 1651.

After the visit to Rome in 1636 of the English physician George Ent (later a fellow of the Royal Society), a correspondence ensued. Cassiano sent Ent specimens of petrified wood and a tabletop made from fossil wood, which had come from the estates of Federico Cesi at Acquasparta; the specimens and the tabletop were shown to early meetings of the Royal Society and had a significant part in the developing debate on the origin of fossils. The correspondence also records exchanges of books between London and Rome; among medical matters there is news of William Harvey and his works.

His contemporary biographer was Carlo Dati, whose laudatory oration Delle lodi del Commendator Cassiano dal Pozzo was printed in Florence, 1664. His portrait by Jan Van de Hoeck was included in the exhibition Cassiano dal Pozzo. I segreti di un Collezionista, 2000.

== Legacy ==
Cassiano's heirs sold the Museo to the Albani Pope Clement XI, who resold it to his connoisseur nephew Cardinal Alessandro Albani. In 1762 the major part was purchased for George III, a scientific amateur himself, who kept the collection at Buckingham Palace. It remains part of the Royal Collection, but is now divided, according to its subject matter, between Windsor Castle, the British Museum, the British Library, the Royal Botanical Gardens at Kew (mycological specimens), and the library of Sir John Soane's Museum. Material not purchased for King George is at the Institut de France in Paris (botanical drawings) and elsewhere.

A comprehensive catalogue raisonné of the collection in thirty-four volumes is in progress of publication under the title The Paper Museum of Cassiano dal Pozzo. It is being produced under the auspices of the Royal Collection Trust and the Warburg Institute, and with the support of the British Academy, the Accademia dei Lincei and the Académie des Inscriptions et Belles-Lettres.
