= Apollo and Daphne (Bernini) =

Marble sculpture by Gian Lorenzo Bernini

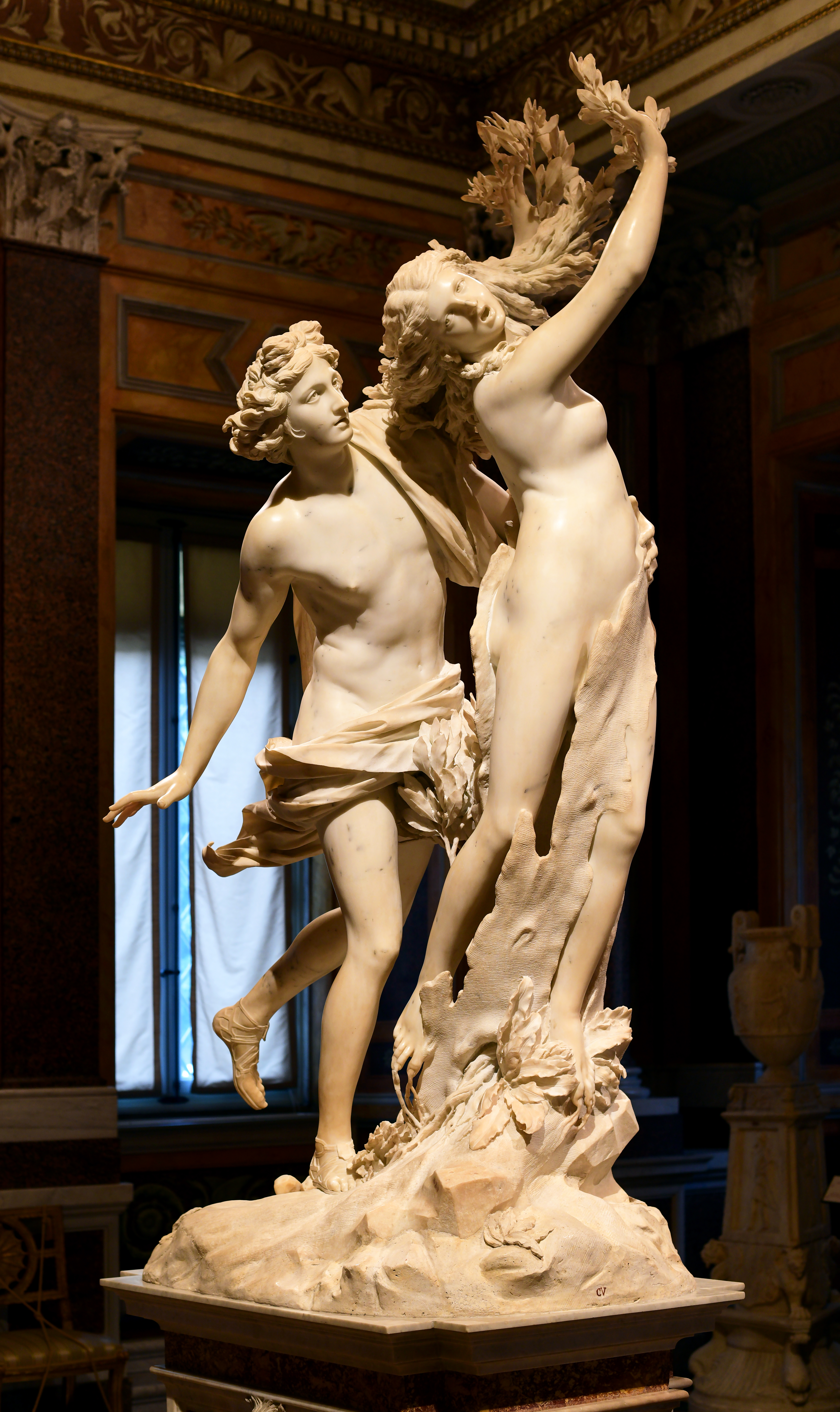
- Artist: Gian Lorenzo Bernini
- Catalogue: 18
- Type: Sculpture
- Medium: Marble
- Dimensions: 243 cm (96 in)
- Location: Galleria Borghese, Rome
- Preceded by: David (Bernini)
- Followed by: Bust of Antonio Cepparelli

Apollo and Daphne is a life-sized marble sculpture by the Italian artist Gian Lorenzo Bernini, which was executed between 1622 and ‘25. It is regarded as one of the artistic marvels of the Baroque age. The statue is housed in the Galleria Borghese in Rome, along with several other examples of the artist's most important early works. The sculpture depicts the climax of the story of Apollo and Daphne (Phoebus and Daphne), as written in Ovid's Metamorphoses, wherein the nymph Daphne escapes Apollo's advances by transforming into a laurel tree.

== History ==
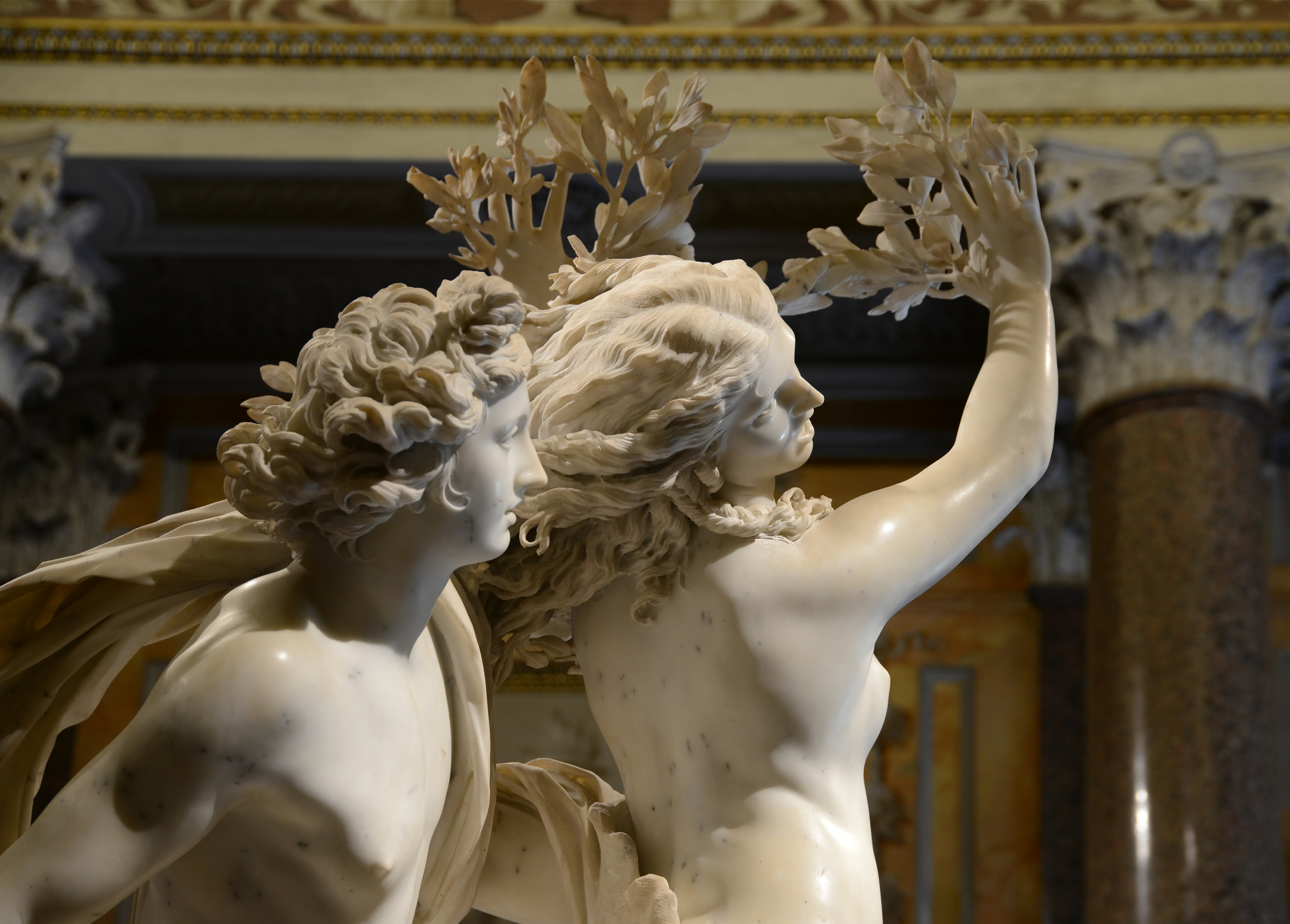
Detail of the sculpture

Apollo and Daphne was the last of a number of important works commissioned by Cardinal Scipione Borghese from Gian Lorenzo Bernini that helped to define Baroque sculpture. Thereafter, Bernini served a succession of popes. Apollo and Daphne was commissioned after Borghese had given an important work of his patronage, Bernini's The Rape of Proserpina (1621–22), to Cardinal Ludovico Ludovisi. Through this generous gesture, Borghese hoped to ingratiate himself to the favored nephew of the new pope, Gregory XV.

Much of the early work on Apollo and Daphne was done in 1622–23, but Bernini's work on his sculpture of David (1623–24) interrupted its completion. Bernini finished Apollo and Daphne in 1625, and it was moved to the Cardinal's Villa Borghese in September of that year. Bernini did not execute the sculpture entirely by his own hand. As was the common practice at that time, he had help from his workshop. Giuliano Finelli, who was a very gifted sculptor, undertook the finer details that show Daphne's conversion from human to tree, such as the twigs and leafs springing from her hands, and her windswept hair. Some art historians, however, discount the importance of Finelli's contribution, since he was merely realizing Bernini's creative vision. Apollo and Daphne's enthusiastic reception began as soon as the work was unveiled.

== Description ==
After a lengthy pursuit, Apollo thinks he has finally caught Daphne. He has a hand on what he thinks is her hip, but her flesh is already turning into the bark of a tree. Apollo's billowing drapes convey the speed with which he has given chase.

While the sculpture may be appreciated from multiple angles, it was designed with a front side and a back side. Bernini planned for it to be viewed slightly from the right, where the work would have been visible from the doorway where it was located. Viewing the sculpture from this angle allowed the observer to see the reactions of Apollo and Daphne simultaneously, and thus to understand the narrative of the story in a single instant, without the need to move position.

When viewed from the left, neither face and little of Daphne's body is visible. Instead, we see a tangle of hair and we can readily see the structural braces that Bernini built into the sculpture: "the carefully designed solid, interlinking forms that connect and support one another." From the right side, however, many details seem to be "impossibly light and fragile." Ultimately, however, the sculpture was moved to the middle of the room, where it can be seen from all angles.

Like Bernini's 1622 sculpture The Rape of Proserpina, Apollo and Daphne has a cartouche with a moral aphorism by Pope Urban VIII. Attributing Christian moral value to a pagan subject was a way of justifying the statue's presence in the Borghese villa.

== Iconography ==
When Phoebus (Apollo), fated by Cupid's love-exciting arrow, sees Daphne, the maiden daughter of Peneus, a river god, he is filled with wonder at her beauty and consumed by desire. But Daphne has been fated by Cupid's love-repelling arrow and denies the love of men. As the Nymph flees he relentlessly chases her—boasting, pleading, and promising everything. When her strength is finally spent she prays to her father Peneus:

"Destroy the beauty that has injured me, or change the body that destroys my life." Before her prayer was ended, torpor seized on all her body, and a thin bark closed around her gentle bosom, and her hair became as moving leaves; her arms were changed to waving branches, and her active feet as clinging roots were fastened to the ground—her face was hidden with encircling leaves.

Yet Phoebus lost none of his passion for Daphne:

Even like this Phoebus loved her and, placing his hand against the trunk, he felt her heart still quivering under the new bark. He clasped the branches as if they were parts of human arms, and kissed the wood. But even the wood shrank from his kisses, and the god said:

"Since you cannot be my bride, you must be my tree! Laurel, with you my hair will be wreathed, with you my lyre, with you my quiver. You will go with the Roman generals when joyful voices acclaim their triumph, and the Capitol witnesses their long processions. You will stand outside Augustus's doorposts, a faithful guardian, and keep watch over the crown of oak between them. And just as my head with its uncropped hair is always young, so you also will wear the beauty of undying leaves."

Paean had done: the laurel bowed her newly made branches, and seemed to shake her leafy crown, like a head giving consent.

== Critical reception ==
It is difficult to overstate the importance and the immediate effect of the statues that Bernini made for Scipione Borghese: "Bernini proved that he could make images that dazzled visually, told a story with high drama, and aroused powerful sentiments. These acclaimed statues had qualities the church was seeking, and they helped propel Bernini on his path to become the chief visual propagandist of the Counter-Reformation, and the single most important creator of Baroque Rome." Since his work was so synonymous with the Baroque, Bernini's critical fortunes often rose and fell with those of the Baroque in general.

Appreciation for Apollo and Daphne continued, sometimes surviving the decline of Bernini's reputation after his death. A French traveler in 1839 commented that the group is "astonishing both for mechanism of art and elaborateness, is full of charm in the ensemble and the details." One 19th-century literary journal considered it the only Bernini work worthy of lasting praise. Others were less positive. An English travel writer in 1829 noted Bernini's technical skill but added that the sculpture "bears all the want of judgment, taste, and knowledge of that age", going on to criticize the appearance of Apollo for being too like a shepherd and not enough like a god.

More recent historians have been much more positive. Robert Torsten Petersson calls it "an extraordinary masterpiece ... suffused with an energy that works out of the tips of the laurel leaves and Apollo's hand and drapery." C.D. Dickerson III says The Rape of Proserpina, David, and Apollo and Daphne are “widely considered the high points of Bernini’s entire career — and even of all seventeenth century sculpture.”

== See also ==
- List of works by Gian Lorenzo Bernini
