= David (Bernini) =

Marble sculpture by Gian Lorenzo Bernini

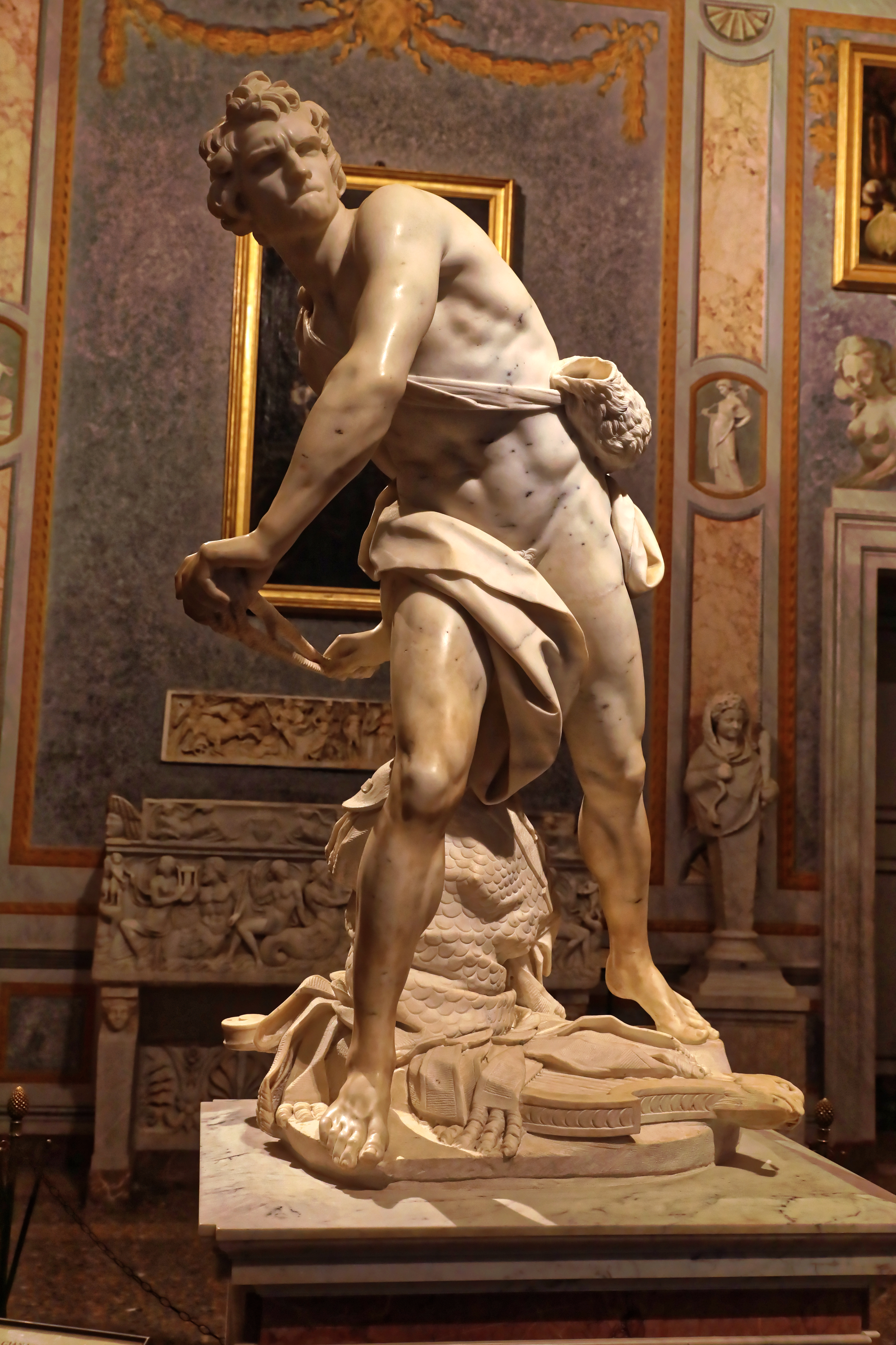
- Artist: Gian Lorenzo Bernini
- Year: 1623–24
- Catalogue: 17
- Type: Sculpture
- Subject: David
- Dimensions: 170 cm (67 in)
- Location: Galleria Borghese, Rome; 41°54′50.4″N 12°29′31.2″E
- Preceded by: Bust of Carlo Antonio del Pozzo
- Followed by: Apollo and Daphne (Bernini)

David is a life-size marble sculpture by Gian Lorenzo Bernini. The sculpture was one of many commissions to decorate the villa of Bernini's patron Cardinal Scipione Borghese – where it still resides today, as part of the Galleria Borghese. It was completed in the course of eight months in 1623 and ‘24.

The subject of the work is the biblical David, about to throw the stone that will bring down Goliath, which will allow David to behead him. Compared to earlier works on the same theme (notably the David of Michelangelo), the sculpture broke new ground in its implied movement and its psychological intensity.

== Background ==
External videos
- smARThistory - Bernini's David

Between 1618 and 1625 Bernini was commissioned to undertake various sculptural work for the villa of one of his patrons, Cardinal Scipione Borghese. In 1623 – only yet 24 years old – he was working on the sculpture of Apollo and Daphne, when, for unknown reasons, he abandoned this project to start work on the David. According to records of payment, Bernini had started on the sculpture by mid–1623, and his contemporary biographer, Filippo Baldinucci, states that he finished it in seven months.

David was Scipione Borghese's last commission for Bernini. Even before it was finished, Bernini's friend and protector Maffeo Barberini was elected pope, as Pope Urban VIII.

== Subject matter ==
The sculpture shows a scene from the Old Testament First Book of Samuel. The Israelites are at war with the Philistines whose champion, Goliath, has challenged the Israelite army to settle the conflict by single combat. The young shepherd David has just taken up the challenge, and is about to slay Goliath with a stone from his sling:

48 When the Philistine [Goliath] arose and came and drew near to meet David, David ran quickly toward the battle line to meet the Philistine. 49 And David put his hand in his bag and took out a stone and slung it and struck the Philistine on his forehead. The stone sank into his forehead, and he fell on his face to the ground.

David's clothing is typical of shepherd's attire. At his feet lies the armour of Israel's King, Saul, given to David for battle. The armor was shed, as it was too large, David was unaccustomed to it and thus could fight better without. At his feet is his harp, often included as an iconographic device of David in reference to David the Psalmist and being a talented harpist.

== Influences ==
The biblical David was a popular subject among Renaissance artists and had been treated by sculptors such as Donatello (c.1440s), Verrocchio (1473-1475) and Michelangelo (1501-1504). Bernini's David, though engaging with these works, differed from them in some significant ways.

For one thing, the sculpture is no longer self-contained, but interacts with the space around it. Not since the sculptures of the Hellenistic period, such as the Winged Victory of Samothrace, had sculptures been involved in their surroundings like those of Bernini. A likely source for Bernini's figure was the Hellenistic Borghese Gladiator. The motion of the gladiator preparing to attack is similar to how David is swinging his sling. Another difference lies in the moment that Bernini has chosen to depict. Michelangelo's David differs from those of Donatello and Verrocchio in that it shows David preparing for the battle, rather than victorious afterwards. Bernini, on the other hand, chose to portray David in the act of throwing the stone. This represented a novelty; throwing figures were extremely rare in post-Antiquity sculptures. The motion motif did exist in painting, however, and one example was Annibale Carracci's fresco of the Cyclops Polyphemus throwing a stone. Bernini is likely to have known Carracci's Polyphemus; not only was it to be found in the Galleria Farnese in Rome, but Carracci was the painter Bernini ranked as fourth among the greatest ever.

Bernini may also have been familiar with the writings of Leonardo da Vinci on the subject. Da Vinci, in his Treatise on Painting, deals with exactly the question of how to portray a throwing figure. It is possible that Bernini applies this theory to his David:

If you represent him beginning the motion, then the inner side of the outstretched foot will be in line with the chest, and will bring the opposite shoulder over the foot on which his weight rests. That is: the right foot will be under his weight, and the left shoulder will be above the tip of the right foot.

— Leonardo da Vinci, Treatise on Painting

Another potential candidate as inspiration for Bernini's David is the celebrated 5th century BC Discobolus by Myron. However, the problem with this theory is that the Discobolus was in the early 17th century only known from literary sources; the torsos of copies that had survived were not correctly identified until 1781. Both Quintilian and Lucian wrote of the statue, but the descriptions were of a figure stretching or flexing, rather than being in the act of throwing.

== Style and composition ==
The Baroque saw significant changes in the art of sculpture; Bernini was at the forefront of this. The statues of the Renaissance masters had been strictly frontal, dictating the spectator to view it from one side, and one side only. Bernini's David is a three-dimensional work that needs space around it and challenges the viewer to walk around it, in order to contemplate its changing nature depending on the angle from which it is seen. The sculpture relates to an unseen entity – in the form of Goliath, the object of David's aggression – as well as to the spectator, caught in the middle of the conflict. The warrior even literally oversteps the boundaries between life and art, putting his toes over the edge of the plinth. The conventions of time, as well as space, were challenged. Instead of the serene constancy of, for example, Michelangelo's David, Bernini has chosen to capture a fraction of time in the course of a continuous movement. Thus the latent energy that permeates Michelangelo's David is here in the process of being unleashed.

On an emotional level, Bernini's sculptures were revolutionary for exploring a variety of extreme mental states, such as the anger seen here. David's face, frowning and biting his lower lip, is contorted in concentrated aggression. According to Baldinucci and Domenico Bernini, Barberini would hold a mirror up to Bernini's face so the artist could model the sculpture on himself. This bears witness to Bernini's working methods, as well as to the close relationship he enjoyed with the future pope.

In addition to attempts at realism, David also followed contemporary conventions about how a military figure should be portrayed. As Albrecht Dürer previously had postulated, the vir bellicosus—the "bellicose man"—was best represented with the rather extreme proportions of a 1:10 head-to-body ratio. Furthermore, the warrior has a facies leonina, or the face of a lion, characterized by a receding forehead, protruding eyebrows, and a curved nose (David was later to become the "Lion of Judah").

== See also ==
- List of works by Gian Lorenzo Bernini
