= Apollo and Daphne =

Story from ancient Greek mythology

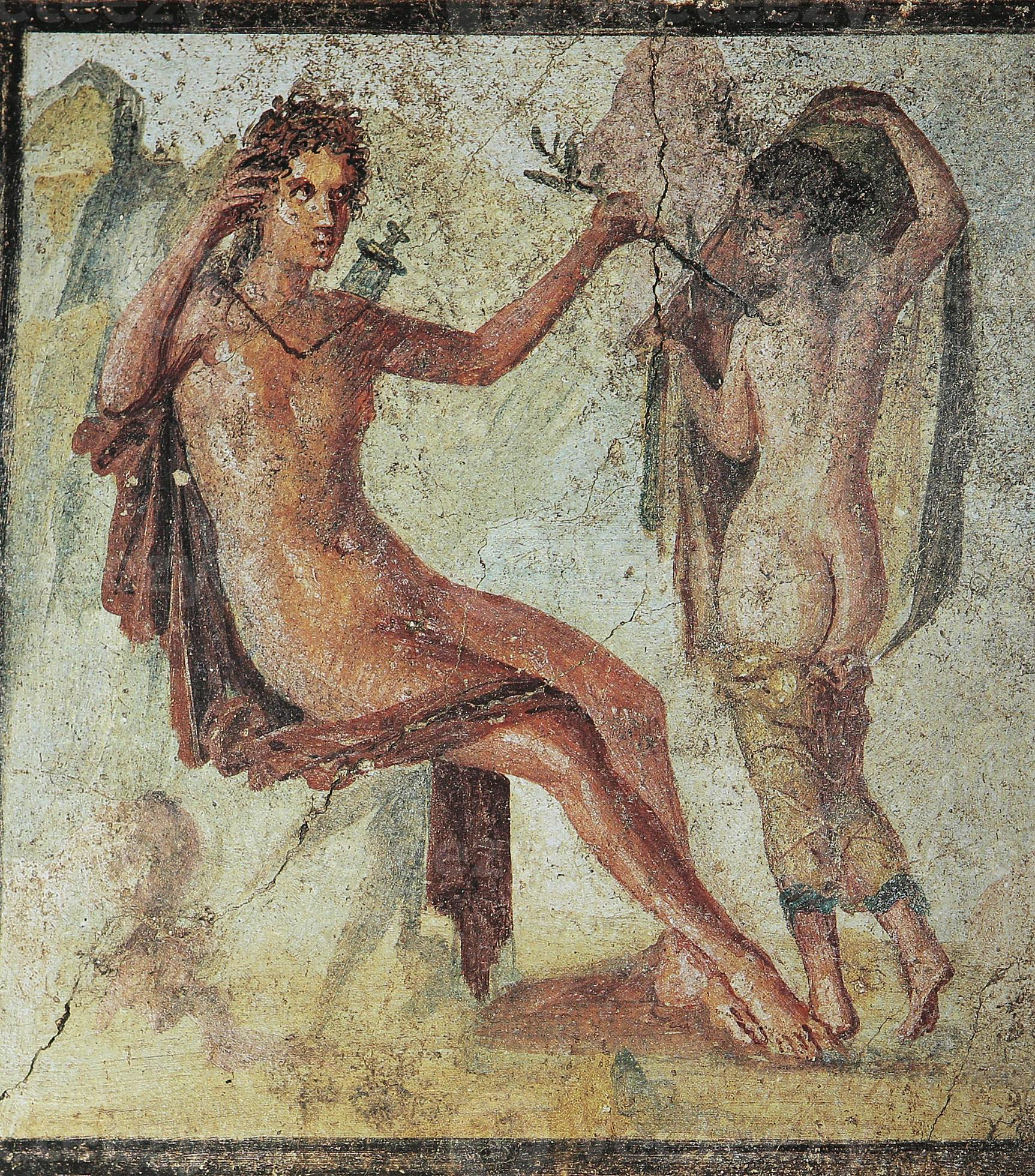
Roman, Apollo and Daphne, c. 62–79 A.D., fresco from South wall of Casa dell’Efebo, Pompeii, showing Apollo holding a sprig of laurel, while Daphne is perhaps dancing. It likely reflects a pre-Ovidian source.

Apollo and Daphne is an Ancient Greek transformation or metamorphosis myth. No written or artistic versions survive from ancient Greek mythology, so it is likely Hellenistic in origin. It was retold by Roman authors in the form of an amorous vignette.

The myth purportedly explains the origin of the laurel tree and its connection to Apollo, although "Apollo was emphatically associated with the laurel before the advent of the Daphne myth." Details vary between different versions, but the beautiful nymph Daphne rejects the love of Apollo and is turned into a tree.

== History ==
The earliest known source of this myth is Parthenius, a Greek poet who lived during the 1st century BCE, however, the most well-known and lyrical telling was by the Roman poet Ovid in his Metamorphoses (I.438–567), a collection of Greek fables first written in 8 CE.

== Mythos ==
Apollo's priestess employed the use of laurel leaves at Delphi and they also became the symbol of victory and achievement as laurel wreaths were given to the victors of the Pythian Games.

=== Characters ===
The story generally involves three main players:

- Apollo (Phoebus) – Greek god of healing, archery, music and arts, sunlight, knowledge, and patron of Delphi. Regarded as a great warrior and as the most beautiful of the gods.
- Eros (Cupid, Amor) – god of love and sex; also known for his use of bow and arrow. He was often depicted as a winged boy, beginning in the Hellenistic period.
- Daphne – a naiad (nymph), or huntress of Artemis. Her parentage varies, depending on the source, but it's generally understood that her mother is either the nymph Creusa or Gaia and her father was a river god (either Peneus or Ladon).

As a Roman, Ovid called the gods by their Roman names (i.e. Juno and Jupiter instead of Hera and Zeus). However, despite the Roman counterpart of Apollo sharing the same name, Ovid switches between calling him Phoebus and Apollo. It would seem that this reference is used when referring to Apollo in his role as sun god, since the name is an epithet of his maternal grandmother Phoibe ("the bright one"), but there isn't agreement among scholars on this.

=== Ovid's version ===
Ovid breaks the myth out into five parts, beginning with Apollo slaying the Python and ending with the creation of the Pythian Crown. Ovid's Metamorphoses, tr. Anthony S. Kline version of the story translates it in the following way:

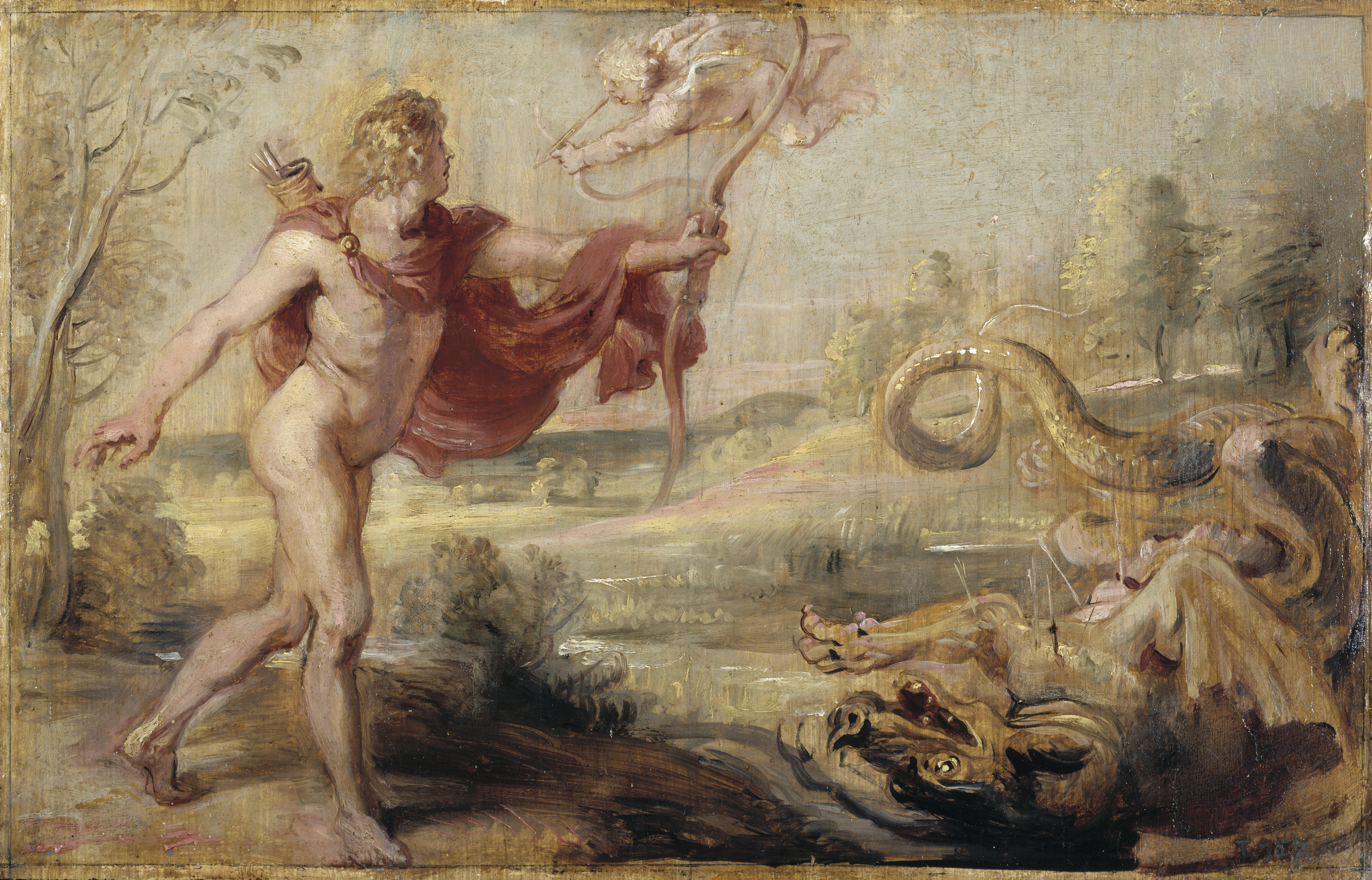
Peter Paul Rubens – Apollo and the Python, 1636–1637

==== Defeat of Python (I:438–472) ====
Apollo and Daphne's story takes place right after the great snake that terrorized mankind is slain by Apollo. Apollo pierced the Python with 1,000 arrows and then founded the sanctuary of Delphi atop of the Python's dead body. This sanctuary became home to the famous oracle, Pythia, and the sacred Pythian Games were held to celebrate his victory. The winners were, at first, honored with oak wreaths, since the laurel did not yet exist.

Afterwards, Apollo spots Eros stringing his bow and comments:

"Impudent boy, what are you doing with a man's weapons? That one is suited to my shoulders, since I can hit wild beasts of a certainty, and wound my enemies... You should be intent on stirring the concealed fires of love with your burning brand, not laying claim to my glories!"

Eros, angered by Apollo's implication that one god's abilities could be greater or lesser than another's, flies to the peak of Mount Parnassus then draws and fires two arrows: "one kindles love, the other dispels it. The one that kindles is golden with a sharp glistening point, the one that dispels is blunt with lead beneath its shaft. With the second he transfixed [Daphne], but with the first he wounded Apollo piercing him to the marrow of his bones."

==== Apollo sees Daphne (I:473–503) ====
Having taken after Apollo's sister, Artemis (Diana), Daphne spurned her many potential lovers, preferring instead to spend her time in the woods, exploring the forest and hunting. Due to her emulation of Artemis, she had dedicated herself to perpetual virginity. Her father, the river god Peneus, demanded that she get married and give him grandchildren. She, however, begged her father to let her remain unmarried; he eventually complies, but tells her that her beauty makes it impossible to prevent would-be suitors from beckoning to her.

As soon as Apollo spots her in the woods he falls in love. His own powers of foresight prevent him from being able to tell the ultimate outcome of his pursuit. He quickly calls and rushes to her, but she immediately flees "swifter than the lightest breath of air and resists his words calling her back again."

==== Apollo pursues and begs Daphne to be with him (I:504–524) ====
Despite her not yet knowing who pursues her, Apollo seems to know exactly who she is, calling, "Wait nymph, daughter of Peneus, I beg you! I who am chasing you am not your enemy." He comments that she is running from him as prey would from a predator, but tells her that he is spurred on by love and a desire to be with her, not destroy her, so she should have pity on him. He then says that he is worried that she will be injured in the chase and cause him guilt, so if she slows down he will too, but she continues.

He goes on to finally reveal to her who he is—stating that he's not just some random farmer or shepherd, but rather "Delphi's lands are mine, Claros and Tenedos, and Patara acknowledges me king. Jupiter is my father. Through me what was, what is, and what will be, are revealed. Through me strings sound in harmony, to song." He mentions that, even though he is a master archer and patron of medicine, "an arrow truer than mine, has wounded my free heart! ... But love cannot be healed by any herb..."

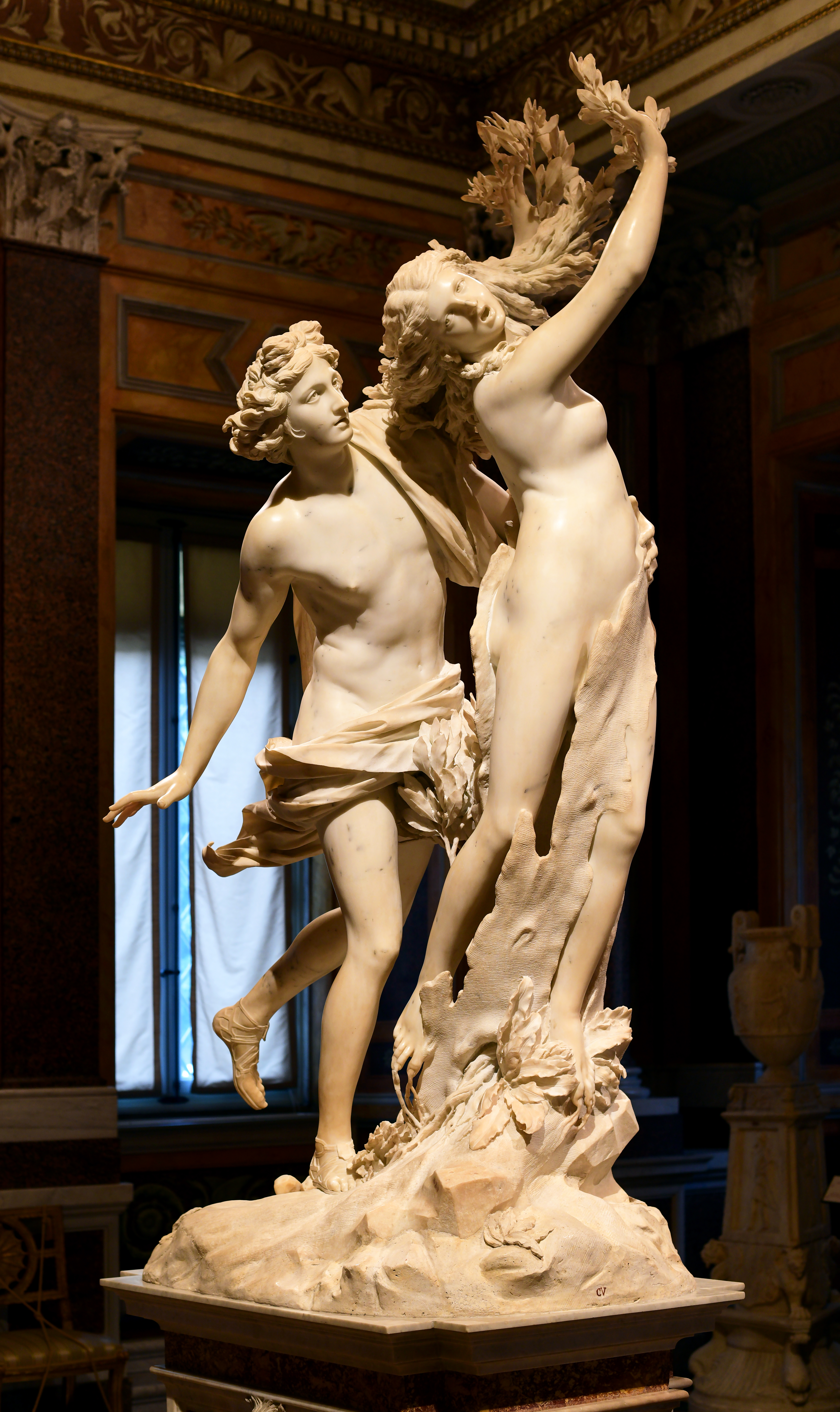
Gian Lorenzo Bernini's Apollo and Daphne.

==== Daphne becomes the laurel (I:525–552) ====
Apollo continually followed her, begging her to stay, but the nymph continued to reject him. They were evenly matched in the race until Eros intervened, urging Apollo on until he is at full speed. He reaches out to grab her, but she manages to escape his grasp and quicken her pace. Eros further assists Apollo by giving him wings, then hangs onto Daphne's shoulders in an attempt to slow her gait.

They were soon within sight of her father's waters. Exhausted, overcome by the efforts of her escape, and sensing that she was about to be caught, she ran toward the banks and cried out, "Help me father! If your streams have divine powers change me, destroy this beauty that pleases too well!" No sooner than the cry left her mouth she felt "a heavy numbness seized her limbs, thin bark closed over her breast, her hair turned into leaves, her arms into branches, her feet so swift a moment ago stuck fast in slow-growing roots, her face was lost in the canopy." She had become the laurel tree.

==== (19/08) Apollo honors the laurel (I:553–567) ====
Even in this state, Apollo could not help but love her. He touched the trunk of the tree and could feel her heartbeat. He tried to kiss the bark, but the wood shrank away from him still. In spite of Daphne's clear terror and fervent insistence that he leave her be, Apollo vowed to honor her forever, "We kiss before we burn. You shall be treasured forever as my now precious tree." He says that he will wear her leaves in his hair, will use her wood to make his bow and lyre, and that a crown made of her branches will adorn the heads of royalty and champions of game and battle.

Apollo also used his powers of eternal youth and immortality to render Daphne evergreen, "you also will wear the beauty of undying leaves." The laurel bowed her branches, her leaves seemingly shuddered in surrender. She does not wish to burn with him.

== Apollo and Daphne in art ==
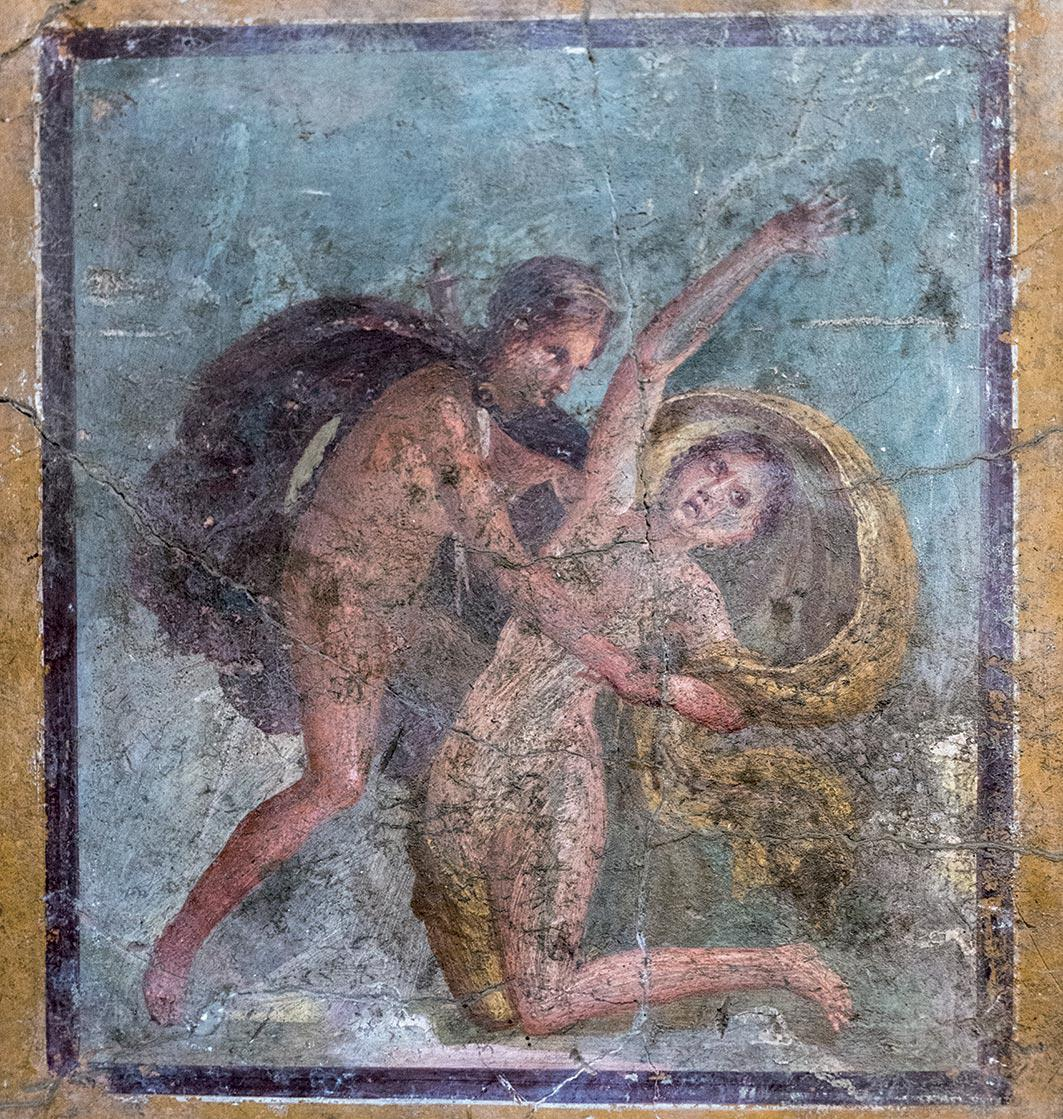
Apollo and Daphne, fresco from Pompeii, 1st century

Two stone dishes from present-day Pakistan (the ancient region of Gandhara) in the Metropolitan Museum of Art have been associated with the Apollo and Daphne myth. Their dating is controversial, with the most recent publication using the date 1st century B.C.

Like the Apollo and Daphne frescoes from Pompeii (such as the one illustrated above), the Gandharan dishes do not depict "the kind of full-blown, full-flight transformational image based on Ovid that is so familiar from Renaissance, Baroque, and later art", because they reflect earlier sources.

On the basis of surviving Roman frescoes in which Apollo serenades a woman, Peter E. Knox believes there was a lost version of the myth in which "Apollo first attempts to woo the maiden with song before he becomes violent." Ovid's version of the myth is the earliest one to include Cupid, and he probably invented the arrow that makes Daphne despise Apollo. Instead of a chase concluding with a transformation initiated by a paternal water god, pre-Ovidian versions might have used a substitution, with Daphne swallowed up by the earth (her mother Gaia).

The Daphne Ewer, a gilded glass vessel, probably from Antioch, c. 175–225, (Corning Museum Of Glass, Corning, New York) has Greek letters that identify the protagonists of the scene, which point to an Eastern literary source.

Apollo and Daphne, a 5th–6th century A.D. ivory relief from Egypt (Ravenna, Italy, National Museum) features a musical Apollo who is serenading Daphne. Thus it also seems to reflect Knox's "Song of Apollo", the lost literary account. At the same time, it is also a Christianized version of the myth.

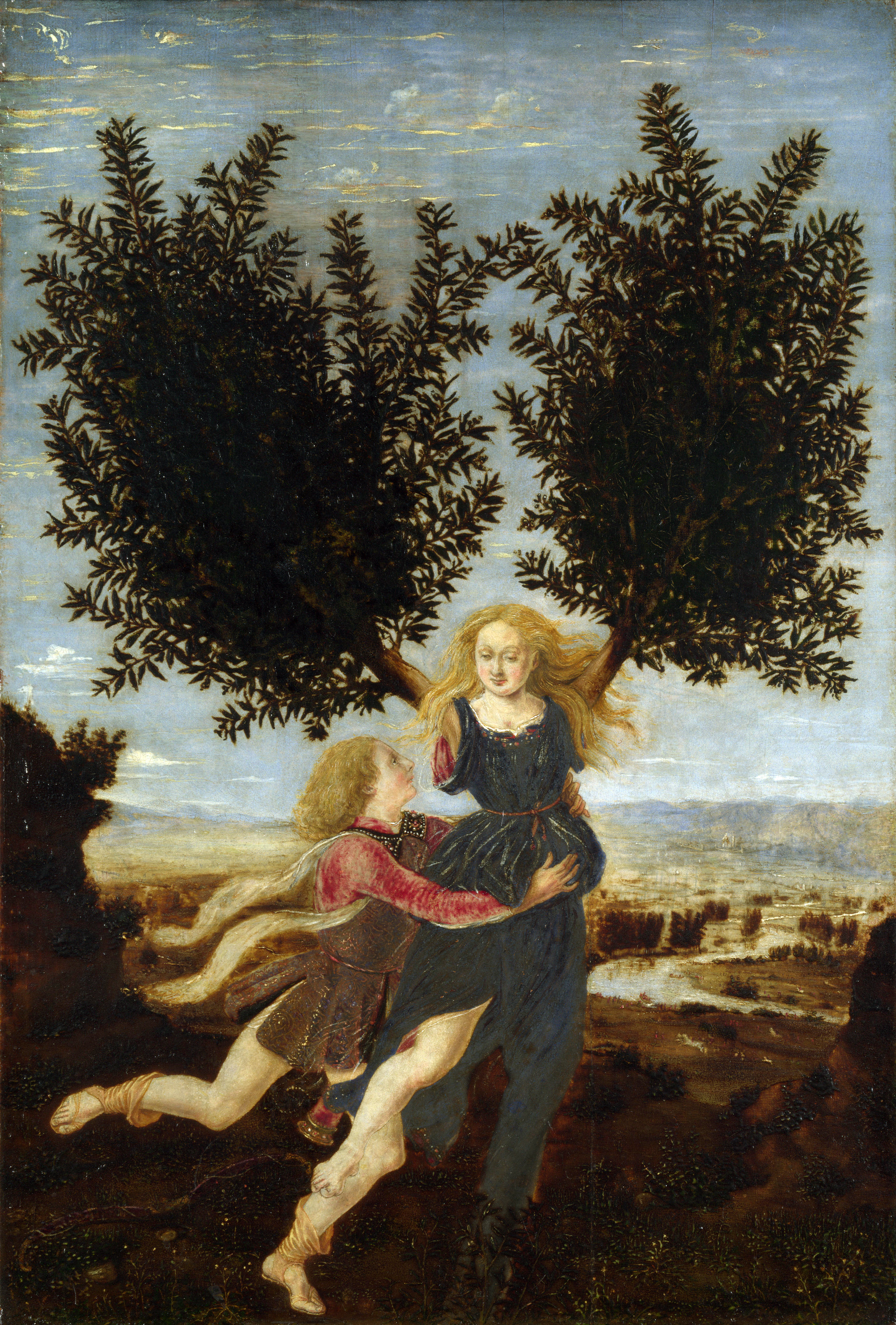
Apollo and Daphne attributed to Piero del Pollaiuolo

Renaissance artists such as Antonio del Pollaiuolo and his brother Piero drew inspiration from Greek mythology in a number of their works. In Piero Pollaiolo's painting Apollo and Daphne (National Gallery, London), both protagonists are shown dressed in Renaissance garments, endowing this version of the theme with a courtly character. Here again, the myth has been Christianized: as Daphne turns into the laurel tree, virtue and chastity triumph.

The Mannerist artist Andrea Meldolla, called Schiavone, made a strange Apollo and Daphne etching (c. 1538–40, Metropolitan Museum of Art) in which one of Daphne's legs sprouts roots directly from her father's body. In a small painting by Schiavone from c. 1542–44 (Kunsthistorisches Museum, Vienna), Daphne has both of her feet on her father’s body (though they are not sprouting roots).

Between 1622 and 1625, Gian Lorenzo Bernini helped to inaugurate the age of Baroque sculpture with his life-sized marble statue Apollo and Daphne (Borghese Museum), which is arguably the most remarkable, influential, and impressive version of this theme. Apollo clutches Daphne's hip, catching her in flight, just as her father answers Daphne's pleas to save her from her pursuer. While Daphne begins her metamorphosis into the laurel tree, her flowing hair and her extended fingers sprout twigs and leaves that are so thinly carved they have astonished visitors since the sculpture was first unveiled. Meanwhile, roots descend from her toes and a tree trunk begins to sheath her torso.

The Baroque painter Nicolas Poussin also produced more than one work on the subject, most of which have meditative, solemn characteristics. This is especially true of the 1625 version of the painting (Alte Pinakothek, Munich) which compresses the entire story into one scene. Sculptor Massimiliano Soldani Benzi drew from Bernini's masterpiece to create a smaller, terracotta version of the pair in c. 1700 (Cleveland Museum of Art, Cleveland, Ohio).

The Rococo artist François Boucher made a chalk drawing of Apollo and Daphne (c. 1730s, private collection) in which one of her feet rests on her father's body as her arms blossom into branches and leaves. Giovanni Battista Tiepolo did two oil versions of this subject (Louvre Museum, 1741, and National Gallery of Art, Washington D.C., c. 1755–60). In both paintings, Cupid hides beneath Daphne's garments while her hands sprout leaves.

The Kiss by Gustav Klimt is sometimes interpreted as an iconographic depiction of Apollo kissing Daphne upon her transformation into a laurel tree.

John William Waterhouse's Pre-Raphaelite style Apollo and Daphne, 1908 (private collection), features a Daphne in the guise of one of his typical femme fatales.

Meret Oppenheim's Daphne and Apollo (1943, Lukas Moeschelin collection, Basel) has both Daphne and Apollo undergoing a metamorphosis, which reflects the artist's interest in androgyny.

Milet Andrejevic, a Yugoslavian immigrant to the U.S., set his Apollo and Daphne (1969, Rhode Island School of Design Museum, Providence) in New York's Central Park.

Boris Vallejo, the Peruvian-born fantasy painter, based his Daphne and Apollo (1989, private collection) on Arnold Schwarzenegger and Sandahl Bergman, the warrior queen Valeria from the film Conan the Barbarian (1982).

Ivan Bubentcov, a Russian painter influenced by Tom of Finland, made a queer version of the Apollo and Daphne myth by synthesizing it with the Pygmalion story.

The Apollo and Daphne theme has appeared in many forms within popular culture, including tattoos, cake icing, and jewelry. Heather Roblin's "Daphne & Apollo fingertips" (2013) permit any woman to sprout leaves from her fingertips.
