= Apollo and Daphne (Poussin) =

Painting by Nicolas Poussin

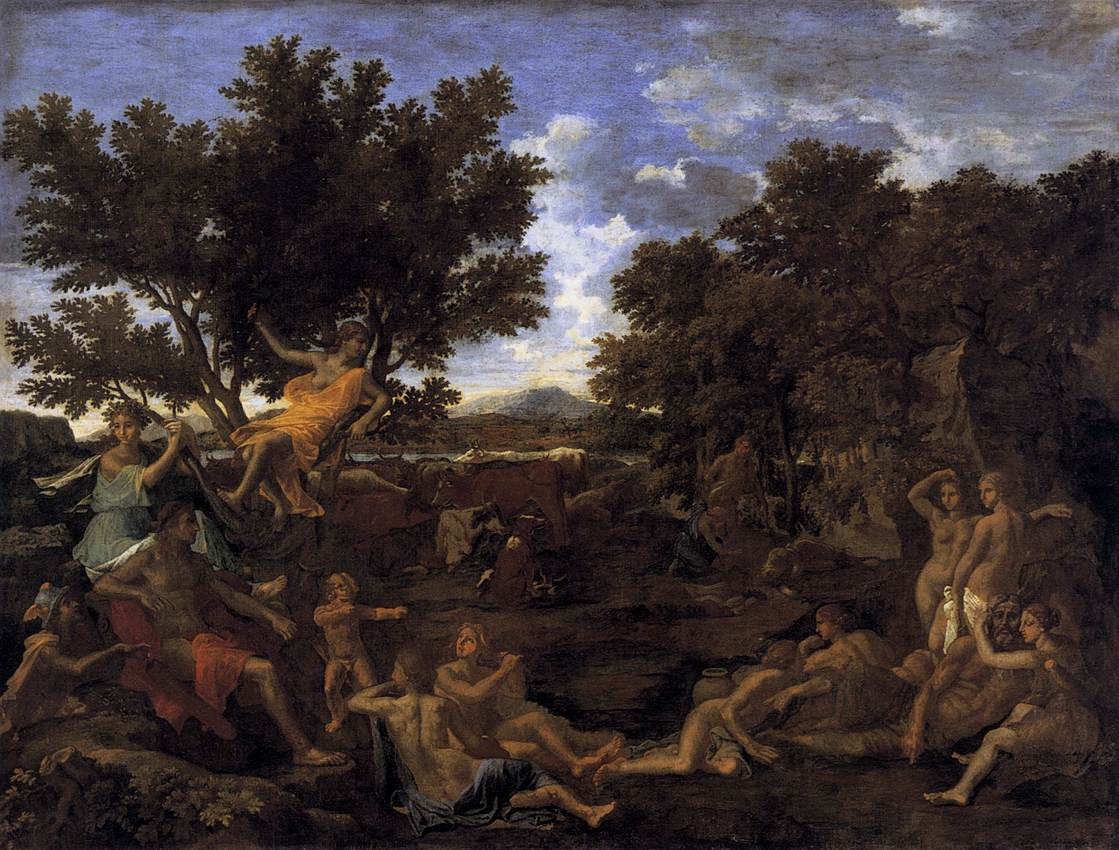
Apollo and Daphne (1661-1664) by Nicolas Poussin

Apollo and Daphne or Apollo in Love with Daphne is an oil on canvas painting by Nicolas Poussin, from 1661-1664, produced shortly before the painter's death. It is held in the Louvre, in Paris.

== History ==
The painter gave it to Cardinal Camillo Massimi and it later entered Guillaume Guillon Lethière's collection. In 1832 it was bought from the collection of Sébastien Érard by Charles Paillet, expert commissioner for the French royal collections. His suggestion that the Musée des beaux-arts de Rouen purchase it was rejected, and it was instead bought by its current owner in 1869.

== See also ==
- List of paintings by Nicolas Poussin

== Bibliography ==
- (in French) Oskar Bätschmann, « Apollon et Daphné (1664) de Nicolas Poussin. Le testament du peintre-poète », dans Nicolas Poussin (1594-1665) : : actes du colloque, musée du Louvre, 19 au 21 octobre 1994, Paris, La Documentation française, 1996, p. 562.
- (in French) Françoise Graziani, « Poussin mariniste : la mythologie des images », in O. Bonfait et al., dir, Poussin et Rome : actes du colloque de l'Académie de France à Rome 16-18 novembre 1994, Paris, Réunion des musées nationaux, 1996, p. 367-385.
- (in French) Marie Pessiot and Pierre Rosenberg, « À propos de la provenance de l'Apollon et Daphné de Poussin », in La Revue du Louvre et des musées de France, 1998, vol. 48, n° 4
- (in French) Clélia Nau, « L’aperception des ressemblances. Métaphores filées dans l’Apollon amoureux de Daphné », in Tangence, 2002, n° 69, p. 27–54 Read online.
- Adele Tutter, « Metamorphosis and the aesthetics of loss: I. Mourning Daphne – The Apollo and Daphne paintings of Nicolas Poussin », dans The International Journal of Psychoanalysis, 2001, vol. 92, n° 2, p. 427-449 Extract online.
- (in French) Nicolas Milovanovic, « Chemins de l'invention : la genèse de l'"Apollon amoureux de Daphné" du Louvre », in Revue de l'art, 2017, n° 198, p. 17-28.
