= Flying Mercury (Giambologna) =

16th-century bronze sculpture by Giambologna

- Mercurio Volante (Italian)
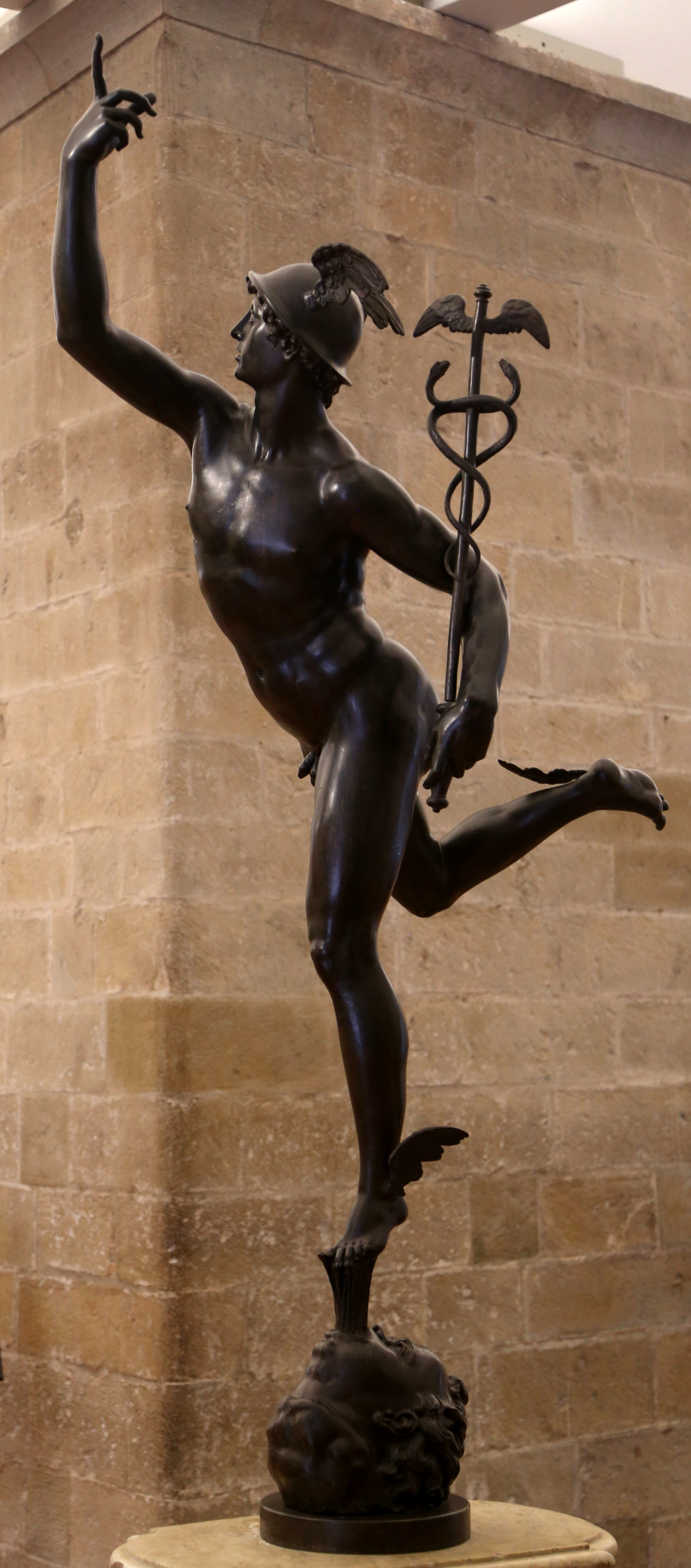
- Mercury, Giambologna
- Artist: Giambologna
- Year: 1578–1580
- Medium: Bronze sculpture
- Movement: Early Mannerism
- Subject: Roman god Mercury
- Dimensions: 187 mt (194 in)
- Location: Bargello Museum (Museo Nazionale del Bargello), Florence

Flying Mercury is a bronze sculpture made by Giambologna in the period 1578–1580. It was much admired due to its elegant depiction and the illusion of weightlessness.

The Flying Mercury was executed by Giambologna several times. His studio produced many copies that were sold to nobles and rich merchants all over Europe, contributing to the diffusion of the Mannerist style.

== Background ==
In the mid-16th century, nearly every Italian sculptor tried his hand at surpassing the representation of pagan images in which Michelangelo had excelled. But the sculptor who undoubtedly achieved this was the Flemish-trained sculptor Giambologna.

Giambologna settled in Florence in 1553, where he spent his most productive years and became a favored sculptor of the Medici's.

In 1563 he was given his first major commission from the papal vice-legate Pier Donato Cesi in Bologna: a monumental bronze statue of Neptune, for the fountain of the same name in Bologna. The Mannerist statue was much admired and contributed to his fame.

In 1583, Giambologna unveiled Abduction of a Sabine Woman in the Piazza della Signoria, a group of three figures in an unprecedented upward serpentine spiral movement composition called figura serpentina (S-curved). The sculpture was not made on commission but to impress the Medicis, an objective he fully achieved and beyond that, the statue was a foundational artwork of Mannerism, a style that was adopted all over Europe. Its influence can be seen even 40 years later, as the inspiration for Bernini's masterpiece, The Rape of Proserpina (1622). The novelty of this marble statue was its masterly depiction of three figures in fluid, upwards motion, as well as its complex, multi-viewpoint composition, which can be fully appreciated only by circling around it. Classical sculptures were mainly made to be seen from the front.

Both of these characteristics are fully in display in the Flying Mercury and are key to its artistic and emotional impact on the viewer. Even to this day, its popularity is undiminished; high quality copies are offered by many online art galleries.

== Versions ==
Giambologna made several versions of the statue in addition to the one in the Bargello.

The first version (1563-1564) was a result of another commission from Papal vice-legate Pier Donato Cesi while Giambologna was still working in the Neptune statue, who requested a “bronze image of Mercury descending from the heavens”. The project was never completed, though a model survives and is at the Civic Medieval Museum in Bologna. It depicts a heavier, wingless Mercury.

In 1564, Cosimo de’ Medici, commissioned a second version half the size than the one at the Bargello, which he sent as a diplomatic gift to Maximilian II of Habsburg, betrothed to his second son Francesco I de' Medici. This version is believed to be lost.

The version in the Bargello was commissioned by Cosimo’s other son, Cardinal Ferdinando I de' Medici, for the Villa Medici in Rome. It was placed at the entrance staircase of the villa, crowning a fountain. This increased the illusion of lightness due to the water emanating from below. It remained there until 1780, when Grand Duke Peter Leopold of Lorraine had it removed to place it in the centre of the new Hall of Modern Bronzes in the Uffizi. Together with all the works in that hall, it was transferred to the Bargello Museum, where it has remained since 1865. The date of completion has generated debate among scholars.

For this larger version, Giambologna had to have done a very detailed and challenging study of mass distribution in order to be able to balance it on the very small area of its left toes, aiming to make the nearly two meter tall statue look weightless.

In 1580 Giambologna started another full sized copy, requested by Cardinal Fernando I de' Medici, which he sent to King Henry IV of France. This is the bronze now at the Louvre Museum.

One of many smaller versions, produced by his studio, made around 1585, is in the Kunsthistorisches Museum) (Museum of Fine Arts) in Vienna.

== Description ==
Giorgio Vasari in his Lives describes the statue as:

... a very ingenious Mercury in the act of flying, standing on one leg and on tiptoe, which was sent to the Emperor Maximilian as something that is certainly very rare.

The Italian art website beCulture provides the following description:

A nude youth, his body strong and polished, stretches lightly upward in a gesture that defies gravity. His right leg is raised and bent backward, echoing the elegant reach of his hand pointing skyward. His torso, supple and dynamic, twists in a graceful spiral, creating a composition of incredible movement. The entire body pivots around the left leg – the only, slender point of support – which rests with an almost unreal grace on the breath of wind-blown from the head of Zephyrus, the west wind.

In Greek mythology Zephyrus was the god of Westerly Wind, a soft wind associated with the coming of spring and with the early summer breezes. (Note: Zephyr is also depicted in the famous Botticelli painting The Birth of Venus, in the Uffizi, in Florence.) The iconographic elements of Mercury in the statue are the caduceus (rod), which he holds in his left hand; the petasos (helmet) on his head; and the talaria (winged sandals).

=== Influences ===
Giambologna's lifelong ambition was to surpass the works of Michelangelo, which created a deep impression on him during his visit to Rome.

His statue was most certainly influenced by the bronze Mercury that Benvenuto Cellini made for one of the niches in the base of his Perseus with the Head of Medusa, for the Piazza de la Signoria, with which it has many similarities.

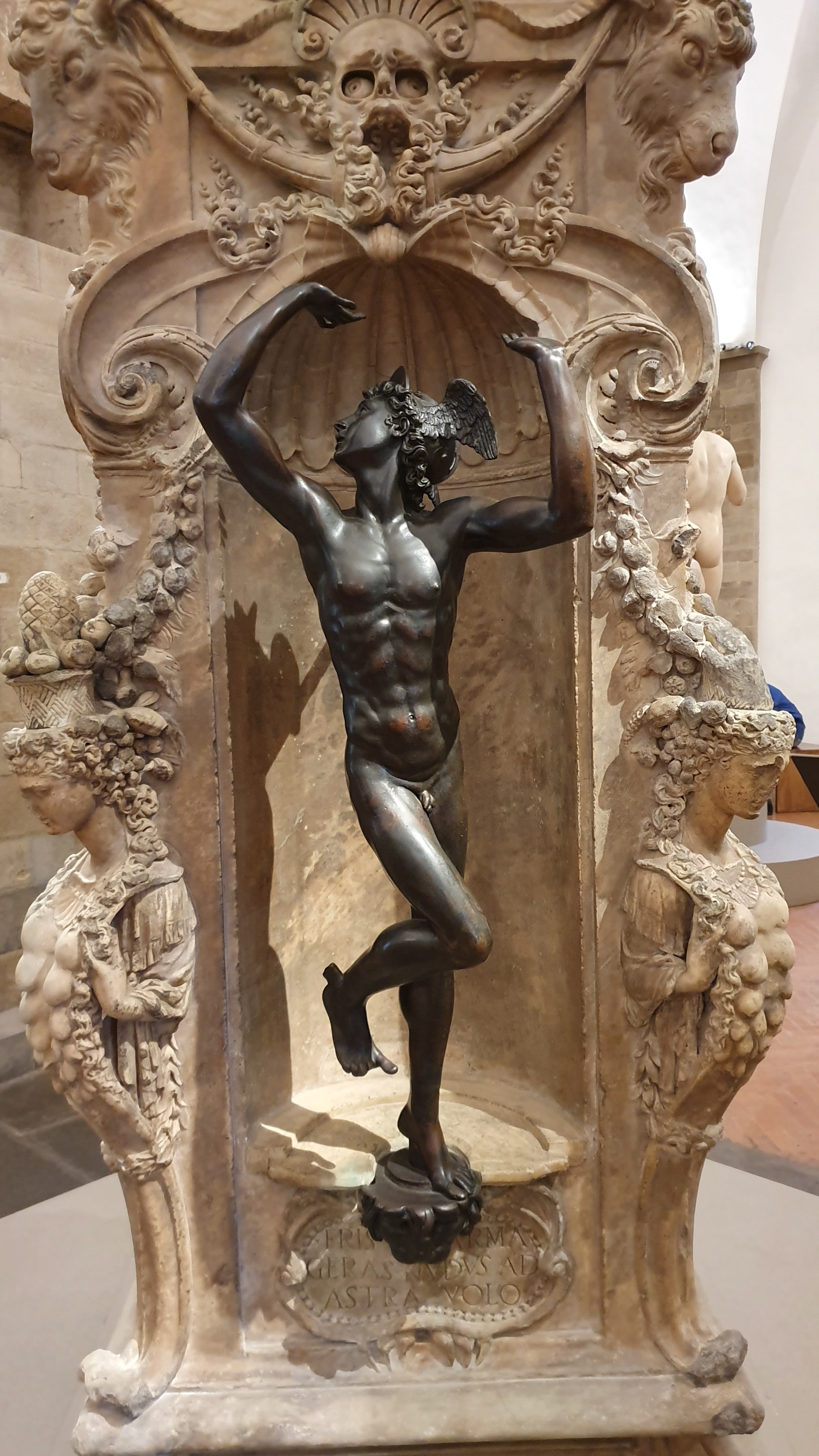
Mercury in niche of the base of Cellini's Perseus statue.

Sprezzatura

The concept of "sprezzatura" was introduced by Baldassare Castiglione in The Book of the Courtier, published in 1528. In it, he gave advice to courtiers on how to increase their standing at court by developing a studied carelessness; "to possess sprezzatura is to make the difficult appear effortless." (Note: Sprezzatura is also the origin of the modern concept of "cool".)

This concept influenced the Italian arts of the mid-16th century. In his Lives, Vasari postulated that the result of applying sprezzatura to art was expressed in the form of “grace”. He considered that many artworks from the preceding century lacked this quality, as despite their admirable proportions and balance, they "lacked subjectivity and freedom to break from the rules." Artists like and Leonardo da Vinci and Raphael gave their masterpieces a sense of "nonchalance" as they did not appear to be forced.

Giambologna's Flying Mercury presents the concept of sprezzatura due to its effortless posture in a large and very complex casting,

== Commercial success ==
By 1587, Giambologna's commercial success allowed him to set up a studio in Borgo Pinti and to hire assistants to reproduce his bronzes.

He used the method of lost-wax casting, that involved making a wax model, covering it with a mould, melting the wax, and pouring molten bronze into the resulting cavity. This delicate method requires great skill, but once mastered by his assistants, it allowed his studio to reuse to produce several copies with the same mould.

== Legacy ==
The quality and quantity of the statues produced by his studio, as well as by other sculptors in Florence motivated by Giambologna's commercial success, generated a demand from all across Europe from nobles and rich merchants for their art collections. In Prague, Rudolf II, Holy Roman Emperor | built up the finest collection of Mannerist art in the world (currently held by the Vienna, Kunsthistorisches Museum).

The export of these fine Florentine statues greatly influenced the dissemination of the Mannerist style in Europe.

== Gallery ==
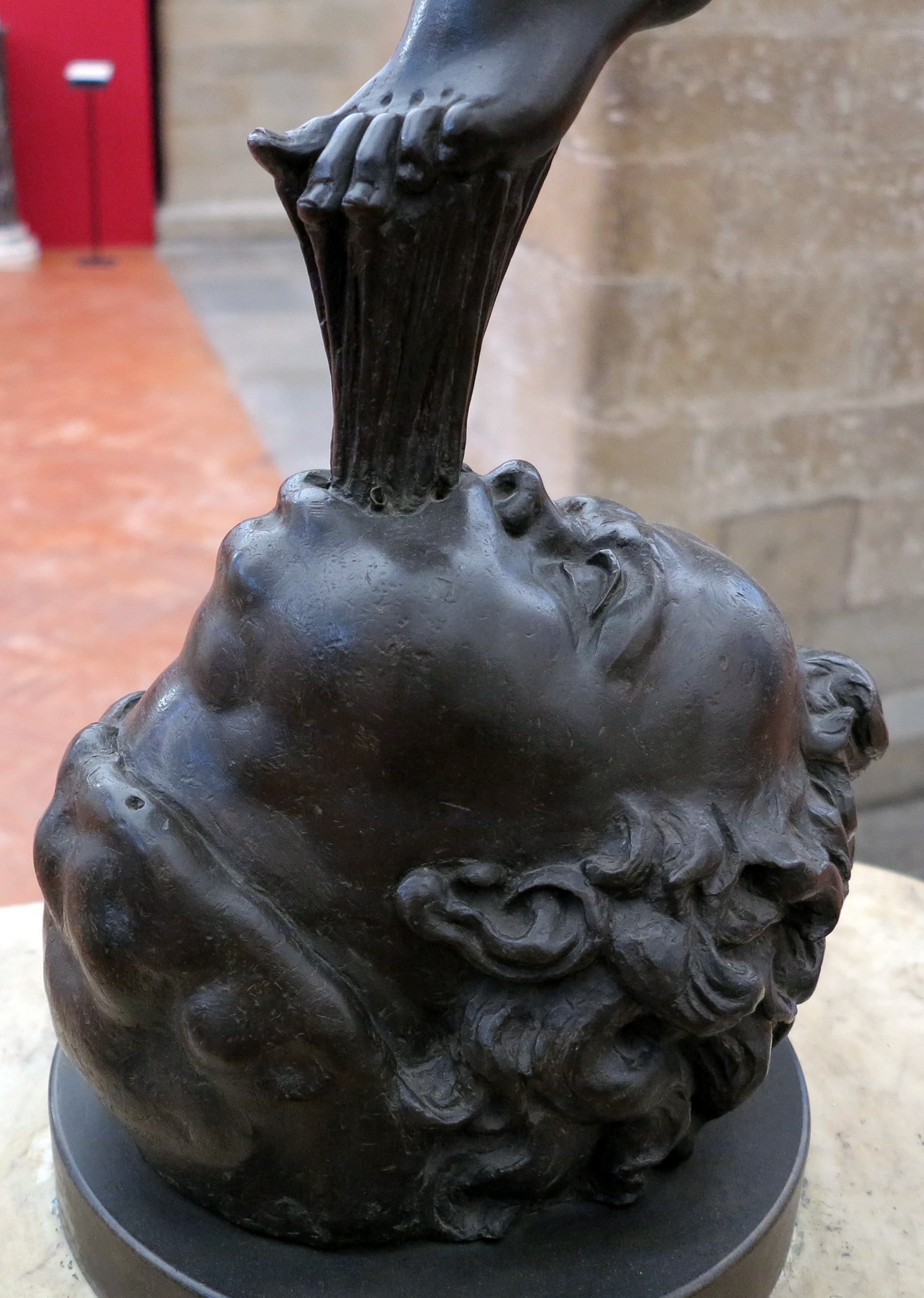
Zephyrus blowing from below.

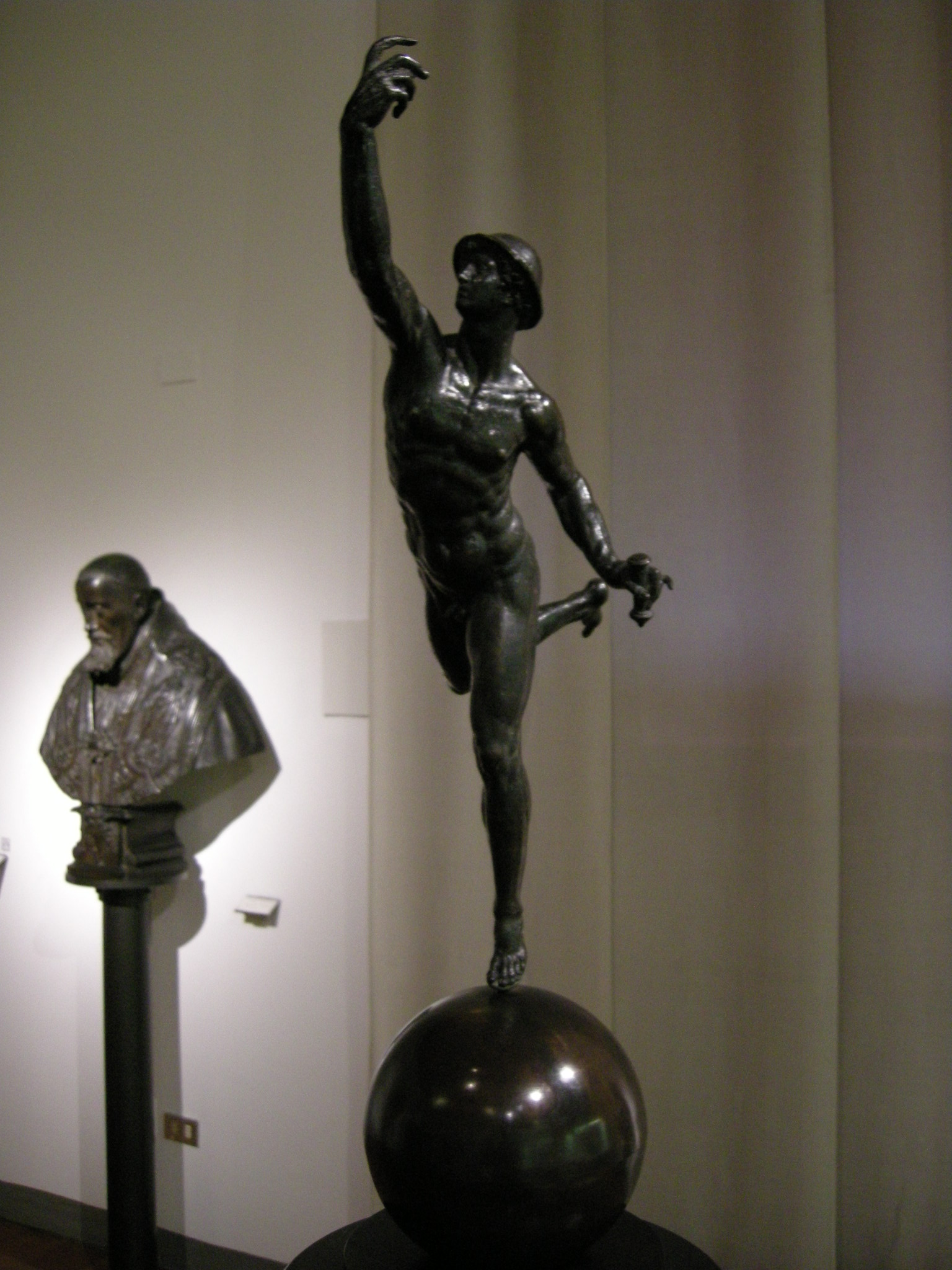
First model of Flying Mercury (Civic Medieval Museum, Bologna).

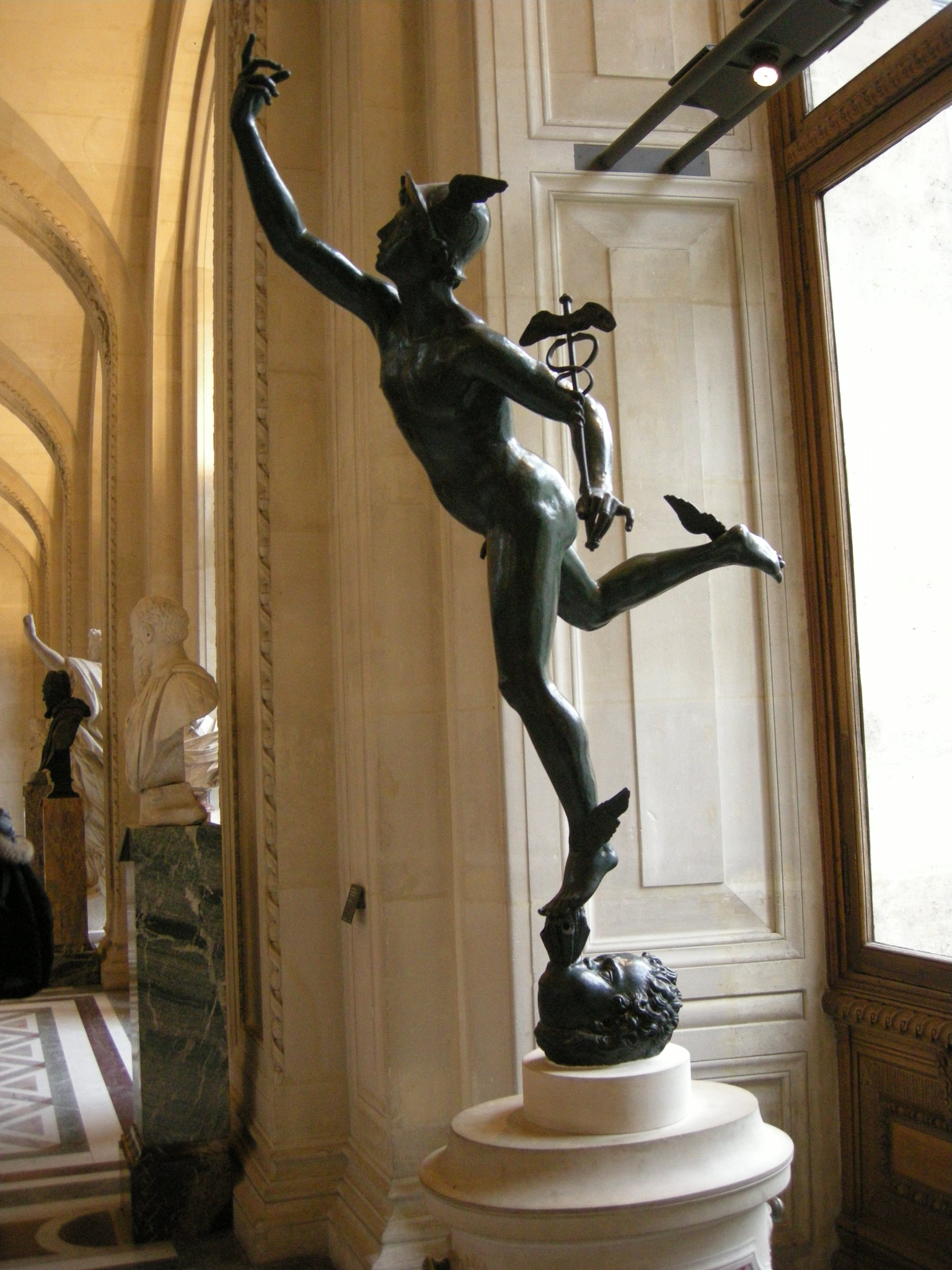
Version made for King Henry IV of France (Louvre)

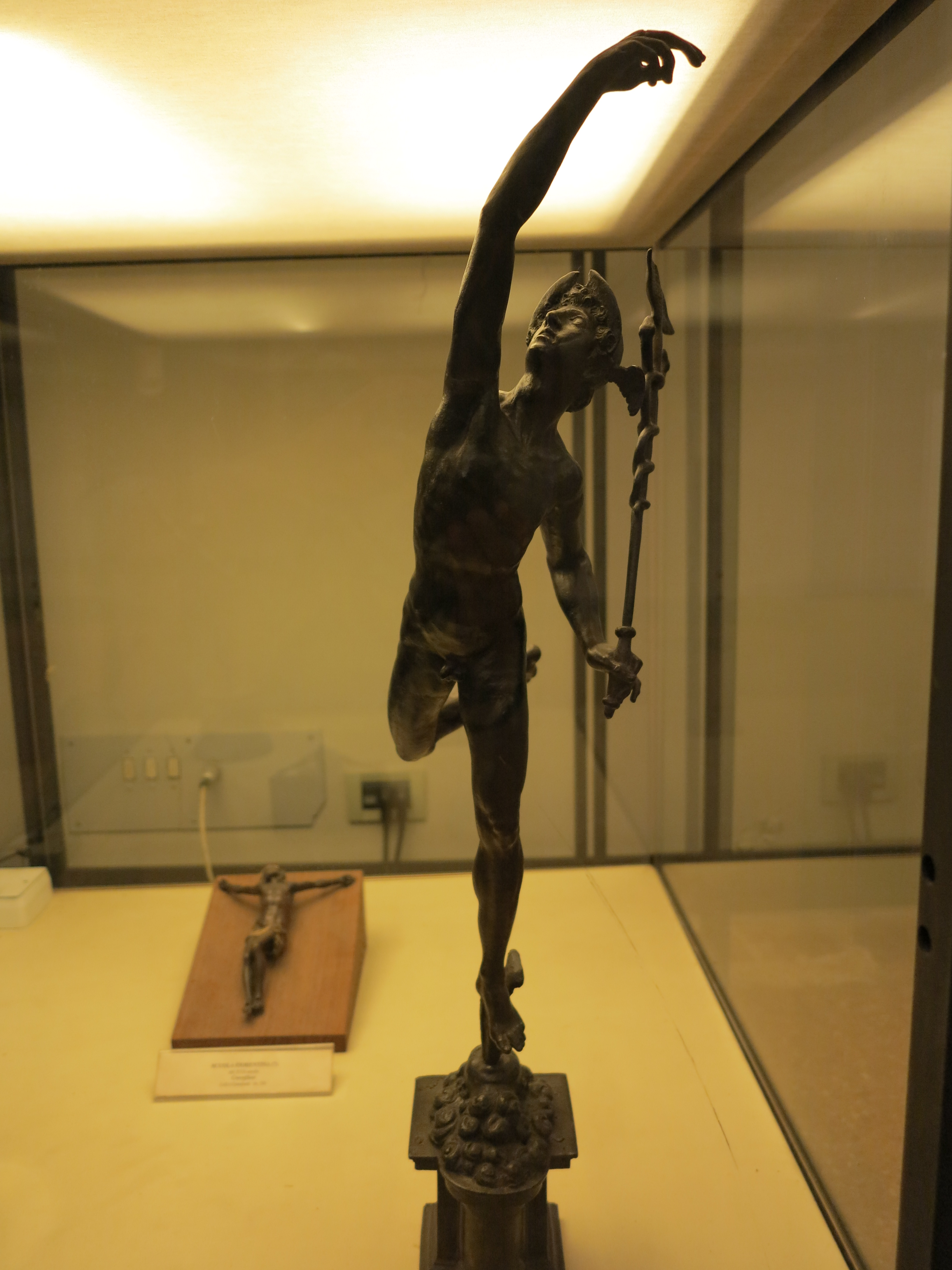
Produced by his studio (ca. 1585) (Ca' d'Oro, Vienna).

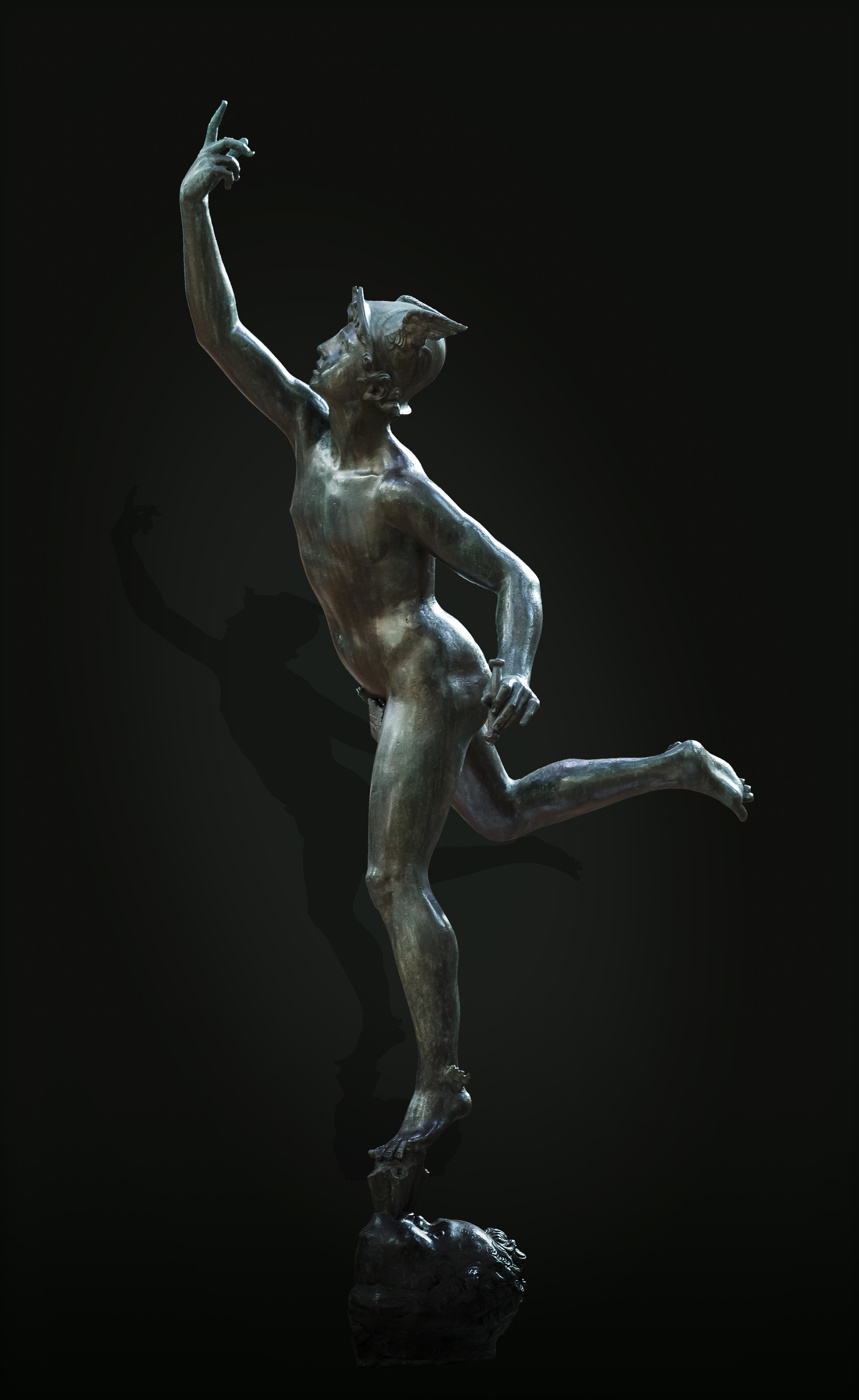
Copy from 1624. (Musée des Augustins, Toulouse).

== See also ==
- Sculpture in the Renaissance Period
