= Galleria dell'Accademia (disambiguation) =

Galleria dell'Accademia or Gallerie dell'Accademia may refer to:

- The Galleria dell'Accademia, an art museum in Florence, Italy
- The Gallerie dell'Accademia, an art museum in Venice, Italy
- The Galleria dell'Accademia di Napoli, an art museum in Naples, Italy
- The Galleria dell'Accademia di San Luca, an art museum in Rome, Italy
