= Gallery of the Academy =

Gallery of the Academy may refer to:

- The Galleria dell'Accademia, an art museum in Florence
- The Gallerie dell'Accademia, an art museum in Venice
- Sackler Gallery and other galleries of the Royal Academy
