= Annunciation (Veronese, Accademia) =

1578 Oil painting by Paolo Veronese in Venice, Italy

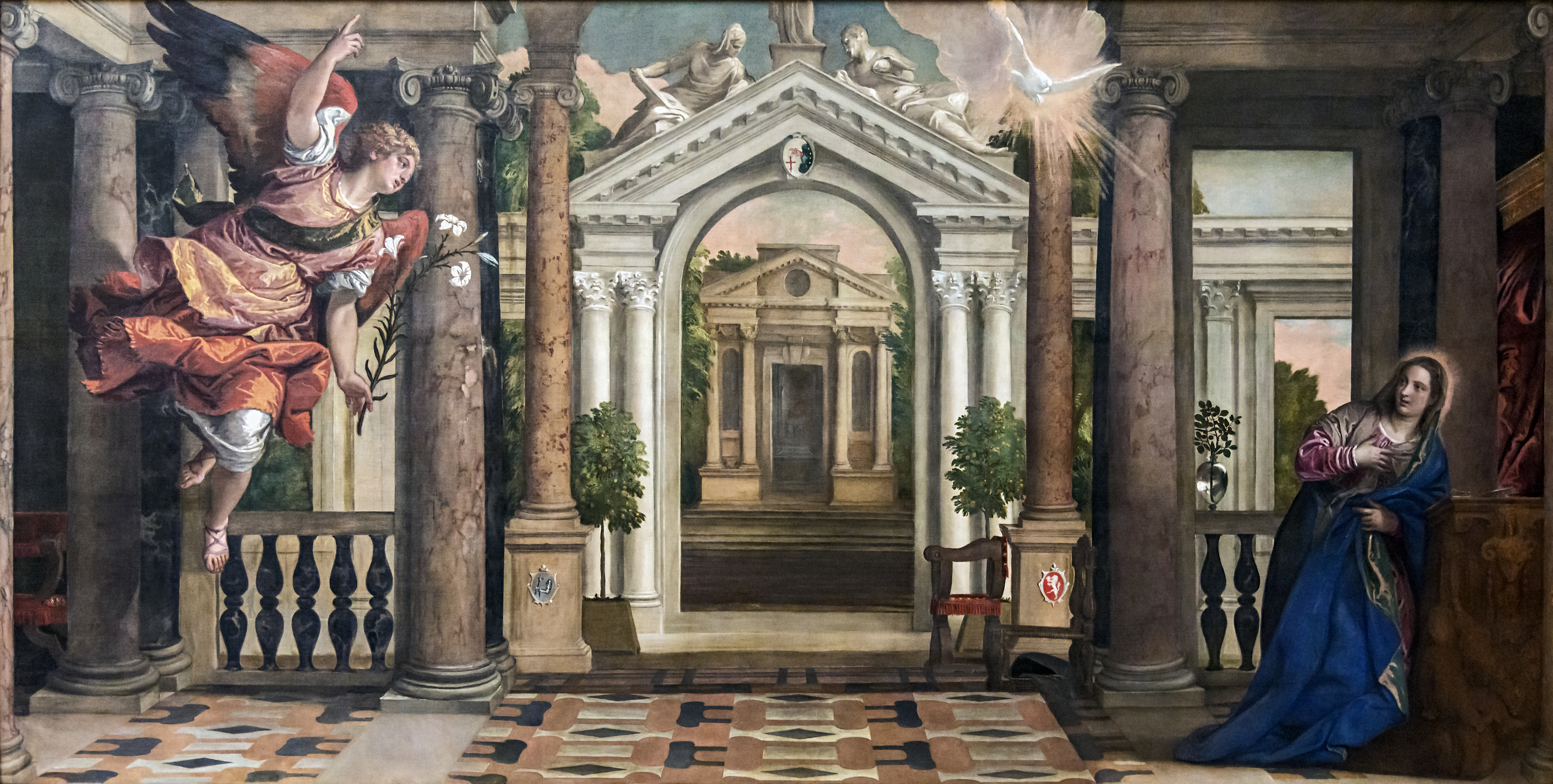

Annunciation is a 1578 oil on canvas painting by Paolo Veronese, particularly notable for its architectural setting. It is in the Galleria dell'Accademia in Venice.

It was commissioned by the Scuola dei Mercanti, whose emblem (a hand blessing a cross) is shown above the central arch into the garden. The coats of arms of the donors' families are shown on the bases of the two yellow-red columns. The painting stayed in the Scuola until 1811, specifically on the wall of a room leading to the Sala dell'Albergo. It is pierced in the centre to allow access to that Sala.
