= Palestrina Pietà =

Sculpture by Michelangelo

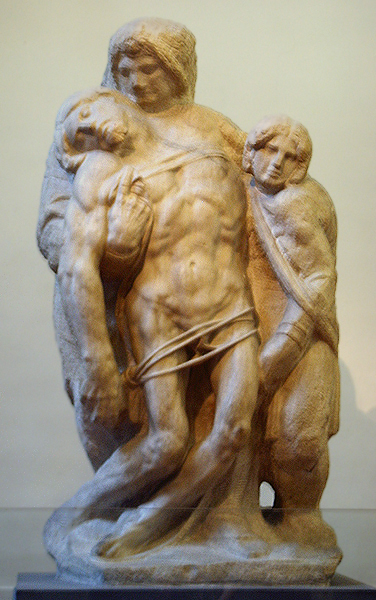
- Artist: Attributed to Michelangelo
- Year: c. 1555
- Type: Marble
- Dimensions: 253 cm (100 in)
- Location: Galleria dell'Accademia; Florence

The Palestrina Pietà is a marble sculpture of the Italian Renaissance, dating from c. 1555 and now in the Galleria dell'Accademia, Florence. It was formerly attributed to Michelangelo, but now it is mostly considered to have been completed by someone else, such as Niccolò Menghini or Gian Lorenzo Bernini. According to the Galleria dell'Accademia, the sculpture's "attribution to the master is still somehow controversial".

This Pietà depicts three figures, one of them the body of Jesus Christ. The sculpture was originally in a room beside the Santa Rosalia church in Palestrina and was owned by the Barberini family. Some sources indicate it was made in 1556. The sculpture was acquired by the government in 1939. The attribution to Michelangelo was made in the first half of the 18th century. There is no earlier discussion of the work as there is for nearly all others attributed to the master.

== See also ==
- List of statues of Jesus
- List of works by Michelangelo
