= Saint Matthew (Michelangelo) =

Sculpture by Michelangelo

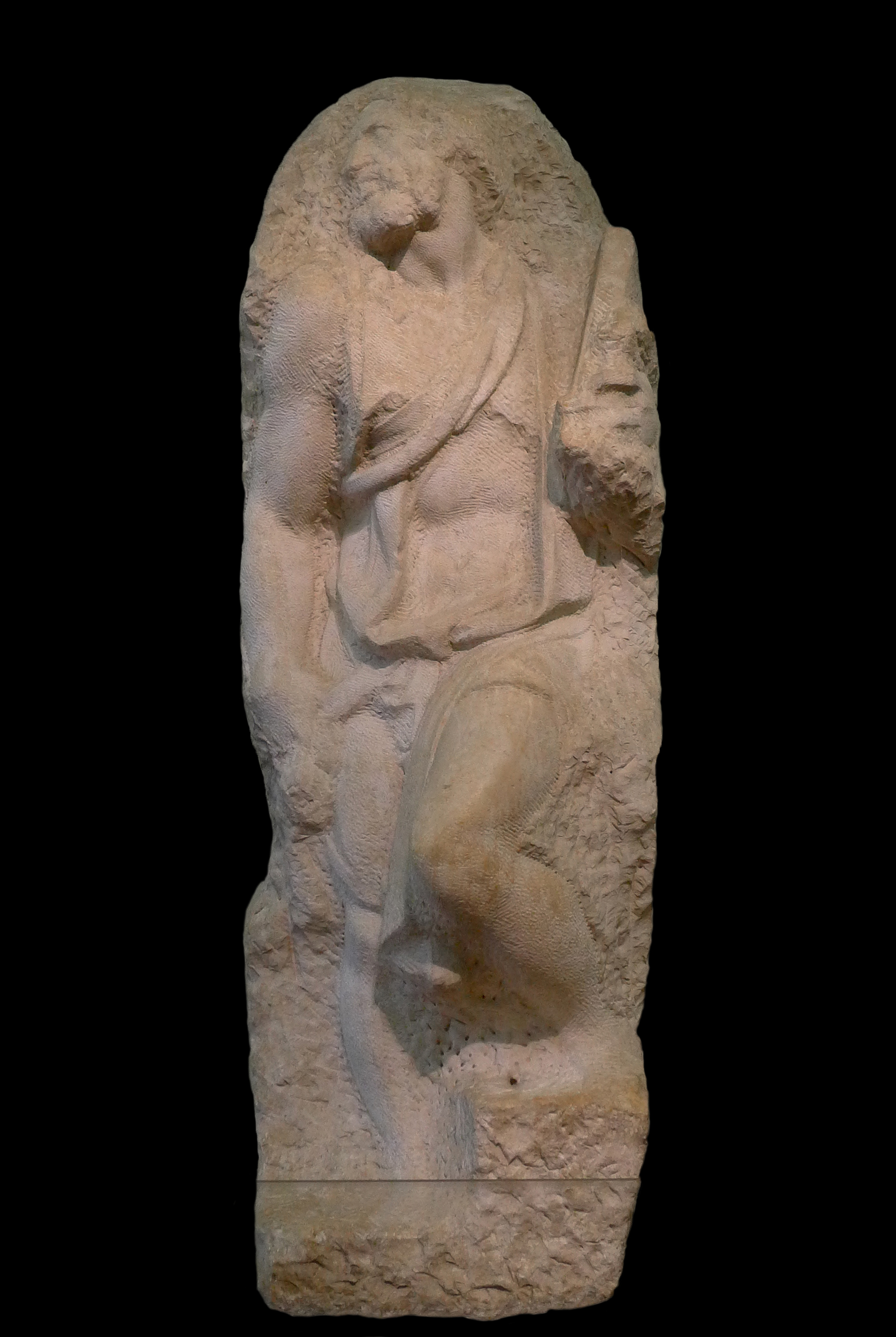
- Artist: Michelangelo
- Year: 1505–1506
- Medium: Marble
- Dimensions: 271 cm (107 in)
- Location: Galleria dell'Accademia; Florence

Saint Matthew is a marble sculpture of Matthew the Apostle by Michelangelo. It was intended for a series of twelve apostles for the choir niches of Florence Cathedral, but was left unfinished in 1506 when Michelangelo moved to Rome to work for Pope Julius II. It is currently part of the collection of the Galleria dell'Accademia in Florence.

== See also ==
- List of works by Michelangelo
