= Abduction of a Sabine Woman =

Marble statue by Giambologna

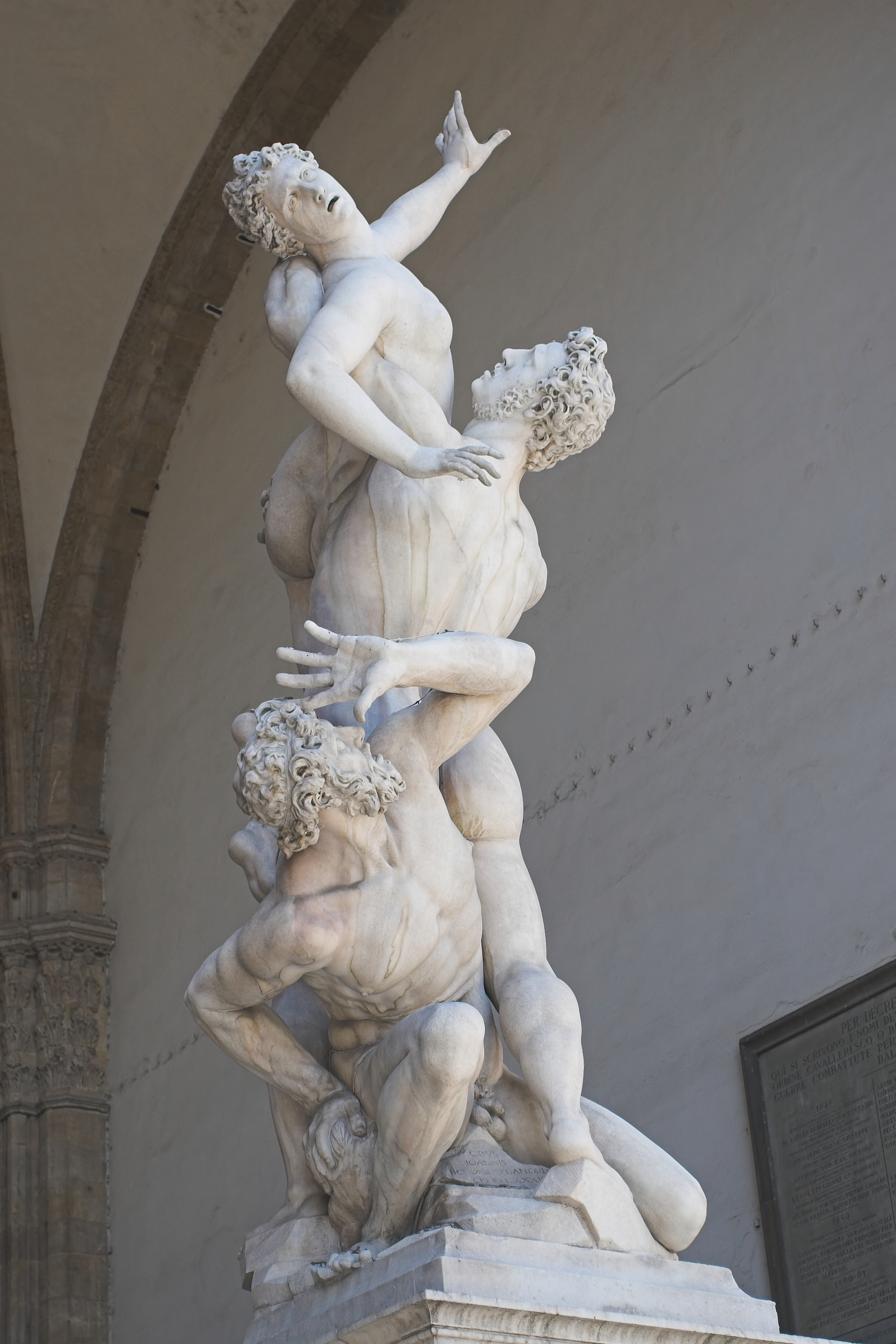
The Rape of the Sabines, 1579–1583. Height: 410 cm (13 ft 5 in). Loggia dei Lanzi, Florence

Abduction of a Sabine Woman (or The Rape (Note: This name is a "false friend" mistranslation of Latin: raptio, meaning kidnapping or abduction of a group) of the Sabine) is a large and complex marble statue by the Flemish sculptor and architect Giambologna (Johannes of Boulogne). It was completed between 1579 and 1583 for Francesco I de' Medici, Grand Duke of Tuscany. Giambologna achieved widespread fame in his lifetime, and this work is often considered his masterpiece. It has been in the Loggia dei Lanzi, Florence, since August 1582.

The statue is composed in the figura serpentinata style. It depicts three figures: a young man in the centre who has seemingly taken a woman from the despairing older man below him. It is ostensibly based on the "rape of the Sabine Women", a legend from the early history of Rome when the city contained relatively few women, leading to their men committing a raptio (large-scale abduction (Note: the word is rendered as rape in archaic or literary English due to mistranslation.)) of young women from nearby Sabina.

It was the first of Giambologna's statues for Francesco de’ Medici of Tuscany, and is produced in the Mannerist style associated with the Italian High Renaissance. It consists of three full figures and was carved from a single block of white marble. It was not given a title until after it was completed. Giambologna was typically non-committal about the subject matter of his work and in this instance, wanted to produce a large, monumental sculpture that would display his virtuosity. Between the time it was finished and Francesco had it installed at the Loggia dei Lanzi, Vincenzo Borghini suggested the title The Rape of the Sabines, and a bronze relief was added to the pedestal to link it to the Roman myth.

== Title and subject ==
The statue was made for Francesco I de' Medici, Grand Duke of Tuscany, not by commission, but rather to impress the influential Medici, for whom the artist later produced a number of works, thereby established his career and reputation.

Giambologna was more interested in technique and form than story-telling or history painting and typically named his works only late in their completion. His working titles for this statue included Paris and Helen, Pluto and Proserpina and Phineus and Andromeda, although the naming was not a matter he was preoccupied with. According to the art historian John Shearman, the statue was "an experiment in form rather than content", and typical of its time, "the expression of artistic qualities". The historian Charles Avery agreed with this, describing it as "purely as a compositional exercise". Avery went on to say that Giambologna's "lack of concern with specific subject matter or deep emotional expression...left him free to concentrate on the technical aspect, extending his virtuosity to the limits of the materials with which he worked."

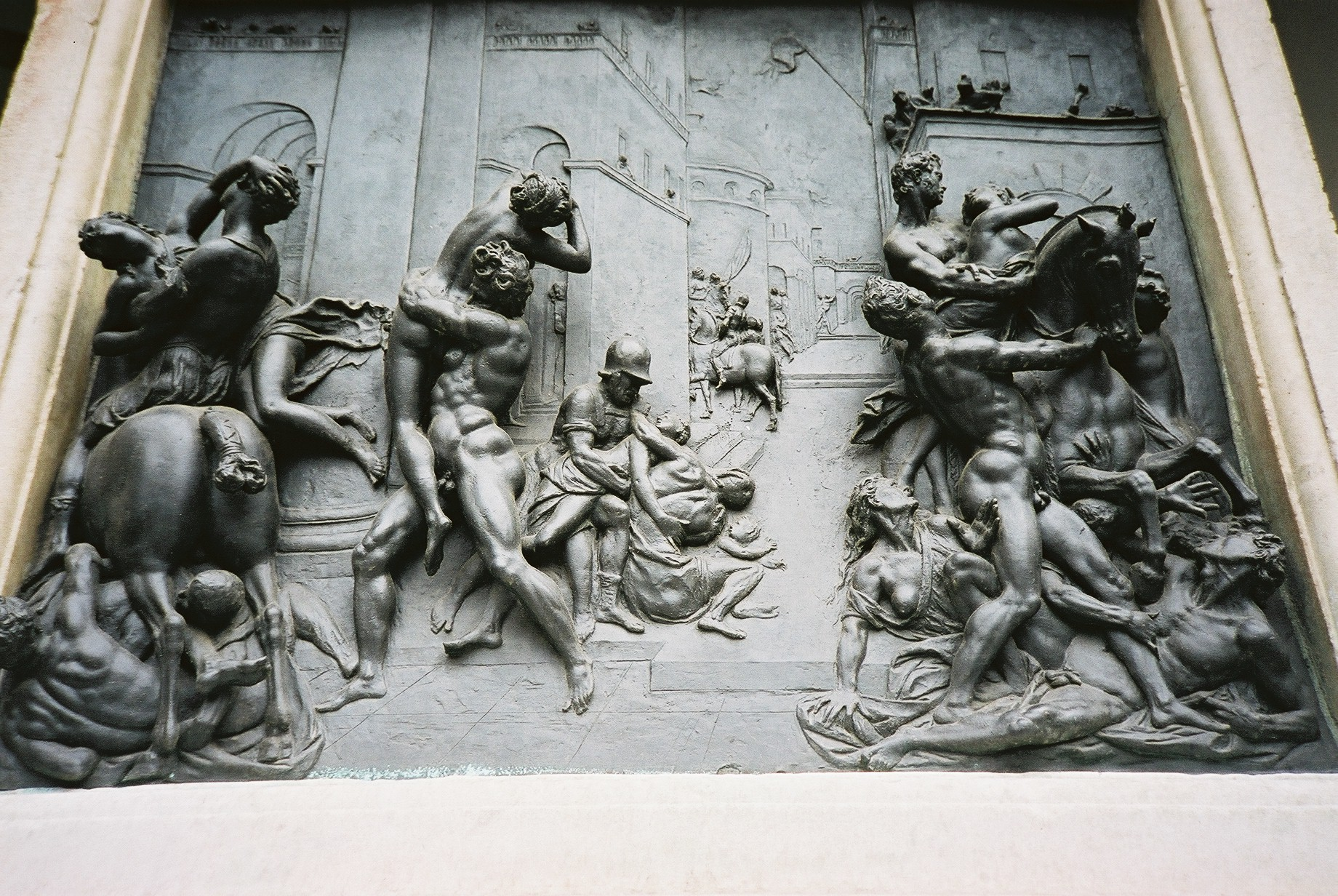
Detail of the bas (i.e. low or shallow)-relief on the pedestal. 74 cm x 89 cm

As its completion drew near, Giambologna was in need of a title and requested input from a number of writers. The Italian monk, philologist and art collector Vincenzo Borghini suggested the title La Rappia delle Sabine (The Plunder of the Sabine Maidens). According to the art historian Michael Cole, the title may fit in someway, but is essentially unsatisfactory or perhaps meaningless as it does not convey the artist's real intent. According to Cole "the scene...conforms with what one would expect in a depiction of the Sabines, but nothing there really clarifies the identities of the characters".

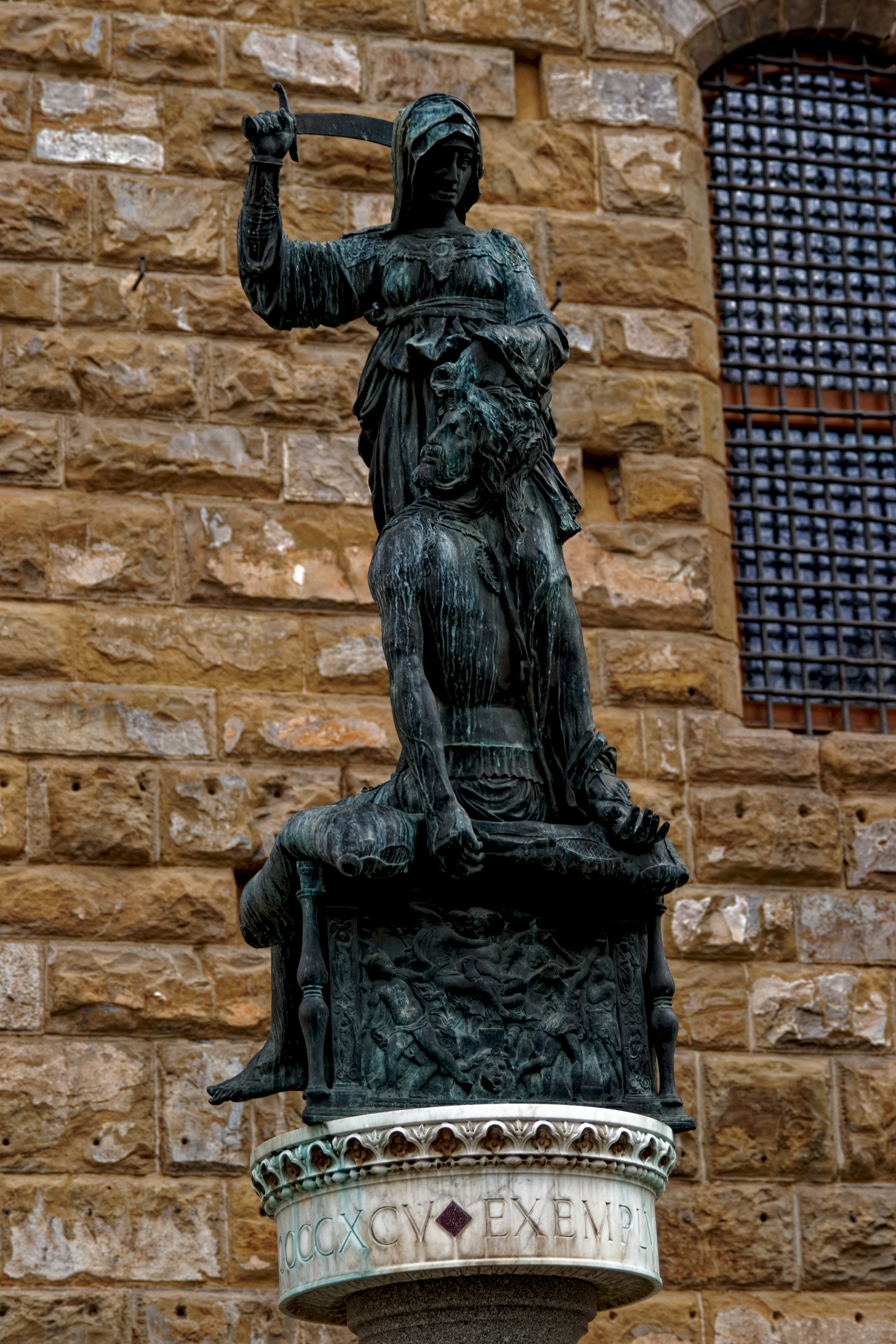
Donatello, Judith and Holofernes, c. 1455. Palazzo Vecchio, Florence

Borghini realised the contextual limitations of his title but nevertheless wrote that Giambologna "thus depicted the aforementioned Sabine maiden as the young woman who is being lifted up; her abductor represents Talassius. Even if he did not himself take her in public, his men took her for him, and he took her in private, stealing her virginity. And the old man below represents her father, since the story, as I have said, tells that the Romans robbed the Sabines from the arms of their father." On this reading the work is sometimes compared to Donatello's Judith and Holofernes, located at the Loggia dei Lanzi from 1506 to 1919.

In the context of the legend of the Sabine Women, the titular word 'rape' is based on the classical Roman term raptio, which roughly translates as "mass kidnap" rather than the modern English term, hence the recent trend of more accurately titling the work the abduction of a (singular) Sabine Woman.

== Description ==
The Abduction of a Sabine Woman was made from a single block of white marble, which became the largest block ever transported to Florence. Giambologna wanted to create a composition with the figura serpentina (S-curve) and an upward snakelike spiral movement. It was conceived without a dominant viewpoint; that is, the work gives a different view depending on which angle it is seen from.

At 410 cm in height, the statue is larger than life-sized, adding to its monumental impact. It depicts three nude figures: an old man crouching at the end, a young man in the center who lifts a young woman above his head. The woman, who reaches her right hand outwards grasping for help, is in a life-threatening struggle to free herself from her captor. The old man appears to be defeated and in despair. Only half of his body is visible and from some angles this is evidently because the younger man's feet and knees are violently pushing and keeping him down. The three figures' heads are at opposites regardless of view point; in particular the old man seems always turned away from the younger woman, as he realises he has lost her to the aggressor, and thus his facial contortions are probably to be read as from shame.

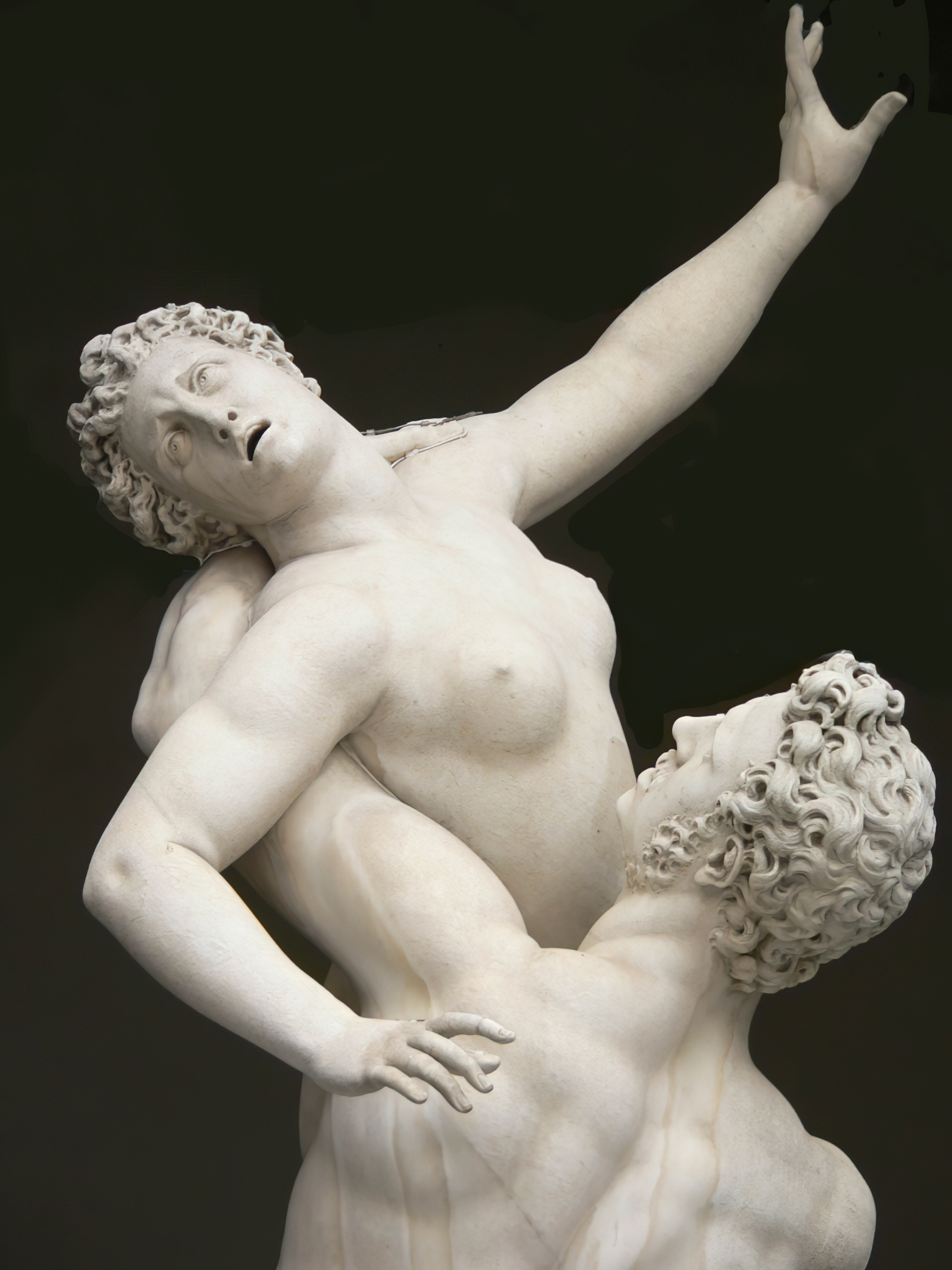
Detail of the female figure

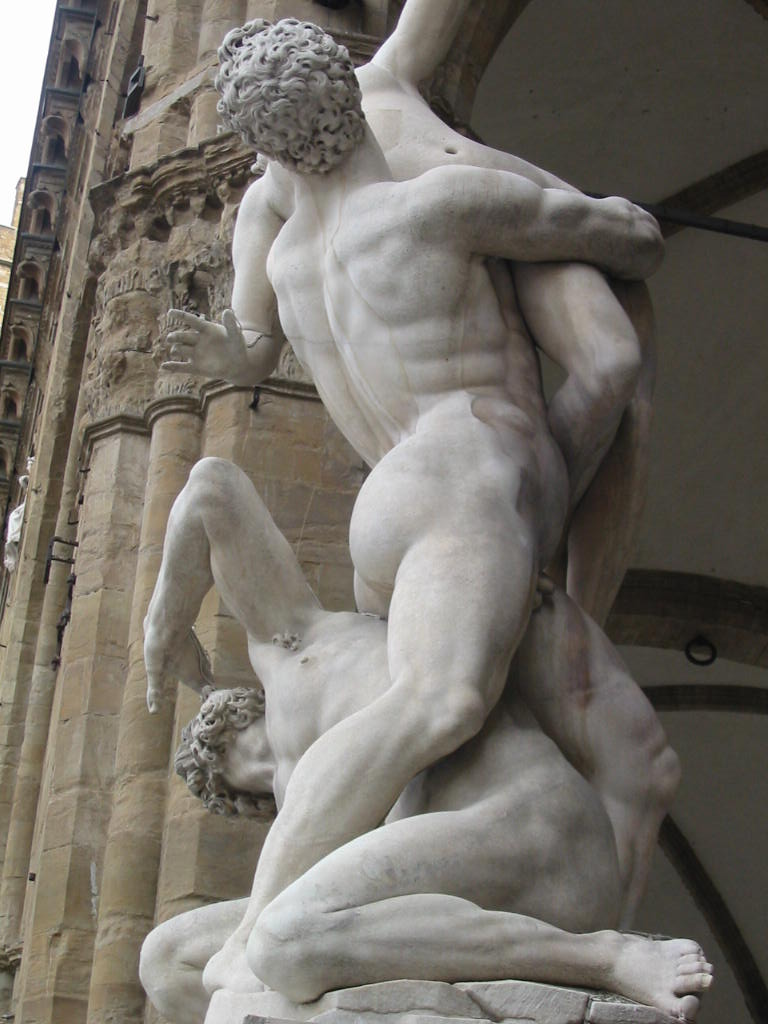
Rear view of the young man

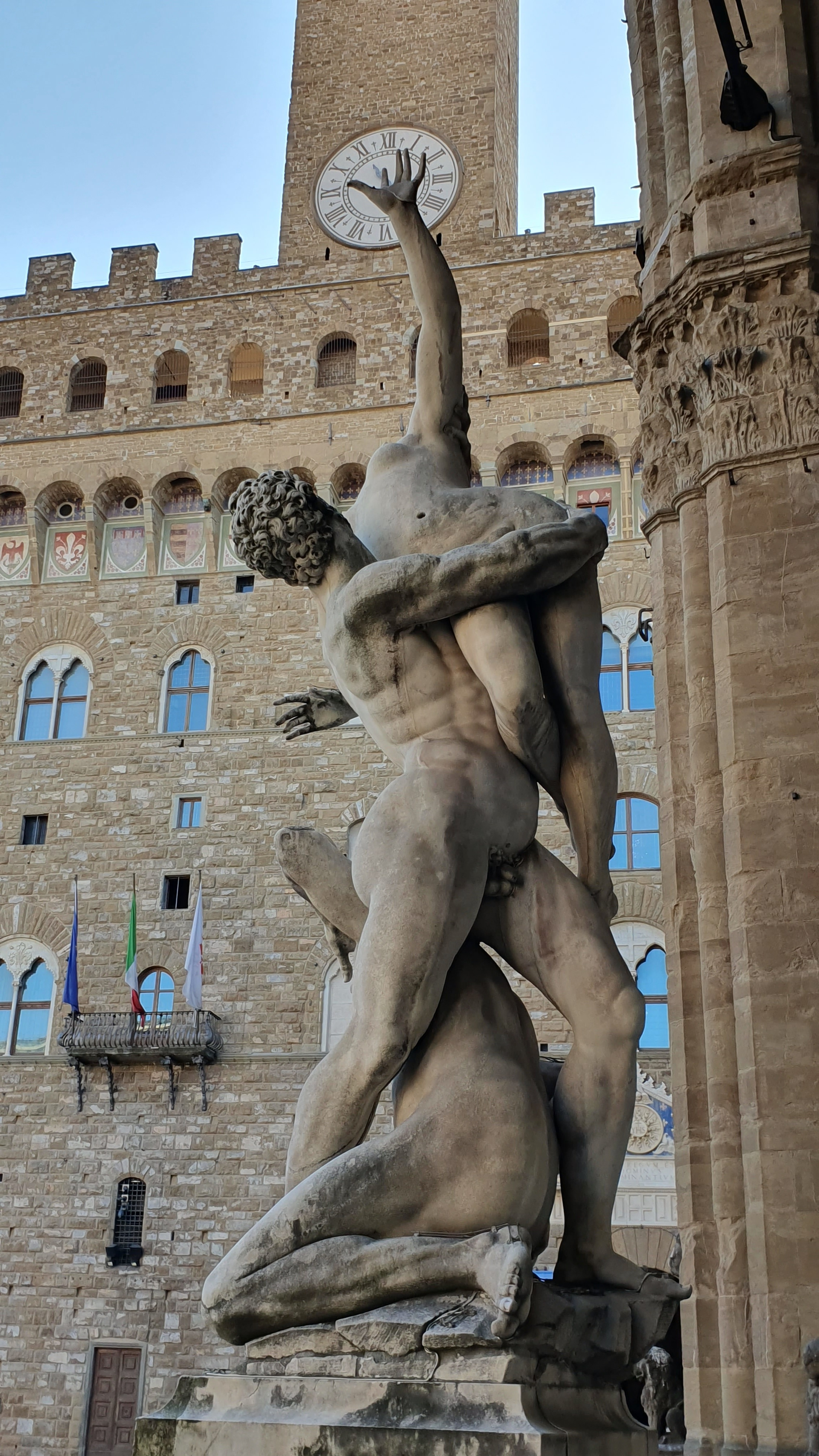
Frontal view with background

Giambologna was ambitious and competitive, and hoped to equal a number of his influences, including Michelangelo's 1501-04 David now in the Accademia Gallery, and Baccio Bandinelli's 1525-34 Hercules and Cacus at the Piazza della Signoria; both in Florence.

The pedestal contains a bas-relief inscription OPVS IOANNIS BOLONII FLANDRI MDLXXXII (The work of Johannes of Boulogne of Flanders, 1582).

== Studies, condition ==
The original plaster cast model is now in the Galleria dell'Accademia. A bronze model dated c. 1579 is in the Metropolitan Museum of Art, New York.

The sculpture was restored in 2001 and again in 2007.

== Influence ==
The statue was widely influential and is thought to have informed works such as The kidnapping of Proserpina by Gian Lorenzo Bernini (1621–22), Laocoon by Adriaen de Vries (1623) and Pierre Puget's Perseus and Andromeda (1684), among many others.

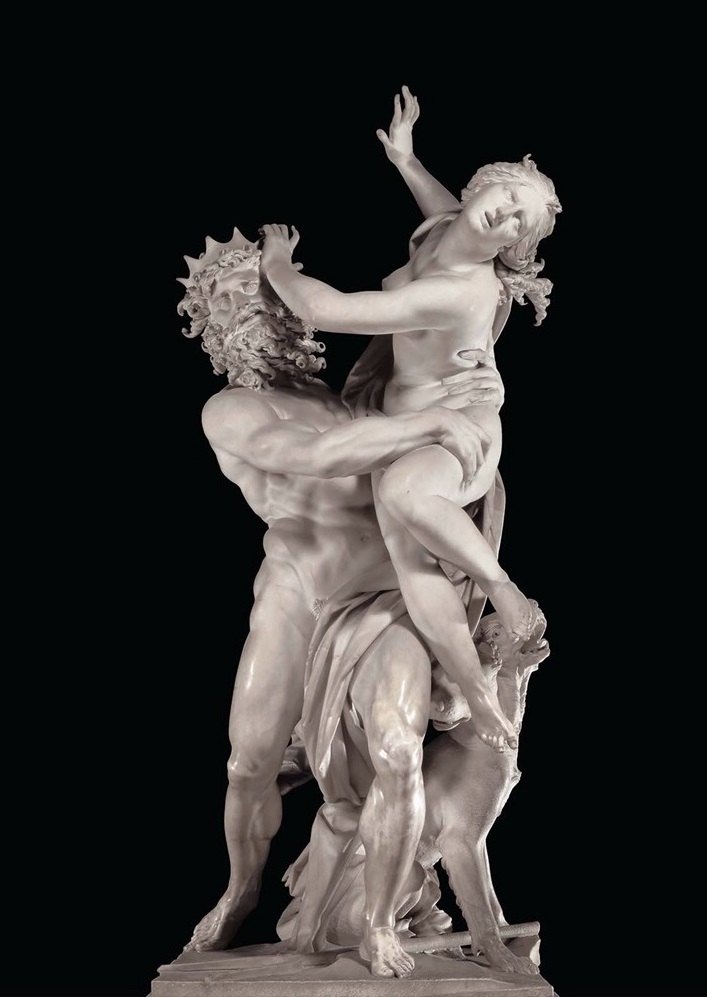
The kidnapping of Proserpina, Gian Lorenzo Bernini, 1621–22. Galleria Borghese, Rome

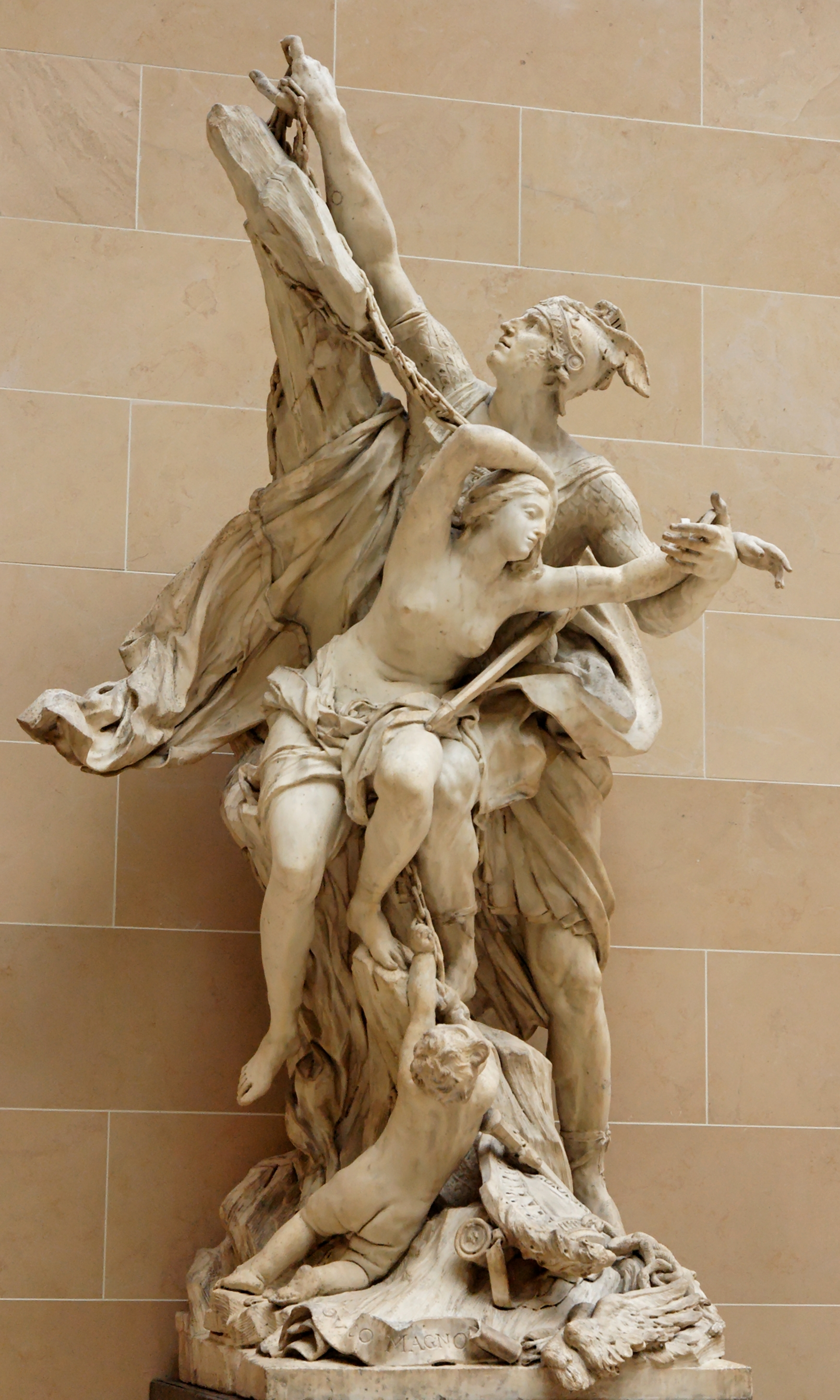
Perseus and Andromeda, Pierre Puget, 1684. Louvre, Paris
