= The Rape of Proserpina =

Sculpture by Gian Lorenzo Bernini

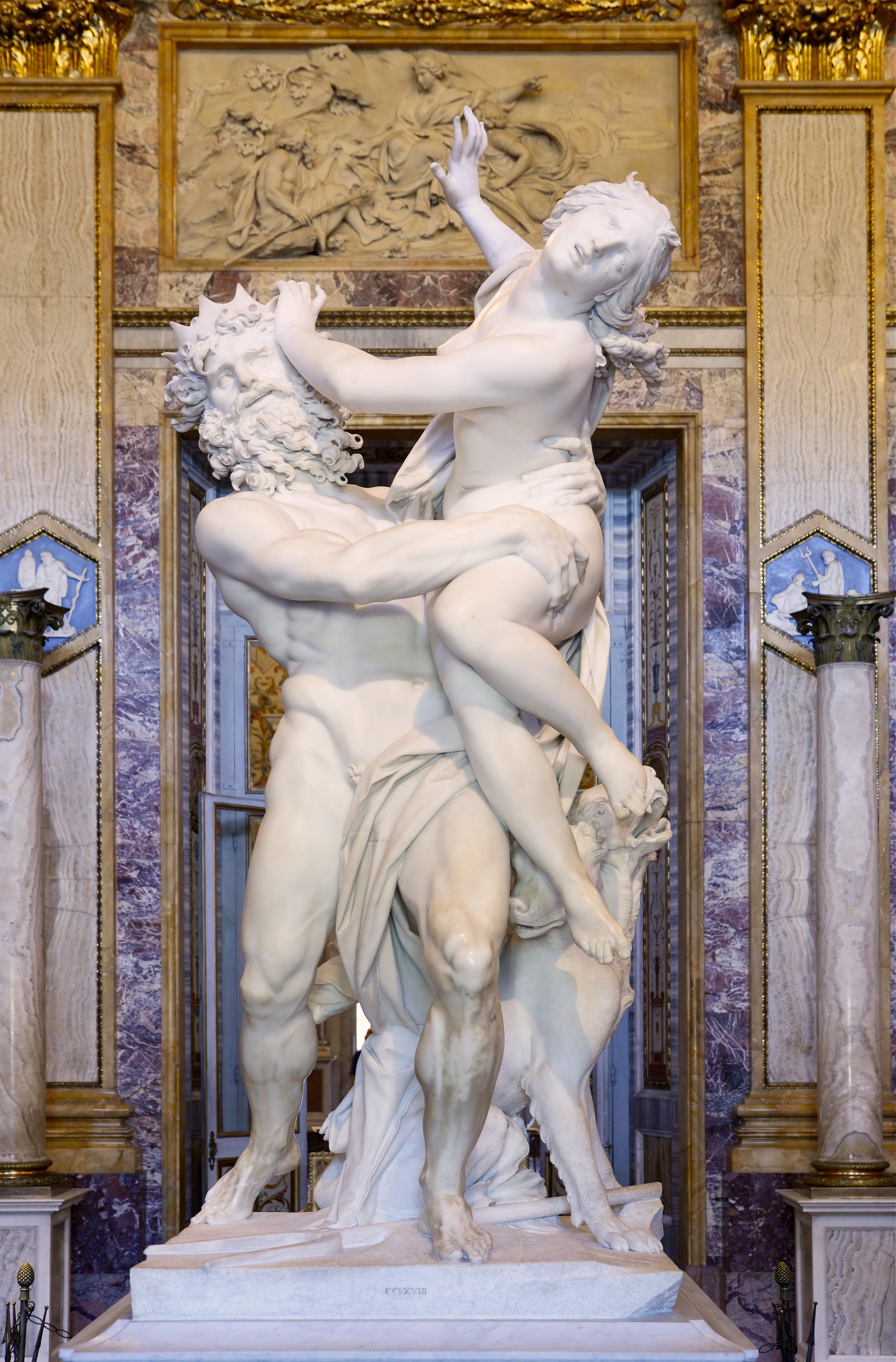
- Artist: Gian Lorenzo Bernini
- Year: 1621–22
- Catalogue: 10
- Type: Sculpture
- Medium: Carrara marble
- Dimensions: 225 cm (89 in)
- Location: Galleria Borghese, Rome; 41°54′50″N 12°29′31″E
- Preceded by: Neptune and Triton
- Followed by: Sleeping Hermaphroditus

The Rape of Proserpina (Italian: Ratto di Proserpina), more accurately translated as The Abduction of Proserpina, is a large Baroque marble group sculpture by Italian artist Gian Lorenzo Bernini, executed in 1621 and '22, when Bernini's career was in its early stage. The group, finished when Bernini was just 23 years old, depicts the abduction of Proserpina, who is seized and taken to the underworld by the god Pluto. It features Pluto holding Proserpina aloft, and a Cerberus to symbolize the border into the underworld that Pluto carries Proserpina into.

Cardinal Scipione Borghese commissioned the sculpture and gave it to the newly appointed Cardinal-nephew, Ludovico Ludovisi, possibly as a means of gaining favour. The choice to depict the myth of Proserpina may relate to the recent death of Pope Paul V, or to the recent empowerment of Ludovico. Bernini drew inspiration from Giambologna and Annibale Carracci for the sculpture, which is the only work for which preparatory material survives. The Rape of Proserpina is made of rare Carrara marble, and was originally placed on a pedestal, since destroyed, with a poem by Maffeo Barberini. It has been praised for its realism, as the marble mimics other materials like flesh. The detail is notable; for instance, a trickle of tears contributes to the expressiveness of Proserpina's face.

== Background ==
The Rape of Proserpina is based on the myth of Proserpina's abduction, which is found in both Ovid's Metamorphoses and Claudian's De Raptu Proserpinae. Proserpina, the daughter of Jupiter and Ceres, the Roman goddess of agriculture, is gathering flowers when she is seized by the god of the underworld, Pluto. Pluto erupts from the ground in a chariot pulled by four black horses, and forces Proserpina down into the underworld with him, but not before Ceres could hear her daughter scream. Ceres dried the earth and caused harvests to fail, prompting Jupiter to negotiate a deal: Pluto and Ceres would each have Proserpina for half the year. The myth symbolizes the changing of the seasons: when Proserpina is with Pluto, nature dies and winter begins; when she resides with Ceres, the Earth is in spring.

Bernini's statue depicts the climactic moment of the story, when Pluto grabs Proserpina, who struggles against him as he carries her over the border of the underworld, symbolized by a marble Cerberus. The combatants are almost fully nude, though cloth still covers Pluto's thigh and Proserpina's shoulder. The marble Cerberus is joined to Pluto through this cloth.

Many sculptures of the time did not have one central perspective from which to view them, instead forcing the observer to see them from many angles before they could understand it in its entirety. The Rape of Proserpina, however, can be seen in full from one angle, directly in front of the base. All other viewpoints are subordinate.

== History ==
=== Patronage ===
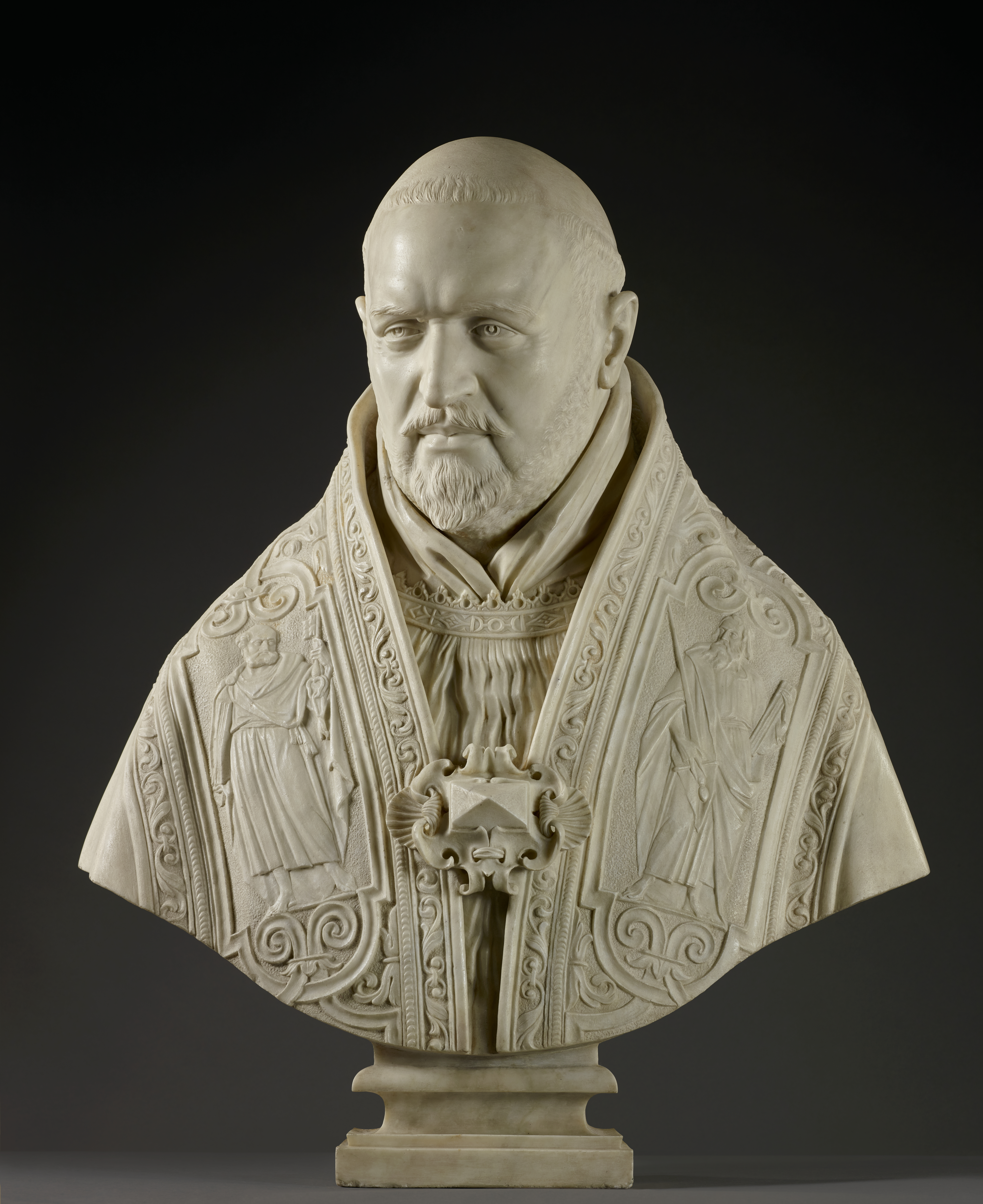
Bust of Pope Paul V in the Galleria Borghese

As with many of Bernini's early works, the Rape of Proserpina was commissioned by Cardinal Scipione Borghese, alongside a bust in memory of Scipione's uncle, Pope Paul V, who died in January 1621. The sculpture, the first in a series of major Borghese works including the David and the Apollo and Daphne, was finished in 1622 and delivered to the Villa Borghese, whose main facade already had the myth of Proserpina depicted. Bernini received at least three payments for its creation, of the value of at least 450 Roman scudi. Ultimately, the statue was gifted to Cardinal-nephew Ludovico Ludovisi and sent to his villa in the summer of 1623.

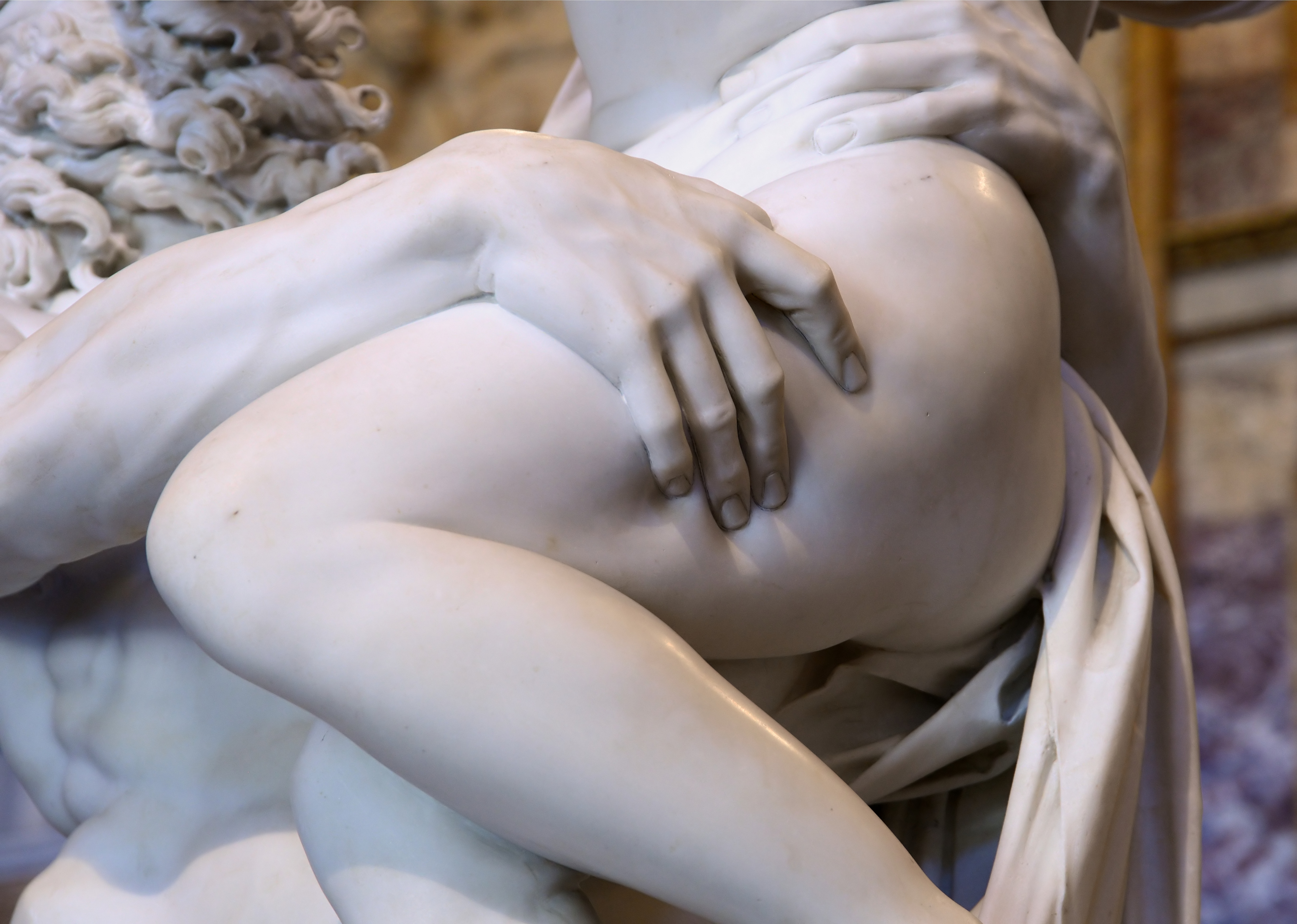
Detail of Proserpina's thigh

It is unclear why Scipione gifted the sculpture to Ludovico, a political rival, though it may have been an attempt to curry favour with the Ludovisis after the death of the Borghese pope and the ascension of Alessandro Ludovisi to the papacy. Alternatively, the sculpture was explicit payment for a political favour done for Scipione. In either case, Scipione was disliked by the Ludovisis due to his pocketing of revenue from Pope Ludovisi's archbishopric of Bologna. Furthermore, the Ludovisi's family ally, the Aldobrandinis, had been treated badly during the Borghese papacy and were demanding revenge. The same month that Scipione delivered the Rape of Proserpina to Villa Ludovisi, a judge and close ally of Borghese was imprisoned; the statue therefore may have been tribute to the now-powerful Ludovisi family. Regardless, the Apollo and Daphne likely replaced the Rape of Proserpina, or at least let Scipione believe he could afford to give away the first statue.

Given how closely affiliated Borghese was with the Church, it could be somewhat puzzling to a casual observer why he chose to commission art depicting pagan mythology; however, statues of this sort were created to display knowledge and culture, and often had a small insignia from the Pope explaining how Christian morals could be drawn from such pagan scenes. Additionally, the myth of Proserpina—while technically symbolizing the annual renewal of nature—was linked by Catholics to the death and resurrection of Christ. Matthias Winner suggests that Borghese commissioned a statue related to rebirth in hopes of a resurrection of the recently deceased Pope Borghese. Christina Strunck, however, argues that the statue was created as an insult to the Ludovisis; interpreting the myth as the death of vegetation may be a slight at the start of the new, Ludovisi era, and Proserpina's capture may be a warning that the notoriously unhealthy Pope Ludovisi would not live long.

=== Inspiration ===
Bernini had access to a great deal of works from his time. His connections to Maffeo Barberini and Scipione Borghese in the early part of his career granted him access to the Vatican archives. Combined with Bernini's daily visits to the Vatican's collections as a child, and his tutelage under his father, Pietro Bernini, Gian Lorenzo would have had a great deal of sources of inspiration to draw from.

Bernini may have been inspired by Pietro da Barga's mediocre bronze Pluto and Proserpina, which features a Pluto holding a Proserpina parallel to himself and aloft, as well as a Cerberus at his feet. It was likely an attempted reconstructing of Praxiteles' bronze Rape of Proserpina, which has since been lost but was discussed in Pliny's Natural History. The same work discusses a lost bronze Bacchus statue from Praxiteles, which Michelangelo later reconstructed in marble. Therefore, despite the work's apparent poor quality, Bernini may have been following Michelangelo's lead and attempting to reproduce Praxiteles.

The elevated position of Proserpina is reminiscent of both Giambologna's Abduction of a Sabine Woman and his Hercules and Antaeus. In the Abduction of the Sabine woman, the victim is held aloft as she flings her arms out and looks away in despair. Similarly, in the other sculpture, Hercules lifts Antaeus up as Antaeus pushes violently against his head. Both sculptures are similar to how Proserpina attempts to escape Pluto's grasp, but the Abduction of a Sabine Woman is intended to be viewed from many angles, a key difference from the Rape of Proserpina, which has one predominant perspective.

Annibale Carracci, a mentor of Bernini, was influential to the form and facial structure of Pluto and Proserpina. Characters in the Farnese ceiling have comparable anatomy to Proserpina's voluptuous body and her abductor's musculature. Likewise, Pluto's visage is closely related to Carracci's Jupiter, and both the form and facial structure of Proserpina recall Carracci's Andromeda as she flings herself away from Pluto and looks desperately for help. Even Cerberus finds analogue to Paris' dog in the Farnese ceiling. Beyond Carracci, the expression of Proserpina resembles the Laocoön (which Bernini had previously restored), and her form mirrors the Niobides. Lastly, Pluto's wide stance and the usage of a buttress bear resemblance to the Borghese Gladiator, which had recently been purchased by Scipione.

=== Creation ===
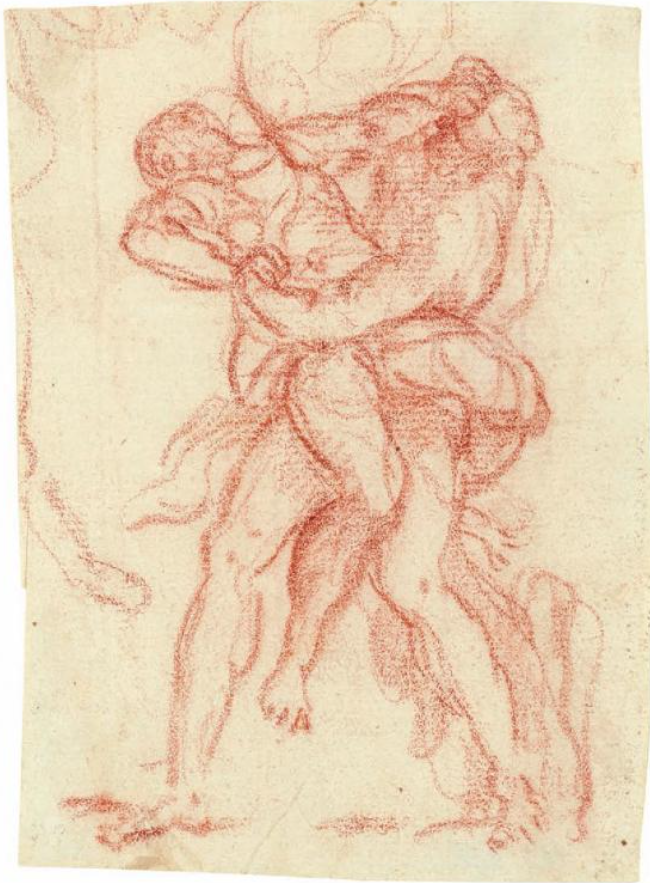
Early sketch of the Rape of Proserpina

Of all the Bernini works commissioned by Borghese, the only known preparatory material (and Bernini's earliest datable drawing) is a sketch of the Rape of Proserpina. In Bernini's sculpture, Pluto and Proserpina are nearly parallel, but in the drawing, Proserpina forms a diagonal across Pluto's body; additionally, the sketch lacks a Cerberus, though there is a vague object at Pluto's leg. And in the drawing, Proserpina's right arm does not lift upwards.

Additionally, a fragment study of the head of Proserpina resides in the Cleveland Museum of Art. Small particles embedded in the surface of the terracotta suggest that a larger clay study existed but was used to make a plaster cast, destroying all but the head. The remaining piece was then fired into terracotta. The fragment, which is nearly identical to the head of the finished sculpture, was long thought to be a preparatory work by Bernini, but scrape marks uncharacteristic of Bernini suggest that it was instead made by a family member. The Head of Proserpina was bought from the Palazzo Bernini by Busiri Vici in 1839, and sold again to the Cleveland Museum of Art in 1968.

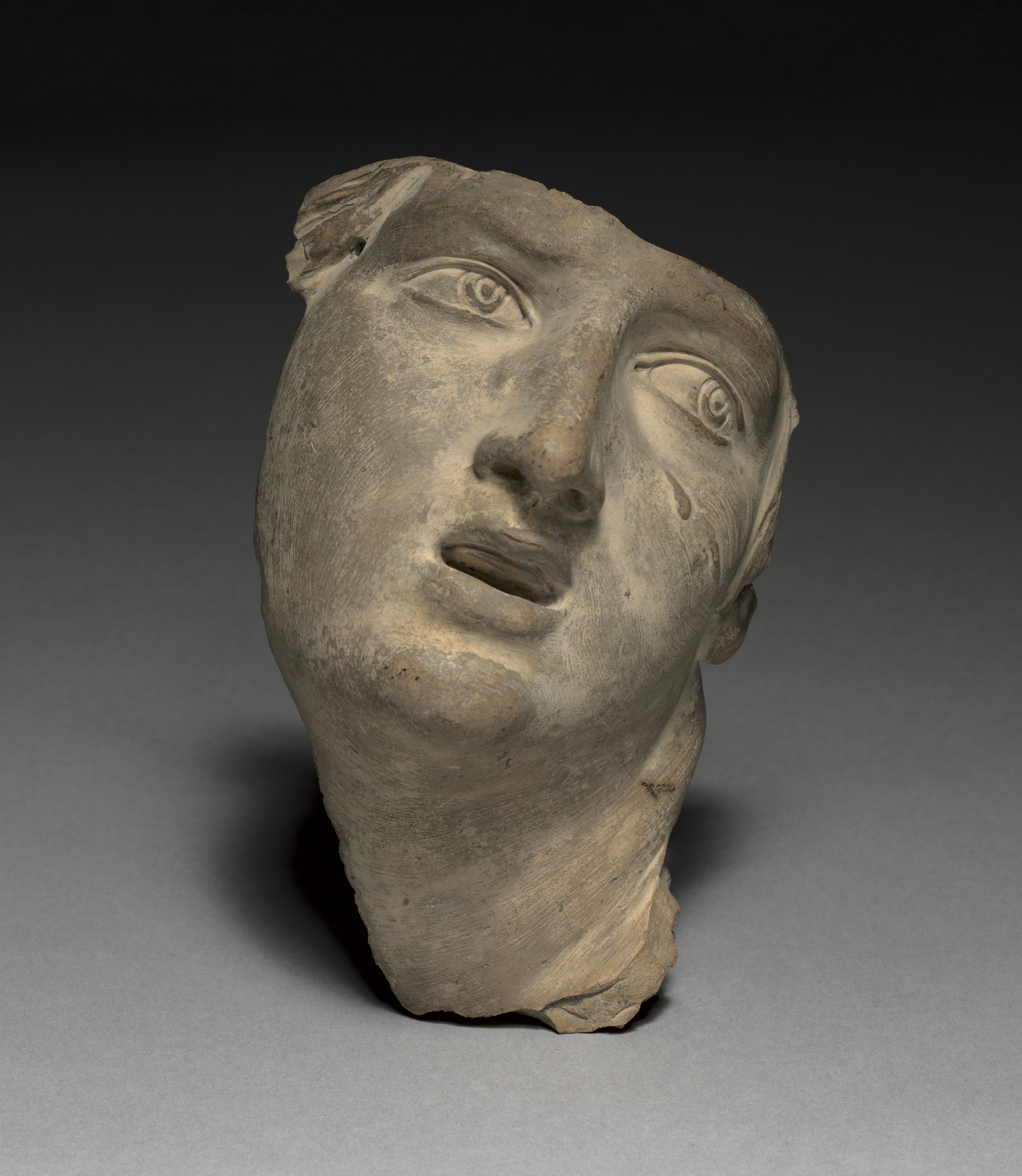
Head of Proserpina, Cleveland Museum of Art

The Rape of Proserpina is made of high-quality Carrara marble, which was hard to find in large blocks and highly coveted by 17th-century sculptors. Marble is a very heavy material, but Proserpina is held aloft with apparent ease, and her arm stretches out away from the rest of the group. Given that the original sketch had no Cerberus, it's possible that the dog was added only when Bernini realized he needed a buttress to support the rest of the sculpture. This helps Bernini achieve a weightlessness akin to flesh. Furthermore, Bernini uses different tools to render the illusion of differing materials. He formulates the softness of flesh with abrasives, foliage with a chisel, and fabric with a rasp.

The sculpture was placed against a wall, upon a now-destroyed pedestal with a poem by Maffeo Barberini inscribed upon it: "Oh you who are bending down to gather flowers, \ behold as I am abducted to the home of the cruel Dis." The inscription, originally created between 1618 and 1620, is Proserpina's anguished warning to others collecting flowers. As flowers are not depicted in the statue, despite being explicitly mentioned in the poem, it's unlikely the poem inspired the commission.

=== Later history ===
In 1750, The Rape of Proserpina was moved to the Palazzo Grande, but in the 19th century, the sculpture had returned to the Villa Ludovisi. Between 1890 and 1895, a part of the villa was destroyed, and the sculpture was placed at the foot of the grand staircase of the Palazzo Piombino. Finally, in 1908, the sculpture was bought by the Italian government and returned to the Galleria Borghese, where it was placed in the centre of the Salone degli Imperatori, a room in the museum. The original pedestal, at one point destroyed, has been replaced by a simple white marble base sculpted in 1911 by Pietro Fortunati. During the First World War, the sculpture was protected by a box and sandbags to prevent damage.

== Critical reaction ==
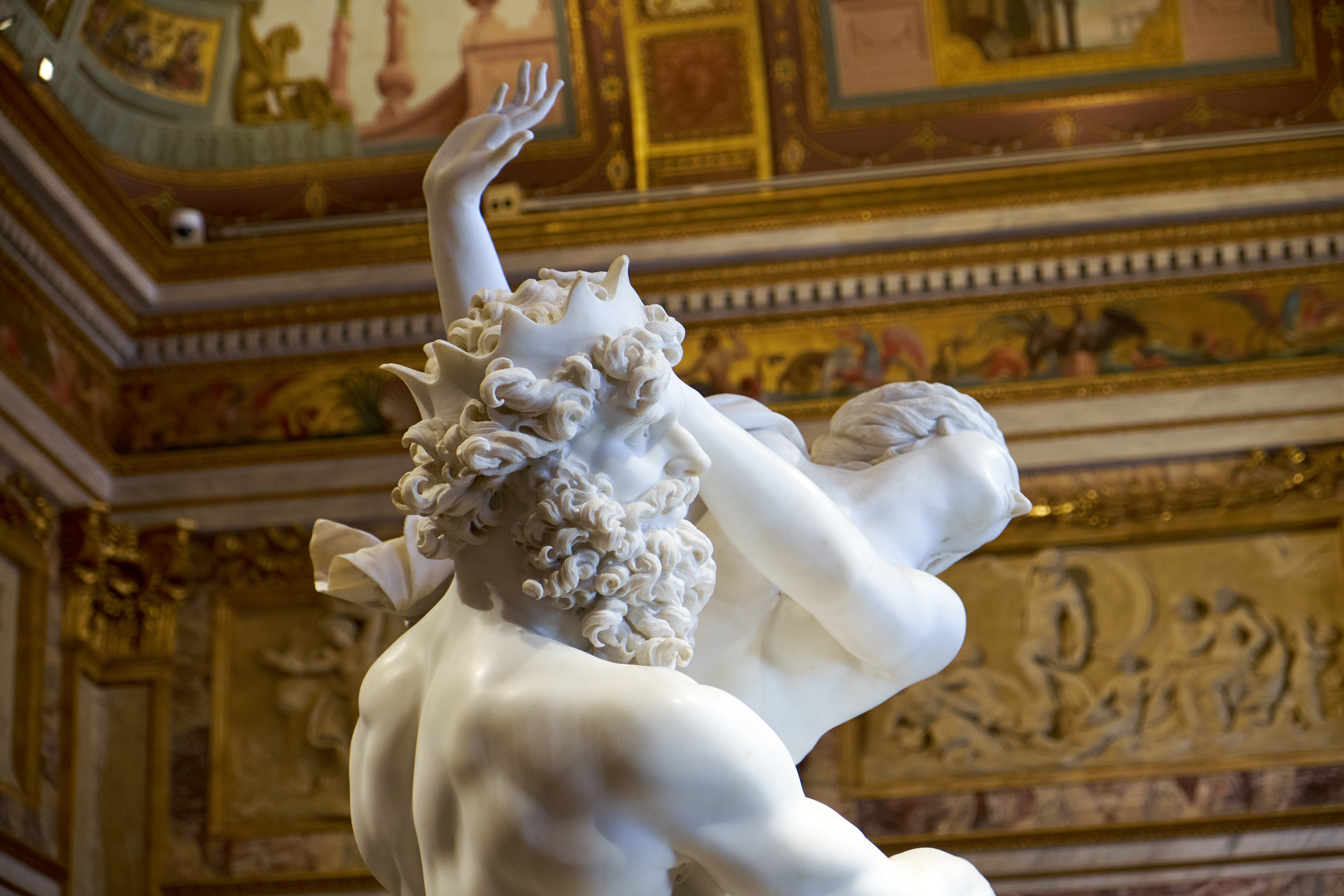
Detail of Pluto's hair and beard

Most critics have been quick to praise the work. Rudolf Wittkower noted: "representations of such rape scenes depended on Bernini's new, dynamic conception for the next hundred and fifty years". Howard Hibbard makes similar comments noting the realistic effects that Bernini had achieved via carving hard marble, such as the "texture of the skin, the flying ropes of hair, the tears of Persephone and above all the yielding flesh of the girl". The choice of incident to depict the story is commonly cited as well: Pluto's hands encircle the waist of Proserpina just as she throws her arms out in an attempt to escape. Bernini's own son and biographer, Domenico, called it "an amazing contrast of tenderness and cruelty".

However, in the eighteenth and nineteenth centuries, when Bernini's reputation was at a low ebb, critics found fault with the statue. The eighteenth-century French visitor Jerome de la Lande allegedly wrote: "Pluto's back is broken; his figure extravagant, without character, nobleness of expression, and its outline bad; the female one no better". Another French visitor to the Villa Ludovisi was equally critical, stating: "The head of Pluto is vulgarly gay; his crown and beard give him a ridiculous air, while the muscles are strongly marked and the figure poses. It is not a true divinity, but a decorative god..."

Others have remarked on the twisted contrapposto or figura serpentinata pose of the group. While reminiscent of Mannerism, particularly Giambologna's Abduction of a Sabine Woman, Bernini permits the viewer to absorb the scene from one single viewpoint. While other views provide further details, a spectator can see the desperation of Proserpina and the lumbering attempts of Pluto to grab her. This was in contrast to the Mannerist sculpture of Giambologna, which required the spectator to walk around the sculpture to gain a view of each character's expression.

== Related works ==
- A fragment study of Proserpina's head, long thought to be by Bernini but probably created by a related artist, is in the Cleveland Museum of Art.
- In 1811, the Russian sculptor Vasily Demut-Malinovsky created a sculpture also titled The Abduction of Proserpina. The statue currently resides in Saint-Petersburg.
- Jeff Koons's Pluto and Proserpina is an 11-foot-tall stainless steel sculpture with transparent colour coating and live flowering plants. Argentine developer and art collector Eduardo Costantini purchased it to place in the breezeway at his luxury oceanfront condo in Bal Harbour, Florida, which was slated for completion in 2016.

== See also ==
- List of works by Gian Lorenzo Bernini
