= Figura serpentinata =

Italian artistic style

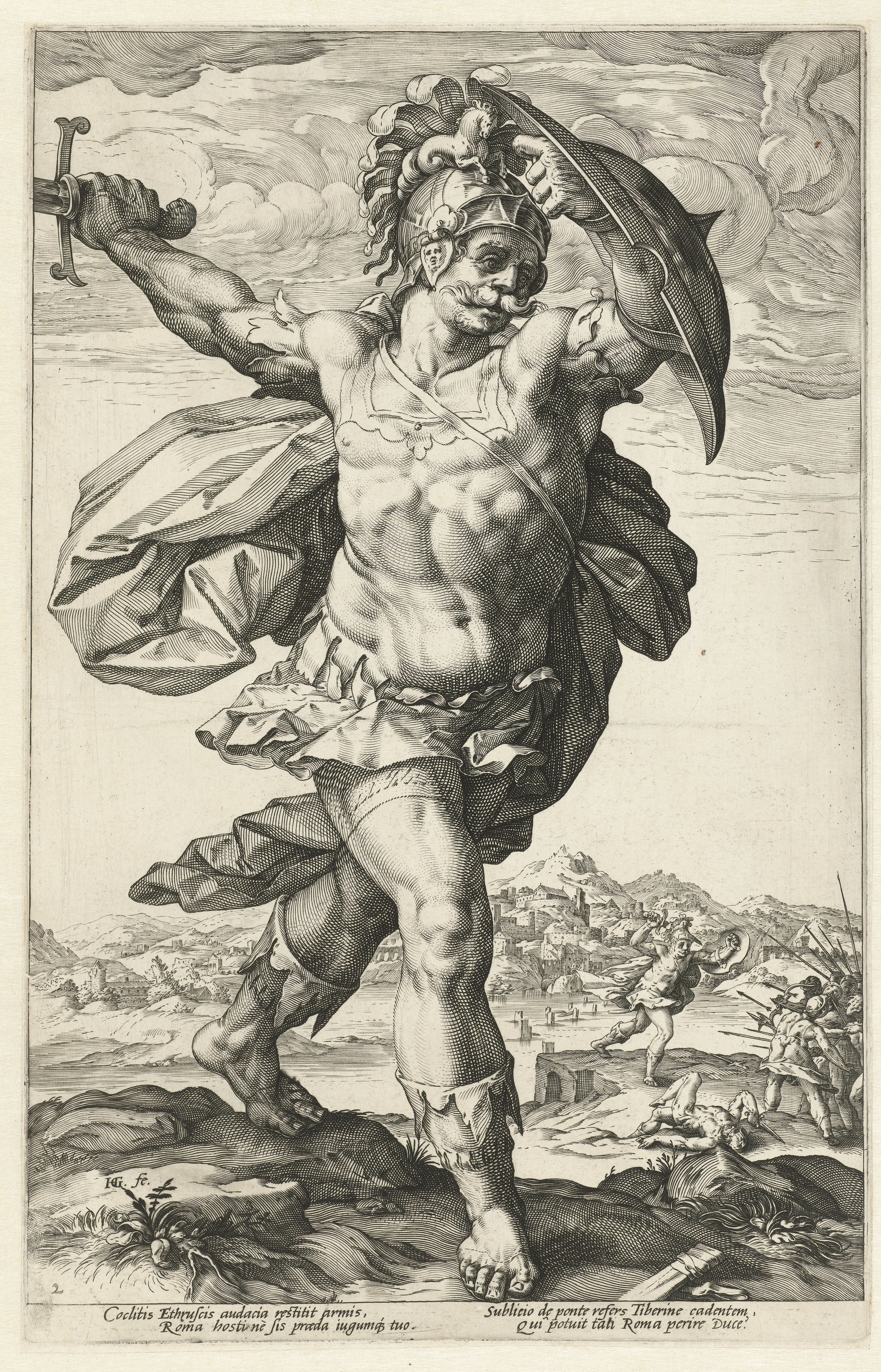
Horatius Cocles, engraving by Hendrick Goltzius – an example of a Figura serpentinata

Figura serpentinata (lit. 'serpentine figure') is a style in painting and sculpture, intended to make the figure seem more dynamic, that is typical of Mannerism. It is similar, but not identical, to contrapposto, and features figures often in a spiral pose. Early examples can be seen in the work of Leonardo da Vinci, Raphael and Michelangelo.

Emil Maurer writes of the painter and theorist Gian Paolo Lomazzo (1538–1600): "The recommended ideal form unites, after Lomazzo, three qualities: the pyramid, the serpentinata movement and a certain numerical proportion, all three united to form one whole. At the same time, precedence is given to the "moto", that is, to the meandering movement, which should make the pyramid, in exact proportion, into the geometrical form of a cone."

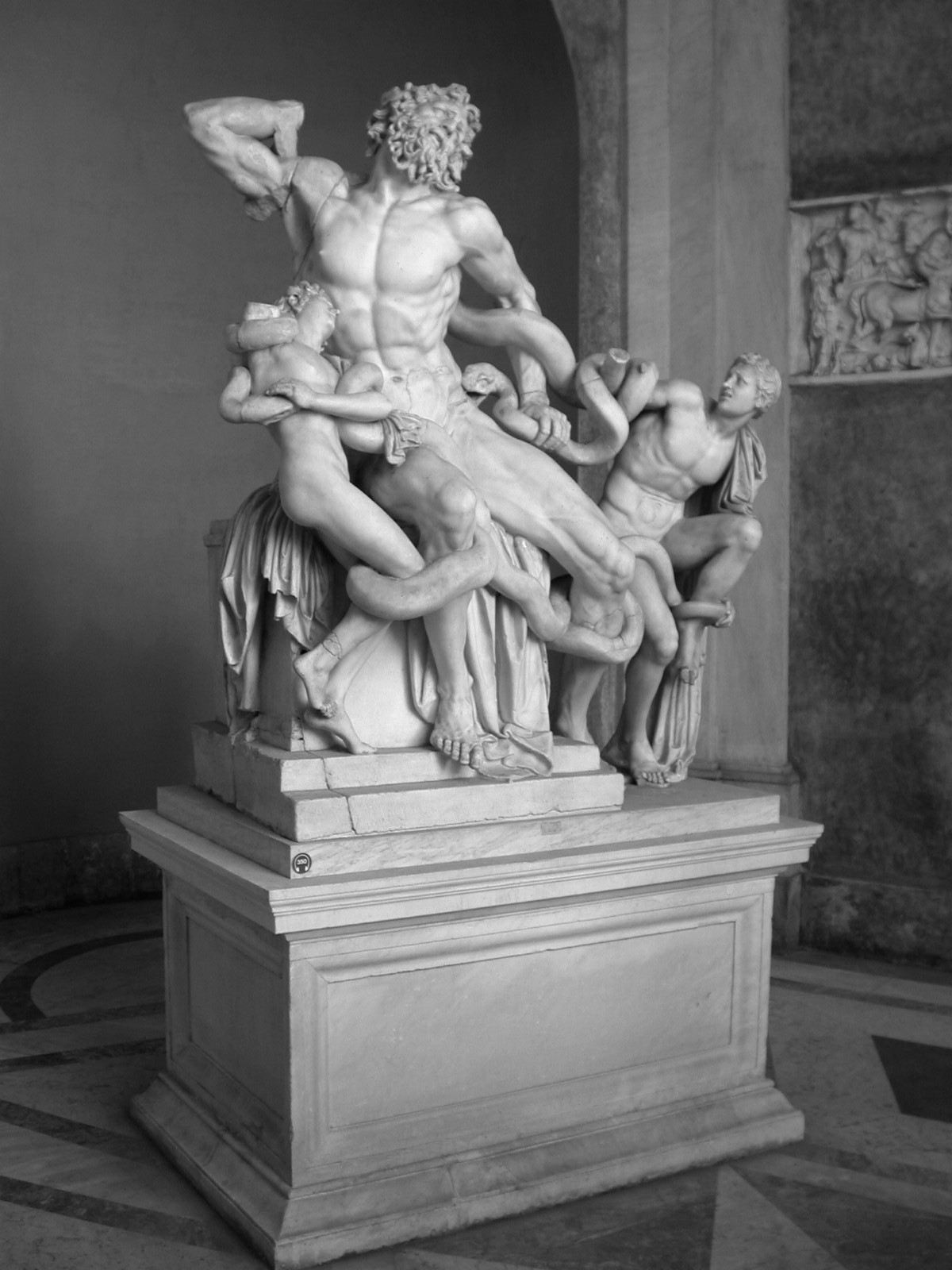
The Laocoön group

Bousquet holds that the serpentinata style arose as a result of the discovery of the Laocoön group in 1506, and its deep impact on all artists, but on Michelangelo in particular. John Shearman also argues that it was invented by Michelangelo, citing the "Victors" that he produced for Pope Julius II's tomb. Maurer, on the other hand, can only detect this style rarely in Michelangelo's work and cites Beccafumi instead as its pioneer. Beccafumi's student Marco Pino connected Beccafumi's style with those of Salviati, Parmigianino and perhaps even Michelangelo, and his work as a whole is marked by serpentinata motifs. Paolo Pino himself says in his Dialogo della Pittura, that his figures' poses are many and varied, and that in all his works to find one single figure, that completely and utterly distorts, is ambivalent and difficult.

As Maurer writes, painters are freer than sculptors and less closely tied-down to nature. Thus, they can play around with their figures, reshaping, overstretching, geometricising, dissolving, caricaturing, colouring, or meandering according to the painting's goal and intended effect. With the loosening of the norms of the Renaissance art and the development of the "serpentita" style, that style's structures and rules began to be systematised. A style of form began by which figures showed physical power, passion, tension and semantic perfection. Movements were not without motivation, nor even simply done with a will, but with will shown in a pure form . Also their actions arose not out of power, but powerlessness.

The style exerted an influence even into the 1620s, with Bernini's The Rape of Proserpina.

== Bibliography ==
- (in German) Emil Maurer: Manierismus: Figura serpentinata und andere Figurenideale: Studien, Essays, Berichte, 2001. ISBN 3-85823-791-4.
- John Shearman: Mannerism. Art and Architecture series. London: Penguin Books, 1991. ISBN 0-14-013759-9.
- Jacques Bousquet: Mannerism: The Painting and Style of the Late Renaissance, New York, 1964, translated by Simon Watson Taylor.
