= Galleria dell'Accademia =

Galleria dell'Accademia di Firenze
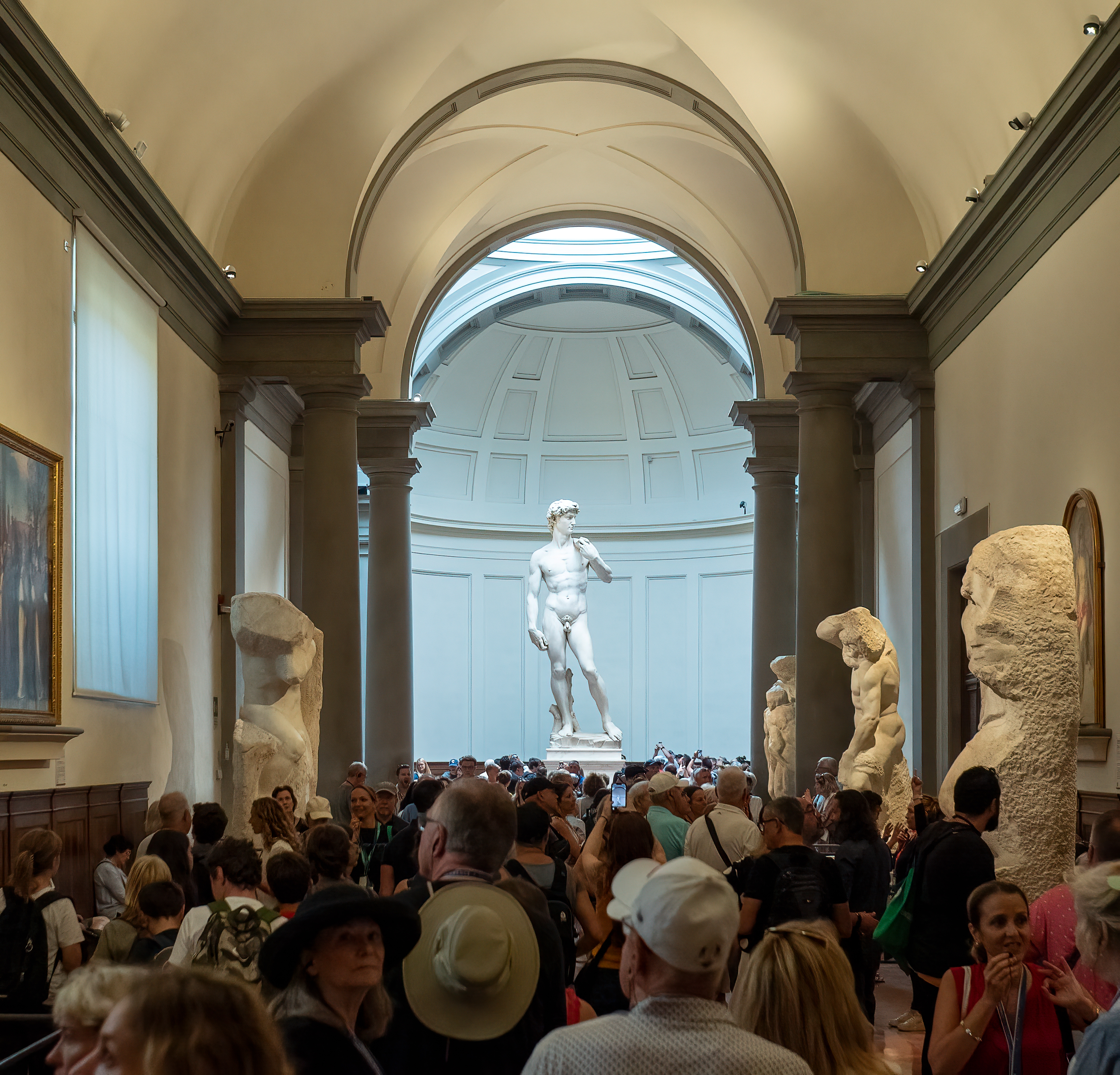
- Interior of the gallery, with Michelangelo's David visible in the centre
- Established: 1784
- Location: 58–60 via Ricasoli, 50122 Florence, Italy
- Coordinates: 43°46′37″N 11°15′32″E
- Type: art museum
- Website: www.galleriaaccademiafirenze.it/en/

The Galleria dell'Accademia di Firenze ('gallery of the academy of Florence') is an art museum in Florence, in Tuscany in central Italy. It houses the Michelangelo sculpture David and other sculptures by Michelangelo, and a large collection of paintings by Florentine artists, mostly from the period 1300–1600 (the Trecento to the Late Renaissance). It is smaller and more specialised than the Uffizi, the main art museum in Florence. It adjoins the Accademia di Belle Arti or academy of fine arts of Florence, but despite the name has no other connection with it.

In 2016, it had 1.46 million visitors, making it the second-most-visited art museum in Italy after the Uffizi (2.02 million).

== History ==
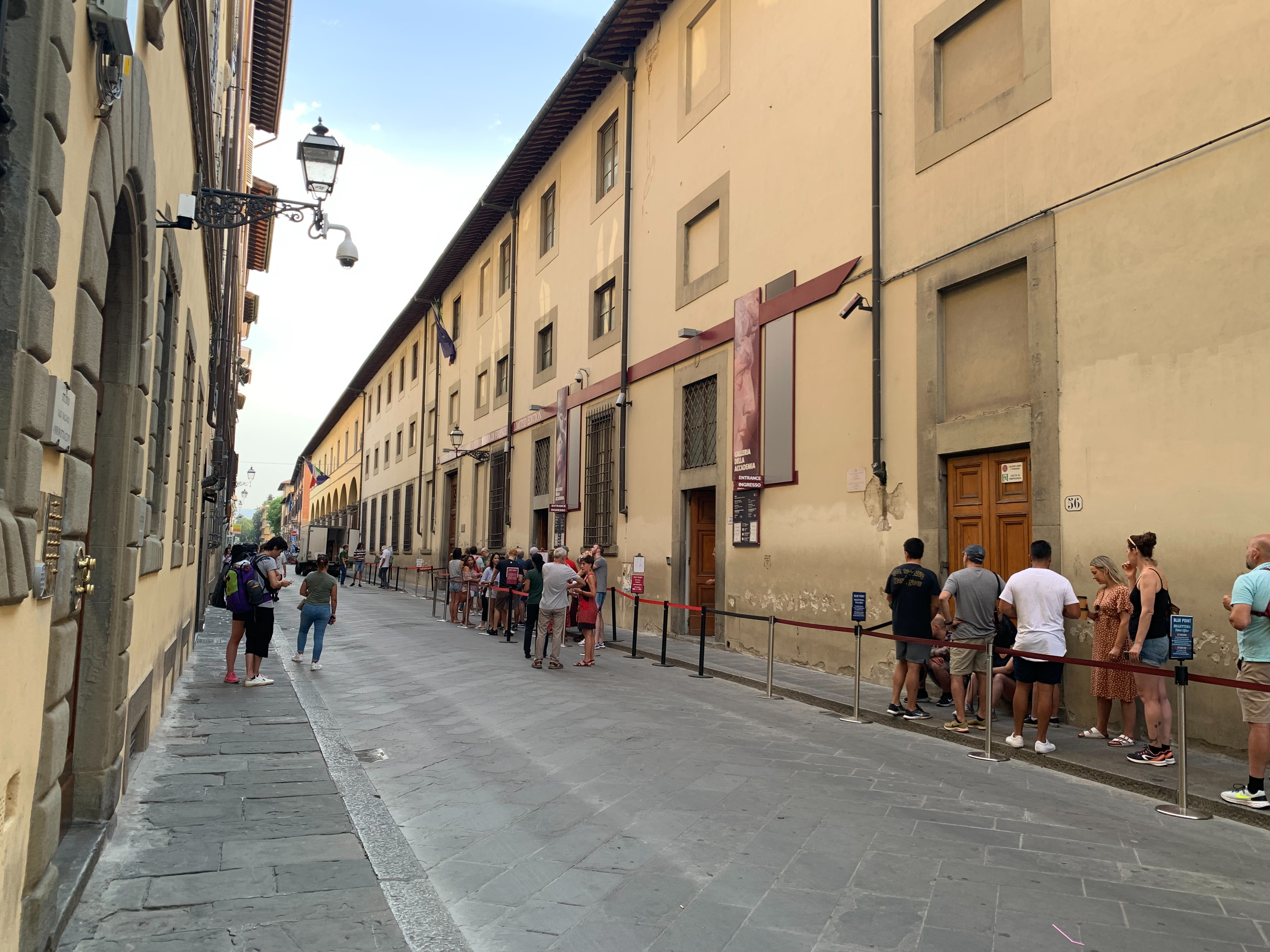
Exterior of the gallery

The Galleria dell'Accademia was founded in 1784 by Pietro Leopoldo, Grand Duke of Tuscany.

In 2001 the "Museo degli strumenti musicali" collection opened. It includes musical instruments made by Stradivarius, Niccolò Amati and Bartolomeo Cristofori which were acquired by the Florence Conservatory.

In 2023 the museum successfully sued a magazine publisher for using an image of Michelangelo's David without the permission of the museum, even though the artwork (which is physically in the museum) belongs to the public domain. The museum also objected to GQ Italia using a lenticular cover to switch between an image of the statue and Pietro Boselli.

== Works ==
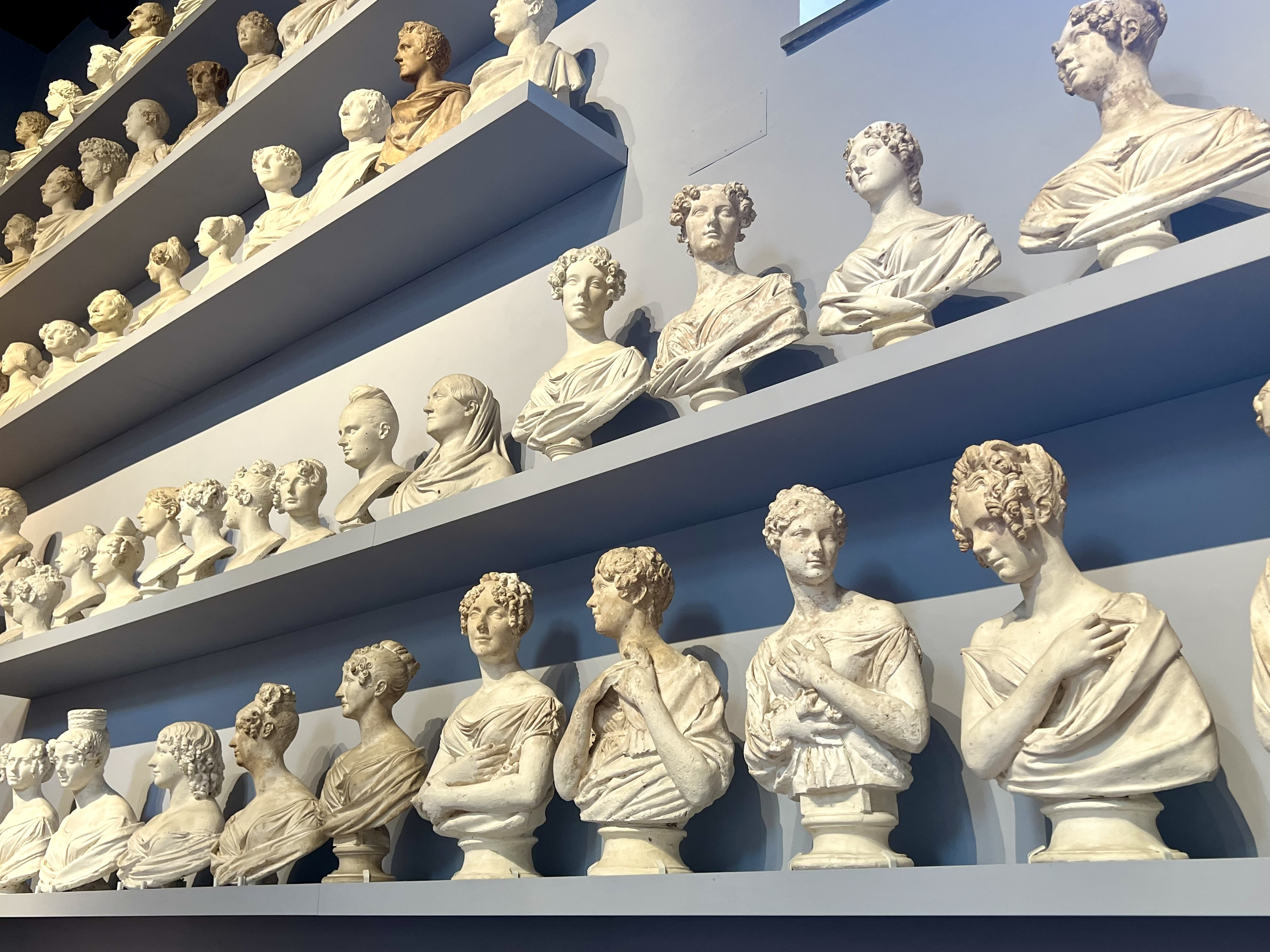
Wall of busts displayed at the museum

The Galleria dell'Accademia has housed the original David by Michelangelo since 1873. The sculpture was allegedly brought to the Accademia for reasons of conservation, although other factors were involved in its move from its previous outdoor location on Piazza della Signoria. The original intention was to create a "Michelangelo museum", with original sculptures and drawings, to celebrate the fourth centenary of the artist's birth. Today, the gallery's small collection of Michelangelo's work includes his four unfinished Prisoners, intended for the tomb of Pope Julius II, and a statue of Saint Matthew, also unfinished. In 1939, these were joined by the Palestrina Pietà, discovered in the Barberini chapel in Palestrina, though experts now consider its attribution to Michelangelo to be dubious.

Other works on display are Florentine paintings from the thirteenth and sixteenth centuries, including works by Paolo Uccello, Domenico Ghirlandaio, Sandro Botticelli and Andrea del Sarto; and, from the High Renaissance, Giambologna's original full-size plaster modello for the Abduction of a Sabine Woman. As well as a number of Florentine Gothic paintings, the gallery houses the collection of Russian icons assembled by the Grand Dukes of the House of Lorraine, of which Leopoldo was one.
