= Francesco Barberini =

Francesco Barberini may refer to:

- Francesco Barberini (died 1600), uncle of Pope Urban VIII and the subject of the Bust of Francesco Barberini
- Francesco Barberini (1597–1679), Cardinal-nephew of Pope Urban VIII from 1623
- Francesco Barberini (1662–1738), Cardinal from 1690
