= Bust of Cardinal Melchior Klesl =

Sculpture by Gian Lorenzo Bernini

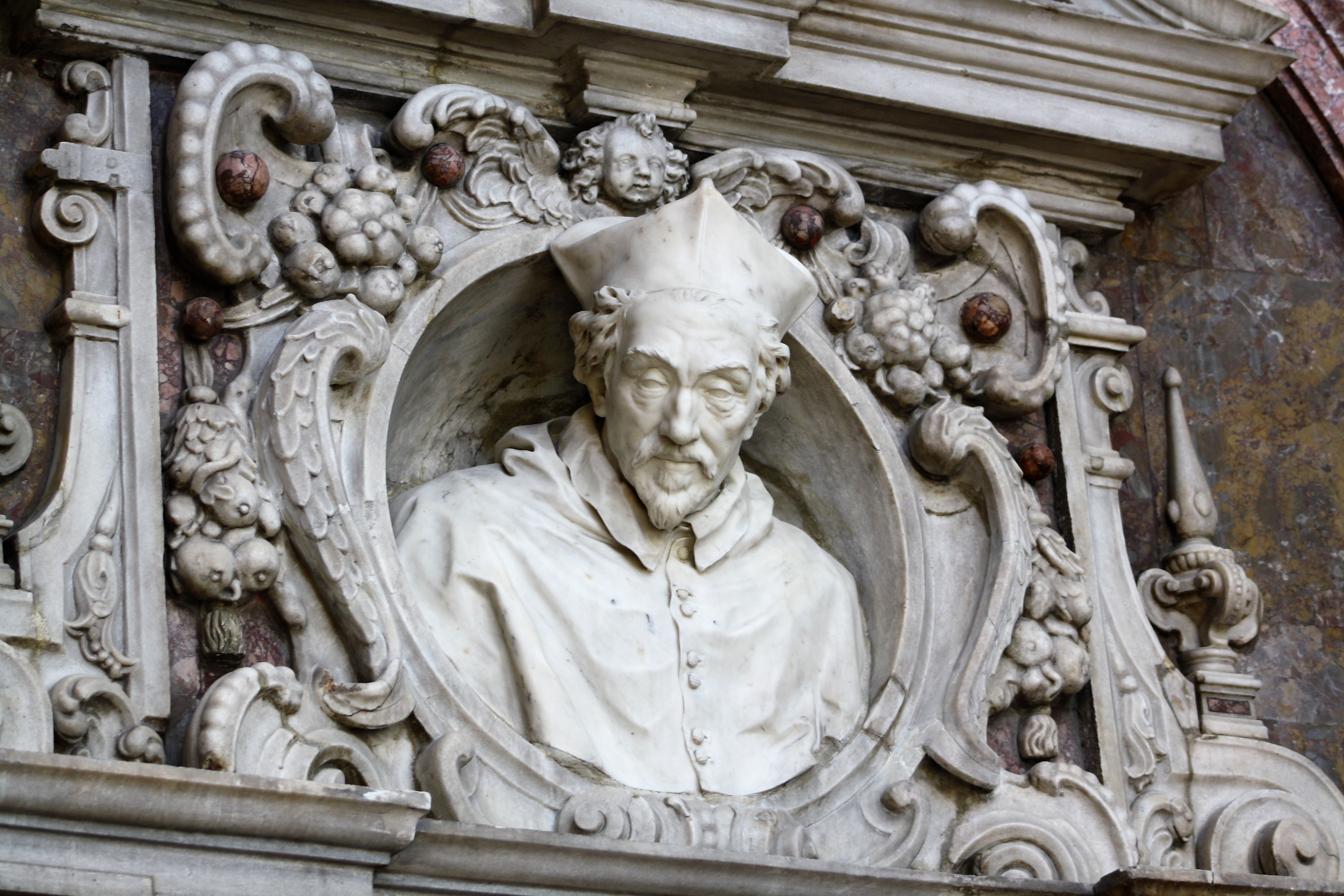
- Epitaph of Cardinal Melchior Klesl
- Artist: Gian Lorenzo Bernini
- Year: 1626
- Catalogue: 22
- Type: Sculpture
- Medium: Marble
- Location: Wiener Neustadt Cathedral; Wiener Neustadt
- Preceded by: St. Peter's Baldachin
- Followed by: Two Angels in Sant'Agostino

The Bust of Cardinal Melchior Klesl is a life-size marble bust of the seventeenth-century cardinal by Gianlorenzo Bernini and his assistants, notably Giuliano Finelli. It was probably executed in 1626. It is unclear how much of the work was executed by Bernini and how much by Finelli, or indeed others in Bernini's studio. The sculpture is part of Klesl's tomb in the cathedral of Wiener Neustadt, just south of Vienna.

== See also ==
- List of works by Gian Lorenzo Bernini
