= Ciborium (architecture) =

Canopy or covering that covers the altar in a church

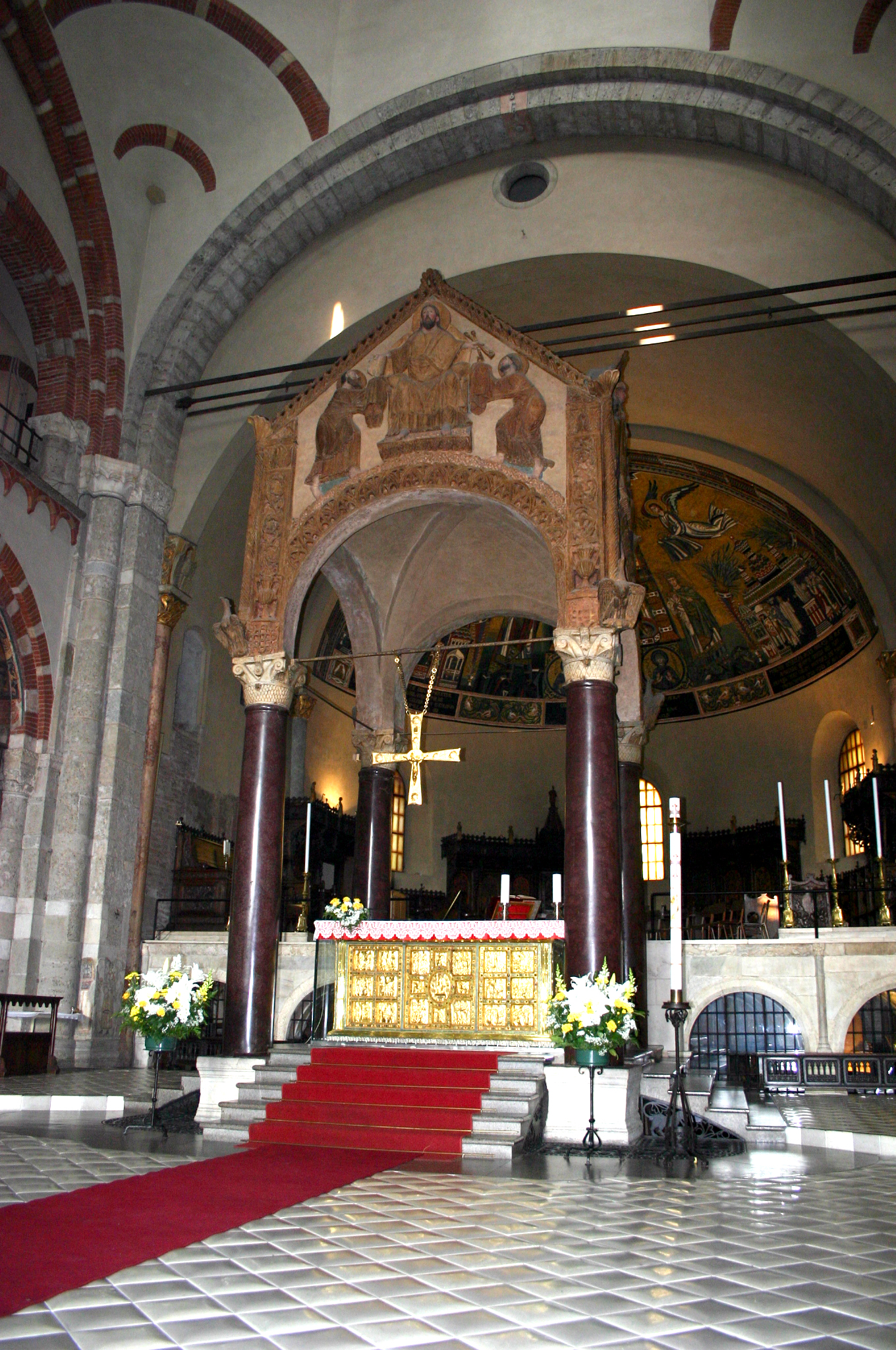
Ciborium of Sant'Ambrogio, Milan; note the rods for curtains. The columns are probably 4th century, the canopy 9th, 10th or 12th century.

In ecclesiastical architecture, a ciborium (Greek: κιβώριον; lit. 'ciborion') is a canopy or covering supported by columns, freestanding in the sanctuary, that stands over and covers the altar in a church. It may also be known by the more general term of baldachin, though ciborium is often considered more correct for examples in churches. A baldachin (originally an exotic type of silk from Baghdad) should have a textile covering, or, as at St. Peter’s Basilica in Vatican City, imitate one. There are exceptions; St. Peter's Baldachin, Bernini's structure in Saint Peter's Basilica, is always called the baldachin.

Early ciboria had curtains hanging from rods between the columns, so that the altar could be concealed from the congregation at points in the liturgy. Smaller examples may cover other objects in a church. In a very large church, a ciborium is an effective way of visually highlighting the altar, and emphasizing its importance. The altar and ciborium are often set upon a dais to raise it above the floor of the sanctuary.

A ciborium is also a covered, chalice-shaped container for Eucharistic hosts. In Italian the word is often used for the tabernacle on the altar, which is not the case in English.

== History ==
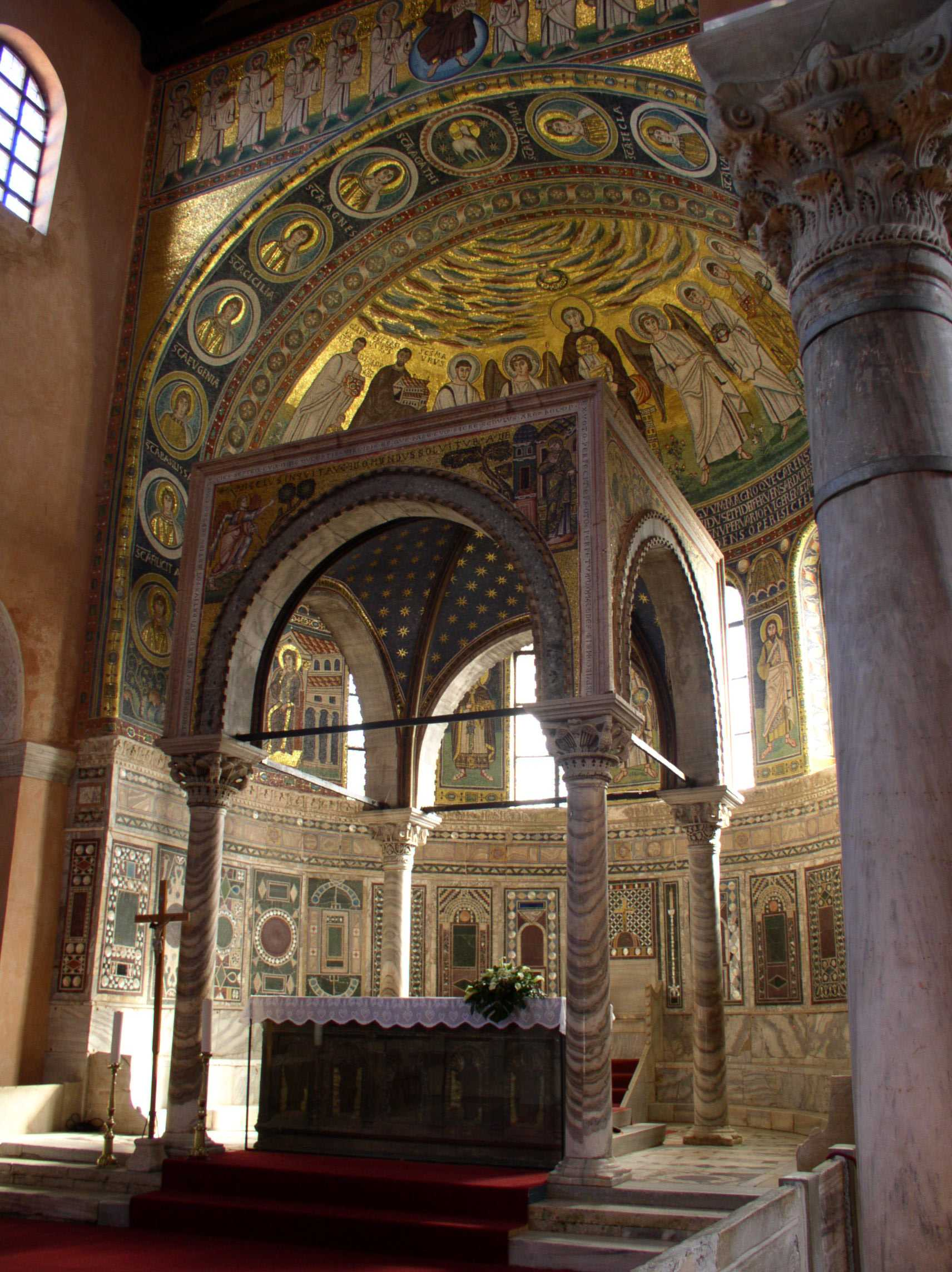
The Euphrasian Basilica in Poreč, Croatia. The columns are 6th century, and canopy from 1277.

The ciborium arose in the context of a wide range of canopies, both honorific and practical, used in the ancient world to cover both important persons and religious images or objects. Some of these were temporary and portable, including those using poles and textiles, and others permanent structures. Roman emperors are often shown underneath such a structure, often called an aedicula ("little house"), which term is reserved in modern architectural usage to a niche-like structure attached to a wall, but was originally used more widely. Examples can be seen on many coins, in the Missorium of Theodosius I, the Chronography of 354, and other Late Antique works. The Holy of Holies of the Jewish Temple of Jerusalem, a room whose entrance was covered by the parochet, a curtain or "veil", was certainly regarded as a precedent by the church; the naos containing the cult image in an Egyptian temple is perhaps a comparable structure.

The free-standing domed ciborium-like structure that stood over what was thought to be the site of Jesus's tomb within the Church of the Holy Sepulchre in Jerusalem was called the aedicula (or edicule), and was a key sight for pilgrims, often shown in art, for example in the Monza Ampullae. This structure, erected under Constantine the Great, may itself have been important in spreading the idea of ciboria over altars. The later structure now in its place is far larger, with solid stone walls; the silver plaques covering the old structure were apparently used to make coins to pay the army defending Jerusalem against Saladin in the desperate days of 1187. Ciboria were placed over the shrines of martyrs, which then had churches built over them, with the altar over the spot believed to be the site of the burial. They also served to shelter the altar from dust and the like from high ceilings that could only rarely be reached.

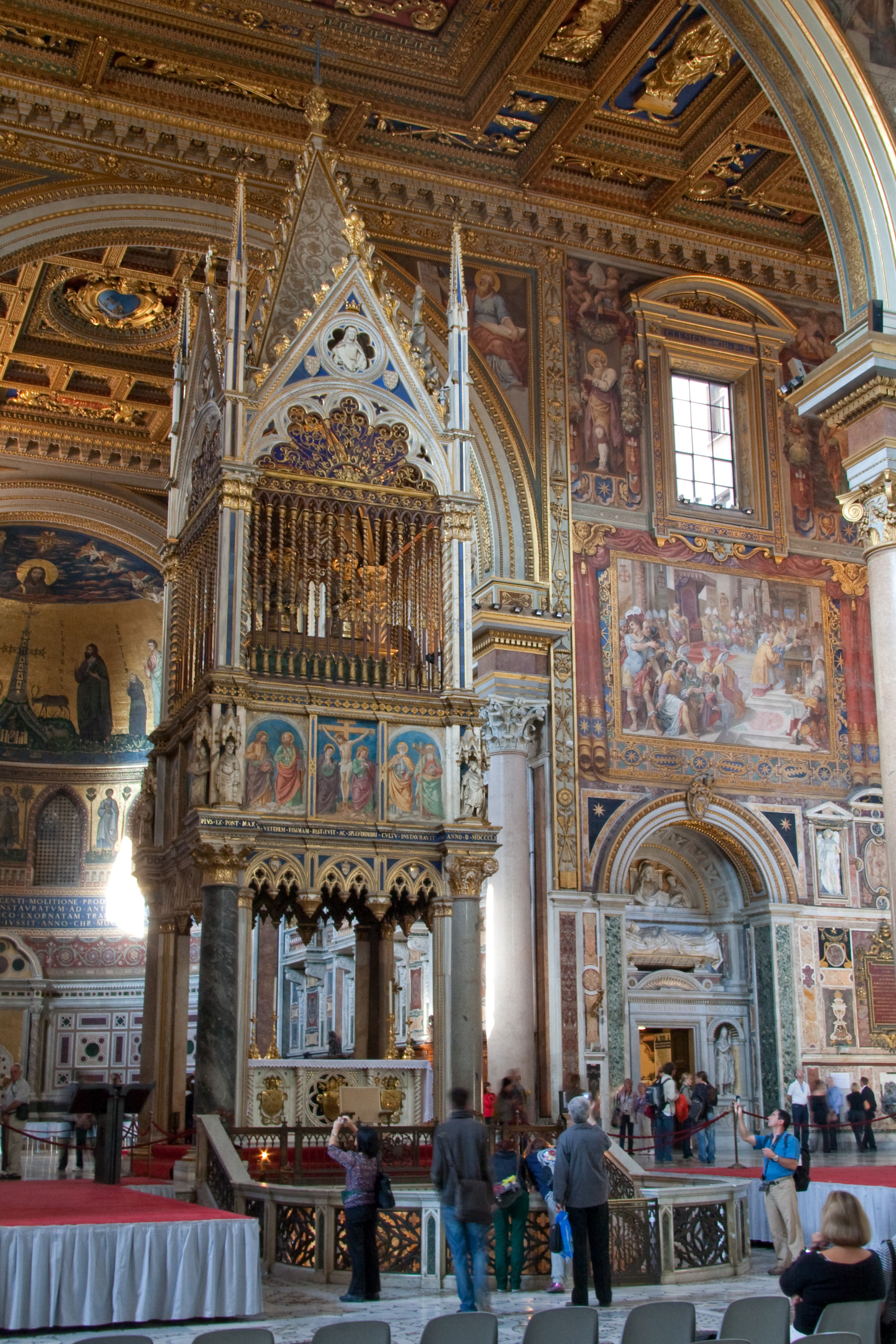
Basilica of Saint John Lateran in Rome, by Arnolfo di Cambio

Possibly the earliest important example over an altar was in the Basilica of Saint John Lateran in Rome, also donated by Constantine, looted by the Visigoths in the 5th century and now replaced by a large Gothic structure (see below). This is described as a fastigium in the earliest sources, but was probably a ciborium. Like most major early examples it was "of silver", whose weight is given, presumably meaning that decorated silver plaques were fixed to a wood or stone framework. No early examples in precious metal have survived, but many are recorded in important churches. Possibly the earliest ciborium to survive largely complete is one in Sant'Apollinare in Classe in Ravenna (not over the main altar), which is dated to 806-810, though the columns of the example at Sant'Ambrogio appear to date from the original 4th-century church.

The ciborium commissioned by Justinian the Great for Hagia Sophia in Constantinople and described by Paulus Silentarius is now lost. It was also of silver, nielloed, surmounted by "a globe of pure gold weighing 118 pounds, and golden lilies weighing 4 pounds [each], and above these a golden cross with precious and rare stones, which cross weighed 80 pounds of gold". The roof had eight panels rising to the globe and cross.

The Early Medieval Eastern Orthodox church "directed that the eucharist be celebrated at an altar with a ciborium, from which hung the vessel in which the consecrated host was kept", the vessel sometimes being in the form of a dove. Early depictions of the Last Supper in Christian art, showing the Communion of the Apostles, show them queueing to receive the bread and wine from Christ, who stands under or beside a ciborium, presumably reflecting contemporary liturgical practice. An example of this type is in mosaic in the apse of the Saint Sophia Cathedral in Kyiv, under a very large standing Virgin.

According to the 8th-century saint and Patriarch Germanus I of Constantinople: "The ciborium represents here the place where Christ was crucified; for the place where He was buried was nearby and raised on a base. It is placed in the church in order to represent concisely the crucifixion, burial, and resurrection of Christ. It similarly corresponds to the ark of the covenant of the Lord in which, it is written, is His Holy of Holies and His holy place. Next to it God commanded that two wrought Cherubim be placed on either side (cf Ex 25:18) —for KIB is the ark, and OURIN is the effulgence, or the light, of God." (Τὸ κιβώριόν ἐστι ἀντὶ τοῦ τόπου ἔνθα ἐσταυρώθη ὁ Χριστός· ἐγγὺς γὰρ ἦν ὁ τόπος καὶ ὑπόβαθρος ἔνθα ἐτάφη· ἀλλὰ διὰ τὸ ἐν συντομίᾳ ἐκφέρεσθαι τὴν σταύρωσιν, τὴν ταφὴν καὶ τὴν ἀνάστασιν τοῦ Χριστοῦ ἐν τῇ Ἐκκλησίᾳ τέτακται. Ἔστι δὲ καὶ κατὰ τὴν κιβωτὸν τῆς διαθήκης Κυρίου, ἐν ᾗ λέγεται Ἅγια Ἁγίων καὶ ἁγίασμα αὐτοῦ· ἐν ᾗ προσέταξεν ὁ Θεὸς γενέσθαι δύο χερουβὶμ ἑκατέρωθεν τορευτά· τὸ γὰρ ΚΙΒ ἐστὶ κιβωτός, τὸ δὲ ΟΥΡΙΝ φωτισμὸς Θεοῦ, ἢ φῶς Θεοῦ.)

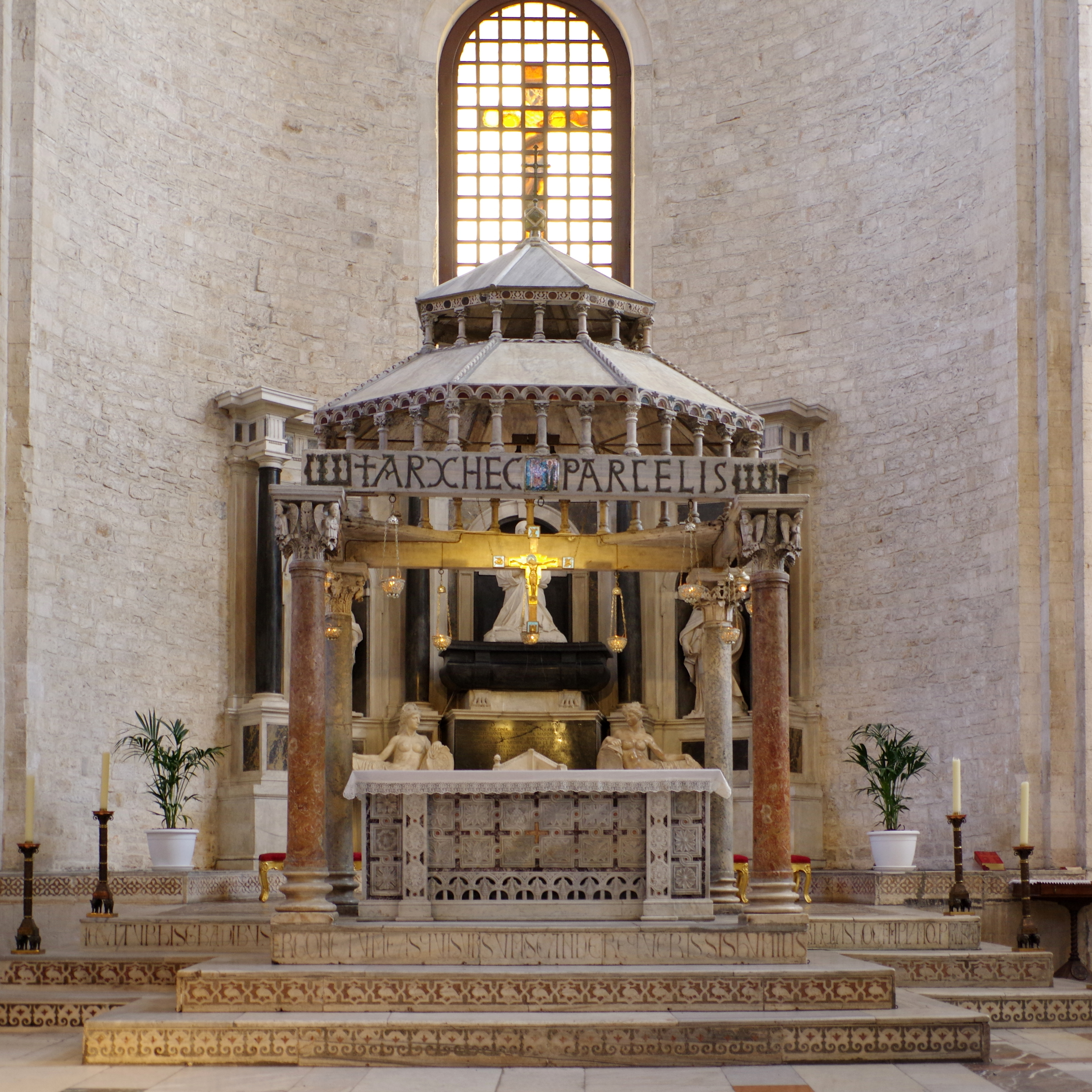
Basilica di San Nicola in Bari, Italy

Examples in Orthodox manuscripts mostly show rounded dome roofs, but surviving early examples in the West often placed a circular canopy over four columns, with tiers of little columns supporting two or more stages rising to a central finial, giving a very open appearance, and allowing candles to be placed along the beams between the columns. The example by the Cosmati in the gallery is similar to another 12th-century Italian ciborium now in the Metropolitan Museum of Art in New York, and that in the Basilica di San Nicola in Bari. By the Romanesque, gabled forms, as at Sant'Ambrogio, or ones with a flat top, as at the Euphrasian Basilica (illustrated) or St Mark's, Venice, are more typical.

In Gothic architecture the gabled form already used at Sant'Ambrogio returns, now with an elaborate spire-like pinnacle. Probably the most elaborate is the one in the Basilica of Saint John Lateran in Rome, designed by Arnolfo di Cambio and later painted by Barna da Siena. The columns here and at San Paolo Fuori le Mura are still re-used classical ones, in porphyry at San Paolo and Sant'Ambrogio (Sant'Apollinare Nuovo in Ravenna has its porphyry columns, with no canopy surviving). Most of the surviving early examples are in stone in basilica churches, especially in Rome and other parts of Italy; it is unclear how common examples, perhaps in wood, once were in smaller churches.

== Altar curtains ==
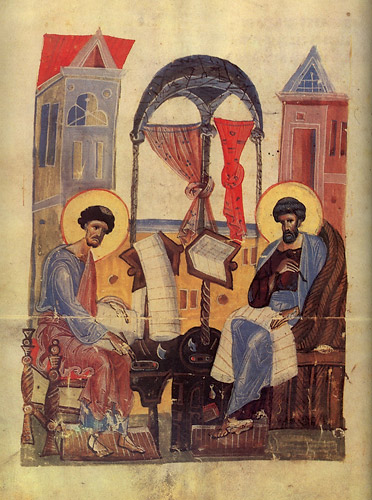
13th-century Yaroslavl Gospels, with curtained ciborium in the centre; a common motif in Evangelist portraits

Images and documentary mentions of early examples often have curtains called tetravela hung between the columns; these altar-curtains were used to cover and then reveal the view of the altar by the congregation at points during services — exactly which points varied, and is often unclear. Altar-curtains survived the decline of the ciborium in both East and West, and in English are often called riddels (from French rideau, a word once also used for ordinary domestic curtains). A few churches have "riddle posts" or "riddel posts" around the altar, which supported the curtain-rails, and perhaps a cloth stretched above. Such an arrangement, open above, can be seen in folio 199v of the Très Riches Heures du Duc de Berry. Late medieval examples in Northern Europe were often topped by angels, and the posts, but not the curtains, were revived in some new or refitted Anglo-Catholic churches by Ninian Comper and others around 1900.

In earlier periods the curtains were closed at the most solemn part of the Mass, a practice that continues to the present day in the Coptic and Armenian churches. A comparison to the biblical Veil of the Temple was intended. The small domed structures, usually with red curtains, that are often shown near the writing saint in early Evangelist portraits, especially in the East, represent a ciborium, as do the structures surrounding many manuscript portraits of medieval rulers.

A single curtain hung, usually on a wall, behind an altar, is called a dossal.

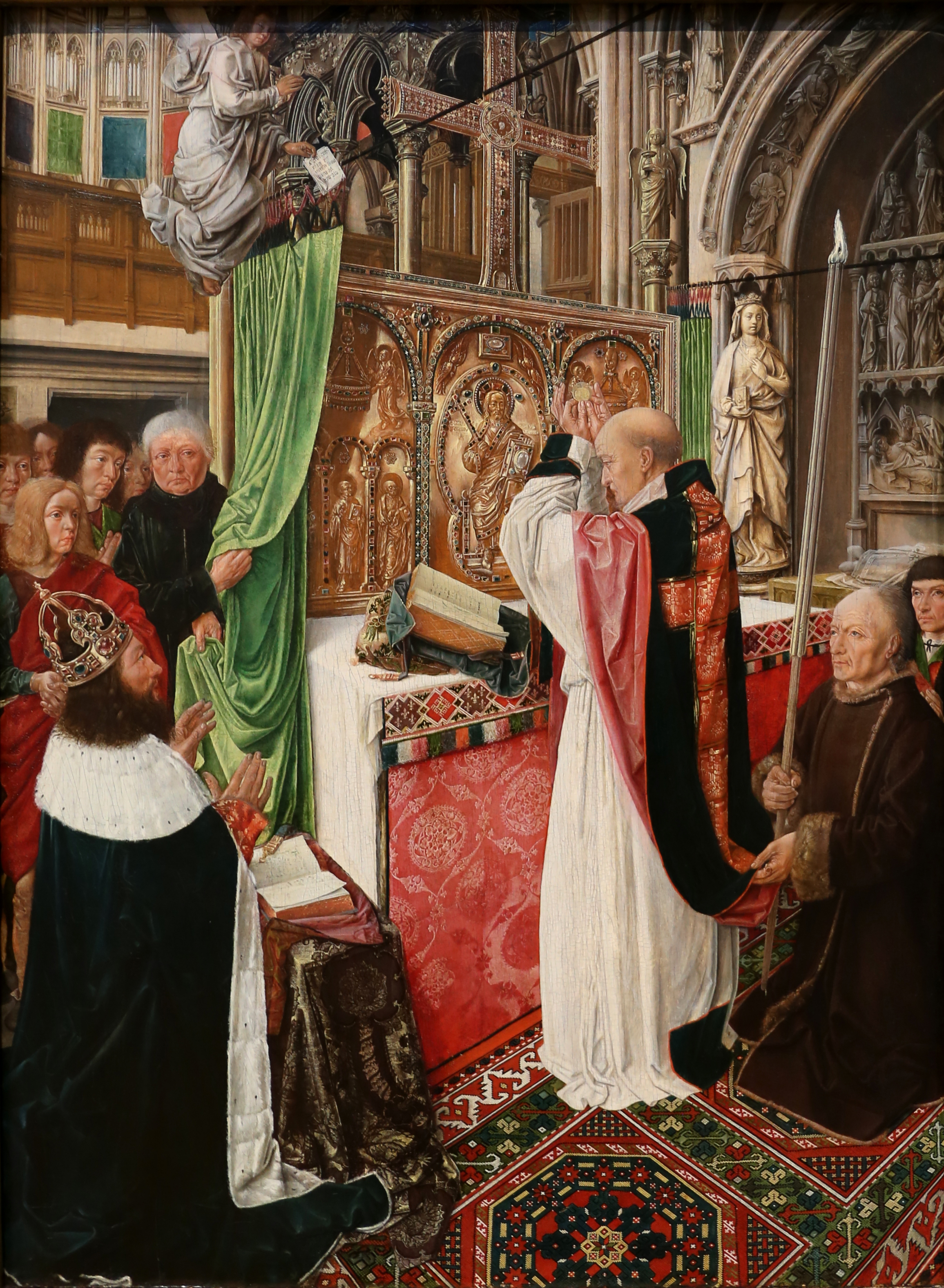
Green riddel curtains, with a metalwork dossal, in the Mass of St Gilles by the Master of Saint Giles

== Other uses ==
Ciboria, often much smaller, were sometimes also erected to cover particular objects, especially icons and reliquaries, and smaller ciboria that stood on, rather than over, the altar are also found. The word may also be used of some large sculptural structures that stand behind an altar, often offering no canopy or covering as such, for example at Siena Cathedral. These may be free-standing, or built against a wall, and usage here overlaps with the terms tabernacle and retable. The typical Gothic form of canopied niche to enclose a statue may be regarded as a "reduced form of ciborium".

A very famous ciborium that apparently did not stand over an altar was one that apparently functioned as a quasi-reliquary shrine or symbolic tomb for the missing remains of St Demetrius of Thessaloniki in Hagios Demetrios, the large and important church erected in Thessaloniki over the mass grave in which he was traditionally buried. This appears, from various accounts of miracles associated with it, and depictions in mosaic, to have been a free-standing roofed structure inside the church, at one side of the nave, with doors or walls in precious metal all around it. It was hexagonal and made of or covered with silver; inside there was a couch or bed. The roof had flat triangular panels rising shallowly to a central point. It was rebuilt at least once. A medium-sized 13th-century ciborium in a corner of San Marco, Venice, known as the capitello ('little chapel'), was used for the display of important icons and relics in the Middle Ages.

== Decline and revival ==
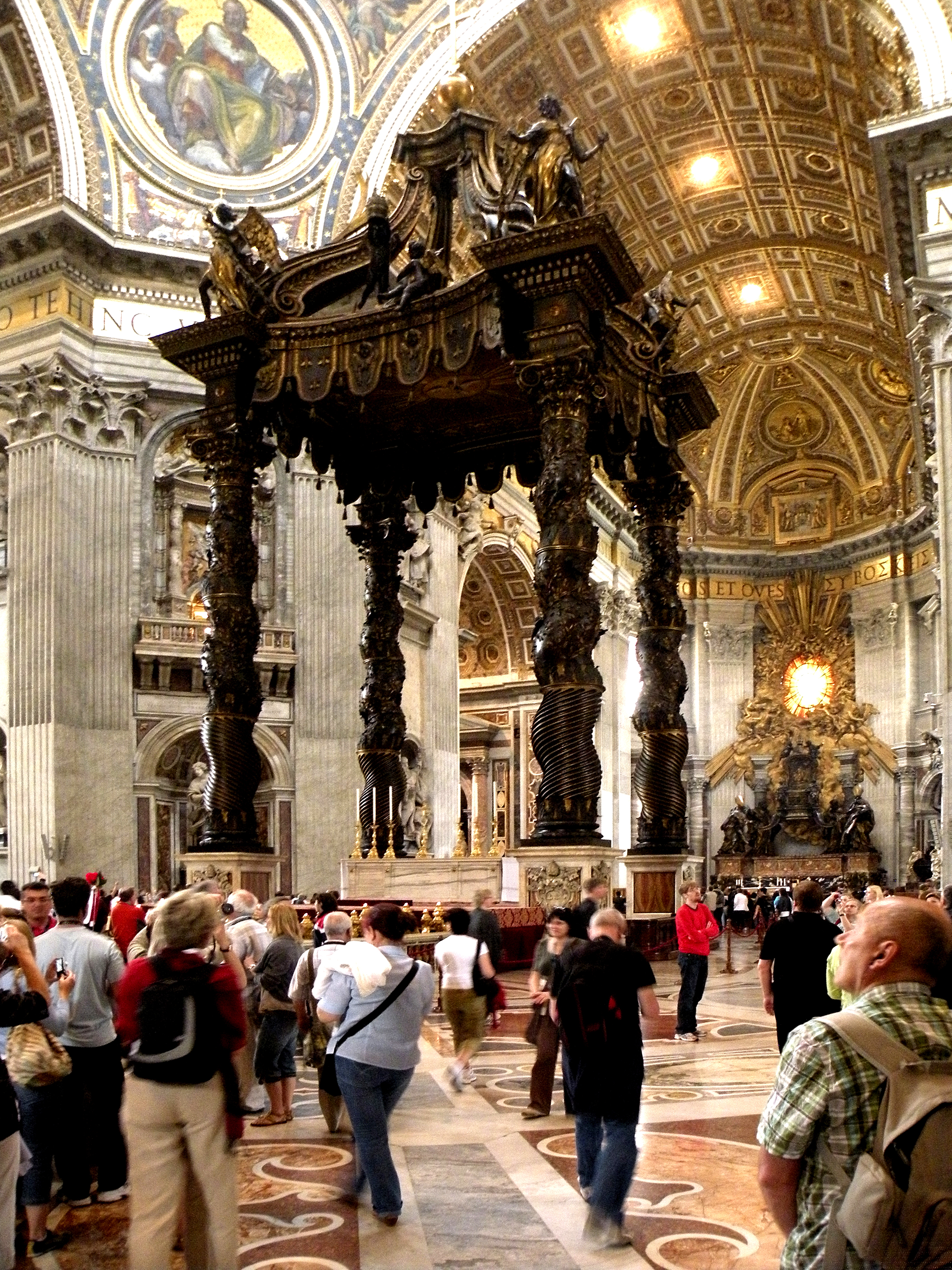
Bernini's St. Peter's Baldachin (1620s), actually a ciborium, was hugely influential on later ciboria

Ciboria are now much rarer in churches in both East and West, as the introduction of other structures that screened the altar, such as the iconostasis in the East and rood screen and pulpitum in the West, meant that they would be little seen, and smaller examples often conflicted with the large altarpieces that came into fashion in the later Middle Ages. They enjoyed something of a revival after the Renaissance once again opened up the view of the sanctuary, but never again became usual even in large churches. Bernini's St. Peter's Baldachin, an enormous ciborium in Saint Peter's Basilica, Vatican City, is a famous exception; it is the largest in existence, and always called a baldachin. Many other elaborate aedicular Baroque altar surrounds that project from, but remain attached to, the wall behind, and have pairs of columns on each side, may be thought of as hinting at the ciborium without exactly using its form.

The Gothic Revival saw the true free-standing ciborium return to some popularity: the Votive Church, Vienna has a large Gothic example designed in 1856, and Ninian Comper built a number, including one for Pusey House. Peterborough Cathedral has a neo-Gothic example, and Derby Cathedral one with the Romanesque small columns below a neo-classical architrave and pediment. Westminster Cathedral, a neo-Byzantine building, has a splayed version of 1894, with extra flanking columns, which within that context is "resolutely modernistic". The Gothic style of ciborium was also borrowed for some public monuments like the Albert Memorial in London, as it had been in the Middle Ages for the outdoor Scaliger Tombs in Verona. For other post-Renaissance versions, many variations of the basic square four-column plan, see the next section.

== Terms: ciborium or baldachin? ==
The word ciborium, in both senses, is said to derive from the cup-shaped seed vessel of the Egyptian water-lily nelumbium speciosum, which is supposed to have been used as a cup itself, and to resemble both the metal cup shape and, when inverted, the dome of the architectural feature, though the Grove Dictionary of Art, the Catholic Encyclopedia and other sources are somewhat dubious about this etymology, which goes back to at least the Late Antique period. An alternative is to derive the word from cibes ('food'). Both senses of the word were in use in classical times. The word baldachin derives from a luxurious type of cloth from Baghdad, from which name the word is derived, in English as baudekin and other spellings. Matthew Paris records that Henry III of England wore a robe "de preciosissimo baldekino" at a ceremony at Westminster Abbey in 1247. The word for the cloth became the word for the ceremonial canopies made from the cloth.

Bernini's St. Peter's Baldachin imitates in bronze a cloth canopy above, and thus has some claim to be called a baldachin, as it always is. A number of other Baroque ciboria, and secular architectural canopies, copied this conceit, for example Santa Maria Maggiore in Rome. The voluted top of the Bernini baldachin was also copied by a number of French architects, often producing structures around an altar with no actual canopy or roof, just columns arrayed in an approximate curve (a "rotunda altar"), with only an architrave and volutes above. Examples are at the churches at Val-de-Grâce (François Mansart and Jacques Lemercier, 1660s) and Saint-Louis-des-Invalides Cathedral (Jules Hardouin Mansart, 1706) in Paris, Angers Cathedral, Verdun Cathedral, Notre-Dame de Mouzon in Mouzon, Saint-Sauveur in Rennes, and the Saint-Sauveur Basilica in Dinan. These are usually called baldachins (not at Angers), and many have certainly departed from the traditional form of the ciborium. There is a Rococo German example at Worms Cathedral; many German Rococo churches used similar styles that were engaged with the apse wall, or partly so. In addition, according to the 1913 Catholic Encyclopedia articles on "Baldachin" and "Ciborium", the Catholic Church opted, apparently in the 20th century, to use officially ciborium only for the vessel and baldachin for all architectural forms. Architectural historians generally prefer to use ciborium at the least for all square four-column roofed forms.

== Gallery ==
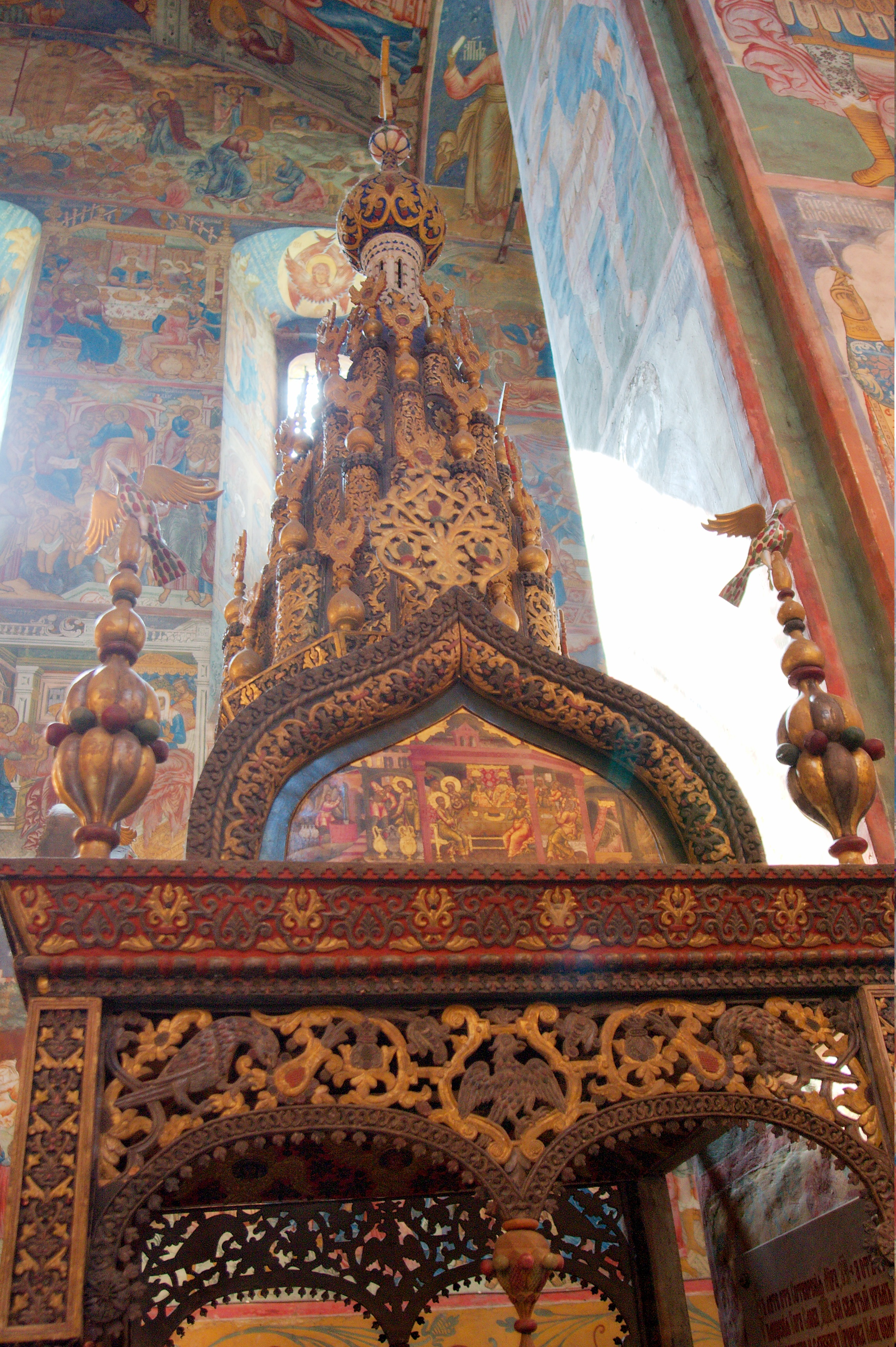
A 17th-century Orthodox ciborium from Church of Elijah the Prophet, Yaroslavl

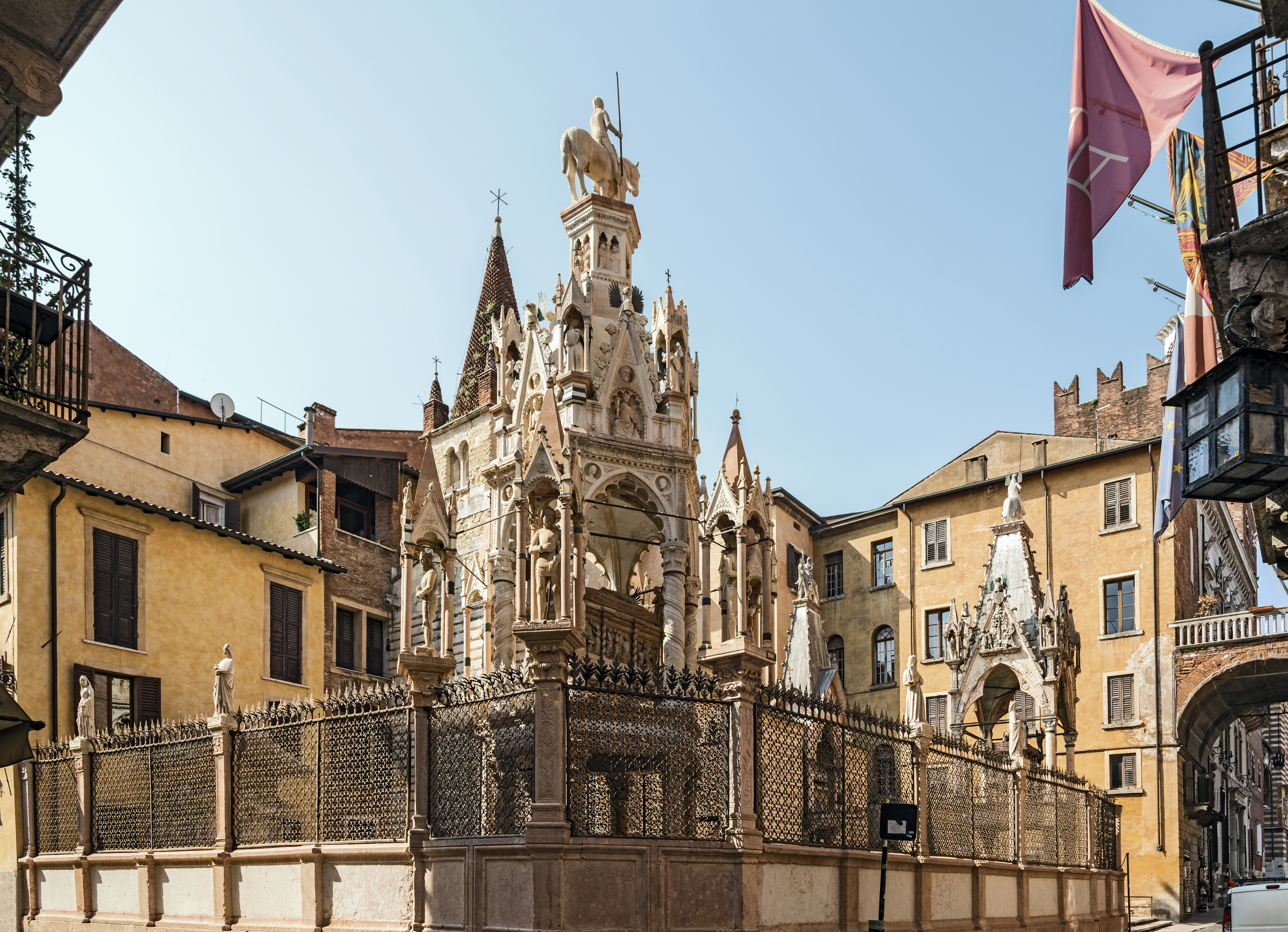
Scaliger Tombs, Verona, in the foreground the tomb of Cansignorio, and that of Mastino II behind.

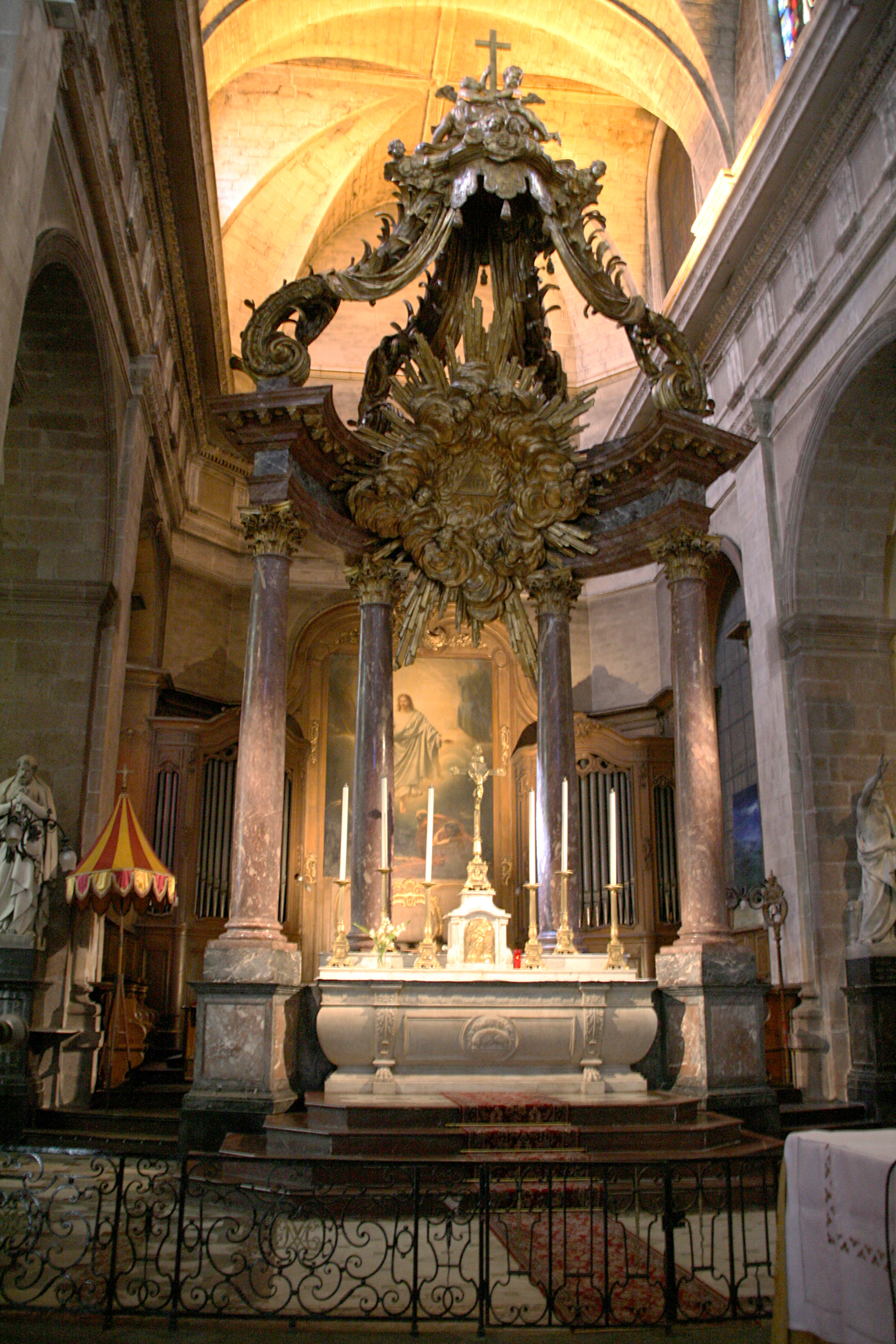
French canopy-less "rotunda altar", with voluted top derived from Bernini (Saint-Sauveur Basilica in Rennes)

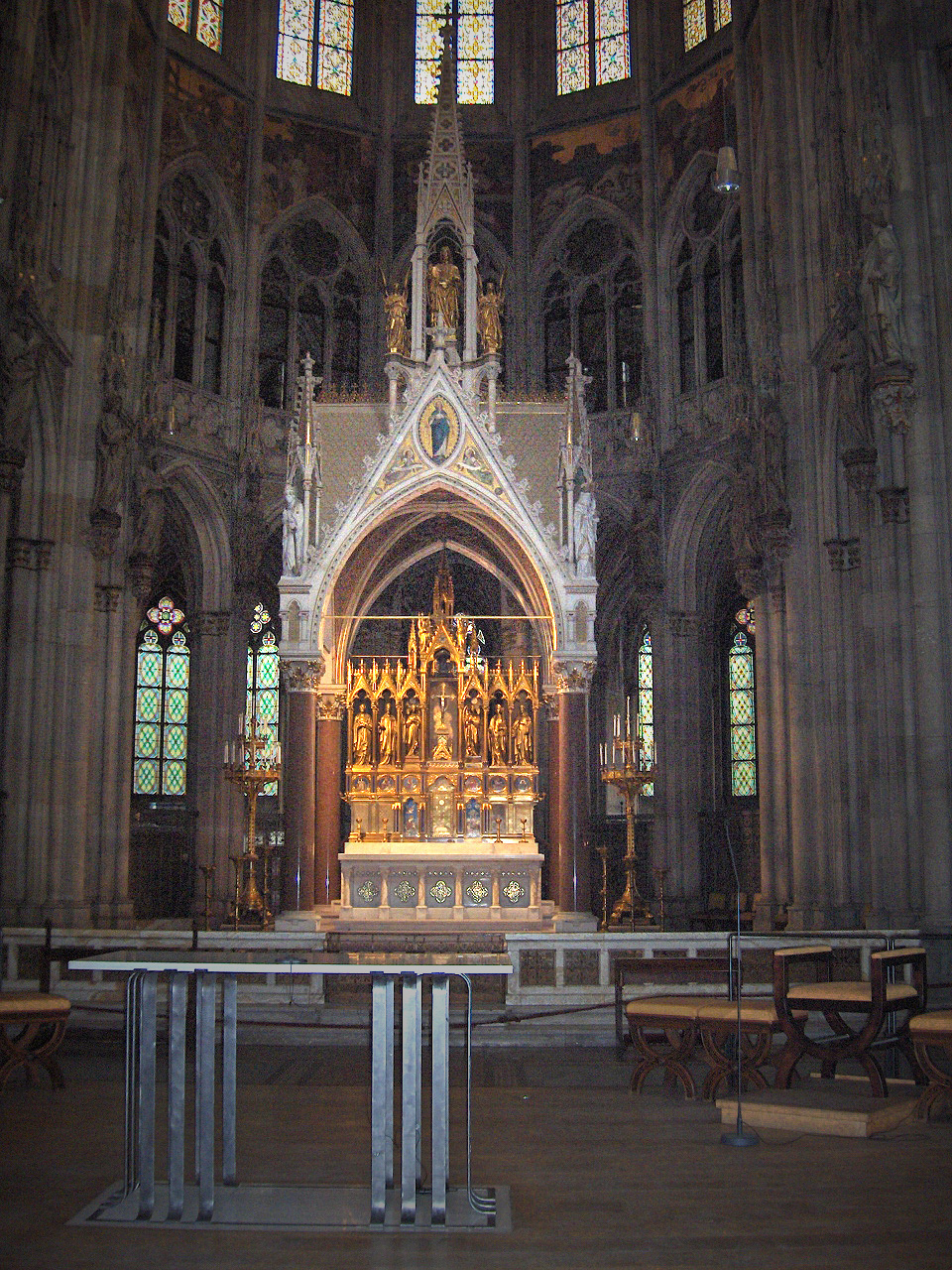
Votive Church, Vienna, designed in 1856

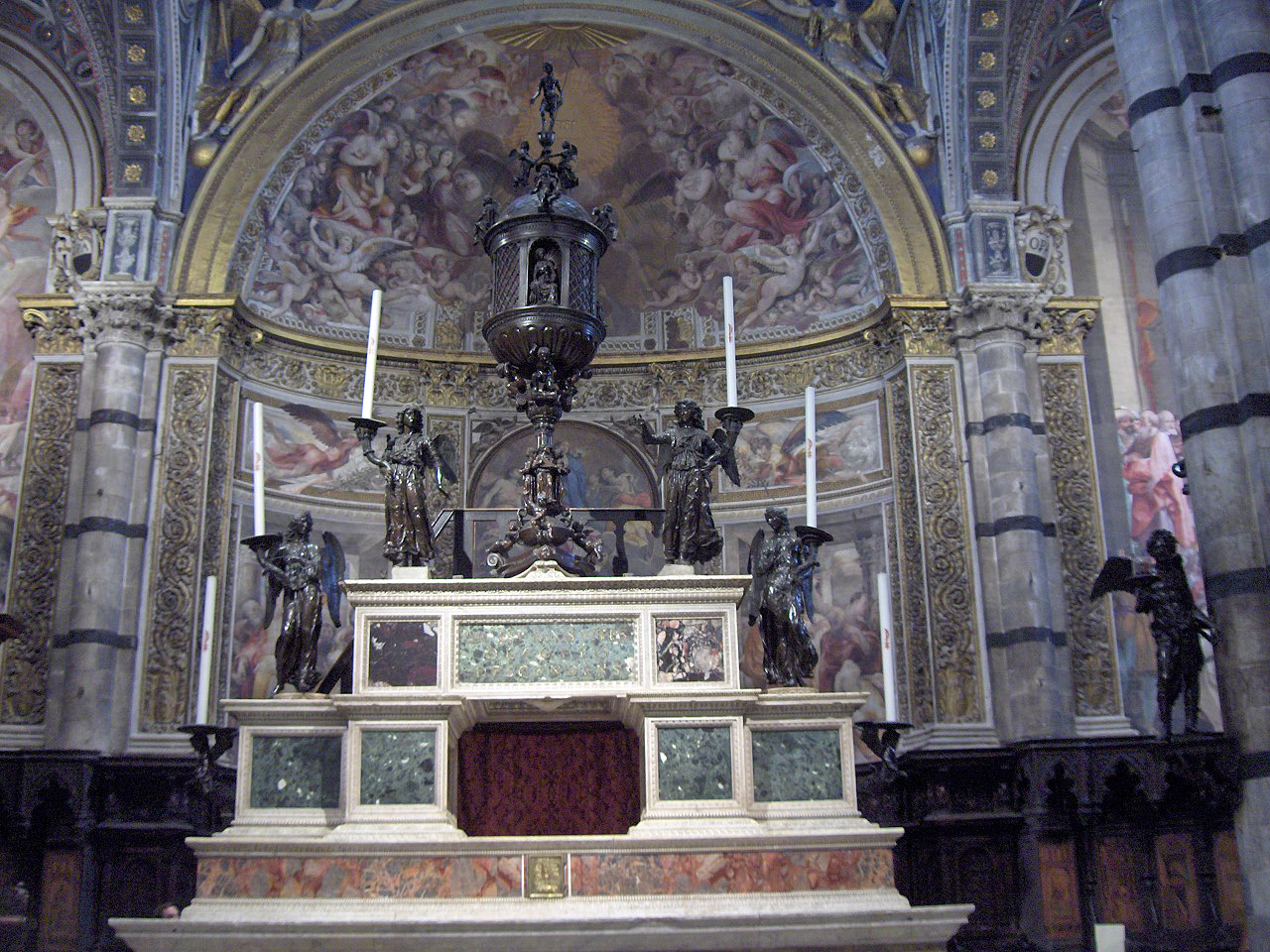
Siena Cathedral, Siena, free-standing with no canopy

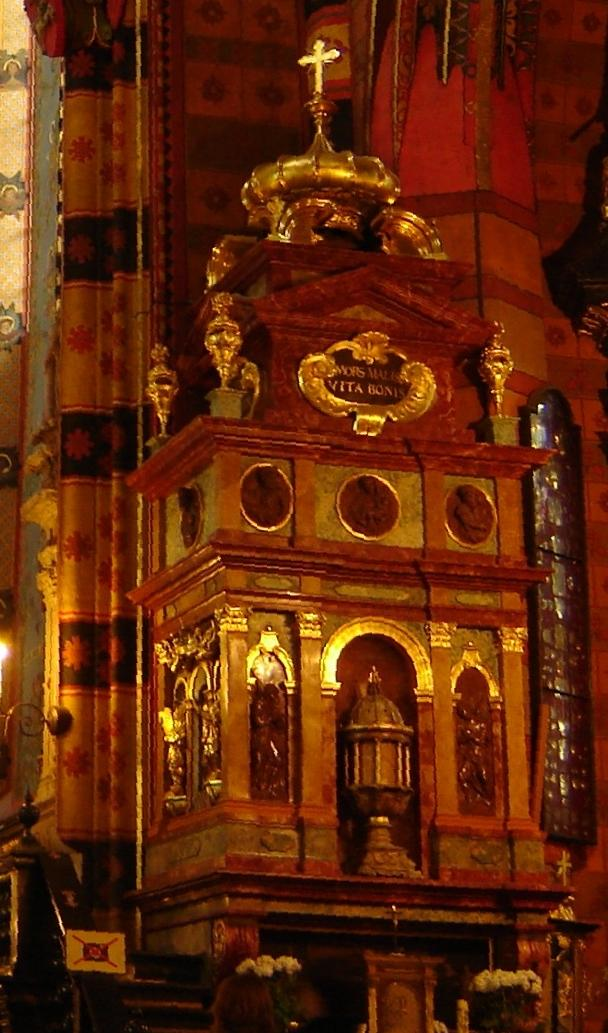
St. Mary's Basilica, Kraków, Poland, attached to a wall, with no canopy.

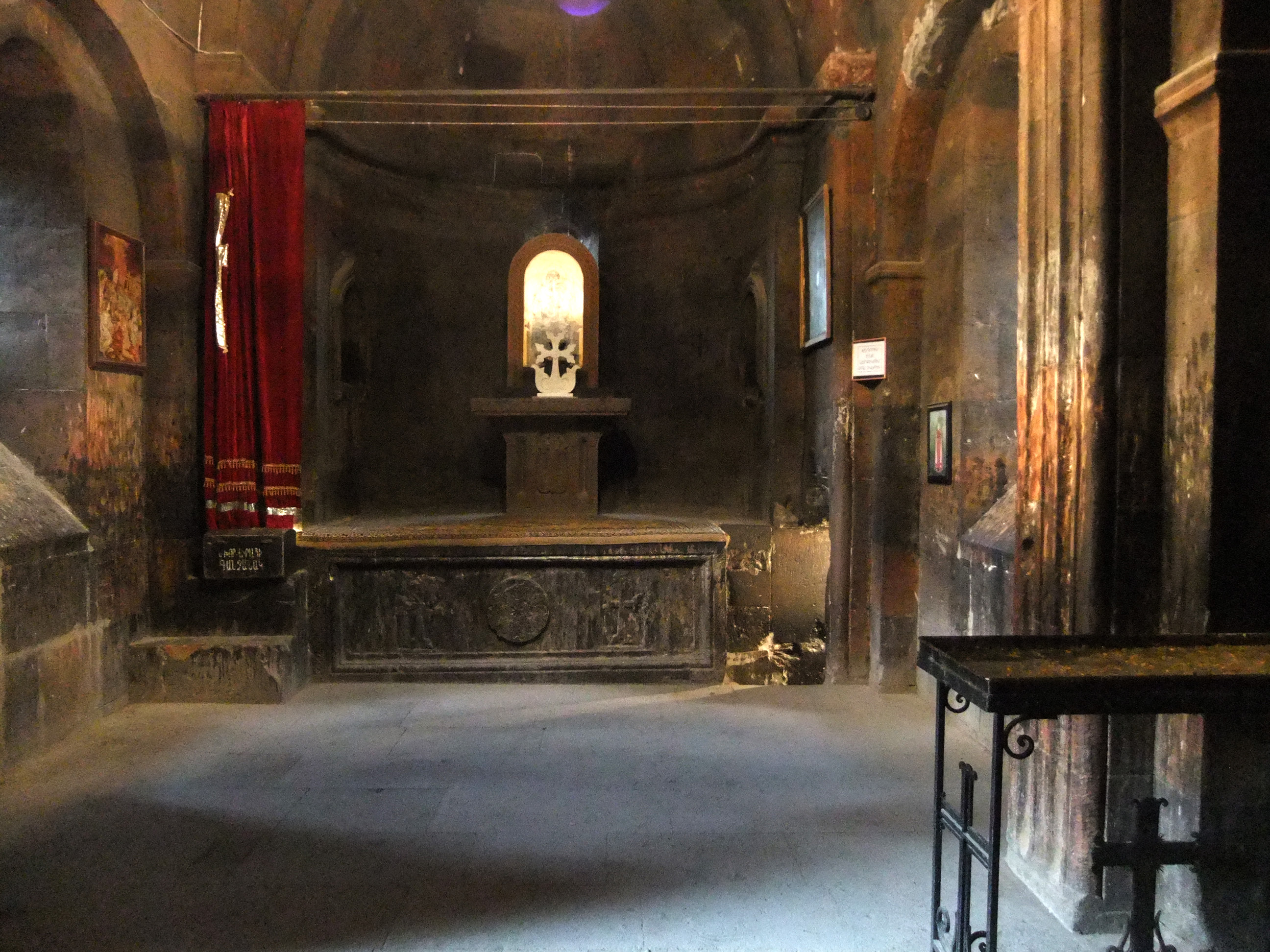
Altar-curtain in an Armenian monastery

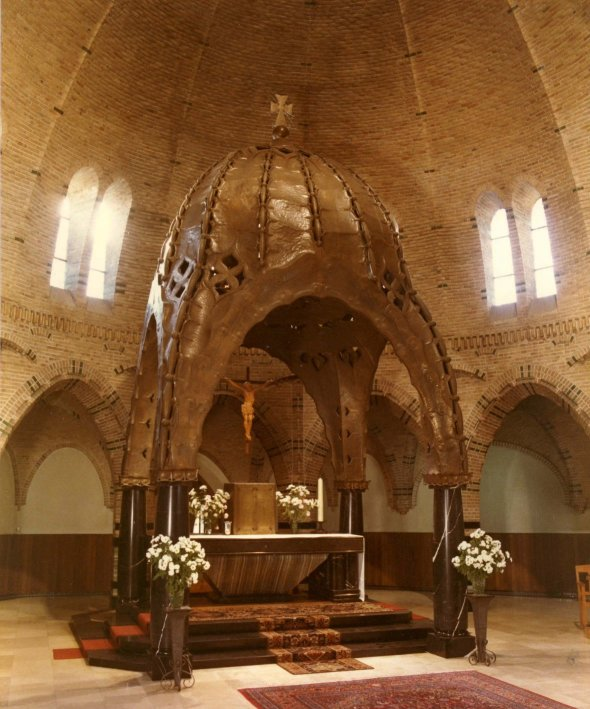
Copper baldachin in the Sint-Janskerk at Waalwijk (Netherlands) with the shape of leather skins, 1924

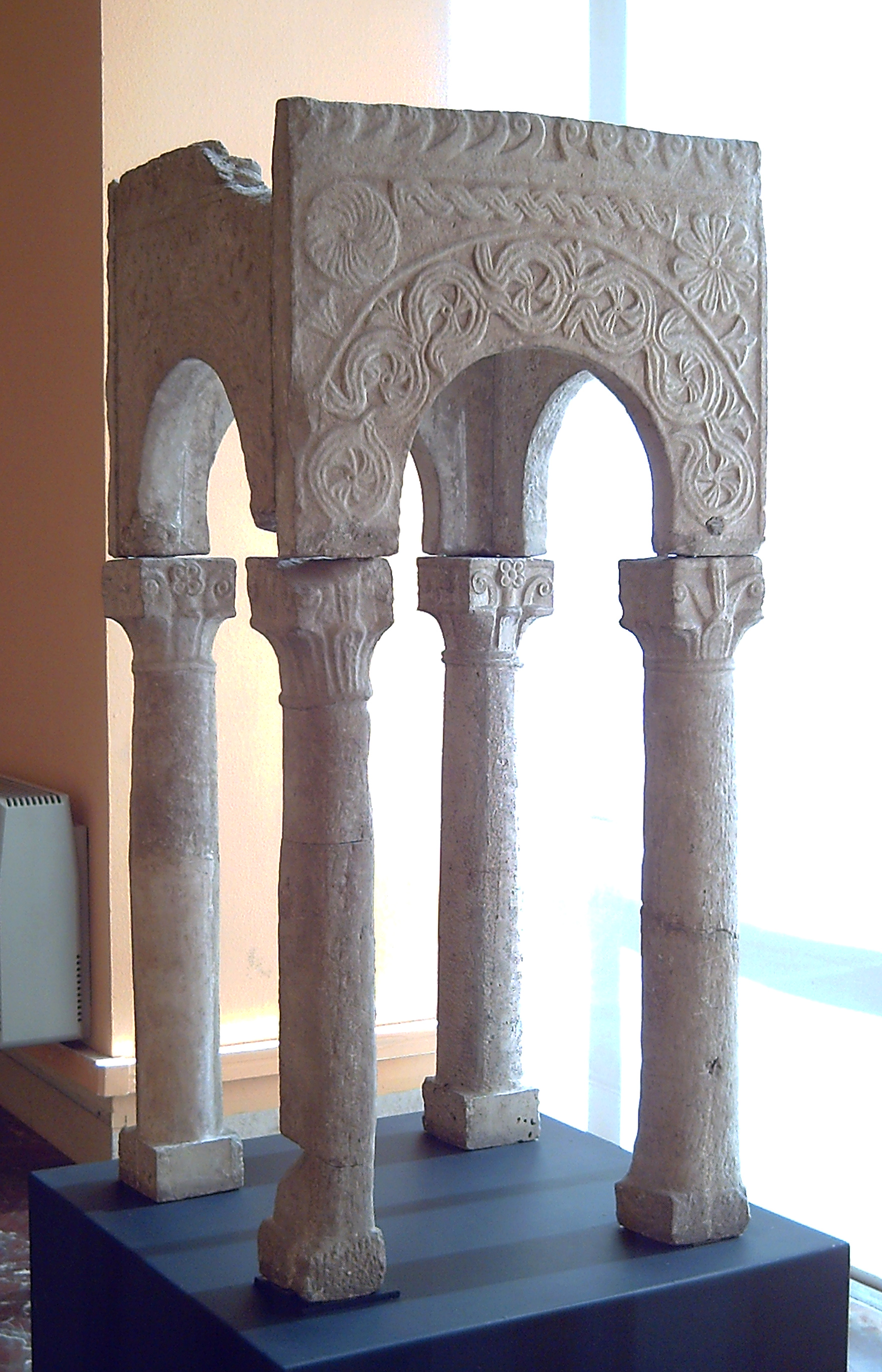
Small Pre-Romanesque ciborium, from Italy.

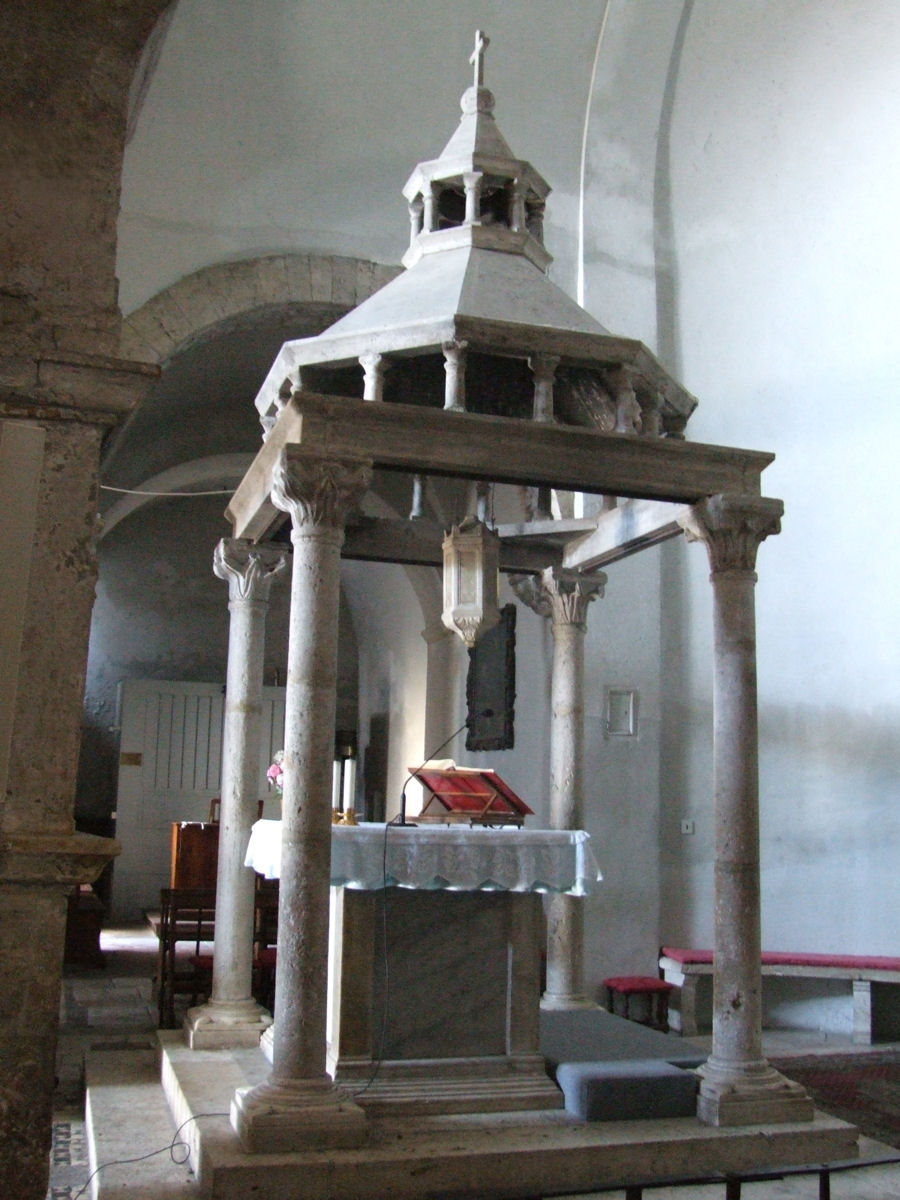
Santa Maria Assunta
Lugnano in Teverina
Italy, by the Cosmati

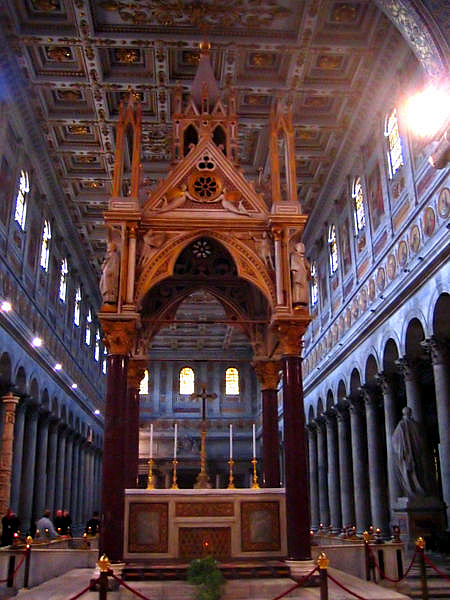
San Paolo Fuori le Mura, Rome

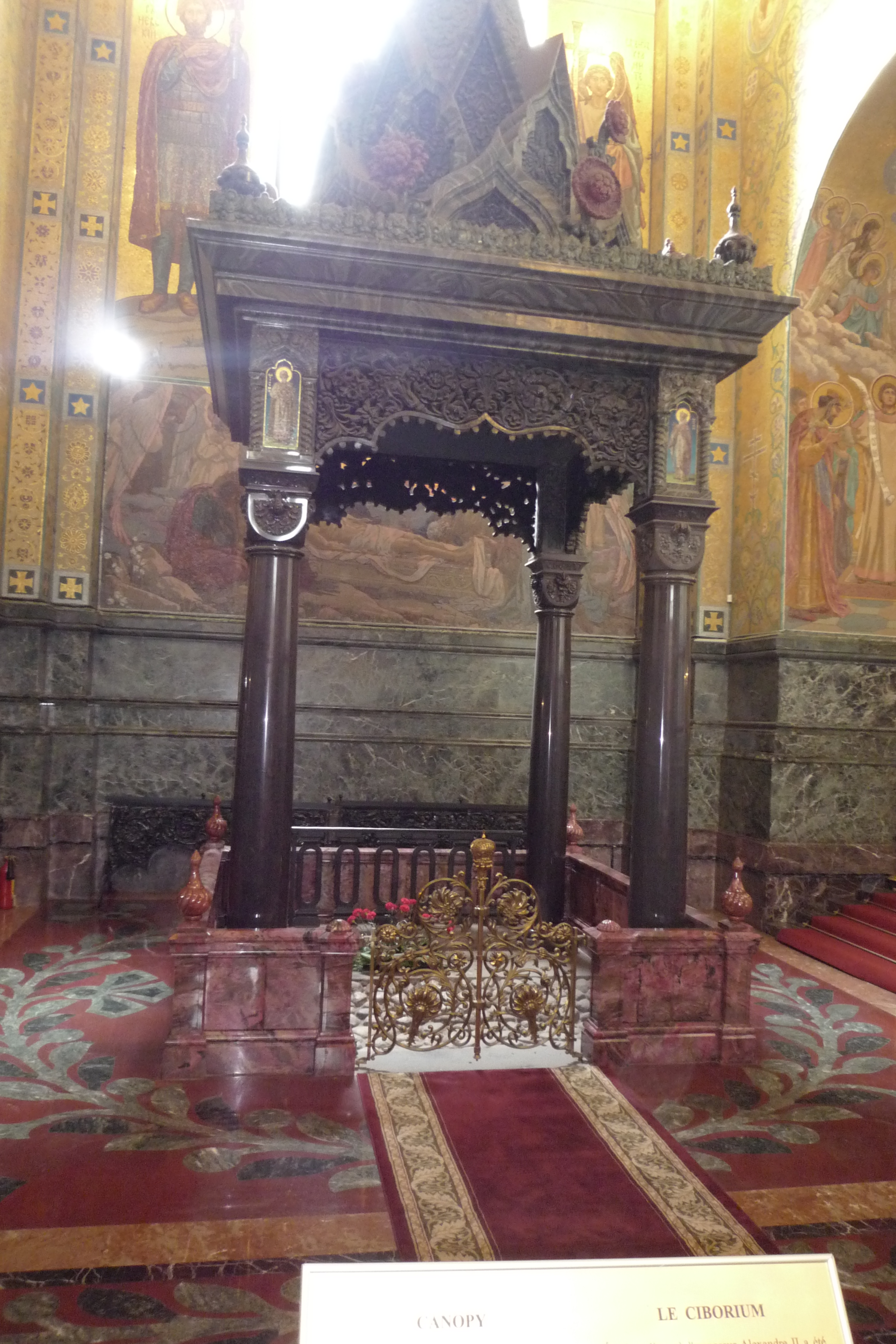
Church of the Saviour on the Blood, St. Petersburg

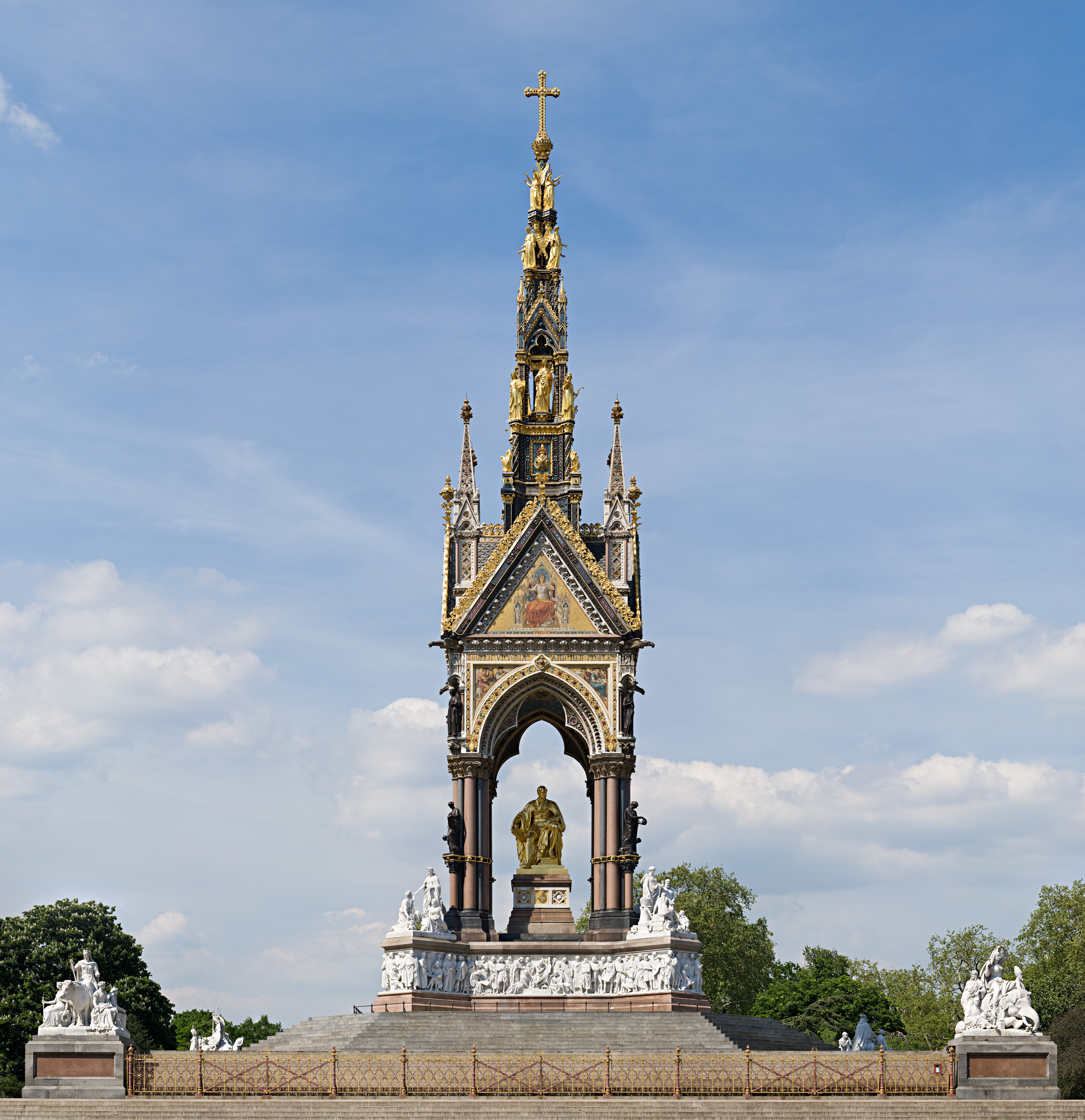
Albert Memorial, London

== See also ==
- Gazebo
- Aedicule: often not free-standing
- Monopteros
- Symbolism of domes
