= St. Peter's Baldachin =

Monument by Gianlorenzo Bernini

- Baldacchino di San Pietro (Italian)
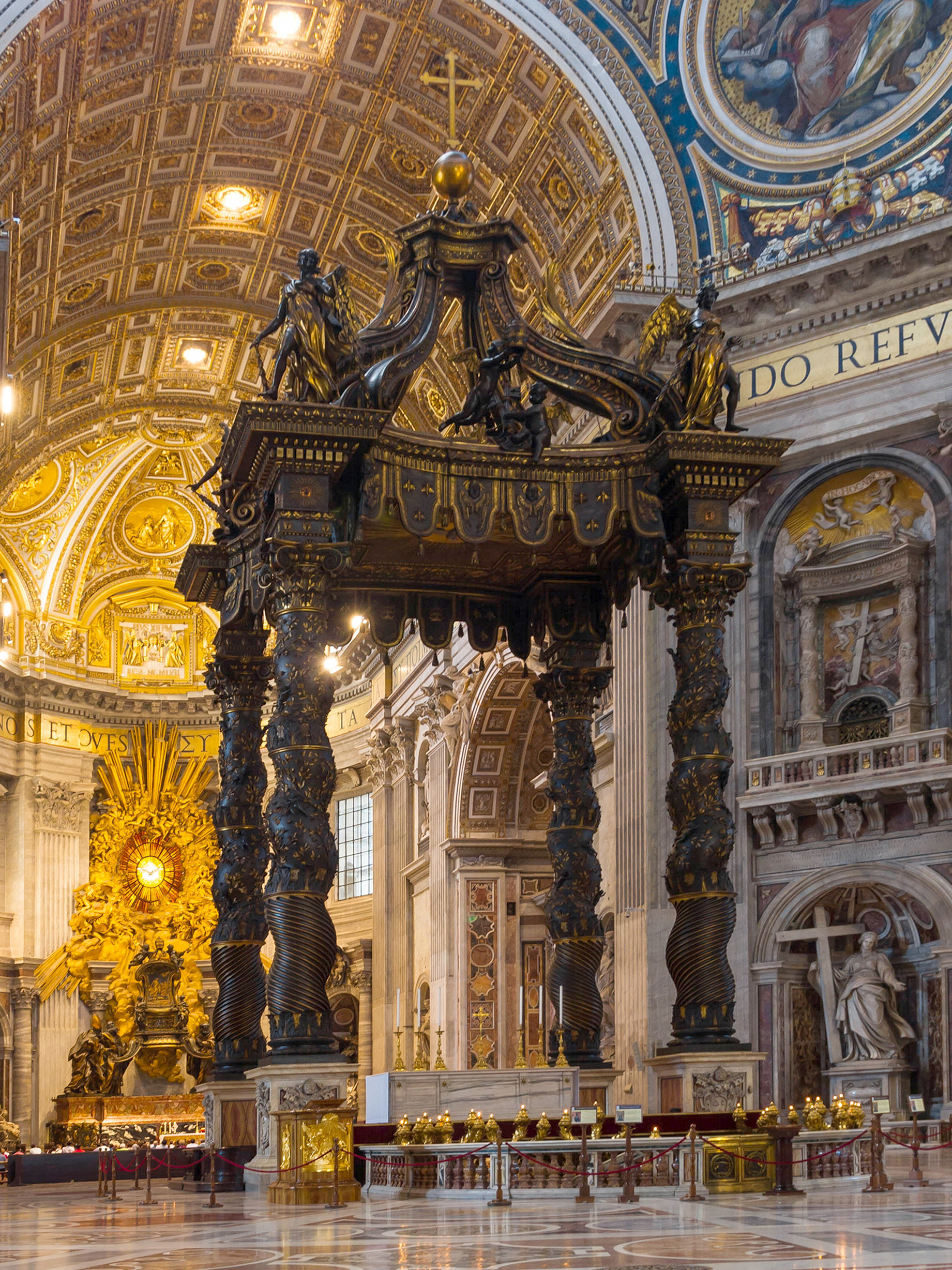
- Artist: Gian Lorenzo Bernini
- Year: 1623–1634
- Catalogue: 21
- Type: Sculpture
- Medium: Bronze
- Dimensions: 28.74 m (94.3 ft)
- Location: St. Peter's Basilica, Vatican City; 41°54′8″N 12°27′12″E
- Preceded by: Bust of Antonio Cepparelli
- Followed by: Bust of Cardinal Melchior Klesl

St. Peter's Baldachin (Italian: Baldacchino di San Pietro, L'Altare di Bernini) is a large Baroque sculpted bronze canopy, technically called a ciborium or baldachin, over the high altar of St. Peter's Basilica in Vatican City, the city-state and papal enclave surrounded by Rome, Italy. The baldachin is at the center of the crossing, and directly under the dome of the basilica. Designed by the Italian artist Gian Lorenzo Bernini, it was intended to mark, in a monumental way, the place of Saint Peter's tomb underneath. Under its canopy is the high altar of the basilica. Commissioned by Pope Urban VIII, the work began in 1623 and ended in 1634. The baldachin acts as a visual focus within the basilica; it is itself a very large structure and forms a visual mediation between the enormous scale of the building and the human scale of the people officiating at the religious ceremonies at the papal altar beneath its canopy.

== Context ==
The form of the structure is an updating in Baroque style of the traditional ciborium or architectural pavilion found over the altars of many important churches, and ceremonial canopies used to frame the numinous or mark a sacred spot. Old St. Peter's Basilica had a ciborium, like most major basilicas in Rome, and Bernini's predecessor, Carlo Maderno, had produced a design, also with twisted Solomonic columns, less than a decade before. It may more specifically allude to features drawn from the funerary catafalque and thus appropriate to Saint Peter, and from the traditional cloth canopy known as a baldacchino that was carried above the head of the pope on Holy Days and therefore related to the reigning pope as the successor of Saint Peter. The idea of the baldachin to mark Saint Peter's tomb was not Bernini's idea and there had been various columnar structures erected earlier.

The old basilica had a screen in front of the altar, supported by 2nd century Solomonic columns that had been brought "from Greece" by Constantine I (and which are indeed of Greek marble). These were by the Middle Ages believed to have come from the Temple of Jerusalem and had given the rare classical Solomonic form of helical column both its name and considerable prestige for the most sacred of sites. Eight of the original twelve columns are now found in pairs halfway up the piers on either side of the baldachin.

== Description and history ==
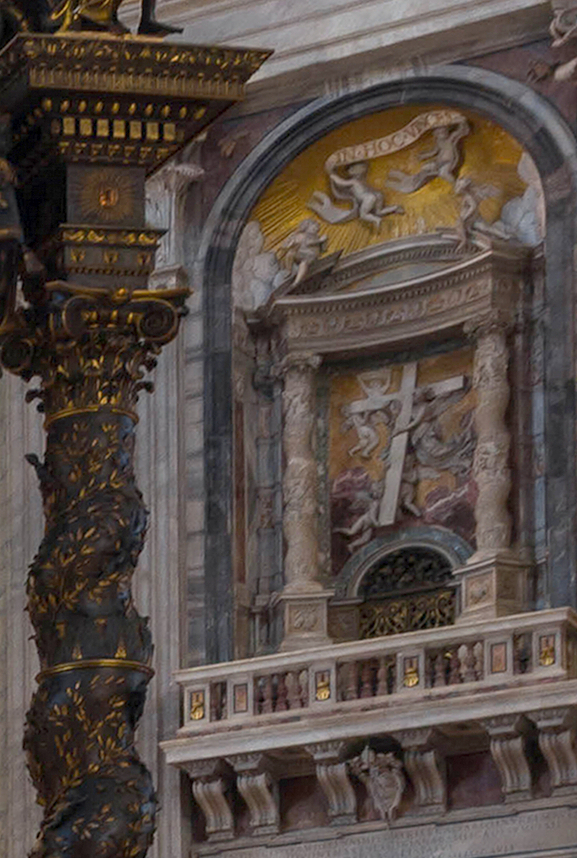
At right, two of the Solomonic columns brought to Rome by Constantine, in their present-day location on a pier in St. Peter's Basilica. In the foreground at left is part of Bernini's Baldacchino, inspired by the original columns.

The bronze and gilded baldachin was the first of Bernini's works to combine sculpture and architecture and represents an important development in Baroque church interior design and furnishing. The canopy rests upon four helical columns each of which stands on a high marble plinth. The columns support a cornice which curves inwards in the middle of each side. Above this, four twice-life-size angels stand at the corners behind whom four large volutes rise up to a second smaller cornice which in turn supports the gilded cross on a sphere, a symbol of the world redeemed by Christianity.

The four columns are 20 metres or 66 feet high. The base and capital were cast separately and the shaft of each column was cast in three sections. Their helical form was derived from the smaller marble helical columns once thought to have been brought to Rome by the Emperor Constantine from Solomon's Temple in Jerusalem and which were used in the Old Saint Peter's Basilica (See the article Solomonic column). From the cornice hangs a bronze semblance of the scalloped and tasselled border that typically trimmed the papal baldacchino. The structure is decorated with detailed motifs including heraldic emblems of the Barberini family (Urban VIII was born Maffeo Barberini) such as bees and laurel leaves. (Note: The decoration on the ancient Solomonic columns in St. Peter's was originally of vine leaves, but on the baldachin these were replaced by laurel. The use of the laurel may be a reference to the poetic abilities of Urban VIII who was a skilled writer of Latin verse.) The underside of the canopy and directly above the officiating pope is a radiant sun – another emblem of the Barberini.

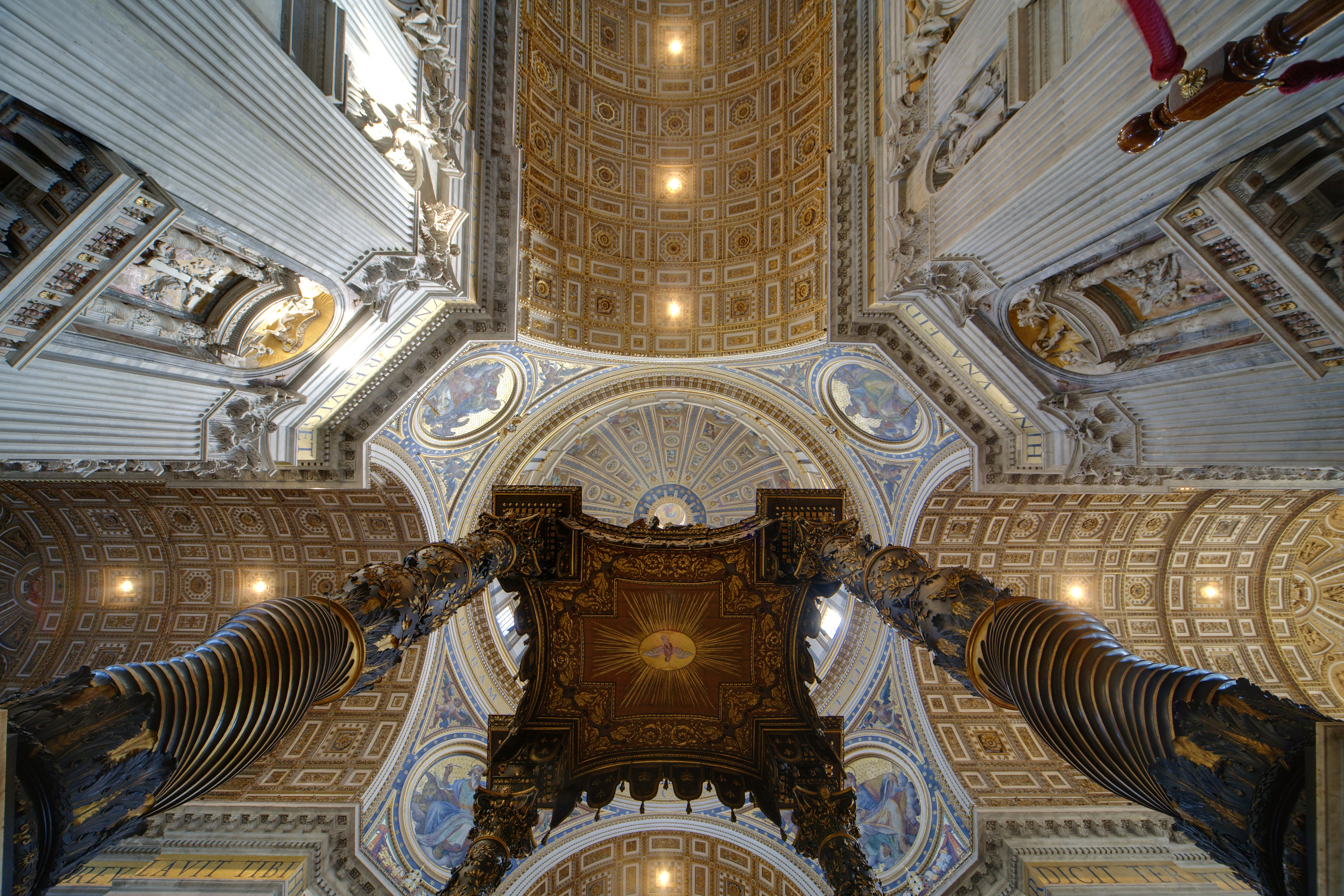
The view from beneath the baldachin, showing the Holy Spirit within a radiant sunburst

The source of the bronze to make the structure was an issue of contemporary controversy as it was believed to have been taken from the roof or portico ceiling of the ancient Roman Pantheon, though Urban's accounts say that about ninety percent of the bronze from the Pantheon was used for a cannon, and that the bronze for the baldachin came from Venice. A well-known satirical lampoon left attached to the ancient 'speaking' statue of Pasquino on a corner of the Piazza Navona, said: Quod non fecerunt barbari, fecerunt Barberini or "What the barbarians did not do, the Barberini did".

At this early stage in their careers, and before the bitter rivalry between the two ensued, Bernini worked in collaboration with Francesco Borromini who made drawings of the structure and who may also have contributed to its design. Various other artistic colleagues were also involved including his father Pietro Bernini, his brother Luigi Bernini, Stefano Maderno, François Duquesnoy, Andrea Bolgi and Giuliano Finelli who contributed to the sculptural decoration.

There remained an issue that Bernini was not to resolve until later in his career. In a Latin cross church, the high altar should be placed in the chancel at the end of the longitudinal axis and yet in St. Peter's it was located in the centre of the crossing. Bernini sought a solution whereby the high altar above the tomb of the first Pope of the Catholic Church could be reconciled with tradition. With his design for the Cathedra Petri or Chair of Saint Peter (1657–66) at the apsidal end of the chancel, Bernini completed his visual concetto or design idea; the congregation had a perspectivised view down the nave to the image framed by the baldachin which compressed the distance between the crossing and the Chair of Saint Peter in the chancel, reconciling the Prince of the Apostles' tomb, his implied presence on the chair and his legitimate successor officiating at the ceremonies.

=== Plinths and the Barberini coats of arms ===
The coat of arms of the House of Barberini

Four marble plinths form the basis of the columns that support the baldachin. The two outer sides of each plinth are decorated with the Barberini family's coat of arms. This series of eight, nearly identical coats of arms forms a narrative that has attracted over the centuries the interest of writers and art historians.

The coat of arms itself represents the three bees of the Barberini family. Each shield is enclosed by a woman's head at the top and by the head of a satyr at the bottom. A papal tiara with crossed keys surmounts the shield. All shields look nearly identical, but – if examined one after another starting with the left-hand front plinth – they reveal dramatic changes in the expression on the female face. The coat of arms itself, flat on the first plinth, undergoes a noticeable deformation, progressively bulging up to the sixth shield and flattening again on the last two shields. Above the eighth shield, the female face is replaced by the head of a winged child or putto. The allegory behind the coats of arms is universally interpreted as representing the various stages of childbirth. As Witkowski writes:

The scene begins on the face of the left-hand front plinth; the woman's face begins to contract; on the second and following plinths the features pass through a series of increasingly violent convulsions. Simultaneously, the hair becomes increasingly dishevelled; the eyes, which at first express a bearable degree of suffering, take on a haggard look; the mouth, closed at first, opens, then screams with piercing realism. ... Finally, comes the delivery: the belly subsides and the mother's head disappears, to give way to a cherubic baby's head with curly hair, smiling beneath the unchanging pontifical insignia.

Several explanations have been put forward for this unusually explicit allegory displayed in the most sacred place of Roman Catholic Christianity (the burial place of Saint Peter). Some scholars favor a symbolic explanation, suggesting that Bernini intended to represent the labor of the papacy and of the earthly church through the allegory of a woman's pregnancy. A more popular tradition tells the story of the complicated pregnancy of a niece of Urban VIII's and of his vow to dedicate an altar in St. Peter's to a successful delivery. A third tradition explains the allegory as Bernini's revenge against the pope's decision to disavow a child illegally born to his nephew Taddeo Barberini and the sister of one of Bernini's pupils.

The childbirth sequence in Bernini's plinths was praised, among others, by director Sergei Eisenstein, who in a piece titled Montage and Architecture written in the late 1930s describes it as "one of the most spectacular compositions of that great master Bernini", with the coats of arms as "eight shots, eight montage sequences of a whole montage scenario."

== See also ==
- List of works by Gian Lorenzo Bernini
- Index of Vatican City-related articles
