= Two Angels in Sant'Agostino =

Sculptures by Gianlorenzo Bernini

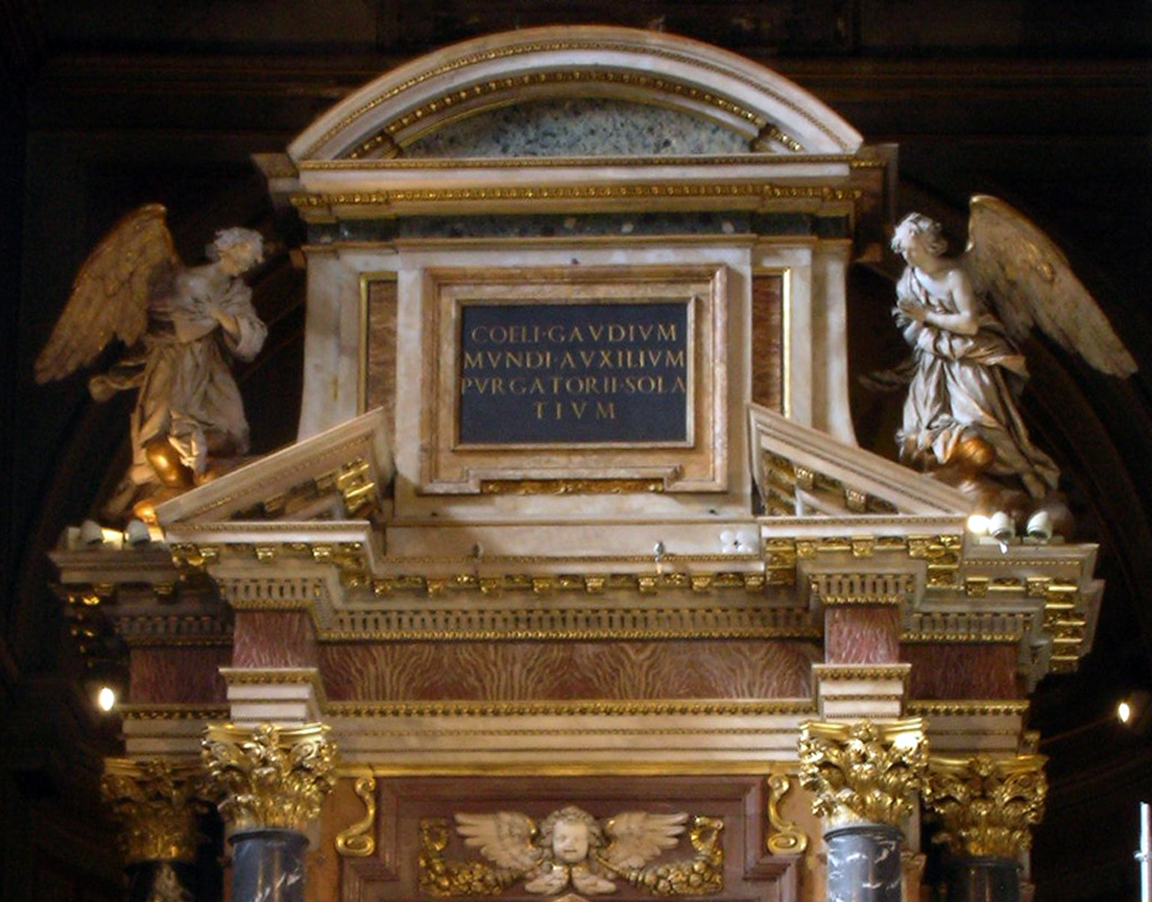
- Artist: Gian Lorenzo Bernini
- Year: 1626–1628
- Catalogue: 23
- Type: Sculpture
- Medium: Marble
- Location: Basilica of Sant'Agostino, Rome; 41°54′03″N 12°28′27″E
- Preceded by: Bust of Cardinal Melchior Klesl
- Followed by: Bust of Francesco Barberini

Two Angels in Sant'Agostino are two marble sculptures above the high altar of the Basilica of Sant'Agostino in Rome. They are listed as being by the Italian artist Gian Lorenzo Bernini in the biography of Baldinucci, and there is also recorded evidence of Bernini having been paid for them. However, it seems likely that Bernini passed the work over to one of his assistants, Giuliano Finelli.

One of the bozzetti (preparatory works in terracotta) is in the Ringling Museum, Sarasota, in the USA. It was verified as a Bernini by art historian Rudolf Wittkower and purchased for US$5,880 by the museum in 1961; a fact corroborated in newspaper reports of the time. However, the museum's current attribution lists the sculpture as a design by Bernini executed by Giuliano Finelli.

== See also ==
- List of works by Gian Lorenzo Bernini
