= Dossal =

Ornamental cloth or panel hung behind an altar

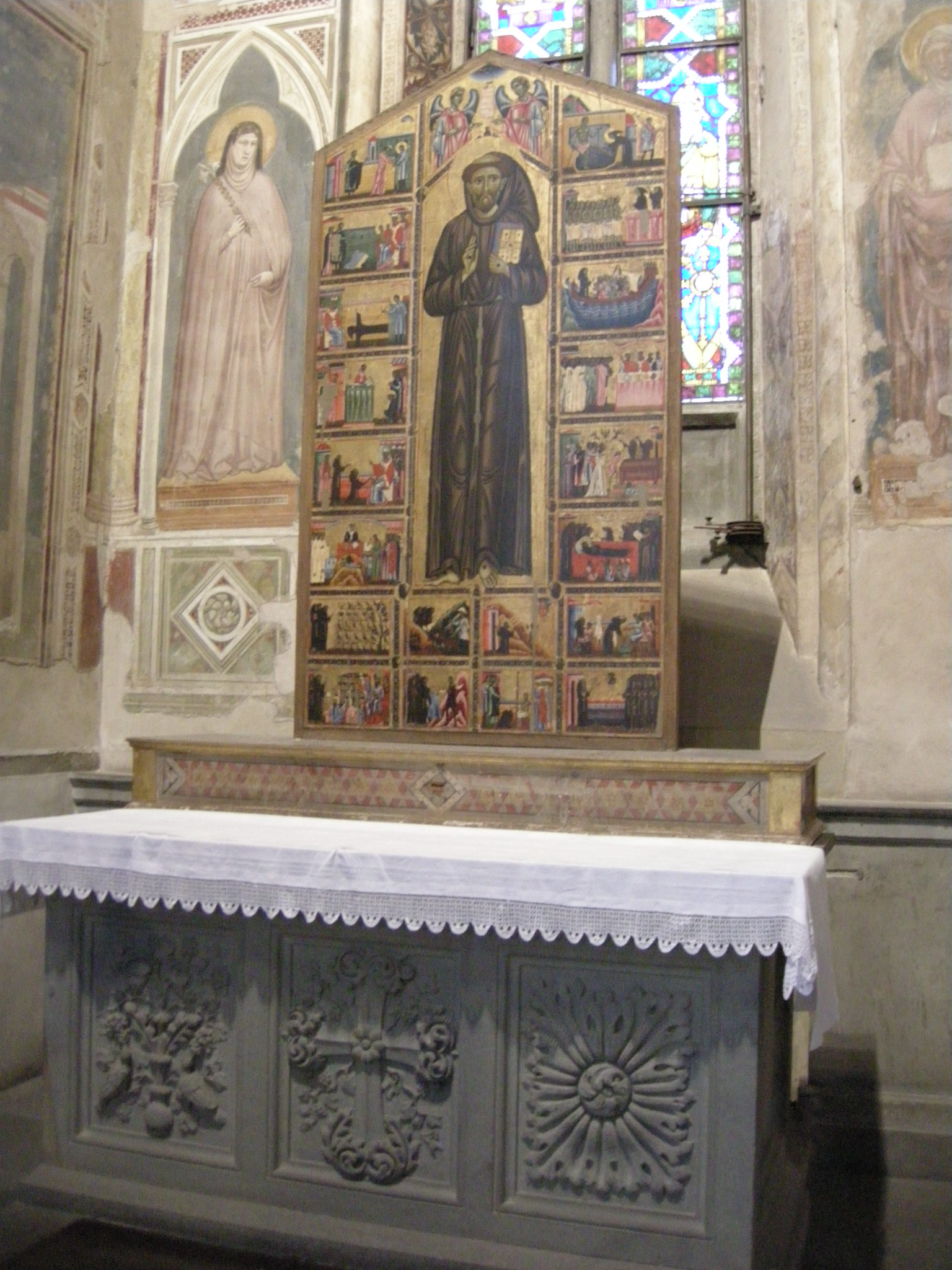
The "Bardi Dossal" in the Bardi Chapel of Santa Croce, Florence. This is usually so called, but is an altarpiece and might also be called a retable or reredos. The shelf it rises from is a gradine.

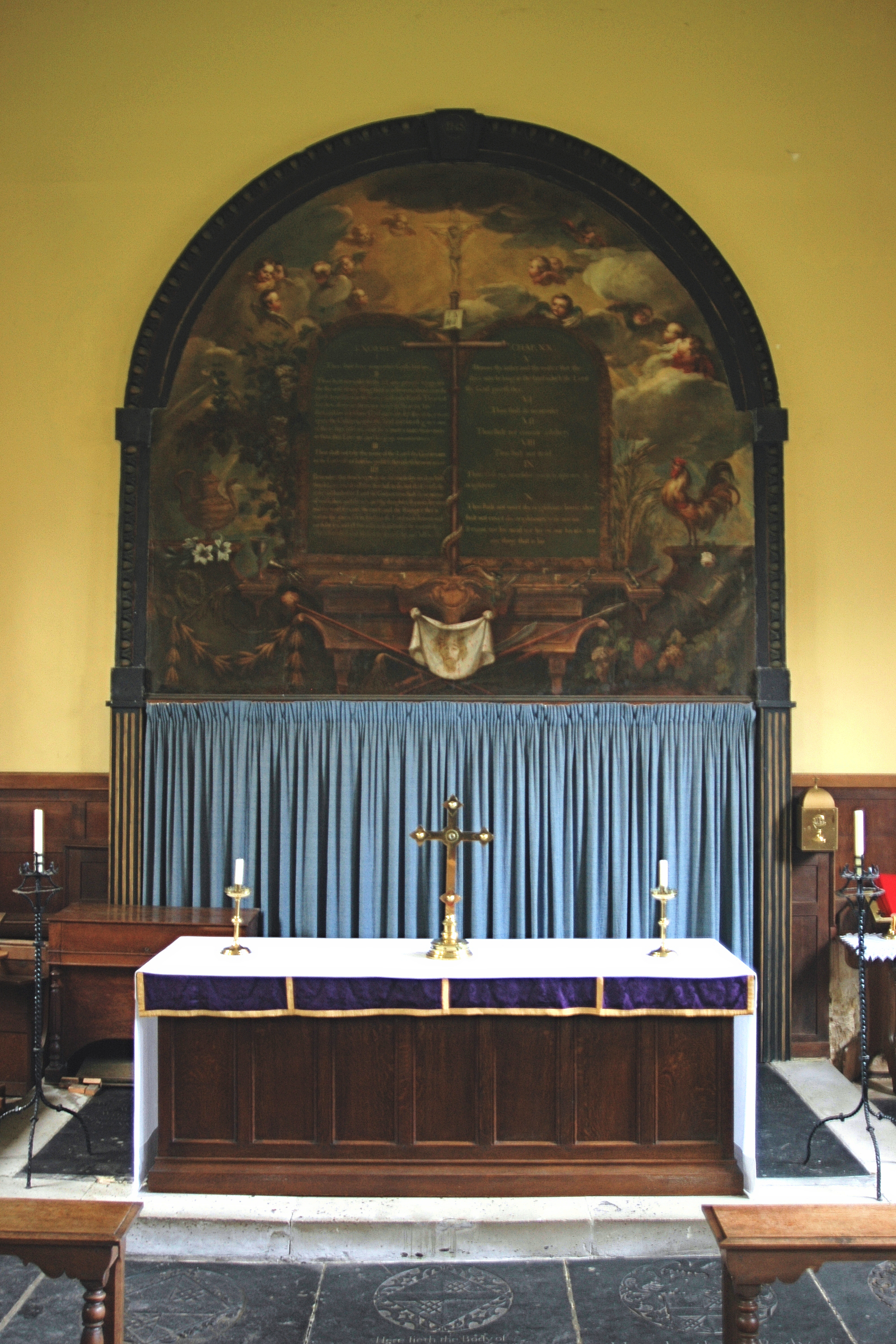
Dossal curtain, below a painted altarpiece, Weston-on-the-Green, Oxfordshire

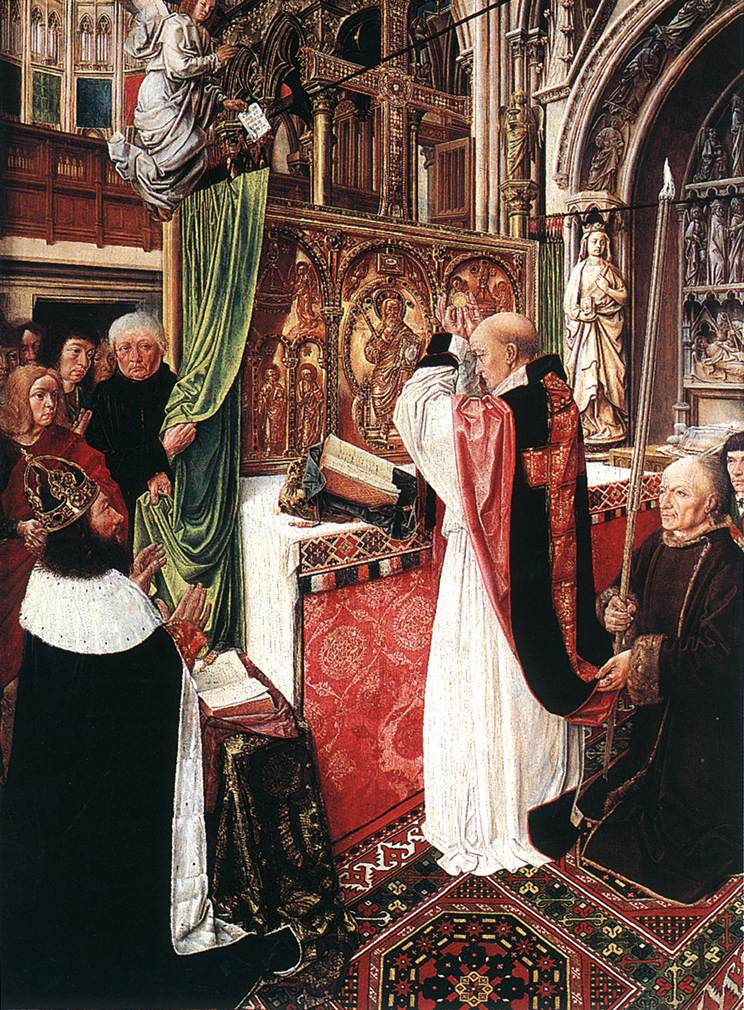
Green riddel curtains, with a metalwork dossal, in the Mass of St Gilles by the Master of Saint Giles

A dossal (or dossel, dorsel, dosel), from French dos (back), is one of a number of terms for something rising from the back of a church altar. In modern usage, it primarily refers to cloth hangings but it can also denote a board, often carved or containing a painting, that rises vertically from the back of the altar and to which the cloth is attached. Retable and reredos are alternative terms for solid structures, as is altarpiece, all of them rather more commonly used today.

Dossal remains the usual term for an ornamental cloth suspended behind an altar, probably attached to the wall behind. This is often called a dossal curtain, and altar screen is also sometimes used as a synonym for a cloth dossal, as well as, more dubiously, for wood or stone screens in various locations in the sanctuary. Curtains at the side of an altar may be called riddels; these may be suspended between riddel posts at the corners of the altar. More rarely, a cloth dossal may continue as a horizontal "tester" hanging immediately over the altar, giving the cloth of honour configuration typical for enthroned monarchs and others in the Middle Ages, and often seen in medieval and Renaissance paintings of the Virgin Mary in particular. "Dossal" may also be used for a secular vertical cloth of honour, or the vertical part of one.

A refinement of the definition of a painted dossal is that it could be easily detached and fitted between poles (or some similar arrangement), and was carried in processions on particular feast-days. This definition is especially found relating to medieval Italy, and the Franciscans, who are thought to have begun this practice, commissioning Berlinghiero Berlinghieri soon after St Francis' canonization in 1228. The Bardi Dossal illustrated is such a piece, typical in that it shows a saint, here Saint Francis of Assisi, as the main image, surrounded by scenes from his life. In a larger altarpiece, these would be predella scenes running below the main painting. However, dossal is used of some large polyptychs which could not be taken on procession in this way. In academic art history, "dossal" is today only likely to be used for such paintings, or the textiles.

Cloth dossals rarely achieve much individual notability, but the "Lanercost Dossal" at Lanercost Priory, Cumbria, was specially designed by William Morris and embroidered by local ladies. It is 24 feet wide, in "worsted wools on a felted ground". In 2012 it was removed for restoration, which was completed in 2014.

== See also ==
- Rood screen – Partition found in medieval church architecture
