= Bust of Francesco Barberini =

Sculpture by Gian Lorenzo Bernini

Monsignor Francesco Barberini
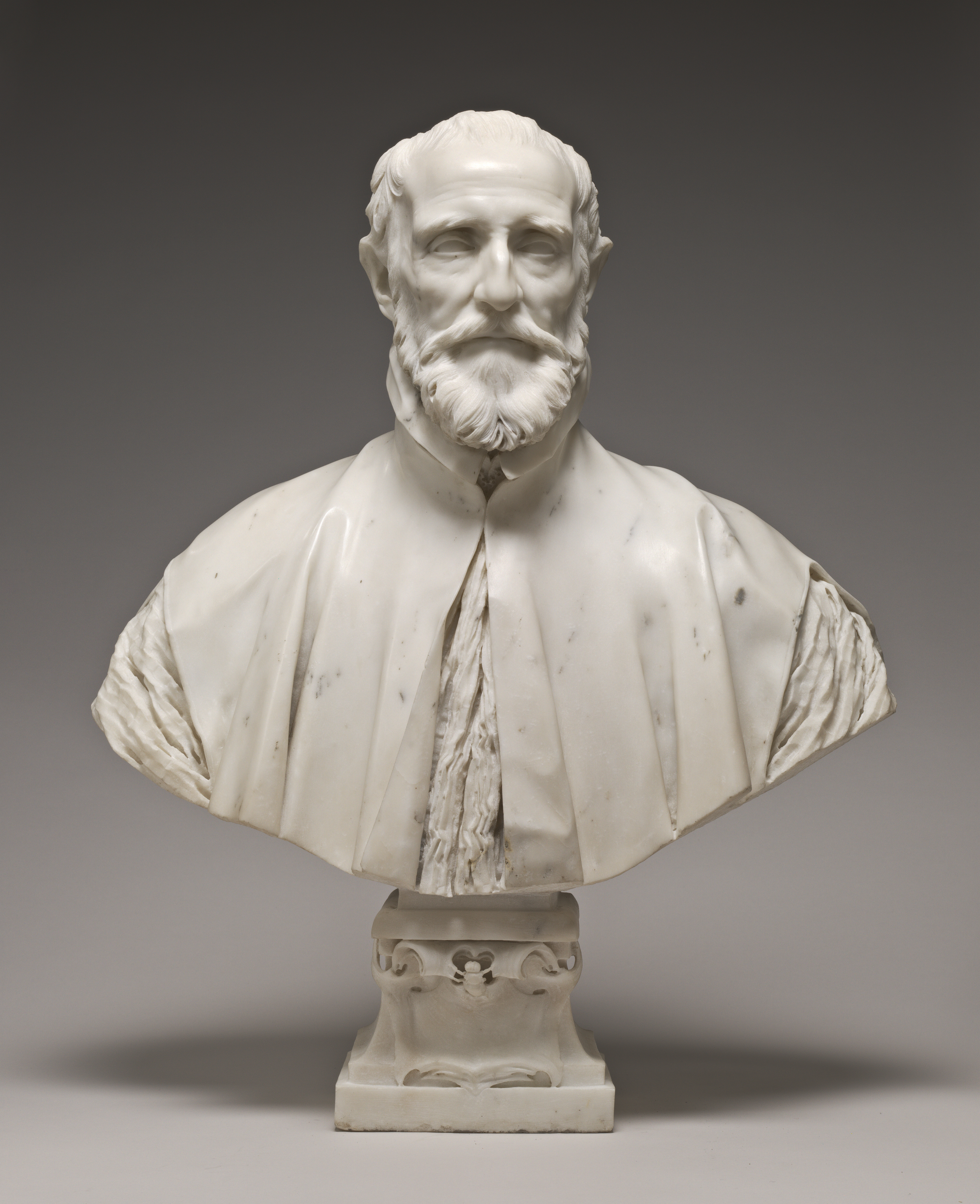
- Artist: Gian Lorenzo Bernini
- Year: 1623
- Catalogue: 24 (a)
- Type: Sculpture
- Medium: Marble
- Dimensions: 80 cm (31 in)
- Location: National Gallery of Art, Washington, D.C.; 38.89147°N 77.02001°W
- Accession: 1961.9.102
- Preceded by: Two Angels in Sant'Agostino
- Followed by: Bust of Camilla Barbadoni

The Bust of Francesco Barberini is a marble sculpture by the Italian artist Gian Lorenzo Bernini, now in the National Gallery of Art in Washington, D.C. It was executed in 1623. It was commissioned by Pope Urban VIII, who was a nephew of Francesco Barberini, an apostolic protonotary. Francesco had died in 1600, so Bernini created the bust from an existing painted portrait. That portrait is in the Corsini Collection in Florence; Bernini made close use of the design, although the painting was a three-quarter portrait as opposed to a bust of head, shoulders, and upper body.

== Provenance ==
The sculpture was given to the National Gallery of Art in Washington D.C. in 1961 as part of the Kress Collection donation. The Kress Foundation had bought the sculpture in 1950 from Count Alessandro Contini-Bonacossi, as part of a collection of 125 paintings and the one Bernini sculpture.

== See also ==
- Barberini family
- Francesco Barberini (the subject's great-nephew)
- List of works by Gian Lorenzo Bernini
