= Johann Wenzel Peter =

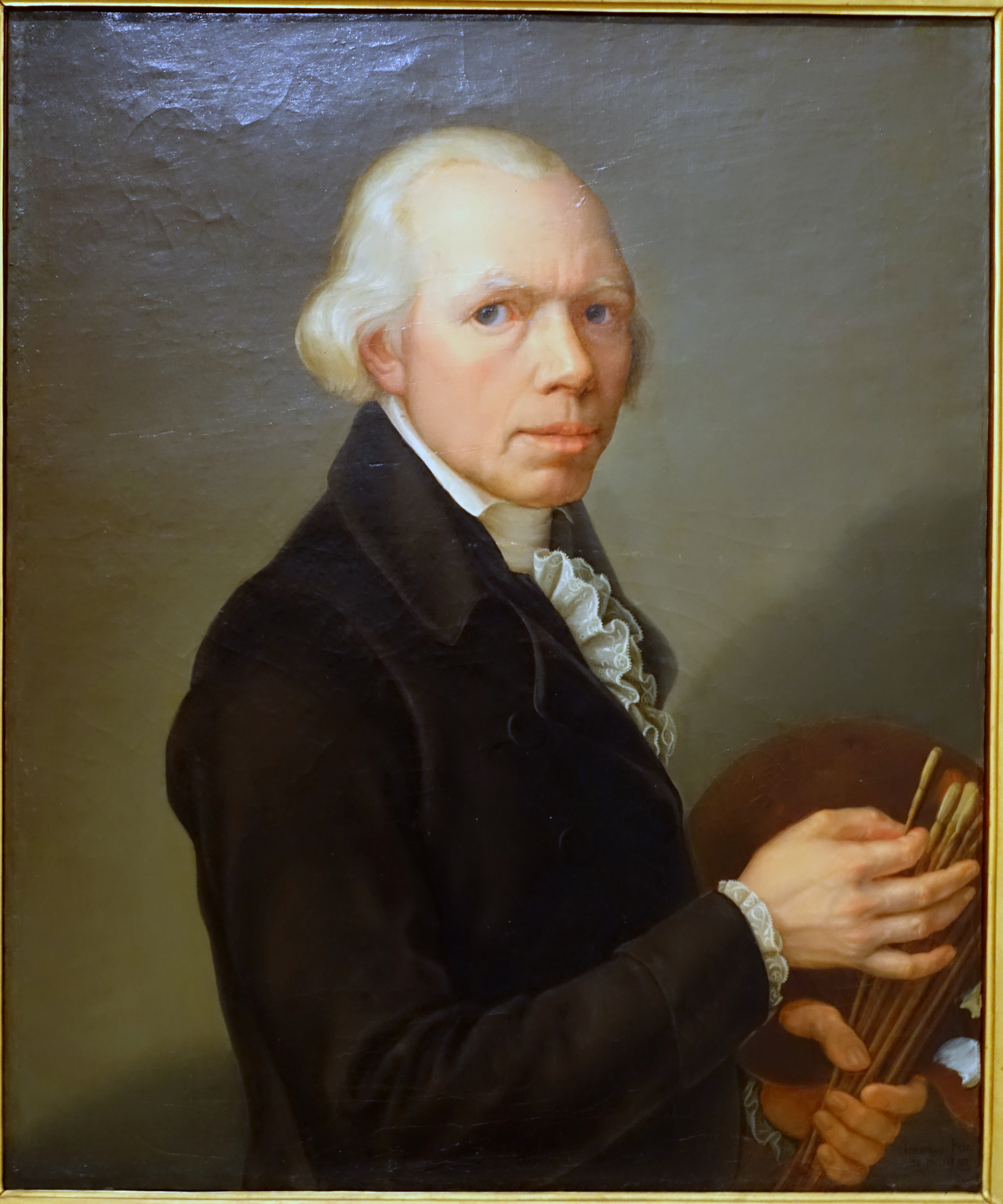
Self portrait, 1813

Johann Wenzel Peter was born September 9, 1745, in Karlsbad in the now-Czech Republic and died December 28, 1829, in Rome, Italy. Peter is known for his animal paintings which appear in the Vatican Museums and frescos which are on the walls of the Galleria Borghese.

Pope Gregory XVI furnished the Room of the Consistory in the Papal State Apartment with twenty works purchased from Peter.

== Highlighted works ==
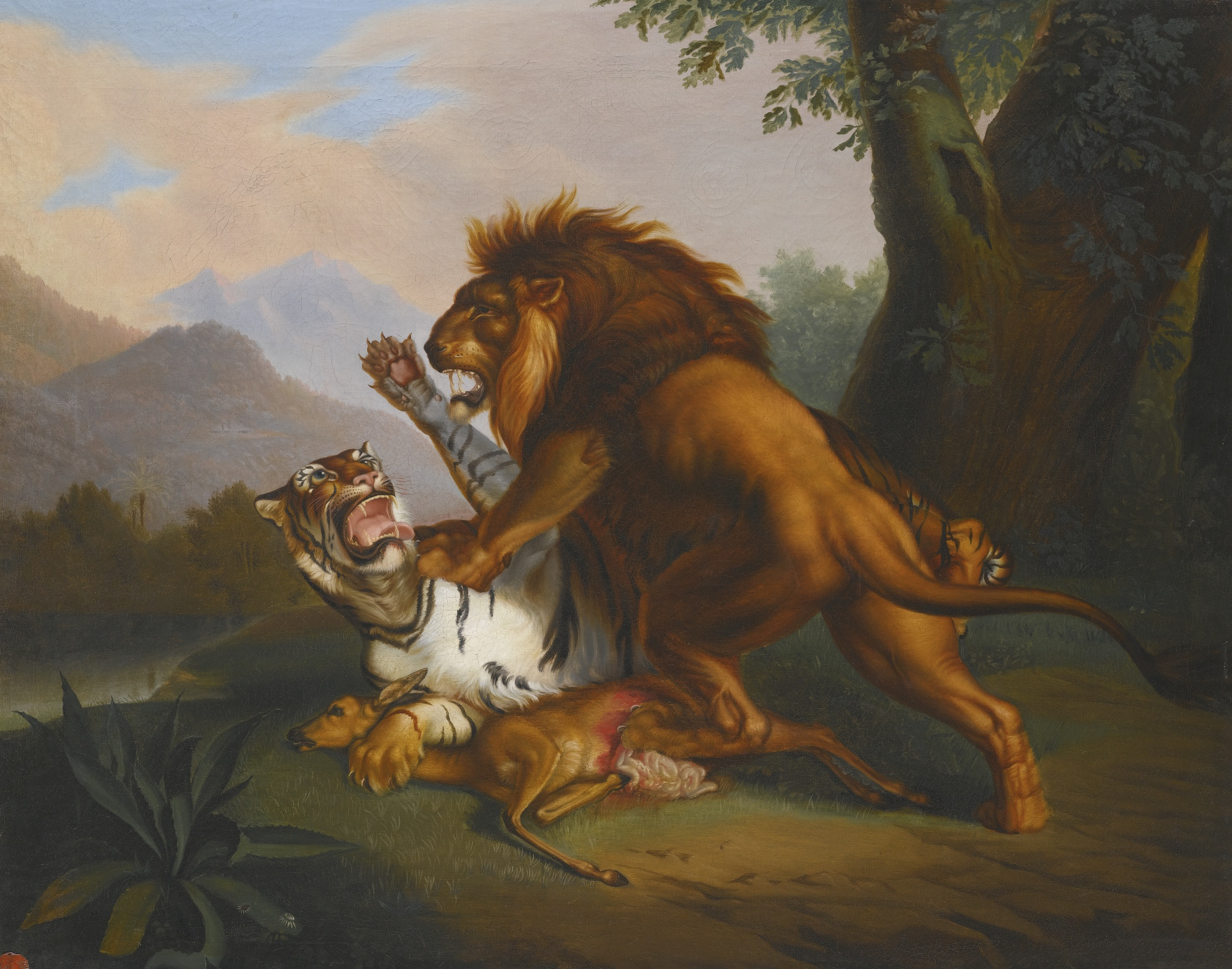
A Lion and Tiger in Combat, c. 1809

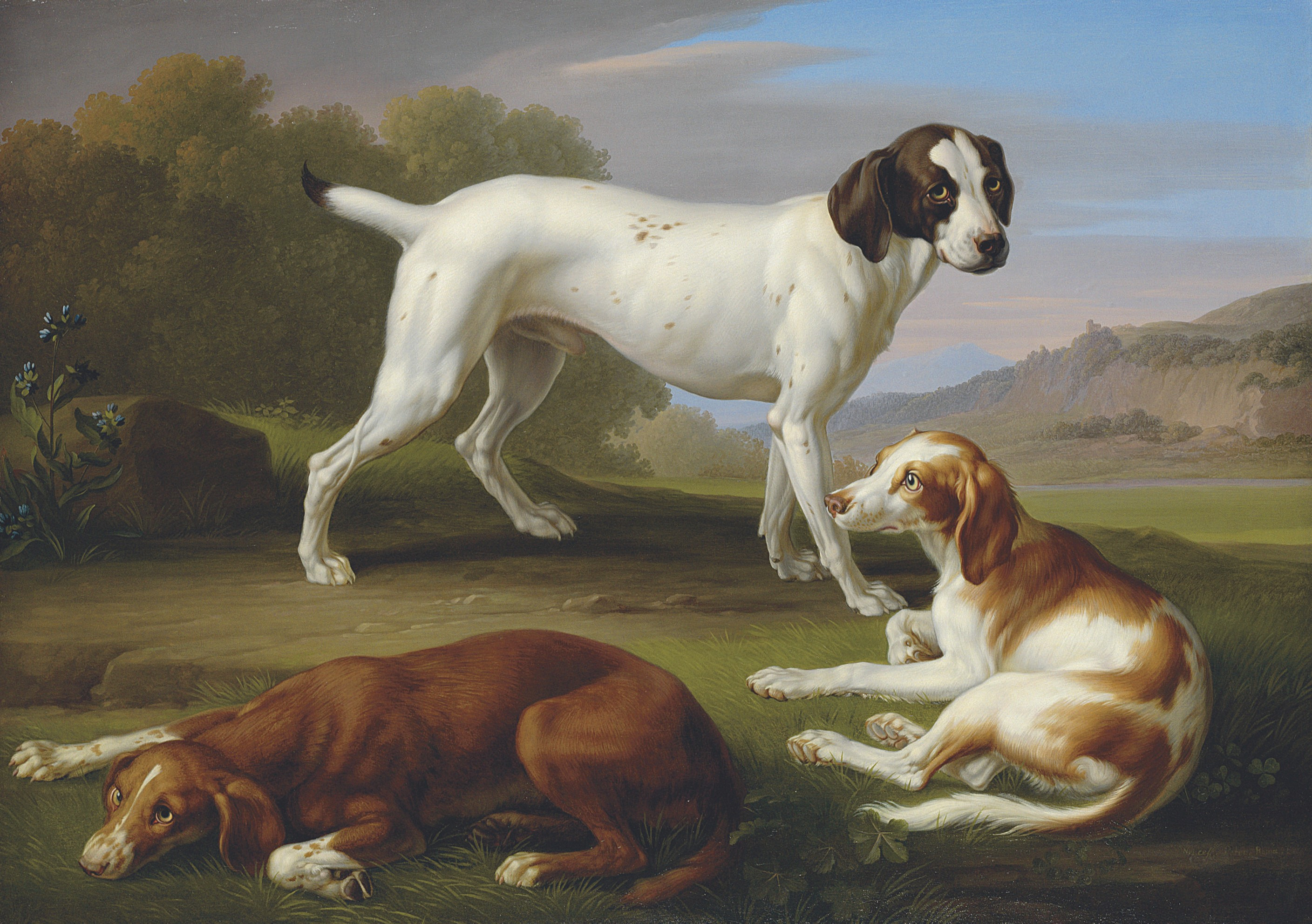
Johann Wenzel Peter - A pointer and two setters in a classical landscape

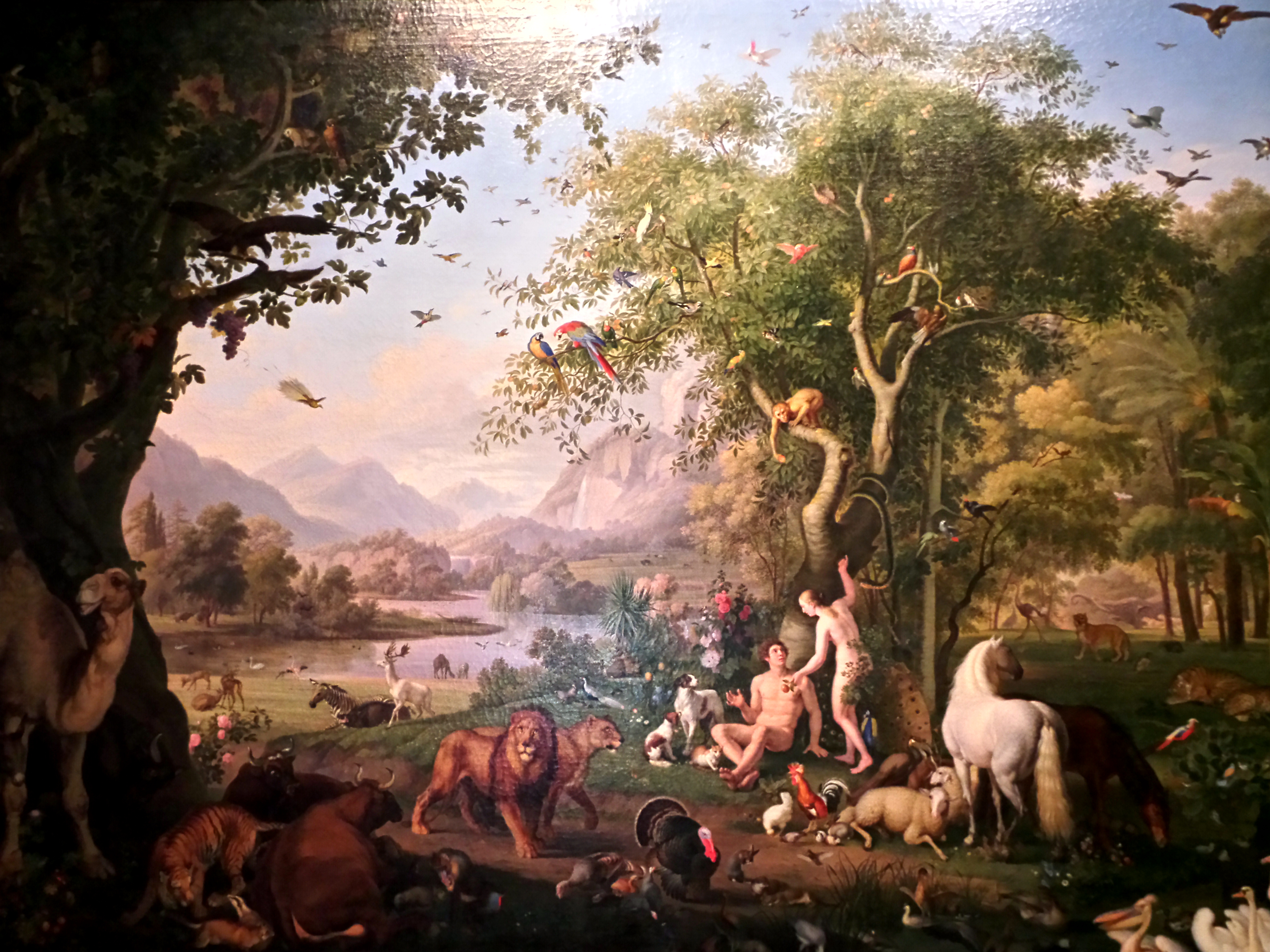
Paradiso terrestre

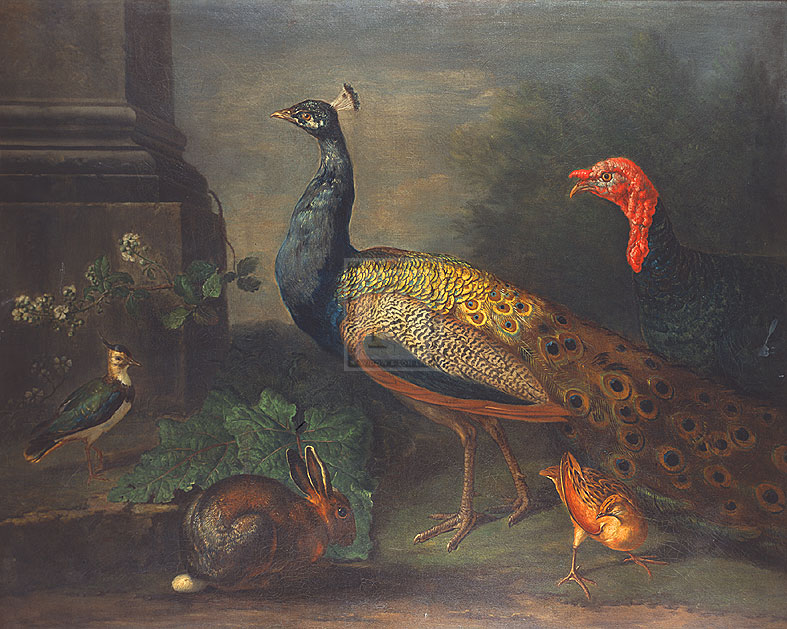
Johann Wenzel Peter - Truthahn, Pfau, Kiebitz, Kaninchen

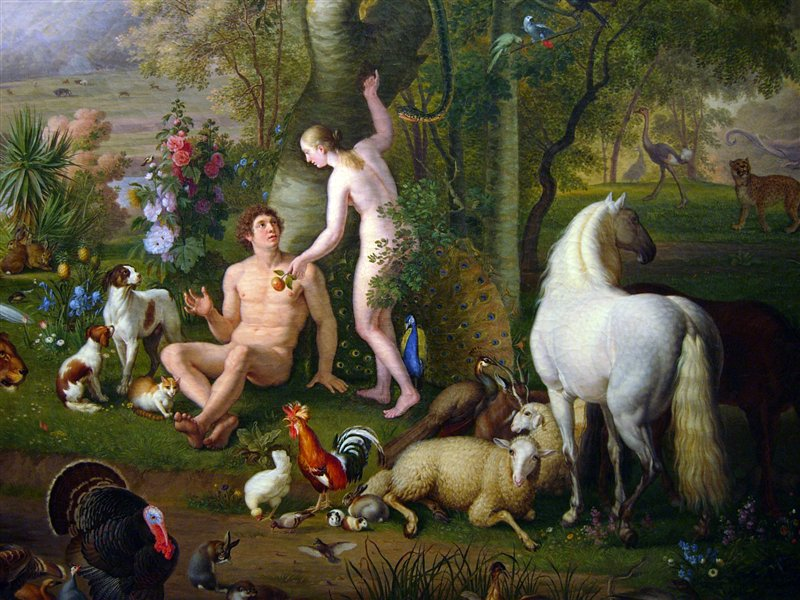
11698 - Vatican - Pinacoteca (3482061955)

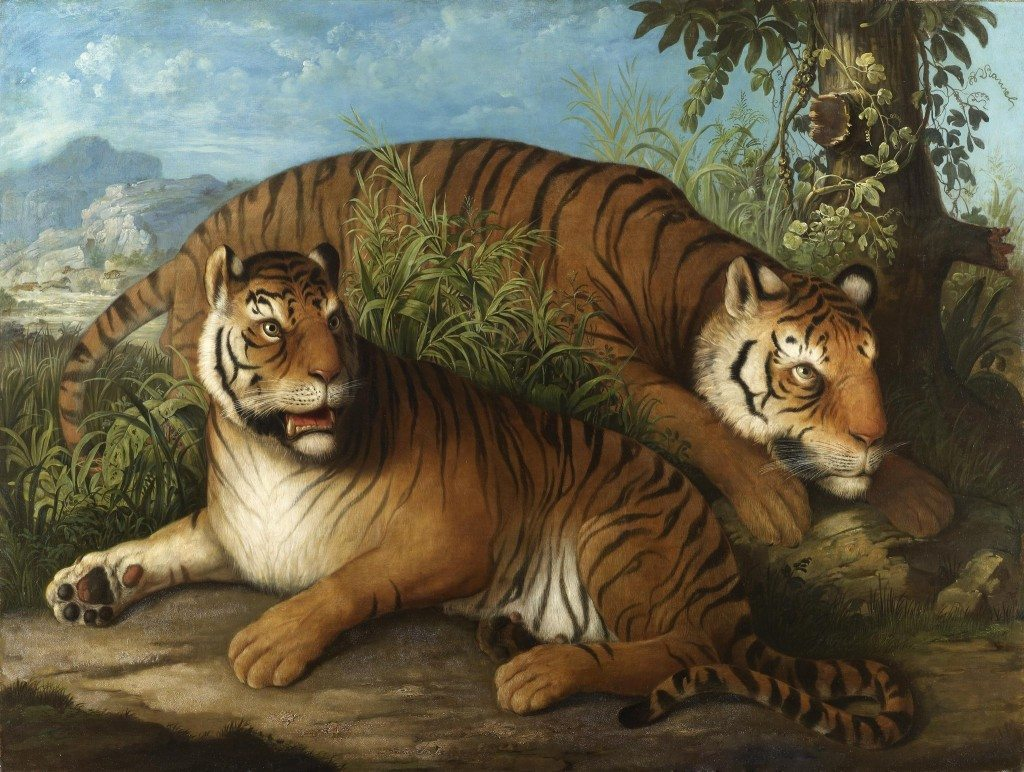
Johann Wenzel Peter - Royal Bengal Tigers

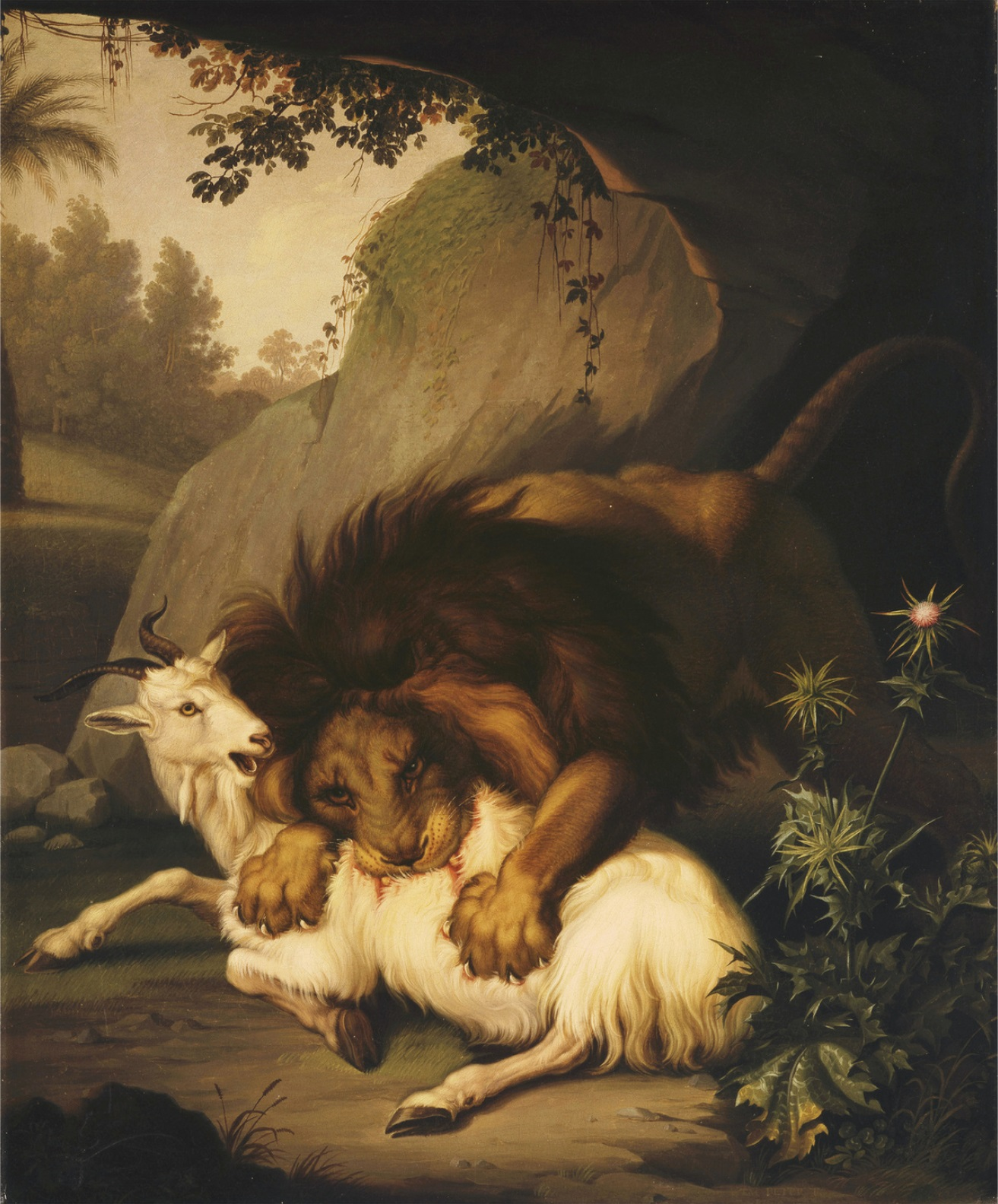
Johann Wenzel Peter - Ein Löwe greift eine Ziege an 1785

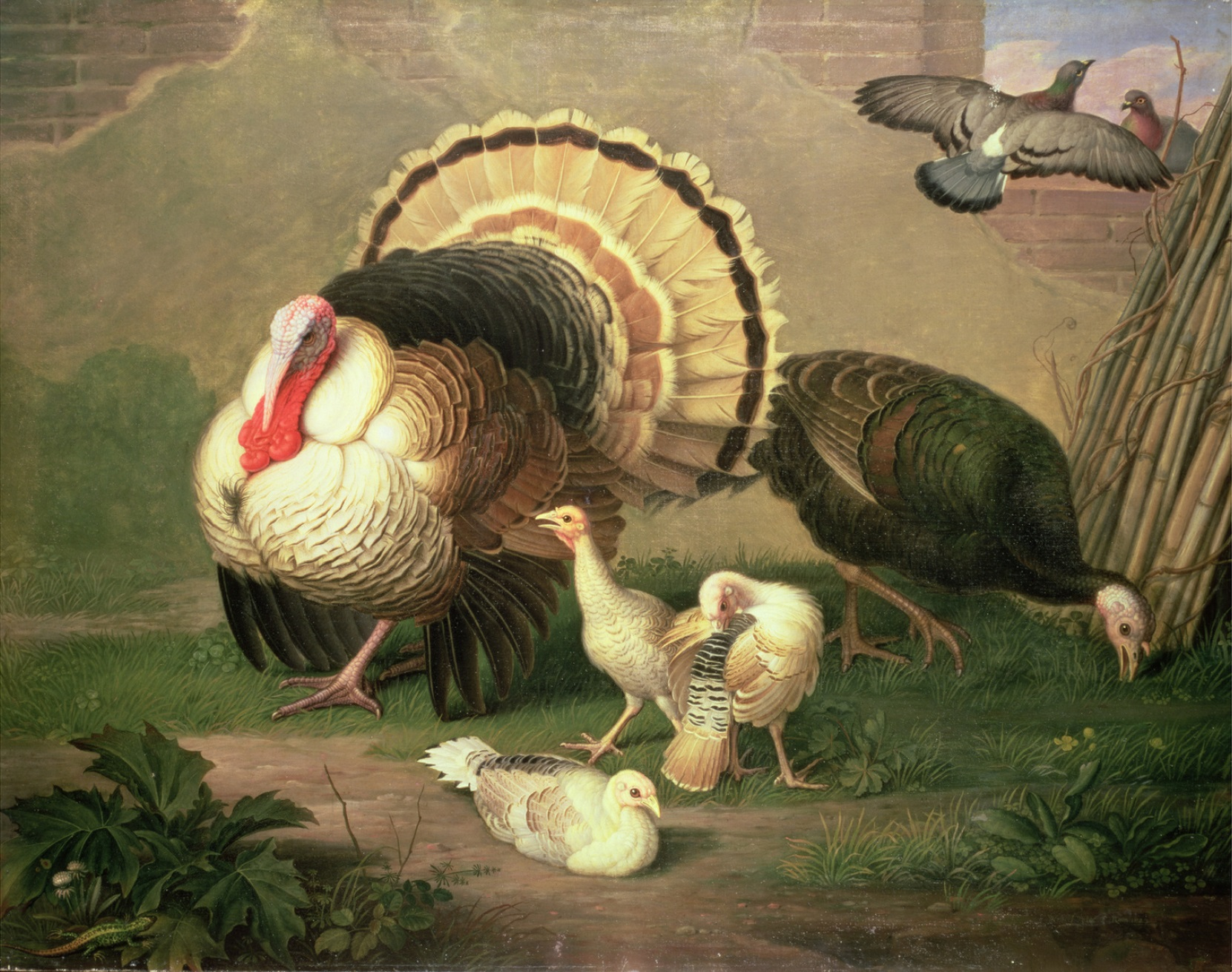
Johann Wenzel Peter - Truthähne

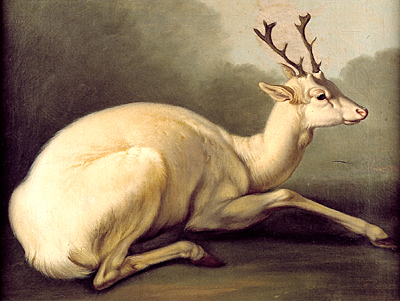
Jan Václav Peter - Jelen
