= Gian Lorenzo Bernini =

Italian sculptor and architect (1598–1680)

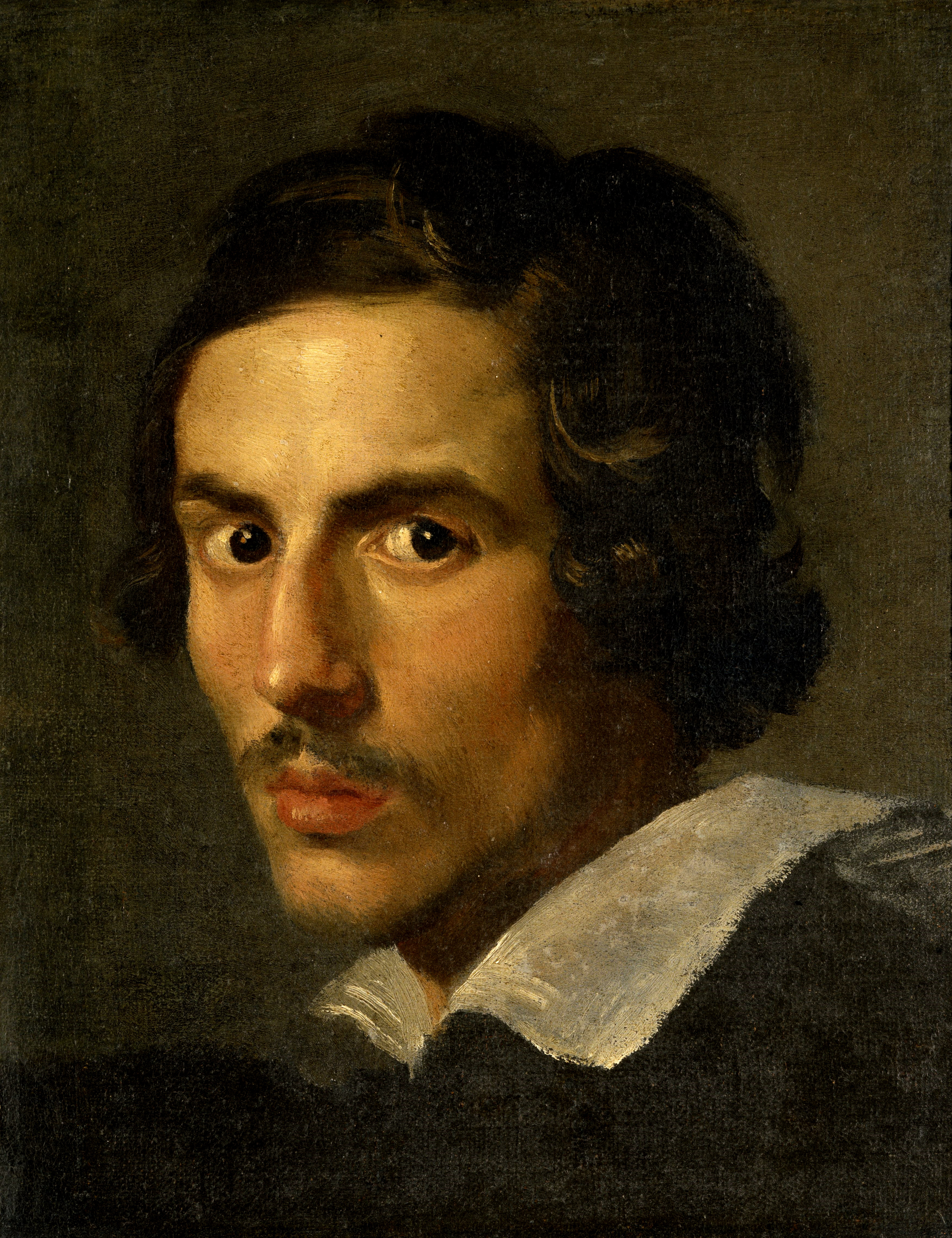
- Self-portrait of Bernini, c. 1623, Galleria Borghese, Rome
- Born: Gian Lorenzo Bernini; 7 December 1598; Naples, Kingdom of Naples
- Died: 28 November 1680 (aged 81); Rome, Papal States
- Known for: Sculpture; painting; architecture
- Notable work: Sleeping Hermaphroditus (1620); The Rape of Proserpina (1621–1622); Apollo and Daphne (1622–1625); David (1623–1624); St. Peter's Baldachin (1623–1634); Ecstasy of Saint Teresa (1647–1652); Fontana dei Quattro Fiumi (1651)
- Movement: Baroque style
- Patron: Cardinal Scipione Borghese

Gian Lorenzo (or Gianlorenzo) Bernini (UK: /bɛərˈniːni/, US: /bərˈ-/; Italian: [ˈdʒan loˈrɛntso berˈniːni]; Italian Giovanni Lorenzo; 7 December 1598 – 28 November 1680) was an Italian sculptor, architect, painter and city planner. Bernini's creative abilities and mastery in a range of artistic arenas define him as an uomo universale or Renaissance man. While a major figure in the world of architecture, he was more prominently the leading sculptor of his age, credited with creating the Baroque style of sculpture.

As one scholar has commented, "What Shakespeare is to drama, Bernini may be to sculpture: the first pan-European sculptor whose name is instantaneously identifiable with a particular manner and vision, and whose influence was inordinately powerful ..." In addition, he was a painter (mostly small canvases in oil) and a man of the theatre: he wrote, directed and acted in plays (mostly Carnival satires), for which he designed stage sets and theatrical machinery. He produced designs as well for a wide variety of decorative art objects, including lamps, tables, mirrors, and even coaches.

As an architect and city planner, he designed secular buildings, churches, chapels, and public squares, as well as massive works combining both architecture and sculpture, especially elaborate public fountains and funerary monuments and a whole series of temporary structures (in stucco and wood) for funerals and festivals. His broad technical versatility, boundless compositional inventiveness and sheer skill in manipulating marble ensured that he would be considered a worthy successor of Michelangelo, far outshining other sculptors of his generation. His talent extended beyond the confines of sculpture to a consideration of the setting in which it would be situated; his ability to synthesize sculpture, painting, and architecture into a coherent conceptual and visual whole has been termed by the late art historian Irving Lavin the "unity of the visual arts".

== Biography ==
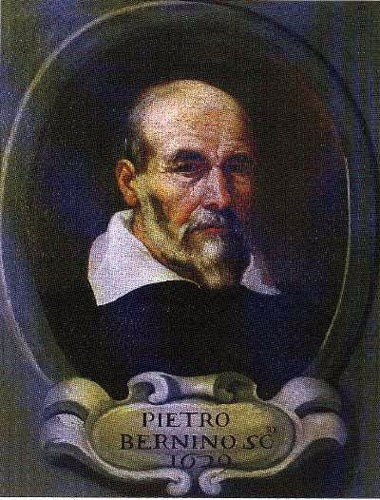
Portrait of Pietro Bernini, father of Gian Lorenzo

=== Youth ===
Bernini was born on 7 December 1598 in Naples to Angelica Galante, a Neapolitan, and Mannerist sculptor Pietro Bernini, originally from Florence. He was the sixth of their thirteen children. Gian Lorenzo Bernini was "recognized as a prodigy when he was only eight years old, [and] he was consistently encouraged by his father, Pietro. His precocity earned him the admiration and favour of powerful patrons who hailed him as 'the Michelangelo of his century'". More specifically, it was Pope Paul V, who after first attesting to the boy Bernini's talent, famously remarked, 'This child will be the Michelangelo of his age,' later repeating that prophecy to Cardinal Maffeo Barberini (the future Pope Urban VIII), as Domenico Bernini reports in his biography of his father. In 1606 his father received a papal commission (to contribute a marble relief to the Cappella Paolina of Santa Maria Maggiore) and so moved from Naples to Rome, taking his entire family with him and continuing in earnest the training of his son Gian Lorenzo.

Several extant works, dating c. 1615–1620, are by general scholarly consensus, collaborative efforts by both father and son: they include the Faun Teased by Putti (c. 1615, Metropolitan Museum, NYC), Boy with a Dragon (c. 1616–17, Getty Museum, Los Angeles), the Aldobrandini Four Seasons (c. 1620, private collection), and the recently discovered Bust of the Savior (1615–16, New York, private collection). Sometime after the arrival of the Bernini family in Rome, word about the great talent of the boy Gian Lorenzo spread throughout the city, and he soon caught the attention of Cardinal Scipione Borghese, nephew to the reigning pope, Paul V, who spoke of the boy genius to his uncle. Bernini was therefore presented before Pope Paul V, curious to see if the stories about Gian Lorenzo's talent were true. The boy improvised a sketch of Saint Paul for the marvelling pope, and this was the beginning of the pope's attention on this young talent.

Once he was brought to Rome, he rarely left its walls, except (much against his will) for a five-month stay in Paris in the service of King Louis XIV and brief trips to nearby towns (including Civitavecchia, Tivoli and Castelgandolfo), mostly for work-related reasons. Rome was Bernini's city: "You are made for Rome," said Pope Urban VIII to him, "and Rome for you." It was in this world of 17th-century Rome and the international religious-political power which resided there that Bernini created his greatest works. Bernini's works are therefore often characterized as perfect expressions of the spirit of the assertive, triumphal but self-defensive Counter Reformation Catholic Church. Certainly, Bernini was a man of his times and deeply religious (at least later in life), but he and his artistic production should not be reduced simply to instruments of the papacy and its political-doctrinal programs, an impression that is at times communicated by the works of the three most eminent Bernini scholars of the previous generation, Rudolf Wittkower, Howard Hibbard, and Irving Lavin. As Tomaso Montanari's recent revisionist monograph, La libertà di Bernini (Turin: Einaudi, 2016) argues and Franco Mormando's anti-hagiographic biography, Bernini: His Life and His Rome (Chicago: University of Chicago Press, 2011), illustrates, Bernini and his artistic vision maintained a certain degree of freedom from the mindset and mores of Counter-Reformation Roman Catholicism.

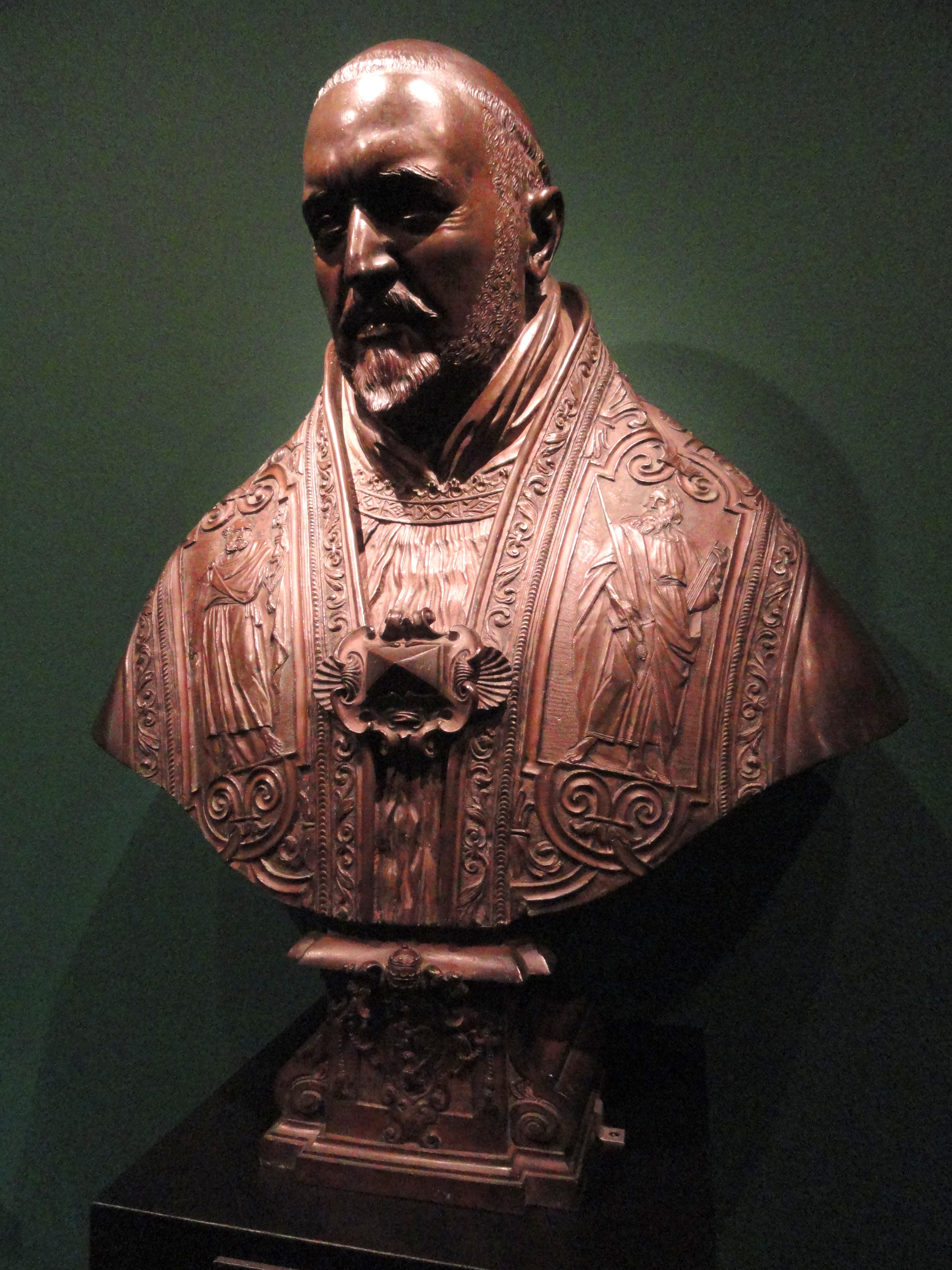
Bust of Pope Paul V (1621–1622) by Bernini

=== Partnership with Scipione Borghese ===
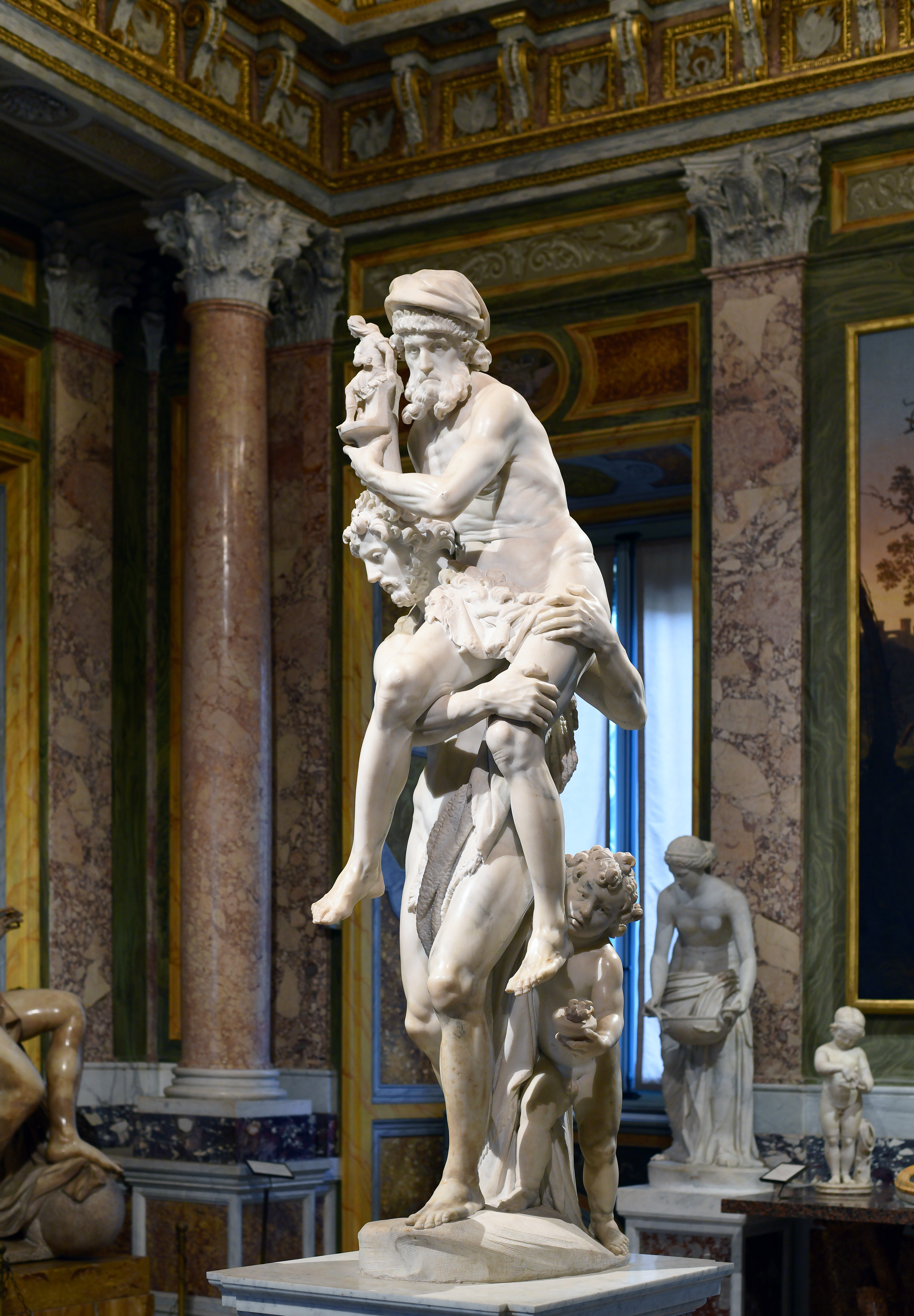
Aeneas, Anchises, and Ascanius (1619)

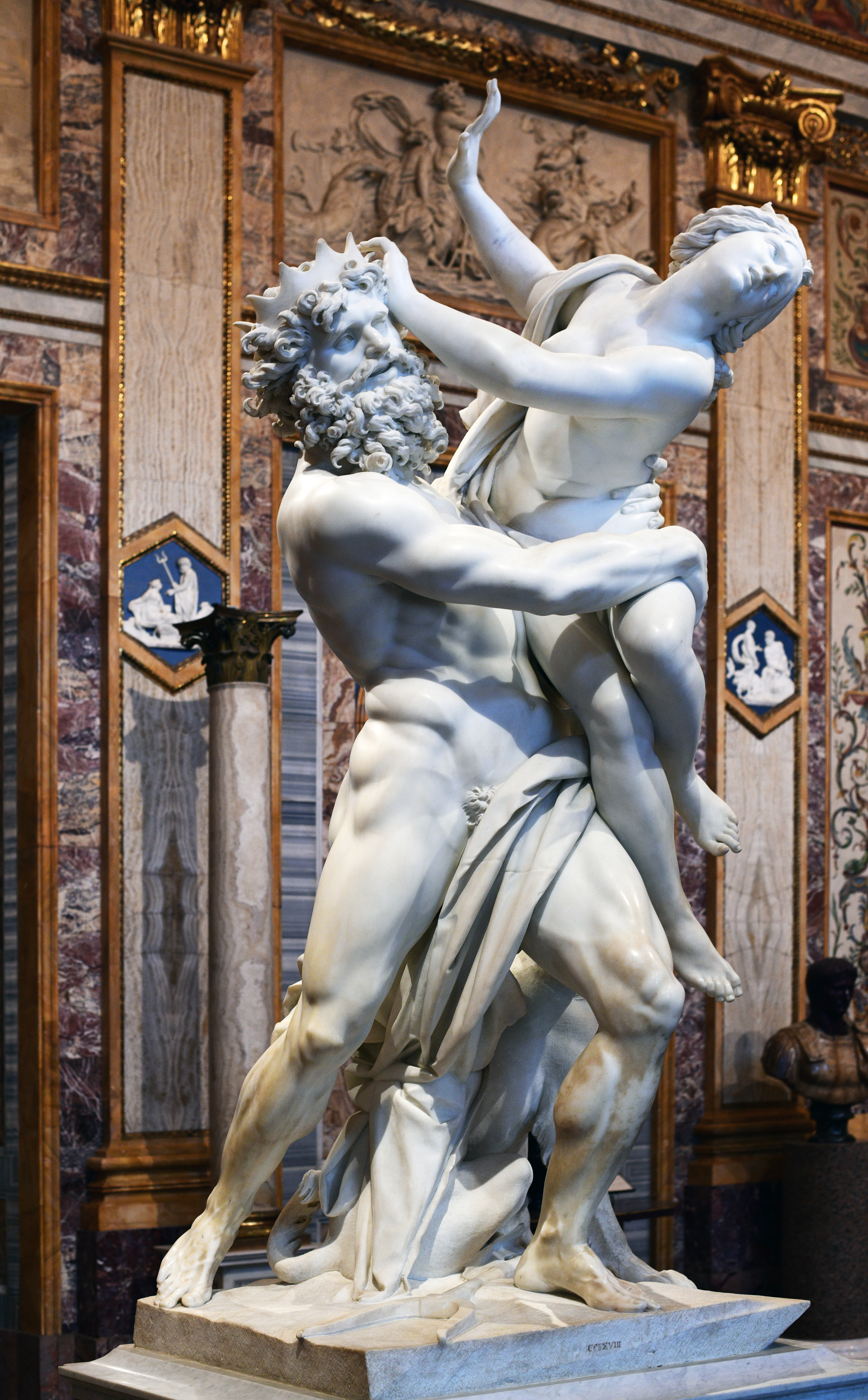
Rape of Proserpina (1621–22)

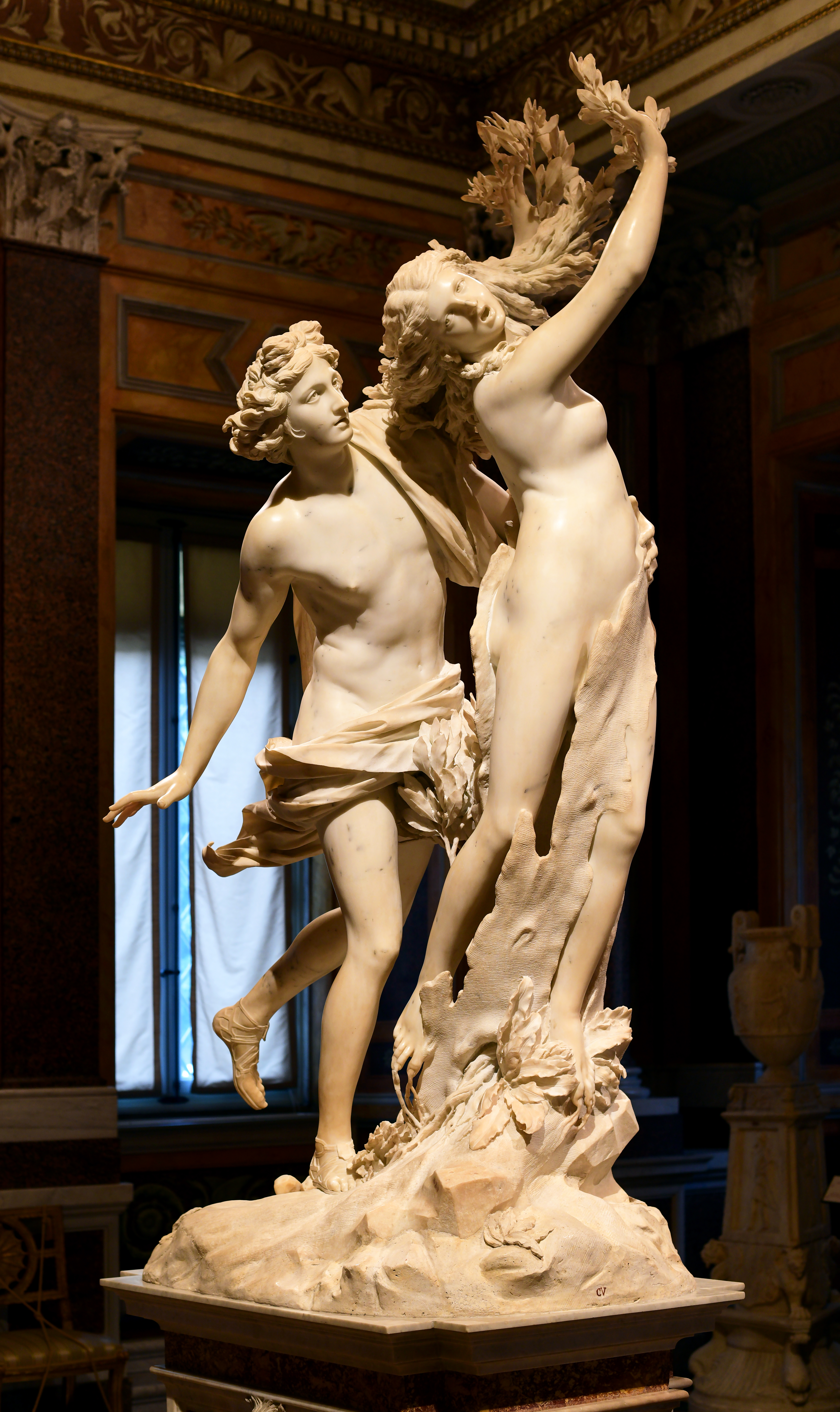
Apollo and Daphne (1622–25)

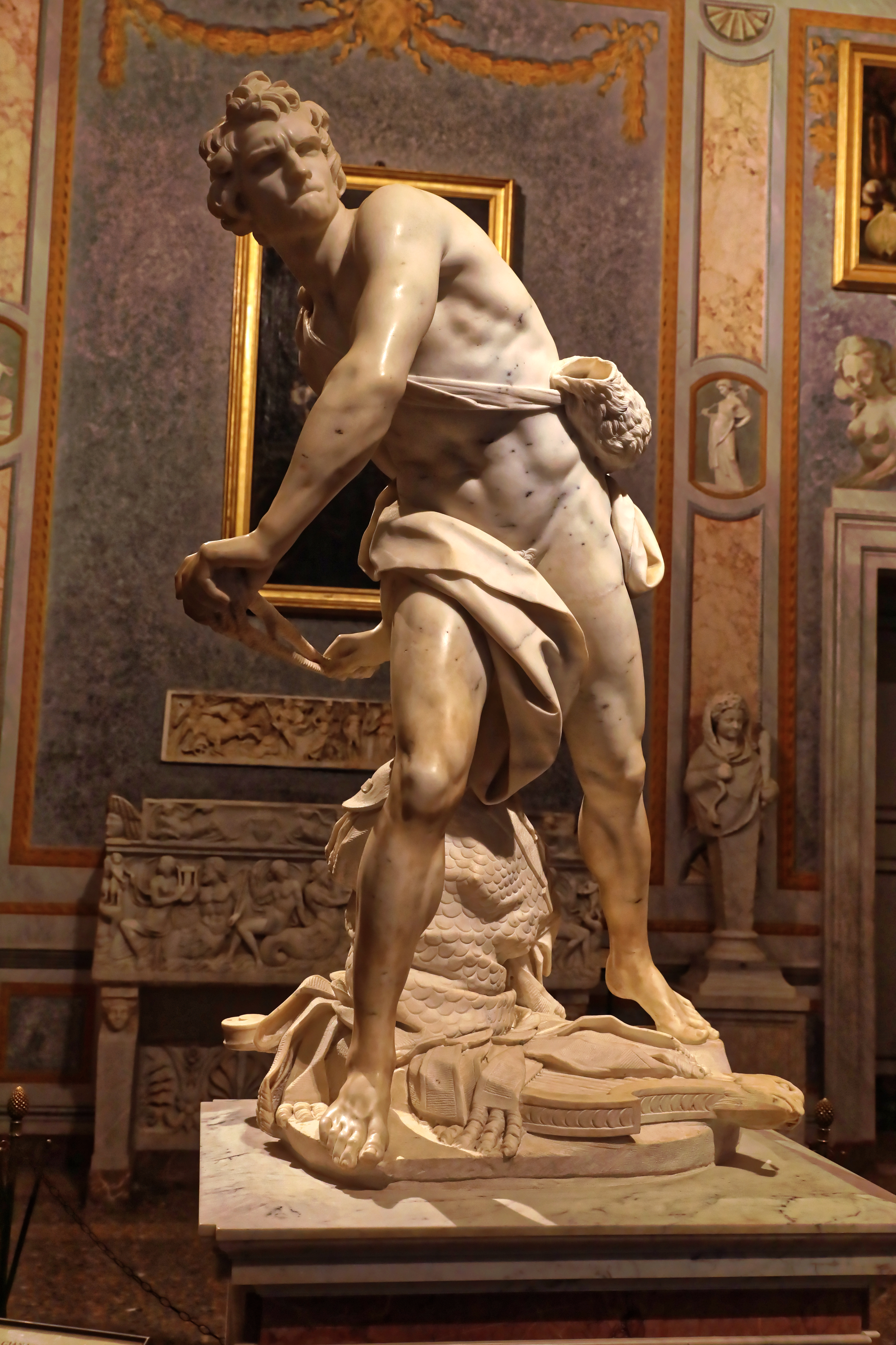
David (1623–24)

Under the patronage of the extravagantly wealthy and most powerful Cardinal Scipione Borghese, the young Bernini rapidly rose to prominence as a sculptor. Among his early works for the cardinal, as an assistant in his father's workshop, would have been small contributions to decorative pieces for the garden of the Villa Borghese, such as perhaps The Allegory of Autumn (formerly in the Hester Diamond collection in New York). Another small garden ornament work (in the Galleria Borghese since Bernini's lifetime), The Goat Amalthea with the Infant Jupiter and a Faun, was from 1926 until 2022 generally considered by scholars to be the earliest work executed entirely by the young Bernini himself, despite the fact that it is never mentioned in any of the contemporary sources, except for a late reference (1675) as a Bernini work by Joachim von Sandrart, a German visitor to Rome, an attribution that was given no credence until the twentieth century. Indeed, the official 2022 Catalogo generale (vol. 1, Sculture moderne, cat. 41) of the Galleria Borghese, edited by Anna Coliva (former director of the gallery), formally removes the attribution to Bernini completely, on the basis of both stylistic, technical, and historical (documentary) grounds.

Instead, among Bernini's earliest and securely documented works is his collaboration on his father's commission of February 1618 from Cardinal Maffeo Barberini to create four marble putti for the Barberini family chapel in the church of Sant'Andrea della Valle, the contract stipulating that his son Gian Lorenzo would assist in the execution of the statues. Also dating to 1618 is a letter by Maffeo Barberini in Rome to his brother Carlo in Florence, which mentions that he (Maffeo) was thinking of asking the young Gian Lorenzo to finish one of the statues left incomplete by Michelangelo, then in possession of Michelangelo's grandnephew which Maffeo was hoping to purchase, a remarkable attestation of the great skill that the young Bernini was already believed to possess.

Although the Michelangelo statue-completion commission came to nought, the young Bernini was shortly thereafter (in 1619) commissioned to repair and complete a famous work of antiquity, the Sleeping Hermaphroditus owned by Cardinal Scipione Borghese (Galleria Borghese, Rome) and later (c. 1622) restored the so-called Ludovisi Ares (Museo Nazionale Romano, Rome).

Also dating to this early period are the so-called Damned Soul and Blessed Soul of c. 1619, two small marble busts which may have been influenced by a set of prints by Pieter de Jode I or Karel van Mallery, but which were in fact unambiguously catalogued in the inventory of their first documented owner, Fernando de Botinete y Acevedo, as depicting a nymph and a satyr, a commonly paired duo in ancient sculpture (they were not commissioned by nor ever belonged to either Scipione Borghese or, as most scholarship erroneously claims, the Spanish cleric, Pedro Foix Montoya). By the time he was twenty-two, Bernini was considered talented enough to have been given a commission for a papal portrait, the Bust of Pope Paul V, now in the J. Paul Getty Museum.

Bernini's reputation, however, was definitively established by four masterpieces, executed between 1619 and 1625, all now displayed in the Galleria Borghese in Rome. To the art historian Rudolf Wittkower these four works—Aeneas, Anchises, and Ascanius (1619), The Rape of Proserpina (1621–22), Apollo and Daphne (1622–1625), and David (1623–24)—"inaugurated a new era in the history of European sculpture." It is a view repeated by other scholars, such as Howard Hibbard, who proclaimed that, in all of the seventeenth century, "there were no sculptors or architects comparable to Bernini." Adapting the classical grandeur of Renaissance sculpture and the dynamic energy of the Mannerist period, Bernini forged a new, distinctly Baroque conception for religious and historical sculpture, powerfully imbued with dramatic realism, stirring emotion and dynamic, theatrical compositions. Bernini's early sculpture groups and portraits manifest "a command of the human form in motion and a technical sophistication rivalled only by the greatest sculptors of classical antiquity." Moreover, Bernini possessed the ability to depict highly dramatic narratives with characters showing intense psychological states, but also to organize large-scale sculptural works that convey a magnificent grandeur.

Unlike sculptures done by his predecessors, these focus on specific points of narrative tension in the stories they are trying to tell: Aeneas and his family fleeing the burning Troy; the instant that Pluto finally grasps the hunted Persephone; the precise moment that Apollo sees his beloved Daphne begin her transformation into a tree. They are transitory but dramatic, powerful moments in each story. Bernini's David is another stirring example of this. Michelangelo's motionless, idealized David shows the subject holding a rock in one hand and a sling in the other, contemplating the battle; similarly immobile versions by other Renaissance artists, including Donatello's, show the subject in his triumph after the battle with Goliath. Bernini illustrates David during his active combat with the giant, as he twists his body to catapult toward Goliath. To emphasize these moments and to ensure that they were appreciated by the viewer, Bernini designed the sculptures with a specific viewpoint in mind, though he sculpted them fully in the round. Their original placements within the Villa Borghese were against walls so that the viewers' first view was the dramatic moment of the narrative.

The result of such an approach is to invest the sculptures with greater psychological energy. The viewer finds it easier to gauge the state of mind of the characters and therefore understands the larger story at work: Daphne's wide-open mouth in fear and astonishment, David biting his lip in determined concentration, or Proserpina desperately struggling to free herself. This is shown by how Bernini portrays her braids coming undone, which reveals her emotional distress. In addition to portraying psychological realism, they show a greater concern for representing physical details. The tousled hair of Pluto, the pliant flesh of Proserpina, or the forest of leaves beginning to envelop Daphne all demonstrate Bernini's exactitude and delight for representing complex real-world textures in marble form.

=== Papal artist: the pontificate of Urban VIII ===
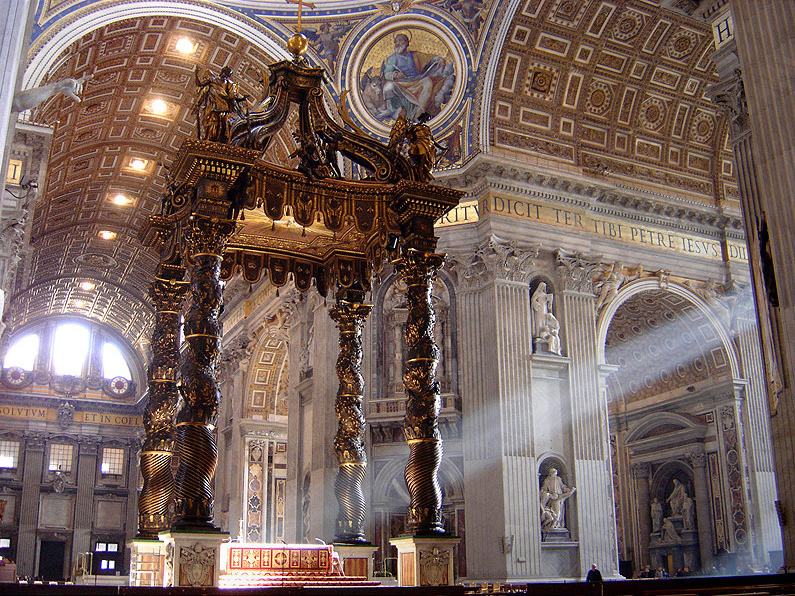
Baldacchino in St. Peter's Basilica

In 1621, Pope Paul V Borghese was succeeded on the throne of St. Peter by another admiring friend of Bernini's, Cardinal Alessandro Ludovisi, who became Pope Gregory XV: although his reign was very short (he died in 1623), Pope Gregory commissioned portraits of himself (both in marble and bronze) by Bernini. The pontiff also bestowed upon Bernini the honorific rank of 'Cavaliere,' the title with which for the rest of his life the artist was habitually referred. In 1623 came the ascent to the papal throne of his aforementioned friend and former tutor, Cardinal Maffeo Barberini, as Pope Urban VIII, and henceforth (until Urban's death in 1644) Bernini enjoyed near monopolistic patronage from the Barberini pope and family. The new Pope Urban is reported to have remarked, "It is a great fortune for you, Cavaliere Bernini, to see Cardinal Maffeo Barberini made pope, but our fortune is even greater to have Cavaliere Bernini alive in our pontificate." Although he did not fare as well during the reign (1644–55) of Innocent X, under Innocent's successor, Alexander VII (reigned 1655–67), Bernini once again gained pre-eminent artistic domination and continued in the successive pontificate to be held in high regard by Clement IX during his short reign (1667–69).

Under Urban VIII's patronage, Bernini's horizons rapidly and widely broadened: he was not just producing sculpture for private residences, but playing the most significant artistic (and engineering) role on the city stage, as sculptor, architect, and urban planner. His official appointments also testify to this—"curator of the papal art collection, director of the papal foundry at Castel Sant'Angelo, commissioner of the fountains of Piazza Navona". Such positions gave Bernini the opportunity to demonstrate his versatile skills throughout the city. To great protest of older, experienced master architects, he, with virtually no architectural training to his name, was appointed "Architect of St Peter's" in 1629, upon the death of Carlo Maderno. From then on, Bernini's work and artistic vision would be placed at the symbolic heart of Rome.

Bernini's artistic pre-eminence under Urban VIII (and later under Alexander VII) meant he was able to secure the most important commissions in the Rome of his day, namely, the various massive embellishment projects of the newly finished St. Peter's Basilica, completed under Pope Paul V with the addition of Maderno's nave and facade and finally re-consecrated by Pope Urban VIII on 18 November 1626, after 100 years of planning and building. Within the basilica, he was responsible for the Baldacchino, the decoration of the four piers under the cupola, the Cathedra Petri or Chair of St. Peter in the apse, the Tomb of Countess Matilda of Tuscany, the chapel of the Blessed Sacrament in the right nave, and the decoration (floor, walls and arches) of the new nave. The Baldacchino immediately became the visual centrepiece of the basilica. Designed as a massive spiraling gilded bronze canopy over the tomb of St Peter, Bernini's four-columned creation reached nearly 30 m (98 ft) from the ground and cost around 200,000 Roman scudi (about 8 million US dollars in the currency of the early 21st century). "Quite simply", writes one art historian, "nothing like it had ever been seen before". Soon after the completion of the Baldacchino, Bernini undertook the whole-scale embellishment of the four massive piers at the crossing of the basilica (i.e., the structures supporting the cupola), including, most notably, four colossal, theatrically dramatic statues. Among the latter is the majestic St. Longinus executed by Bernini himself (the other three are by other contemporary sculptors François Duquesnoy, Francesco Mochi, and Bernini's disciple, Andrea Bolgi).

In the basilica, Bernini also began work on the tomb for Urban VIII, completed only after Urban's death in 1644, one in a long, distinguished series of tombs and funerary monuments for which Bernini is famous and a traditional genre upon which his influence left an enduring mark, often copied by subsequent artists. Indeed, Bernini's final and most original tomb monument, the Tomb of Pope Alexander VII, in St. Peter's Basilica, represents, according to Erwin Panofsky, the very pinnacle of European funerary art, whose creative inventiveness subsequent artists could not hope to surpass.

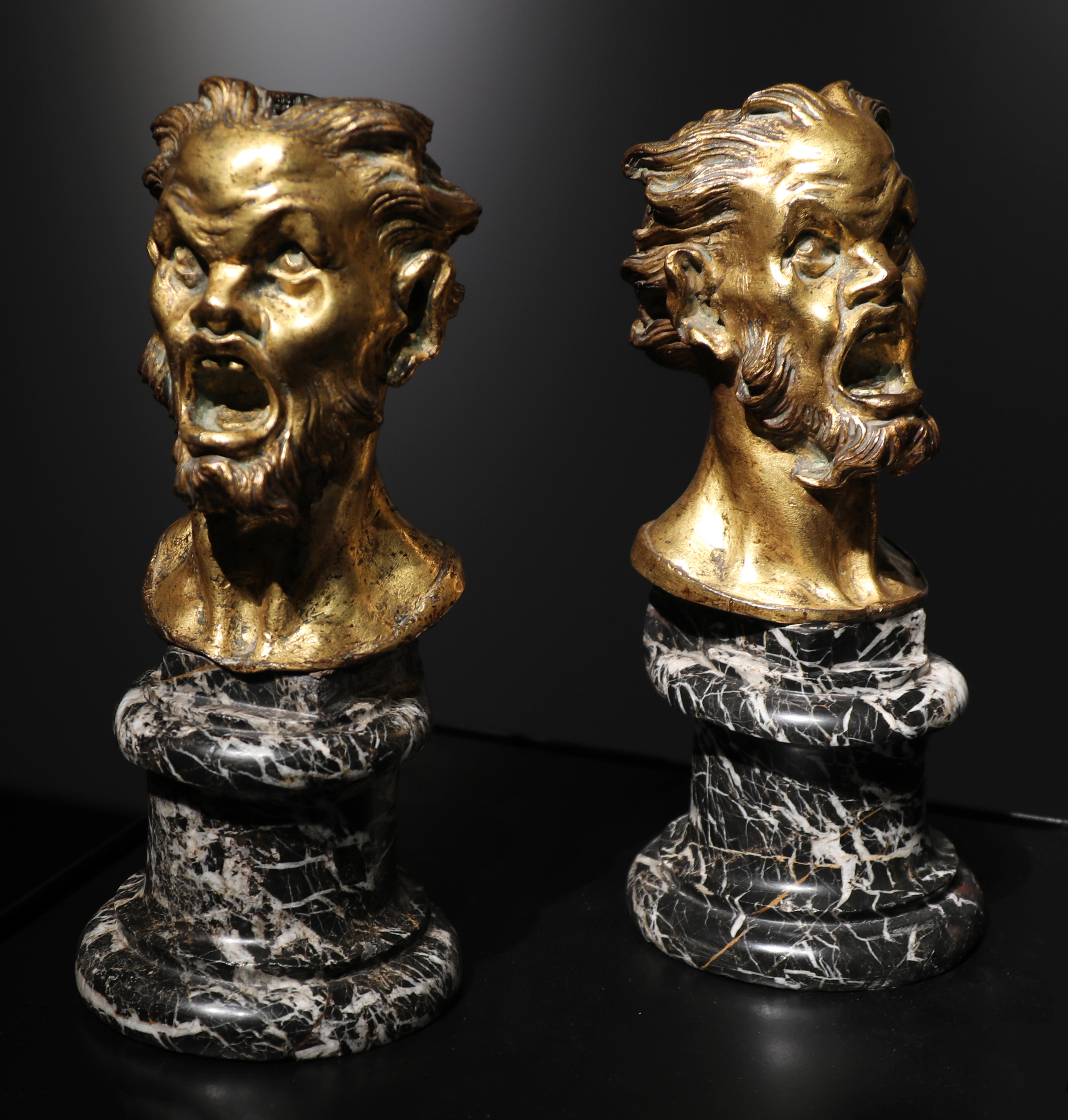
Screaming Heads

Despite this busy engagement with large works of public architecture, Bernini was still able to devote himself to his sculpture, especially portraits in marble, but also large statues such as the life-size Saint Bibiana (1624, Church of Santa Bibiana, Rome). Bernini's portraits show his ever-increasing ability to capture the utterly distinctive personal characteristics of his sitters, as well as his ability to achieve in cold white marble almost painterly-like effects that render with convincing realism the various surfaces involved: human flesh, hair, fabric of varying type, metal, etc. These portraits included a number of busts of Urban VIII himself, the family bust of Francesco Barberini and most notably, the Two Busts of Scipione Borghese—the second of which had been rapidly created by Bernini once a flaw had been found in the marble of the first. The transitory nature of the expression on Scipione's face is often noted by art historians, as iconic of the Baroque concern for representing fleeting movement in static artworks. To Rudolf Wittkower the "beholder feels that in the twinkle of an eye not only might the expression and attitude change but also the folds of the casually arranged mantle".

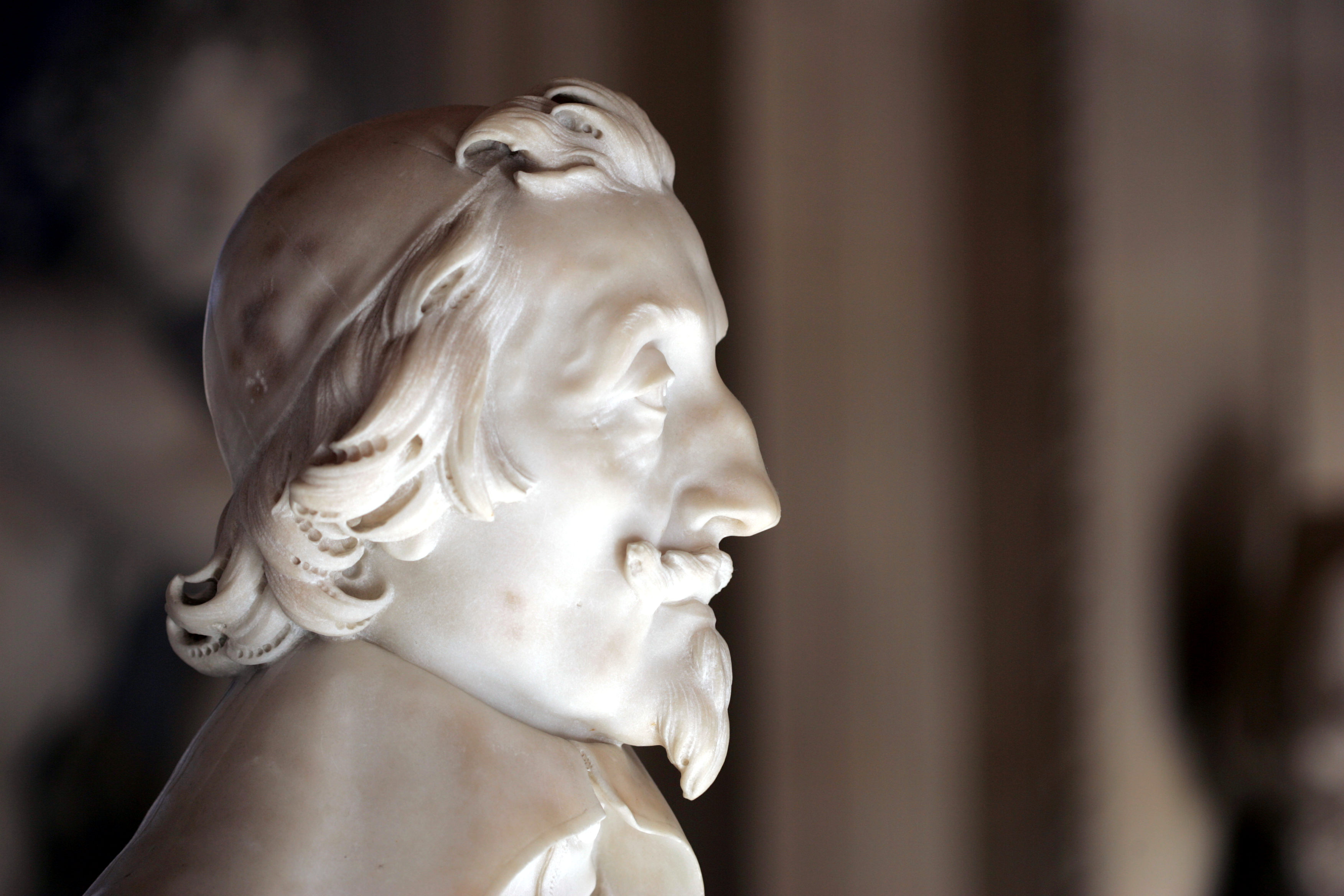
Bust of Armand, Cardinal de Richelieu (1640–1641)

Other marble portraits in this period include that of Costanza Bonarelli, unusual in its more personal, intimate nature. (At the time of the sculpting of the portrait, Bernini was having an affair with Costanza, wife of one of his assistants, sculptor Matteo.) Indeed, it would appear to be the first marble portrait of a non-aristocratic woman by a major artist in European history.

Beginning in the late 1630s, now known in Europe as one of the most accomplished portraitists in marble, Bernini also began to receive royal commissions from outside Rome, for subjects such as Cardinal Richelieu of France, Francesco I d'Este the powerful Duke of Modena, Charles I of England and his wife, Queen Henrietta Maria. The bust of Charles I was produced in Rome from a triple portrait (oil on canvas) executed by Van Dyck, which survives today in the British Royal Collection. The bust of Charles was lost in the Whitehall Palace fire of 1698 (though its design is known through contemporary copies and drawings) and that of Henrietta Maria was not undertaken due to the outbreak of the English Civil War.

=== Temporary eclipse and resurgence under Innocent X ===
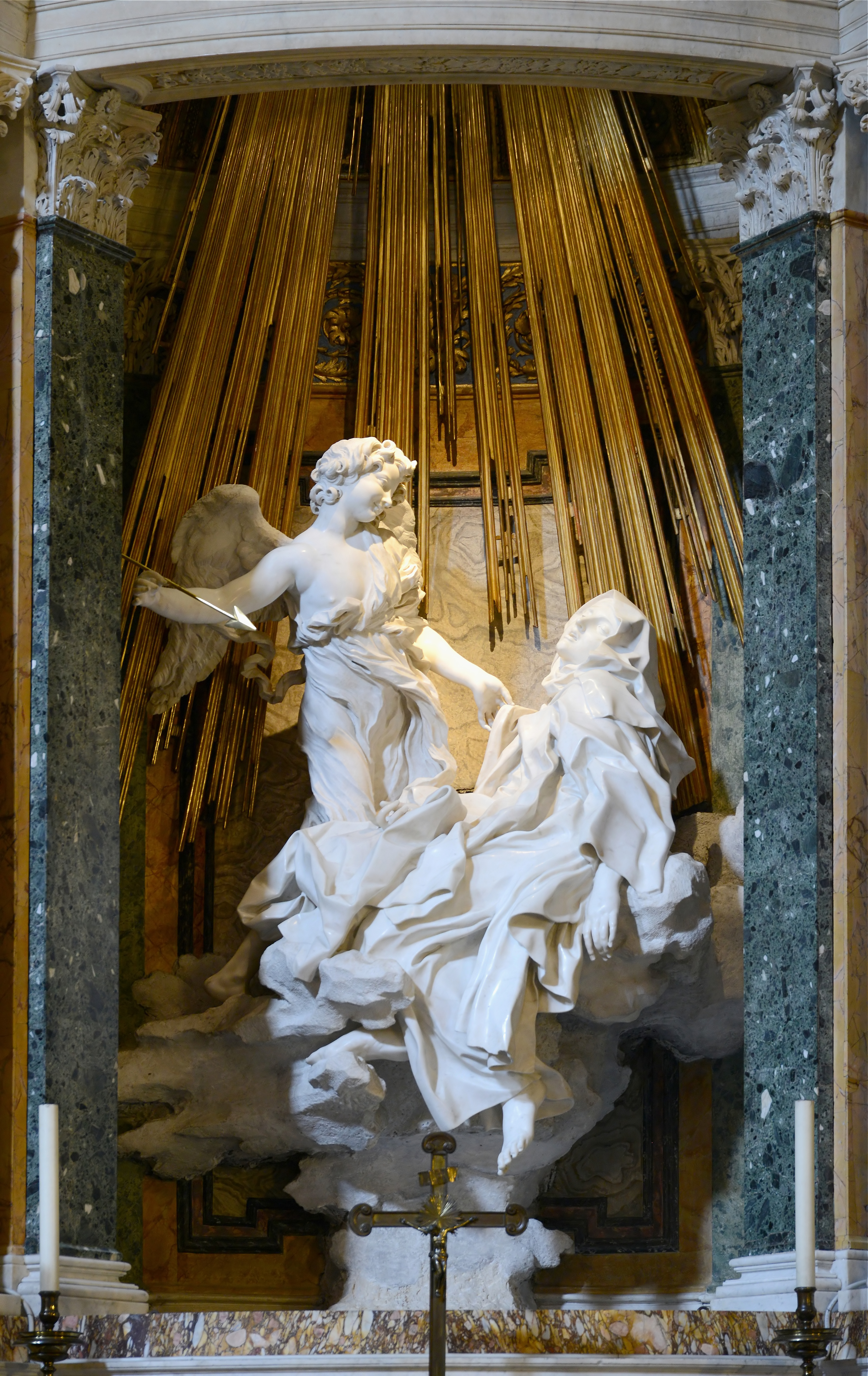
Ecstasy of Saint Teresa, 1651

In 1644, with the death of Pope Urban, with whom Bernini had been so intimately connected and the ascent to power of the fierce Barberini-enemy Pope Innocent X Pamphilj, Bernini's career suffered a major, unprecedented eclipse, which was to last four years. This had not only to do with Innocent's anti-Barberini politics but also with Bernini's role in the disastrous project of the new bell towers for St. Peter's Basilica, designed and supervised entirely by Bernini.

The infamous bell tower affair was to be the biggest failure of his career, both professionally and financially. In 1636, eager to finally finish the exterior of St. Peter's, Pope Urban had ordered Bernini to design and build the two long-intended bell towers for its facade: the foundations of the two towers had already been designed and constructed (namely, the last bays at either extremity of the facade) by Carlo Maderno (architect of the nave and the façade) decades earlier. Once the first tower was finished in 1641, cracks began to appear in the façade, but work continued on the second tower, and the first storey was completed. Despite the presence of the cracks, work only stopped in July 1642 once the papal treasury had been exhausted by the disastrous Wars of Castro. Knowing that Bernini could no longer depend on the protection of a favourable pope, his enemies (especially Francesco Borromini) raised a great alarm over the cracks, predicting a disaster for the whole basilica and placing the blame entirely on Bernini. The subsequent investigations, in fact, revealed the cause of the cracks as Maderno's defective foundations and not Bernini's elaborate design, an exoneration later confirmed by the meticulous investigation conducted in 1680 under Pope Innocent XI.

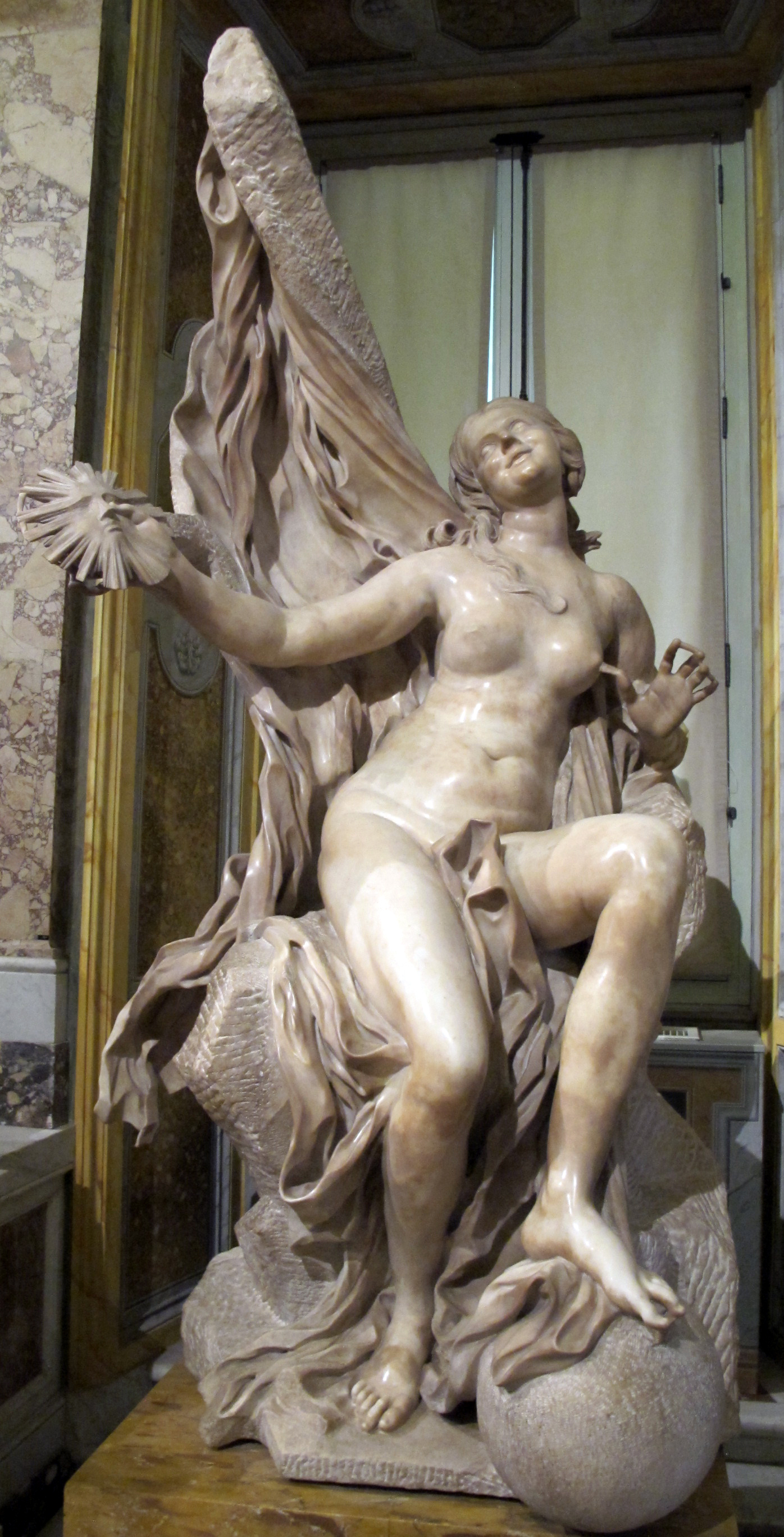
Truth Unveiled by Time, Galleria Borghese, Rome, 1645–1652

Nonetheless, Bernini's opponents in Rome succeeded in seriously damaging the reputation of Urban's artist and in persuading Pope Innocent to order (in February 1646) the complete demolition of both towers, to Bernini's great humiliation and indeed financial detriment (in the form of a substantial fine for the failure of the work). After this, one of the rare failures of his career, Bernini retreated into himself: according to his son, Domenico. His subsequent unfinished statue of 1647, Truth Unveiled by Time, was intended to be his self-consoling commentary on this affair, expressing his faith that eventually Time would reveal the actual Truth behind the story and exonerate him fully, as indeed did occur.

Although he received no personal commissions from Innocent or the Pamphilj family in the early years of the new papacy, Bernini did not lose his former positions granted to him by previous popes. Innocent X maintained Bernini in all of the official roles given to him by Urban, including his most prestigious one as "Architect of St. Peter's." Under Bernini's design and direction, work continued on decorating the massive, recently completed but still entirely unadorned nave of St. Peter's, with the addition of elaborate multi-coloured marble flooring, marble facing on the walls and pilasters, and scores of stuccoed statues and reliefs. It is not without reason that Pope Alexander VII once quipped, 'If one were to remove from Saint Peter's everything that had been made by the Cavalier Bernini, that temple would be stripped bare.' Indeed, given all of his many and various works within the basilica over several decades, it is to Bernini that is due the lion's share of responsibility for the final and enduring aesthetic appearance and emotional impact of St. Peter's. He was also allowed to continue to work on Urban VIII's tomb, despite Innocent's antipathy for the Barberini. A few months after completing Urban's tomb, in 1648 Bernini won (through furtive manoeuvring with the complicity of the pope's sister-in-law Donna Olimpia) the Pamphilj commission for the prestigious Four Rivers Fountain on Piazza Navona, marking the end of his disgrace and the beginning a yet another glorious chapter in his life.

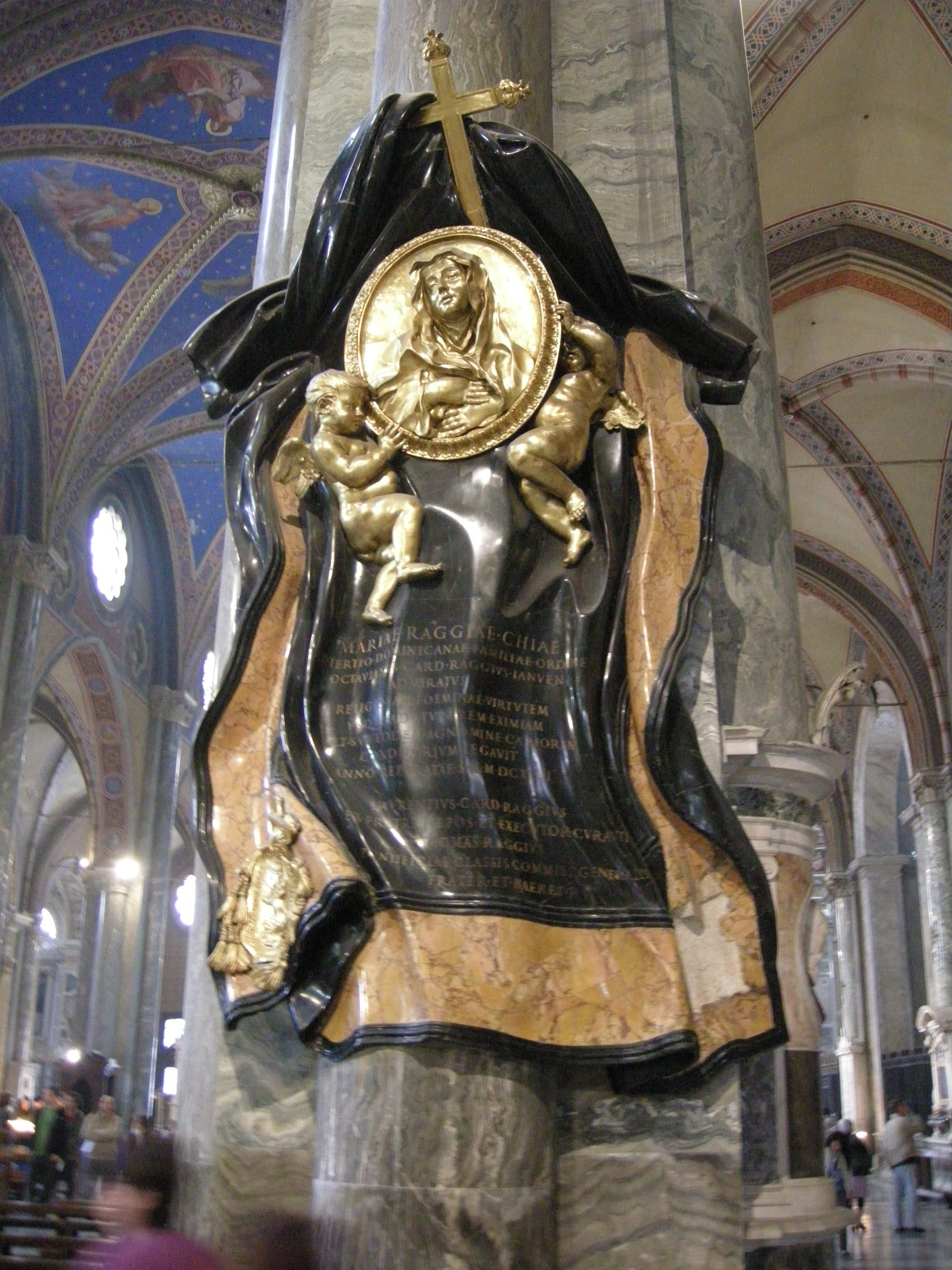
Memorial to Maria Raggi, 1651

If there had been doubts over Bernini's position as Rome's preeminent artist, they were definitively removed by the unqualified success of the marvellously delightful and technically ingenious Four Rivers Fountain, featuring a heavy ancient obelisk placed over a void created by a cave-like rock formation placed in the centre of an ocean of exotic sea creatures. Bernini continued to receive commissions from Pope Innocent X and other senior members of Rome's clergy and aristocracy, as well as from exalted patrons outside of Rome, such as Francesco d'Este. Recovering quickly from the humiliation of the bell towers, Bernini's boundless creativity continued as before. New types of funerary monument were designed, such as, in the Church of Santa Maria sopra Minerva, the seemingly floating medallion, hovering in the air as it were, for the deceased nun Maria Raggi, while chapels he designed, such as the Raimondi Chapel in the church of San Pietro in Montorio, illustrated how Bernini could use hidden lighting to help suggest divine intervention within the narratives he was depicting and to add a dramatically theatrical "spotlight" to enhance the main focus of the space.

One of the most accomplished and celebrated works to come from Bernini's hand in this period was the Cornaro Family Chapel in the small Carmelite church of Santa Maria della Vittoria, Rome. The Cornaro Chapel (inaugurated in 1651) showcased Bernini's ability to integrate sculpture, architecture, fresco, stucco, and lighting into "a marvellous whole" (bel composto, to use early biographer Filippo Baldinucci's term to describe his approach to architecture) and thus create what scholar Irving Lavin has called the "unified work of art". The central focus of the Cornaro Chapel is the Ecstasy of Saint Teresa, depicting the so-called "transverberation" of the Spanish nun and saint-mystic, Teresa of Avila. Bernini presents the spectator with a theatrically vivid portrait, in gleaming white marble, of the swooning Teresa and the quietly smiling angel, who delicately grips the arrow piercing the saint's heart. On either side of the chapel the artist places (in what can only strike the viewer as theatre boxes), portraits in relief of various members of the Cornaro family—the Venetian family memorialized in the chapel, including Cardinal Federico Cornaro who commissioned the chapel from Bernini—who are in animated conversation among themselves, presumably about the event taking place before them. The result is a complex but subtly orchestrated architectural environment providing the spiritual context (a heavenly setting with a hidden source of light) that suggests to viewers the ultimate nature of this miraculous event.

Nonetheless, during Bernini's lifetime and in the centuries following till this very day, Bernini's Saint Teresa has been accused of crossing a line of decency by sexualizing the visual depiction of the saint's experience, to a degree that no artist, before or after Bernini, dared to do: in depicting her at an impossibly young chronological age, as an idealized delicate beauty, in a semi-prostrate position with her mouth open and her legs splayed-apart, her wimple coming undone, with prominently displayed bare feet (Discalced Carmelites, for modesty, always wore sandals with heavy stockings) and with the seraph "undressing" her by (unnecessarily) parting her mantle to penetrate her heart with his arrow.

Matters of decorum aside, Bernini's Teresa was still an artistic tour de force that incorporates all of the multiple forms of visual art and technique that Bernini had at his disposal, including hidden lighting, thin gilded beams, recessive architectural space, secret lens, and over twenty diverse types of colored marble: these all combine to create the final artwork—"a perfected, highly dramatic and deeply satisfying seamless ensemble".

=== Embellishment of Rome under Alexander VII ===
Upon his accession to the Chair of St Peter, Pope Alexander VII Chigi (reigned 1655–1667) began to implement his extremely ambitious plan to transform Rome into a world capital by means of systematic, expensive urban planning. In doing so, he brought to fruition the long, slow re-creation of the urban glory of Rome—the deliberate campaign for the "renovatio Romae"—that had begun in the fifteenth century under the Renaissance popes. Over the course of his pontificate, Alexander commissioned many large-scale architectural changes in the city, Including some of the most significant ones in the city's recent history, choosing Bernini as his principal collaborator (though other architects, especially Pietro da Cortona, were also involved).

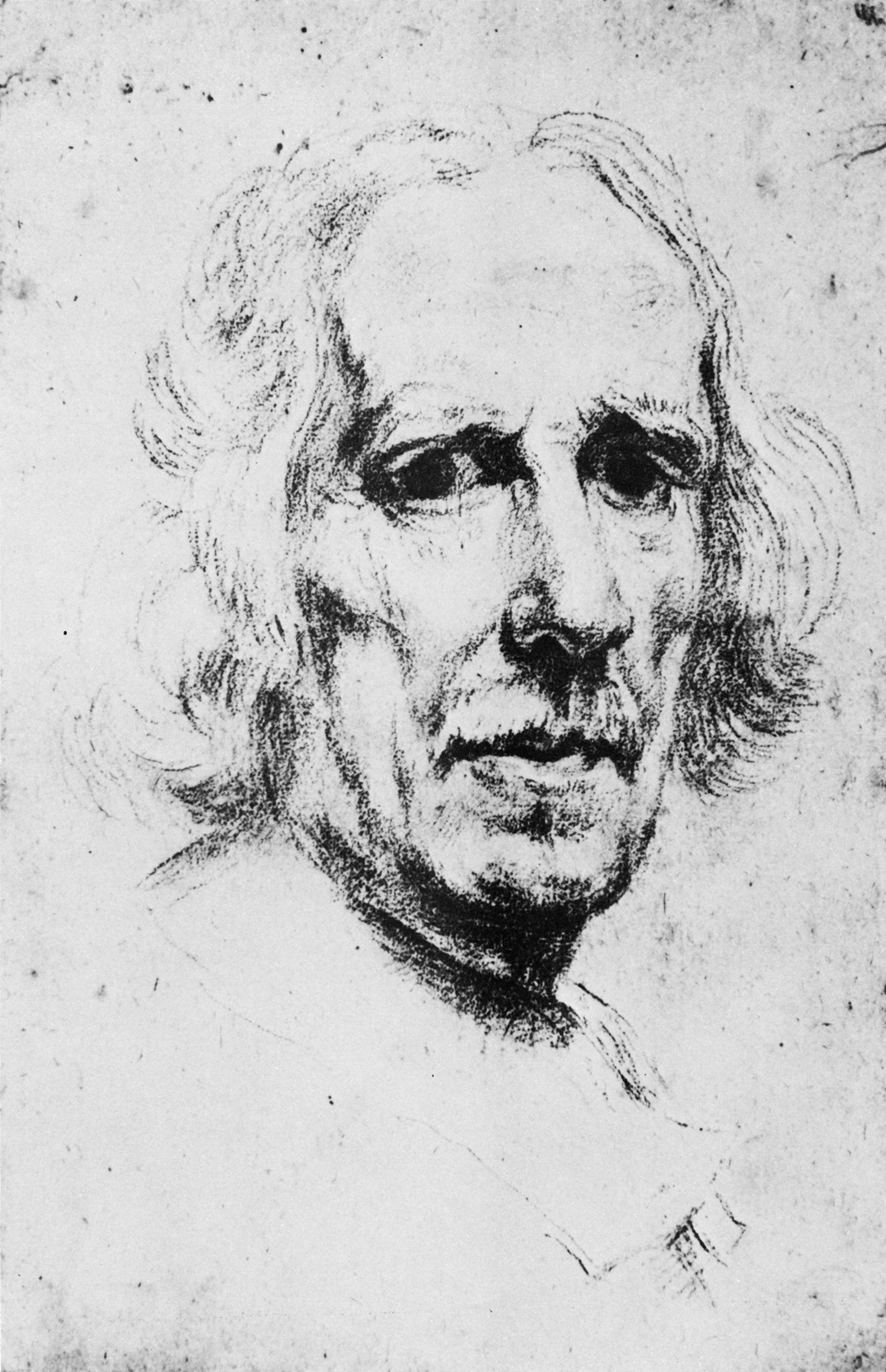
Bernini self-portrait, c. 1665

Bernini's major commissions during this period include St. Peter's Square. In a previously broad, irregular, and completely unstructured space, he created two massive semi-circular colonnades, each row of which was formed of four simple white Doric columns. This resulted in an oval shape that formed an inclusive arena within which any gathering of citizens, pilgrims and visitors could witness the appearance of the pope—either as he appeared on the loggia on the façade of St Peter's or at the traditional window of the neighbouring Palazzo Vaticano, to the right of the square. In addition to being logistically efficient for carriages and crowds, Bernini's design was completely in harmony with the pre-existing buildings and added to the majesty of the basilica. Often likened to two arms reaching out from the church to embrace the waiting crowd, Bernini's creation extended the symbolic greatness of the Vatican area, creating an emotionally thrilling and "exhilarating expanse" that was, architecturally, an "unequivocal success".

Elsewhere in the Vatican, Bernini rearranged and decorated spaces that had been empty or aesthetically undistinguished; they survive today as he designed them. In the previously unadorned apse of the basilica, the Cathedra Petri, the symbolic throne of St Peter, was reworked into a monumental gilded bronze ensemble that complemented the Baldacchino created earlier in the century. Bernini's complete reconstruction of the Scala Regia, the papal stairway between St Peter's and the Vatican Palace, was less ornate but technically demanding: he used optical illusions to make it appear uniform while connecting two irregular buildings within an even more irregular space.

Not all works during this era were on such a large scale. Indeed, the commission Bernini received to build the church of Sant'Andrea al Quirinale for the Jesuits was relatively modest in physical size (though great in its interior chromatic splendour), which Bernini executed completely free of charge. Sant'Andrea shared with Piazza San Pietro—unlike the complex geometries of his rival Francesco Borromini—a focus on basic geometric shapes, circles, and ovals to create spiritually intense spaces. He also designed the church of Santa Maria Assunta (1662–65) in the town of Ariccia with its circular outline, rounded dome and three-arched portico, reminiscent of the Pantheon. In Santa Maria Assunta, as in his church of St. Thomas of Villanova in Castelgandolfo (1658–61), Bernini completely eschewed the rich polychrome marble decoration dramatically seen in Sant'Andrea and the Cornaro Chapel in Santa Maria della Vittoria, in favour of an essentially white, somewhat stark interior, albeit still much adorned with stucco work and painted altarpieces.

=== Visit to France and service to King Louis XIV ===
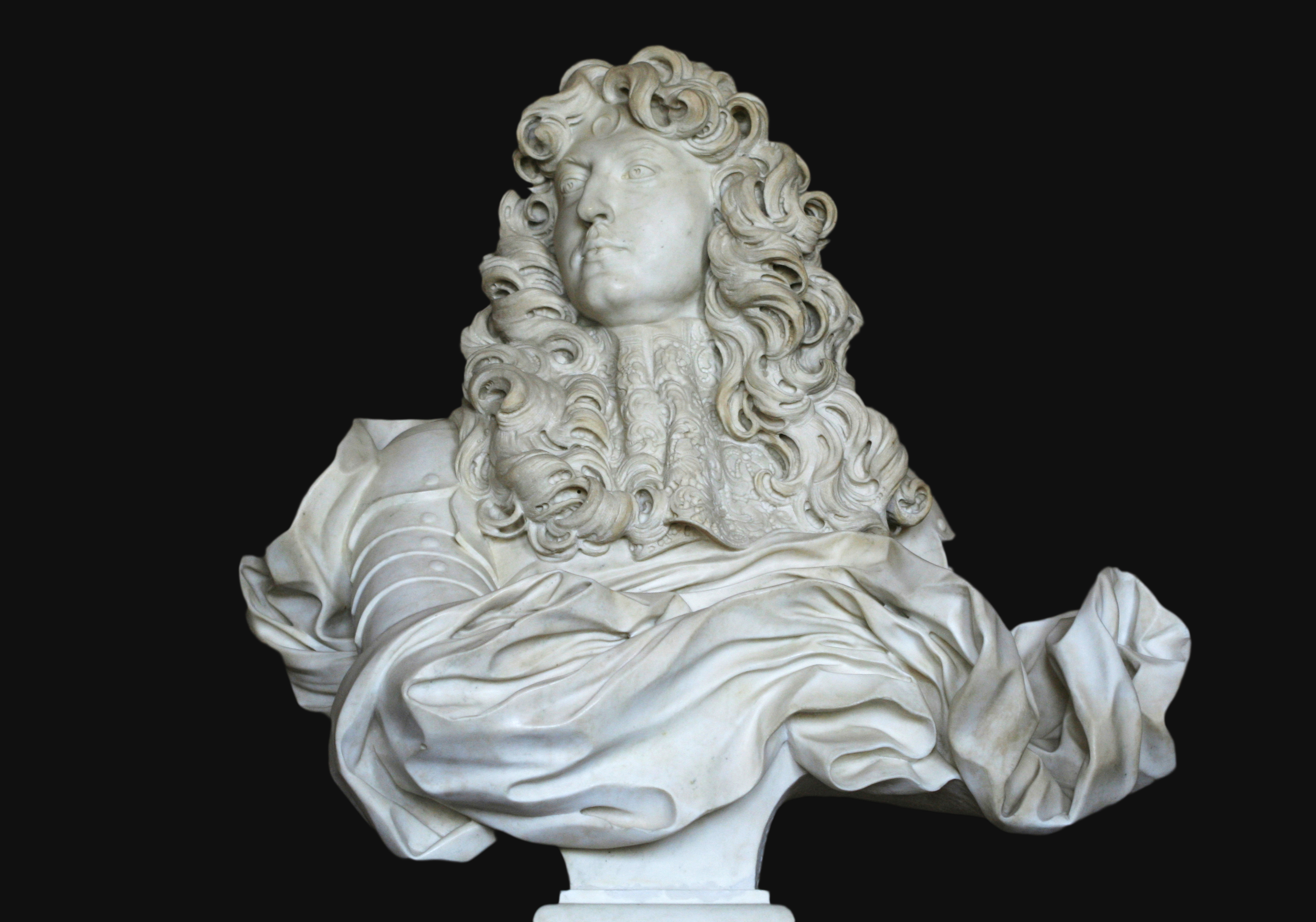
Bust of Louis XIV, 1665

At the end of April 1665, and still considered the most important artist in Rome, if indeed not in all of Europe, Bernini was forced by political pressure (from both the French court and Pope Alexander VII) to travel to Paris to work for King Louis XIV, who required an architect to complete work on the royal palace of the Louvre. Bernini would remain in Paris until mid-October. Louis XIV assigned a member of his court to serve as Bernini's translator, tourist guide, and overall companion, Paul Fréart de Chantelou, who kept a Journal of Bernini's visit that records much of Bernini's behaviour and utterances in Paris. The writer Charles Perrault, who was serving at this time as an assistant to the French Controller-General of Finances Jean-Baptiste Colbert, also provided a first-hand account of Bernini's visit.

Bernini was popular among the crowds who gathered wherever he stopped, which led him to compare his itinerary to the travelling exhibition of an elephant. On his walks in Paris, the streets were lined with admiring crowds too. But things soon turned sour. Bernini presented finished designs for the east front (i.e., the all-important principal facade of the entire palace) of the Louvre, which were ultimately rejected, albeit not formally until 1667, well after his departure from Paris (indeed, the already constructed foundations for Bernini's Louvre addition were inaugurated in October 1665 in an elaborate ceremony, with both Bernini and King Louis in attendance). It is often stated in the scholarship on Bernini that his Louvre designs were turned down because Louis and his finance minister, Jean-Baptiste Colbert, considered them too Italianate or too Baroque in style. In fact, as Franco Mormando points out, "aesthetics are never mentioned in any of [the] ... surviving memos" by Colbert or any of the artistic advisors at the French court. The explicit reasons for the rejections were utilitarian, namely, on the level of physical security and comfort (e.g., location of the latrines). It is also indisputable that there was an interpersonal conflict between Bernini and the young French king, each one feeling insufficiently respected by the other. Though his design for the Louvre went unbuilt, it circulated widely throughout Europe by means of engravings, and its direct influence can be seen in subsequent stately residences such as Chatsworth House, Derbyshire, England, seat of the Dukes of Devonshire.

Other projects in Paris suffered a similar fate, such as Bernini's plans for the Bourbon funerary chapel in the cathedral of Saint Denis and the main altar of the Church of Val de Grâce (done at the request of its patron, the Queen Mother), as well as his idea for a fountain for Saint-Cloud, the estate of King Louis's brother, Philippe. With the exception of Chantelou, Bernini failed to forge significant friendships at the French court. His frequent negative comments on various aspects of French culture, especially its art and architecture, did not go down well, particularly in juxtaposition to his praise for the art and architecture of Italy (especially Rome); he said that a painting by Guido Reni, the Annunciation altarpiece (then in the Carmelite convent, now the Louvre Museum), was "alone worth half of Paris." The sole work remaining from his time in Paris is the Bust of Louis XIV although he also contributed a great deal to the execution of the Christ Child Playing with a Nail marble relief (now in the Louvre) by his son Paolo as a gift to Queen Maria Theresa. Back in Rome, Bernini created a monumental equestrian statue of Louis XIV; when it finally reached Paris (in 1685, five years after the artist's death), the French king found it extremely repugnant and wanted it destroyed; it was instead re-carved into a representation of the ancient Roman hero Marcus Curtius.

=== Later years and death ===
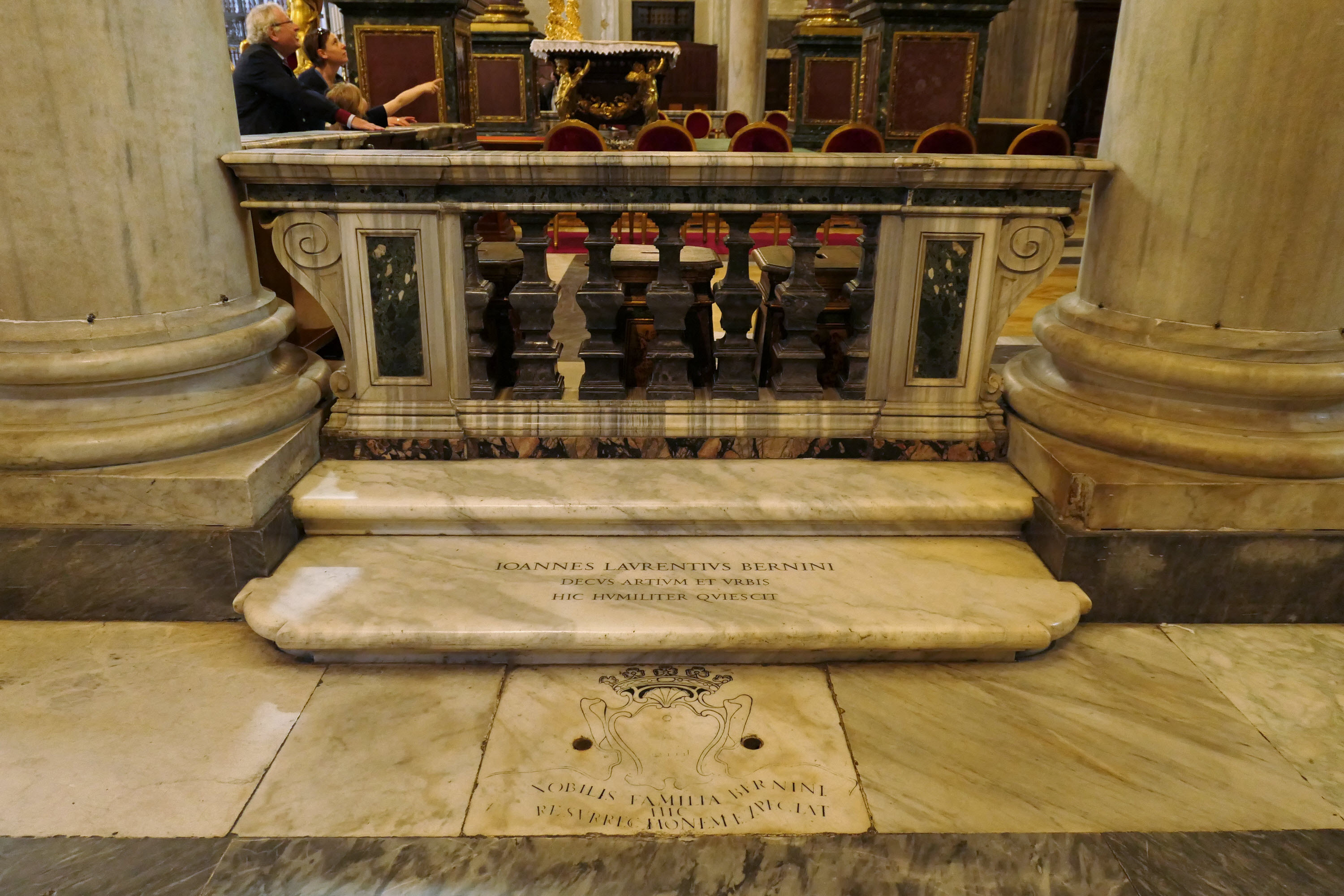
Tomb of Gian Lorenzo Bernini in the Basilica di Santa Maria Maggiore

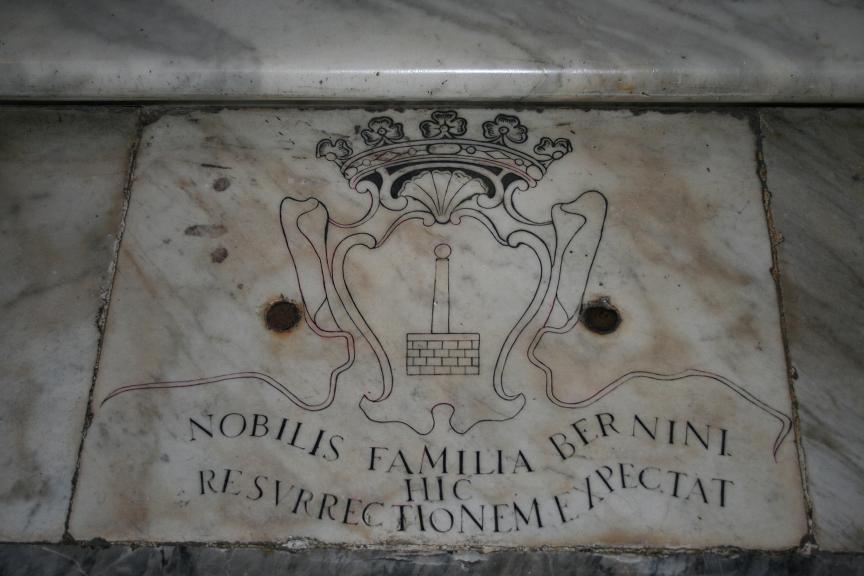
The grave of Bernini in the Basilica di Santa Maria Maggiore

Bernini remained physically and mentally vigorous and active in his profession until just two weeks before his death, which came as a result of a stroke. The pontificate of his old friend, Clement IX, was too short (barely two years) to accomplish more than the dramatic refurbishment by Bernini of the Ponte Sant'Angelo, while the artist's elaborate plan, under Clement, for a new apse for the basilica of Santa Maria Maggiore came to an unpleasant end in the midst of public uproar over its cost and the destruction of ancient mosaics that it entailed. The last two popes of Bernini's life, Clement X and Innocent XI, were both not especially close or sympathetic to Bernini and not particularly interested in financing works of art and architecture, especially given the disastrous conditions of the papal treasury. The most important commission by Bernini, executed entirely by him in just six months in 1674, under Clement X, was the statue of the Blessed Ludovica Albertoni, another nun-mystic. The work, reminiscent of Bernini's Ecstasy of Saint Teresa, is located in the chapel dedicated to Ludovica remodelled under Bernini's supervision in the Trastevere church of San Francesco a Ripa, whose façade was designed by Bernini's disciple, Mattia de' Rossi.

In his last two years, Bernini also carved (supposedly for Queen Christina) the bust of the Saviour (Basilica of San Sebastiano fuori le Mura, Rome) and supervised the restoration of the historic Palazzo della Cancelleria, a direct commission from Pope Innocent XI. The latter commission is an outstanding confirmation of both Bernini's continuing professional reputation and good health of mind and body even in advanced old age, since the pope had chosen him over any number of talented younger architects plentiful in Rome, for this prestigious and most difficult assignment since, as his son Domenico points out, "deterioration of the palace had advanced to such an extent that the threat of its imminent collapse was quite apparent."

Shortly after the completion of the latter project, Bernini died in his home on 28 November 1680 and was buried, with little public fanfare, in the simple, unadorned Bernini family vault, along with his parents, in the Basilica of Santa Maria Maggiore. Though an elaborate funerary monument had once been planned (documented by a single extant sketch of c. 1670 by disciple Ludovico Gimignani), it was never built and Bernini remained with no permanent public acknowledgement of his life and career in Rome until 1898 when, on the anniversary of his birth, a simple plaque and small bust was affixed to the face of his home on the Via della Mercede, proclaiming "Here lived and died Gianlorenzo Bernini, a sovereign of art, before whom reverently bowed popes, princes, and a multitude of peoples."

== Personal life ==
In the late 1630s, Bernini had an affair with a married woman named Costanza (wife of his workshop assistant, Matteo Bonucelli, also called Bonarelli) and sculpted a bust of her (now in the Bargello, Florence) during the height of their romance. However, at some point, Costanza began at the same time an affair also with Bernini's younger brother, Luigi, who was Bernini's right-hand man in his studio. When Bernini found out about Costanza and his brother, in a fit of mad fury, he chased Luigi through the streets of Rome and into the basilica of Santa Maria Maggiore, almost ending his life. To punish his unfaithful mistress, Bernini had a servant go to the house of Costanza, where the servant slashed her face several times with a razor. The servant was later jailed, while Costanza herself was jailed for adultery. Bernini himself was exonerated by the pope, even though he had committed a crime in ordering the face-slashing.

Soon after, in May 1639, at age forty-one, Bernini wed a twenty-two-year-old Roman woman, Caterina Tezio, in an arranged marriage, under orders from Pope Urban. They had eleven children, including their youngest son Domenico Bernini, who would later be his father's first biographer. After his never-repeated episode of stalking and disfigurement by proxy, in his subsequent marriage, Bernini turned more sincerely to the practice of his faith, according to his early official biographers. Luigi, however, once again brought scandal to his family in 1670 by raping a young Bernini workshop assistant at the construction site of the 'Constantine' memorial in St. Peter's Basilica.

=== Personal residences ===
During his lifetime, Bernini lived in various residences throughout the city: principal among them, a palazzo right across from Santa Maria Maggiore and still extant at Via Liberiana 24, while his father was still alive; after his father died in 1629, Bernini moved the clan to the long-ago-demolished Santa Marta neighbourhood behind the apse of St. Peter's Basilica, which afforded him more convenient access to the Vatican Foundry and to his working studio also on the Vatican site. In 1639, Bernini bought property on the corner of the Via della Mercede and the Via del Collegio di Propaganda Fide in Rome. This gave him the distinction of being only one of two artists (the other is Pietro da Cortona) to be the proprietor of his own large palatial (though not sumptuous) residence, furnished as well with its own water supply. Bernini refurbished and expanded the existing palazzo on the Via della Mercede site, at what are now Nos. 11 and 12. (The building is sometimes referred to as "Palazzo Bernini", but that title more properly pertains to the Bernini family's later and larger home on Via del Corso, to which they moved in the early nineteenth century, now known as the Palazzo Manfroni-Bernini.) Bernini lived at No. 11 (extensively remodelled in the 19th century), where his working studio was located, as well as a large collection of works of art, his own and those of other artists.

It is imagined that it must have been galling for Bernini to witness through the windows of his dwelling the construction of the tower and dome of Sant'Andrea delle Fratte by his rival, Borromini and also the demolition of the chapel that he, Bernini, had designed at the Collegio di Propaganda Fide, which was later replaced by Borromini's chapel in 1660 (because the Collegio required a much larger chapel), but there is no documentation of this belief. The construction of Sant'Andrea, however, was completed by Bernini's close disciple, Mattia de Rossi, and it contains (to this day) the marble originals of two of Bernini's own angels executed by the master for the Ponte Sant'Angelo.

== Works of art, architecture, and mixed genre ==
=== Sculpture ===
Although he proved during his long lifetime to be a uomo universale, truly accomplished in so many areas of artistic production like Michelangelo and Leonardo da Vinci before him, Bernini was first and foremost a sculptor. He was trained from his earliest youth in that profession by his sculptor father, Pietro. The most recent and most comprehensive catalogue raisonné of his works of sculpture compiled by Maria Grazia Bernardini (Bernini: Catalogo delle sculture; Turin: Allemandi, 2022, 2 vols.) comprises 143 entries (not including those of debated attribution): they span Bernini's entire productive life, the first securely attributed work dating to 1610-1612 (the marble portrait bust of Bishop Giovanni Battista Santoni, for his tomb monument in Rome's Santa Prassede) and the last to 1679 (the marble Salvator Mundi bust, Basilica of San Sebastian fuori le Mura, Rome).

These many works range in size from small garden pieces of his earliest years (e.g., the Boy with a Dragon, 1617, Getty Museum, Los Angeles) to colossal works such as the Saint Longinus (1629–1638, St. Peter's Basilica, Rome). The majority are in marble, with other works being in bronze (most notably his various papal portrait busts and the monumental statues adorning his St. Peter's Baldachin (1624–1633) and Cathedra Petri (1656–1666) in St. Peter's Basilica. In virtually all cases, Bernini first produced numerous clay models as preparation for the final product; these models are now treasured as works of art in themselves, though, regrettably, only a minuscule percentage have survived from what must have been a great multitude.

The single largest sub-group of his sculptural production is represented by his portrait busts (either free-standing or incorporated into larger funerary monuments), mostly of his papal patrons or other ecclesiastical personages, as well as those few secular potentates who could afford the extraordinary expense of commissioning a portrait from Bernini (e.g., King Louis XIV, 1665, Palace of Versailles). Other large groups are represented by his religious works – statues of Biblical figures, angels, saints of the church, the crucified Christ, etc. – and his mythological figures either free-standing (such as his earliest masterpieces in the Galleria Borghese, Rome) or serving as ornaments in his complex fountain designs (such as the Fountain of the Four Rivers, 1647–1651, Piazza Navona, Rome).

Bernini's vast sculptural output can also be categorized according to the degree to which Bernini himself contributed to both the design and execution of the final product: to wit, some works are entirely of his own design and execution; others, of his design and partial but still substantial execution; while others of his design but with little or no actual execution by Bernini (such as the Madonna and Child, Carmelite Church of Saint Joseph, Paris). A further category contains those works commissioned from Bernini and fully credited to his workshop, but represent neither his direct design nor execution, only his signature stylistic inspiration (such as several of the angels on the Ponte Sant’ Angelo refurbished by Bernini, and all of the saints atop the two arms of the portico of Saint Peter's Square). In general, the more prestigious the commission and the earlier the commission in his career, the greater is Bernini's role in both design and execution, though notable exceptions exist to both of these general rules.

=== Architecture ===
Although his formal professional training was as a sculptor and his entrance into the field of architecture not of his own volition but that of Pope Urban VIII, Bernini had reached by the end of his life a status as one of the more influential architects of seventeenth-century Europe. He was certainly one of the most prolific over the many decades of his long, active life. Despite the fact that he rarely left the city of Rome and that all of his works of architecture were confined to the limits of the papal capital or to nearby towns, Bernini's influence was indeed European-wide: this is thanks both to the many engravings that disseminated his ideas across the continent and to the many non-Italian students of architecture who made long pilgrimages to Rome from all corners of Europe to study and be inspired by the ancient and modern masters, Bernini among them.

Bernini's architectural works include sacred and secular buildings and sometimes their urban settings and interiors. He made adjustments to existing buildings and designed new constructions. Among his most well-known works are St. Peter's Square (1656–1667), the piazza and colonnades in front of St. Peter's Basilica and the interior decoration of the basilica. Among his secular works are a number of Roman palaces: following the death of Carlo Maderno, he took over the supervision of the building works at the Palazzo Barberini from 1630 on which he worked with Francesco Borromini; the Palazzo Ludovisi (now Palazzo Montecitorio, started 1650); and the Palazzo Chigi (now Palazzo Chigi-Odescalchi, started 1664).

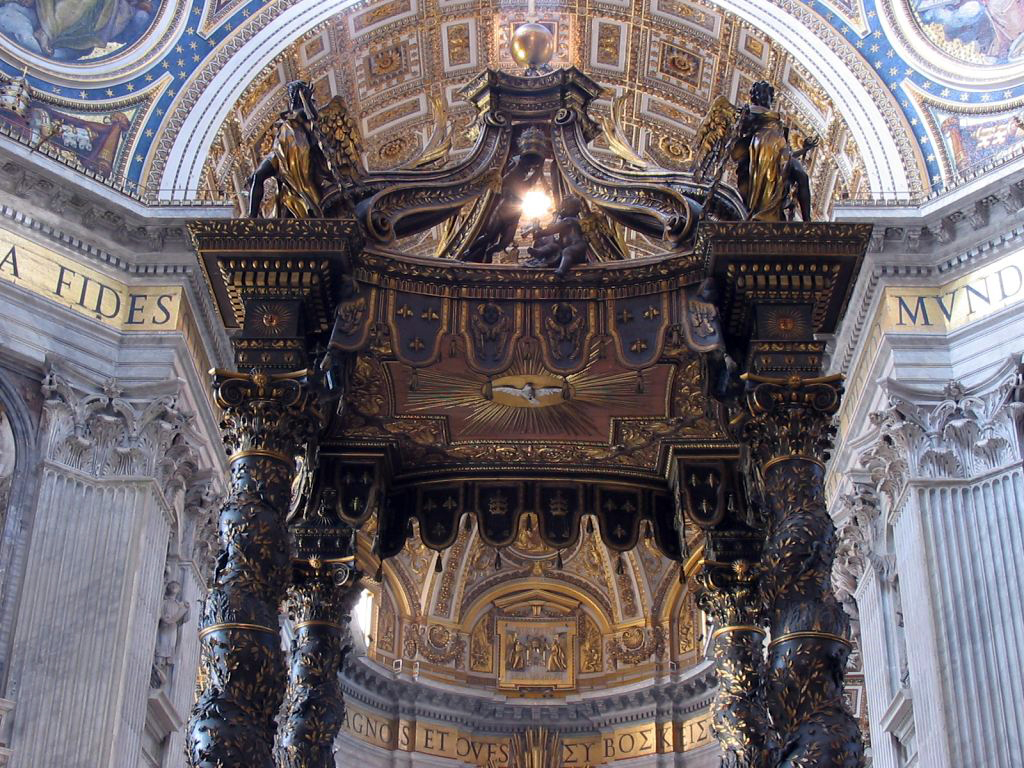
St. Peter's Baldachin, 1624–1633

His first architectural projects were the creation of the new façade and refurbishment of the interior of the church of Santa Bibiana (1624–1626) and the St. Peter's Baldachin (1624–1633), the bronze columned canopy over the high altar of St. Peter's Basilica. In 1629, and before the baldachin was complete, Urban VIII put him in charge of all the ongoing architectural works in the basilica, bestowing upon him the official rank of "Architect of St. Peter's." However, Bernini fell out of favour during the papacy of Innocent X Pamphili because of that pope's already-mentioned animosity towards the Barberini (and hence towards their clients, including Bernini) and the above-described failure of the bell towers designed and built by Bernini for St. Peter's Basilica. Never wholly without patronage during the Pamphili years and never losing his status as "Architect of St. Peter's," after Innocent's death in 1655 Bernini regained a major role in the decoration of the basilica with the Pope Alexander VII Chigi, leading to his design of the piazza and colonnade in front of St. Peter's. Further significant works by Bernini at the Vatican include the Scala Regia (1663–1666), the monumental grand stairway entrance to the Vatican Palace, and the Cathedra Petri, the Chair of Saint Peter, in the apse of St. Peter's, in addition to the Chapel of the Blessed Sacrament in the nave.

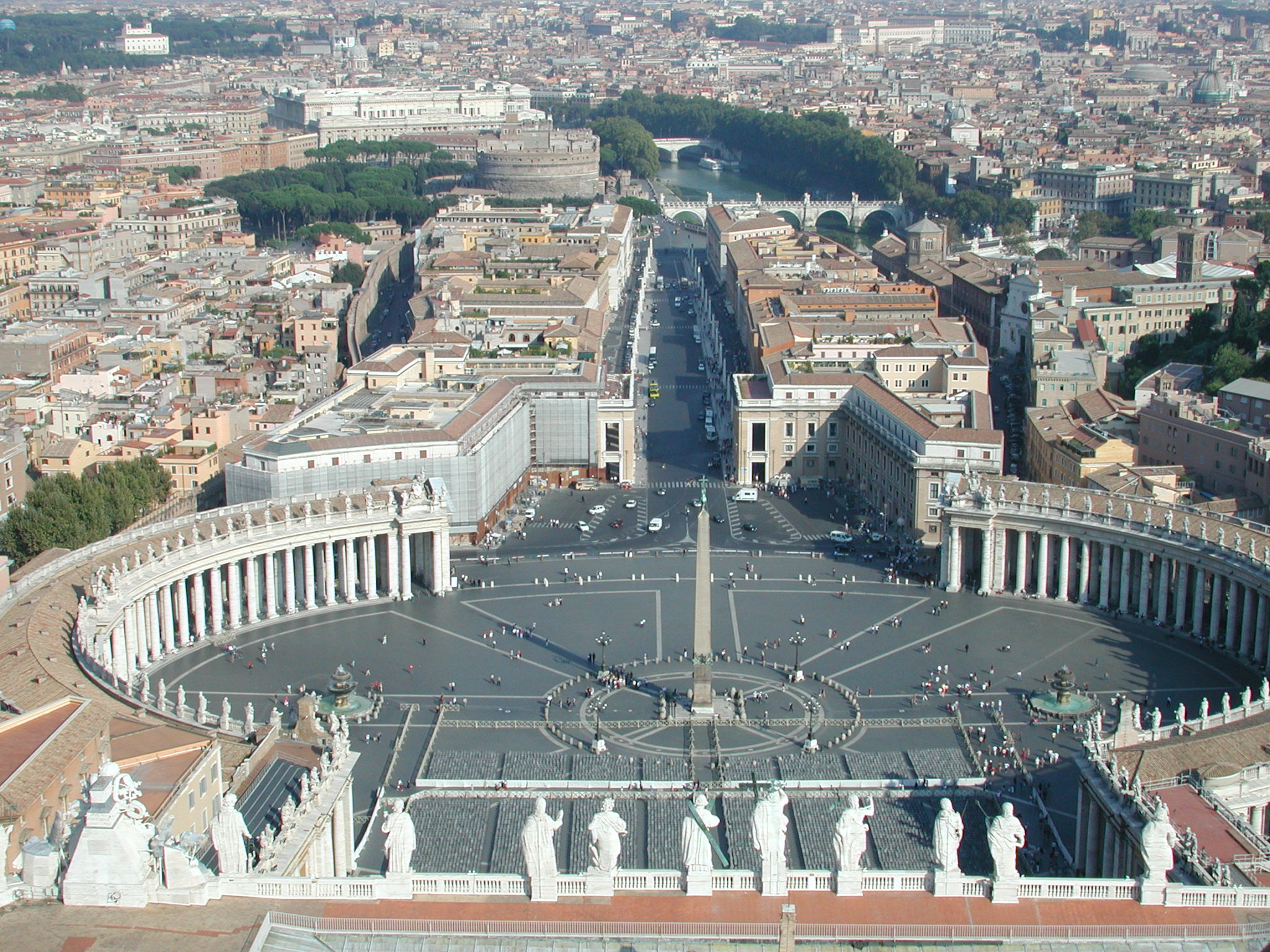
View of the piazza and colonnade in front of St. Peter's Basilica

Bernini did not build many churches ex novo, from the ground up; rather, his efforts were concentrated on pre-existing structures, such as the restored church of Santa Bibiana and, in particular, St. Peter's. He fulfilled three commissions for new churches in Rome and nearby small towns. Best known is the small but richly ornamented oval church of Sant'Andrea al Quirinale, done (beginning in 1658) for the Jesuit novitiate, representing one of the rare works of his hand with which Bernini's son, Domenico, reports that his father was truly and very pleased. Bernini also designed churches in Castelgandolfo (San Tommaso da Villanova, 1658–1661) and Ariccia (Santa Maria Assunta, 1662–1664), and was responsible for the re-modelling of the Sanctuary of Santa Maria di Galloro, Ariccia, endowing it with a majestic new façade.

When Bernini was invited to Paris in 1665 to prepare works for Louis XIV, he presented designs for the east façade of the Louvre Palace, but his projects were ultimately turned down in favour of the more sober and classic proposals of a committee consisting of three Frenchmen: Louis Le Vau, Charles Le Brun, and the doctor and amateur architect Claude Perrault, signalling the waning influence of Italian artistic hegemony in France. Bernini's projects were essentially rooted in the Italian Baroque urbanist tradition of relating public buildings to their settings, often leading to innovative architectural expression in urban spaces like piazze or squares. However, by this time, the French absolutist monarchy now preferred the classicizing monumental severity of the Louvre's facade, no doubt with the added political bonus that it had been designed by Frenchmen. The final version did, however, include Bernini's feature of a flat roof behind a Palladian balustrade.

=== Fountains ===
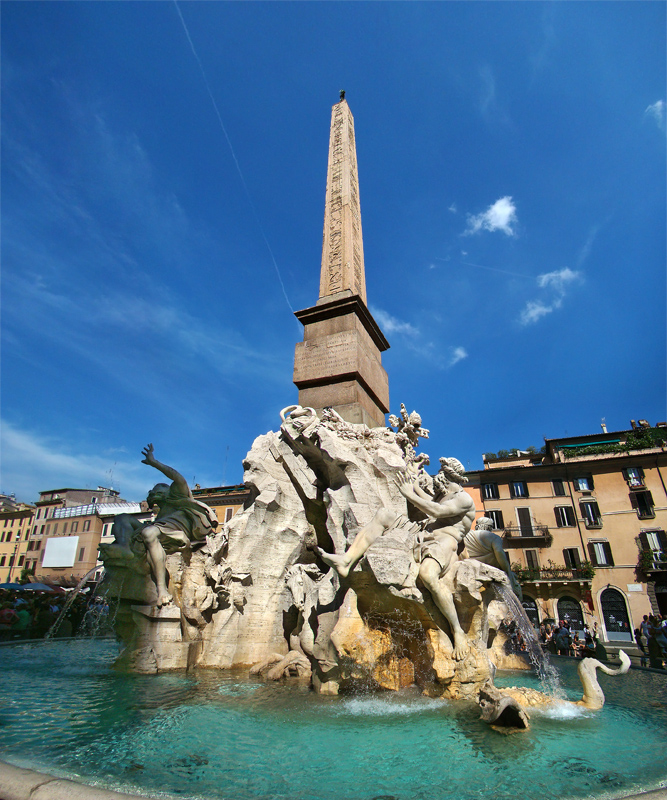
Fontana dei Quattro Fiumi

True to the decorative dynamism of the Baroque, which loved the aesthetic pleasure and emotional delight afforded by the sight and sound of water in motion, some of Bernini's most notable creations were his Roman fountains, which were both utilitarian public works and personal monuments to their patrons, papal or otherwise. His first fountain, the 'Barcaccia' (commissioned in 1627, finished 1629) at the foot of the Spanish Steps, cleverly surmounted a challenge that Bernini was to face in several other fountain commissions, the low water pressure in many parts of Rome (Roman fountains were all driven by gravity alone), creating a low-lying flat boat that was able to take greatest advantage of the small amount of water available. Another example is the long-ago dismantled "Woman Drying Her Hair" fountain that Bernini created for the no-longer-extant Villa Barberini ai Bastioni on the edge of the Janiculum Hill overlooking St. Peter's Basilica.

His other fountains include the Fountain of the Triton, or Fontana del Tritone in Piazza Barberini (celebrated in Ottorino Respighi's Fountains of Rome), and the nearby Barberini Fountain of the Bees, the Fontana delle Api. The Fountain of the Four Rivers, or Fontana dei Quattro Fiumi, in the Piazza Navona is an exhilarating masterpiece of spectacle and political allegory in which Bernini again brilliantly overcame the problem of the piazza's low water pressure creating the illusion of an abundance of water that in reality did not exist. An oft-repeated, but false, anecdote tells that one of Bernini's river gods defers his gaze in disapproval of the façade of Sant'Agnese in Agone (designed by the talented, but less politically successful, rival Francesco Borromini), impossible because the fountain was built several years before the façade of the church was completed. Bernini also provided the design for the statue of the Moor in La Fontana del Moro in Piazza Navona (1653).

=== Tomb monuments and other works ===
Another major category of Bernini's activity was that of the tomb monument, a genre on which his distinctive new style exercised a decisive and long-enduring influence; included in this category are his tombs for Popes Urban VIII and Alexander VII (both in St. Peter's Basilica), Cardinal Domenico Pimentel (Santa Maria sopra Minerva, Rome, design only), and Matilda of Canossa (St. Peter's Basilica). Related to the tomb monument is the funerary memorial, of which Bernini executed several (including that, most notably, of Maria Raggi (Santa Maria sopra Minerva, Rome) also of greatly innovative style and long enduring influence.

Among his smaller commissions, although not mentioned by either of his earliest biographers, Baldinucci or Domenico Bernini, the Elephant and Obelisk is a sculpture located near the Pantheon, in the Piazza della Minerva, in front of the Dominican church of Santa Maria sopra Minerva. Pope Alexander VII decided that he wanted a small ancient Egyptian obelisk (that was discovered beneath the piazza) to be erected on the same site, and in 1665 he commissioned Bernini to create a sculpture to support the obelisk. The sculpture of an elephant bearing the obelisk on its back was executed by one of Bernini's students, Ercole Ferrata, upon a design by his master, and finished in 1667. An inscription on the base relates the Egyptian goddess Isis and the Roman goddess Minerva to the Virgin Mary, who supposedly supplanted those pagan goddesses and to whom the church is dedicated. Bernini's elephants are highly realistic as Bernini had twice the opportunity to see a live elephant: Don Diego in 1630 and Hansken in 1655. A popular anecdote concerns the elephant's smile: to find out why it is smiling, legend claims, the viewer must examine the rear end of the animal and notice that its muscles are (supposedly) tensed and its tail is shifted to the left as if it were defecating. The animal's rear is pointed directly at one of the headquarters of the Dominican Order, housing the offices of its Inquisitors as well as the office of Father Giuseppe Paglia, a Dominican friar who was one of the main antagonists of Bernini, as a final salute and last word.

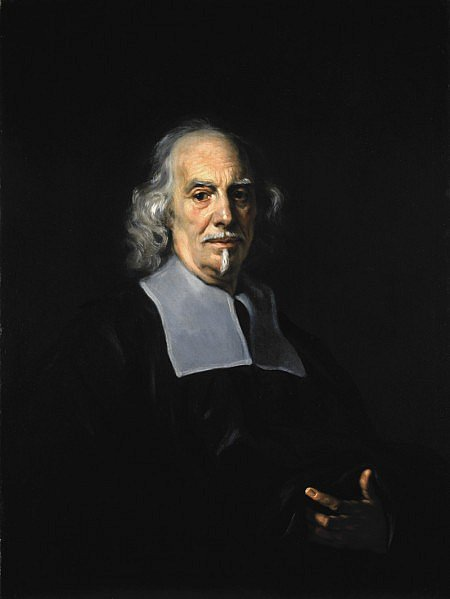
Gian Lorenzo Bernini in 1665, painted by Giovanni Battista Gaulli

Among his minor commissions for non-Roman patrons or venues, in 1677 Bernini worked along with Ercole Ferrata to create a fountain for the Lisbon palace of the Portuguese nobleman, Luís de Meneses, 3rd Count of Ericeira: copying his earlier fountains, Bernini supplied the design of the fountain sculpted by Ferrata, featuring Neptune with four tritons around a basin. The fountain has survived and, since 1945, has been outside the precincts of the gardens of the Palace of Queluz, several miles outside of Lisbon.

=== Paintings, drawings, and work for the theatre ===
Bernini would have studied painting as a normal part of his artistic training begun in early adolescence under the guidance of his father, Pietro, in addition to some further training in the studio of the Florentine painter, Cigoli. His earliest activity as a painter was probably no more than a sporadic diversion practised mainly in his youth, until the mid-1620s, that is, the beginning of the pontificate of Pope Urban VIII (reigned 1623–1644) who ordered Bernini to study painting in greater earnest because the pontiff wanted him to decorate the Benediction Loggia of St. Peter's. The latter commission was never executed, most likely because the required large-scale narrative compositions were simply beyond Bernini's ability as a painter. According to his early biographers, Baldinucci and Domenico Bernini, Bernini completed at least 150 canvases, mostly in the decades of the 1620s and 30s, but currently, there are no more than 35–40 surviving paintings that can be confidently attributed to his hand. The extant, securely attributed works are mostly portraits, seen close up and set against an empty background, employing a confident, indeed brilliant, painterly brushstroke (similar to that of his Spanish contemporary Velázquez), free from any trace of pedantry, and a very limited palette of mostly warm, subdued colours with deep chiaroscuro. His work was immediately sought after by major collectors. Most noteworthy among these extant works are several, vividly penetrating self-portraits (all dating to the mid-1620s – early 1630s), especially that in the Uffizi Gallery, Florence, purchased during Bernini's lifetime by Cardinal Leopoldo de' Medici. Bernini's Apostles Andrew and Thomas in London's National Gallery is the sole canvas by the artist whose attribution, approximate date of execution (c. 1625) and provenance (the Barberini Collection, Rome) are securely known.

As for Bernini's drawings, about 350 still exist; but this represents a minuscule percentage of the drawings he would have created in his lifetime; these include rapid sketches relating to major sculptural or architectural commissions, presentation drawings given as gifts to his patrons and aristocratic friends, and exquisite, fully finished portraits, such as those of Agostino Mascardi (Ecole des Beaux-Arts, Paris) and Scipione Borghese and Sisinio Poli (both in New York's Morgan Library).

Another area of artistic endeavour to which Bernini devoted much of his spare time between major commissions and which earned him further popular acclaim was that of the theatre. For many years (especially during the reign of Pope Urban VIII, 1623–44), Bernini created a long series of theatrical productions in which he simultaneously served as scriptwriter, stage director, actor, scenographer, and special-effects technician. These plays were mostly Carnival comedies (held often in his own home), which drew large audiences and much attention and in which the artist satirized contemporary Roman life (especially court life) with his pungent witticisms. At the same time, they also dazzled spectators with daring displays of special effects such as the flooding of the Tiber river or a controlled but very real fiery blaze, as reported by his son Domenico's biography. However, although there is much disparate, scattered documentation showing that all of this theatrical work was not simply a limited or passing diversion for Bernini, the only extant remains of these endeavours are the partial script of one play and a drawing of a sunset (or sunrise) relating to the creation of a special effect on stage.

== Influence and post-mortem reputation ==
=== Disciples, collaborators, and rivals ===
Among the many sculptors who worked under his supervision (even though most were accomplished masters in their own right) were Luigi Bernini, Stefano Speranza, Giuliano Finelli, Andrea Bolgi, Giacomo Antonio Fancelli, Lazzaro Morelli, Francesco Baratta, Ercole Ferrata, the Frenchman Niccolò Sale, Giovanni Antonio Mari, Antonio Raggi, and François Duquesnoy. But his most trusted right-hand man in sculpture was Giulio Cartari, while in architecture it was Mattia de Rossi, both of whom travelled to Paris with Bernini to assist him in his work there for King Louis XIV. Other architect disciples include Giovanni Battista Contini and Carlo Fontana, while Swedish architect, Nicodemus Tessin the Younger, who visited Rome twice after Bernini's death, was also much influenced by him.

Among his rivals in architecture were, above all, Francesco Borromini and Pietro da Cortona. Early in their careers, they had all worked at the same time at the Palazzo Barberini, initially under Carlo Maderno and, following his death, under Bernini. Later on, however, they were in competition for commissions, and fierce rivalries developed, particularly between Bernini and Borromini. In sculpture, Bernini competed with Alessandro Algardi and François Duquesnoy, but they both died decades earlier than Bernini (respectively in 1654 and 1643), leaving Bernini effectively with no sculptor of his same exalted status in Rome. Francesco Mochi can also be included among Bernini's significant rivals, though he was not as accomplished in his art as Bernini, Algardi or Duquesnoy.

There was also a succession of painters (the so-called 'pittori berniniani') who, working under the master's close guidance and at times according to his designs, produced canvases and frescos that were integral components of Bernini's larger multi-media works such as churches and chapels: Carlo Pellegrini, Guido Ubaldo Abbatini, Frenchman Guillaume Courtois (Guglielmo Cortese, known as 'Il Borgognone'), Ludovico Gimignani, and Giovanni Battista Gaulli (who, thanks to Bernini, was granted the prized commission to fresco the vault of the Jesuit mother Church of the Gesù by Bernini's friend, Jesuit Superior General, Giovanni Paolo Oliva).

As far as Caravaggio is concerned, in all the voluminous Bernini sources, his name appears only once: this occurs in the Chantelou Diary in which the French diarist claims that Bernini agreed with his disparaging remark about Caravaggio (specifically his Fortune Teller that had just arrived from Italy as a Pamphilj gift to King Louis XIV). Yet, how much Bernini really scorned Caravaggio's art is a matter of debate, whereas arguments have been made in favour of a strong influence of Caravaggio on Bernini. Bernini would, of course, have heard much about Caravaggio and seen many of his works not only because in Rome at the time such contact was impossible to avoid, but also because during his own lifetime, Caravaggio had come to the favourable attention of Bernini's own early patrons, both the Borghese and the Barberini. Indeed, much like Caravaggio, Bernini often devised strikingly bold compositions, akin to theatrical tableaux that arrest the scene at its dramatic key moment (such as in his Ecstasy of Saint Teresa in Santa Maria della Vittoria). And again much like Caravaggio, he made full and skillful use of theatrical lighting as an important aesthetic and metaphorical device in his religious settings, often employing hidden light sources that could intensify the focus of religious worship or enhance the dramatic moment of a sculptural narrative.

=== First biographies ===
The most important primary source for the life of Bernini is the biography written by his youngest son, Domenico, entitled Vita del Cavalier Gio. Lorenzo Bernino, published in 1713 though first compiled in the last years of his father's life (c. 1675–80). Filippo Baldinucci's Life of Bernini was published in 1682, and a meticulous private journal, the Diary of the Cavaliere Bernini's Visit to France, was kept by the Frenchman Paul Fréart de Chantelou during the artist's four-month stay from June through October 1665 at the court of King Louis XIV. Also, there is a short biographical narrative, The Vita Brevis of Gian Lorenzo Bernini, written by his eldest son, Monsignor Pietro Filippo Bernini, in the mid-1670s.

Until the late 20th century, it was generally believed that two years after Bernini's death, Queen Christina of Sweden, then living in Rome, commissioned Filippo Baldinucci to write his biography, which was published in Florence in 1682. However, recent research now strongly suggests that it was in fact Bernini's sons (and specifically the eldest son, Mons. Pietro Filippo) who commissioned the biography from Baldinucci sometime in the late 1670s, with the intent of publishing it while their father was still alive. This would mean that first, the commission did not at all originate in Queen Christina who would have merely lent her name as patron (in order to hide the fact that the biography was coming directly from the family) and secondly, that Baldinucci's narrative was largely derived from some pre-publication version of Domenico Bernini's much longer biography of his father, as evidenced by the extremely large amount of text repeated verbatim (there is no other explanation, otherwise, for the massive amount of verbatim repetition, and it is known that Baldinucci routinely copied verbatim material for his artists' biographies supplied by family and friends of his subjects). As the most detailed account and the only one coming directly from a member of the artist's immediate family, Domenico's biography, despite having been published later than Baldinucci's, therefore represents the earliest and more important full-length biographical source of Bernini's life, even though it idealizes its subject and whitewashes a number of less-than-flattering facts about his life and personality.

=== Legacy ===
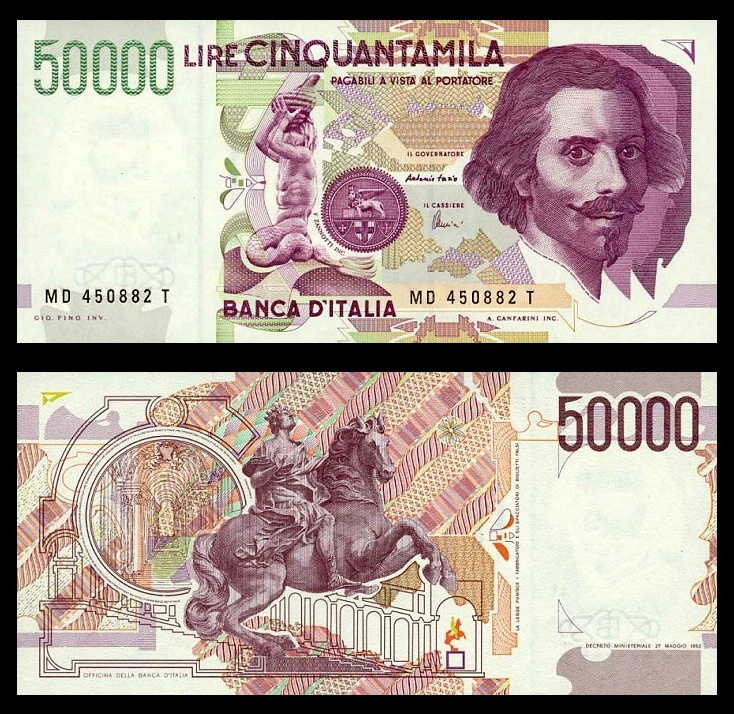
Bernini as depicted on the Banca d'Italia 50,000 lire banknote in the 1980s and 90s.

As one Bernini scholar has summarized, "Perhaps the most important result of all of the [Bernini] studies and research of these past few decades has been to restore to Bernini his status as the great, principal protagonist of Baroque art, the one who was able to create undisputed masterpieces, to interpret in an original and genial fashion the new spiritual sensibilities of the age, to give the city of Rome an entirely new face, and to unify the [artistic] language of the times." Few artists have had as decisive an influence on the physical appearance and emotional tenor of a city as Bernini had on Rome. Maintaining a controlling influence over all aspects of his many and large commissions and over those who aided him in executing them, he was able to carry out his unique and harmoniously uniform vision over decades of work with his long and productive life Although by the end of Bernini's life there was in motion a decided reaction against his brand of what was considered flamboyant Baroque, the fact is that sculptors and architects continued to study his works and be influenced by them for several more decades (Nicola Salvi's later Trevi Fountain [inaugurated in 1735] is a prime example of the enduring post-mortem influence of Bernini on the city's landscape).

In the eighteenth century, Bernini and virtually all Baroque artists fell from favour in the neoclassical criticism of the Baroque, that criticism aimed above all at the latter's supposedly extravagant (and thus illegitimate) departures from the pristine, sober models of Greek and Roman antiquity. It is only from the late nineteenth century that art historical scholarship, in seeking a more objective understanding of artistic output within the specific cultural context in which it was produced, without the a priori prejudices of neoclassicism, began to recognize Bernini's achievements and slowly began to restore his artistic reputation. However, the reaction against Bernini and the too-sensual (and therefore "decadent"), too-emotionally charged Baroque in the larger culture (especially in non-Catholic countries of northern Europe, and particularly in Victorian England) remained in effect until well into the twentieth century (most notable are the public disparagement of Bernini by Francesco Milizia, Joshua Reynolds, and Jacob Burkhardt).

Among the influential 18th- and 19th-century figures who despised Bernini's art was also and most prominently Johann Joachim Winckelmann (1717–68), considered by many the father of the modern discipline of art history. For the neo-classicist Winkelmann, the one true, laudable "high style" of art was characterized by noble simplicity joined with a quiet grandeur that eschewed any exuberance of emotion, whether positive or negative, as exemplified by ancient Greek sculpture. The Baroque Bernini, instead, represented the opposite of this ideal and, moreover, according to Winkelmann, had been "utterly corrupted...by a vulgar flattery of the coarse and uncultivated, in attempting to render everything more intelligible to them." Another major condemning voice is that of Colen Campbell (1676–1729), who on the very first page of his monumental and influential Vitruvius Britannicus (London, 1715, Introduction, vol. 1, p. 1) singles out Bernini and Borromini as examples of the utter degradation of post-Palladian architecture in Italy: "With (the great Palladio) the great Manner and exquisite Taste of Building is lost; for the Italians can no more now relish the Antique Simplicity, but are entirely employed in capricious Ornaments, which must at last end in the Gothick. For Proof of this Assertion, I appeal to the Productions of the last Century: How affected and licentious are the Works of Bernini and Fontana? How wildly Extravagant are the Designs of Boromini, who has endeavoured to debauch Mankind with his odd and chimerical Beauties…?" Accordingly, most of the popular eighteenth- and nineteenth-century tourist guides to Rome all but ignore Bernini and his work, or treat it with disdain, as in the case of the best-selling Walks in Rome (22 editions between 1871 and 1925) by Augustus J.C. Hare, who describes the angels on the Ponte Sant'Angelo as 'Bernini's Breezy Maniacs.'

But now in the twenty-first century, Bernini and his Baroque have been restored to favour, both critical and popular. Since the anniversary year of his birth in 1998, there have been numerous Bernini exhibitions throughout the world, especially in Europe and North America, on all aspects of his work, expanding our knowledge of his work and its influence. In the late twentieth century, Bernini was commemorated on the front of the Bank of Italy's 50,000 lire banknote in the 1980s and 90s (before Italy switched to the euro), with the back showing his equestrian statue of Constantine. Another sign of Bernini's enduring reputation came in the decision by architect I.M. Pei to insert a copy in lead of his King Louis XIV Equestrian statue as the sole ornamental element in his massive modernist redesign of the entrance plaza to the Louvre Museum, completed in 1989, and featuring the giant Louvre Pyramid in glass. In 2000 best-selling novelist, Dan Brown, made Bernini and several of his Roman works, the centrepiece of his political thriller, Angels & Demons, while British novelist Iain Pears made a missing Bernini bust the centrepiece of his best-selling murder mystery, The Bernini Bust (2003). There is even a crater near the south pole of Mercury named after Bernini (in 1976).

== Gallery ==
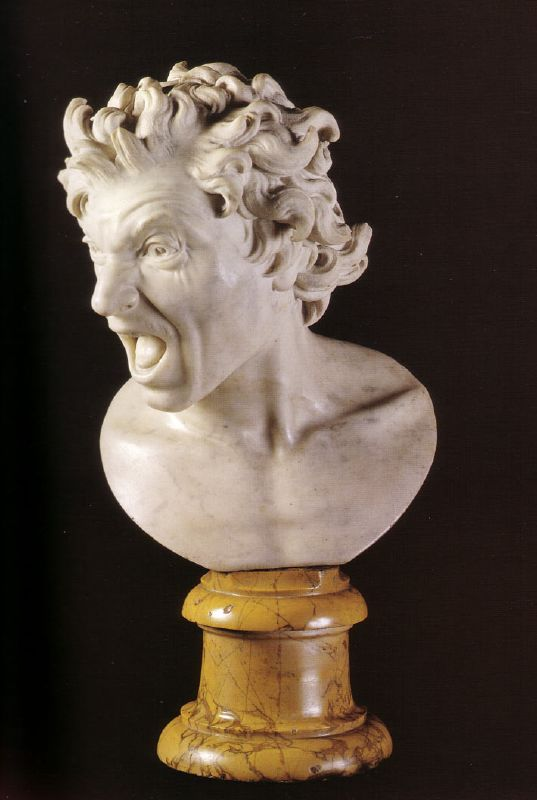
Damned Soul

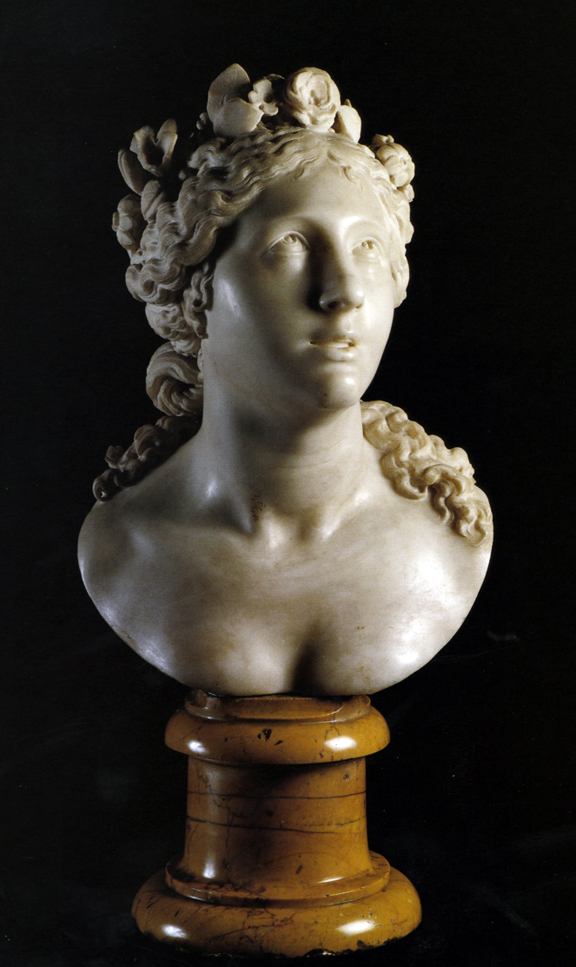
Blessed Soul

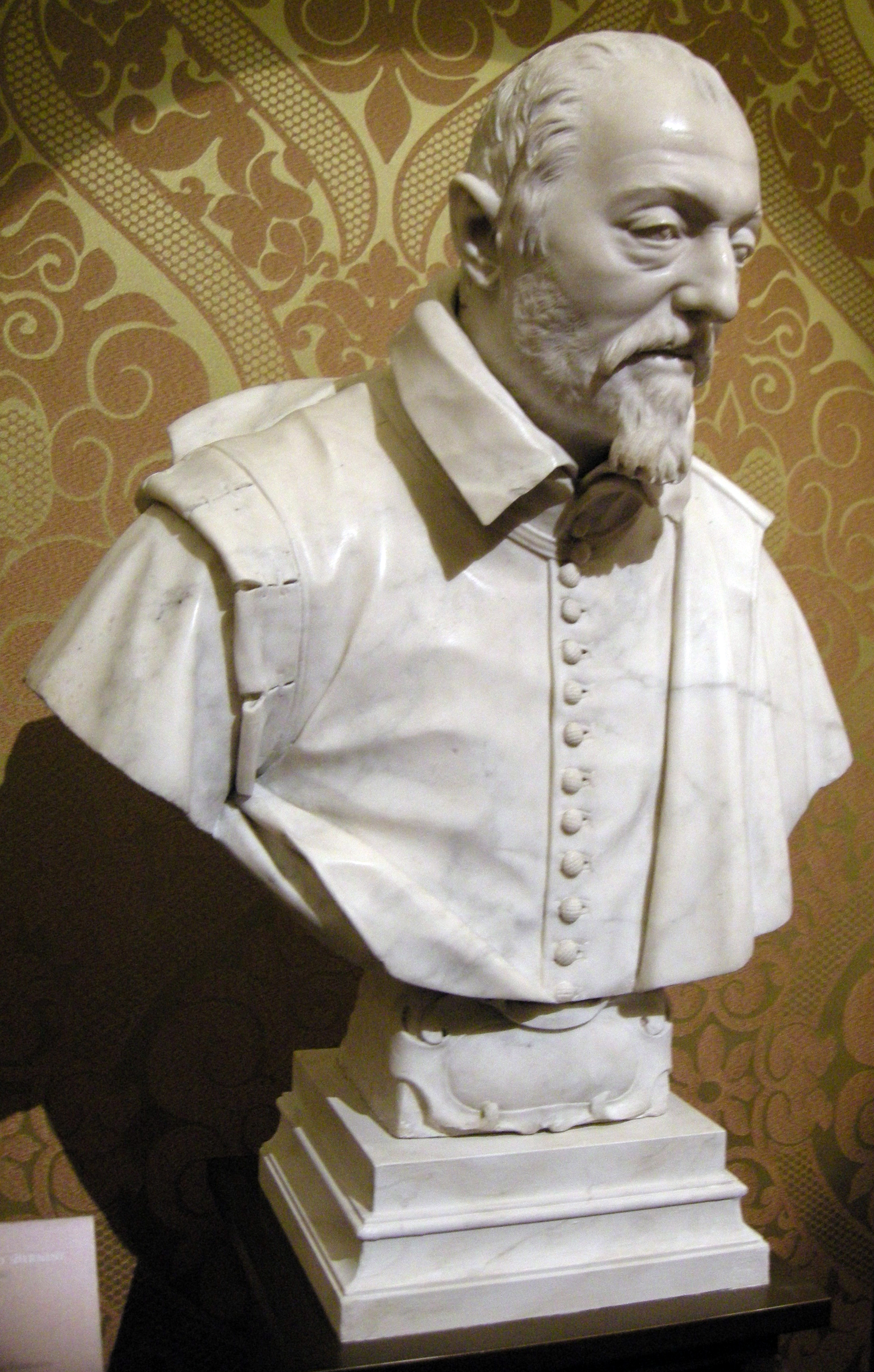
Bust of Antonio Cepparelli

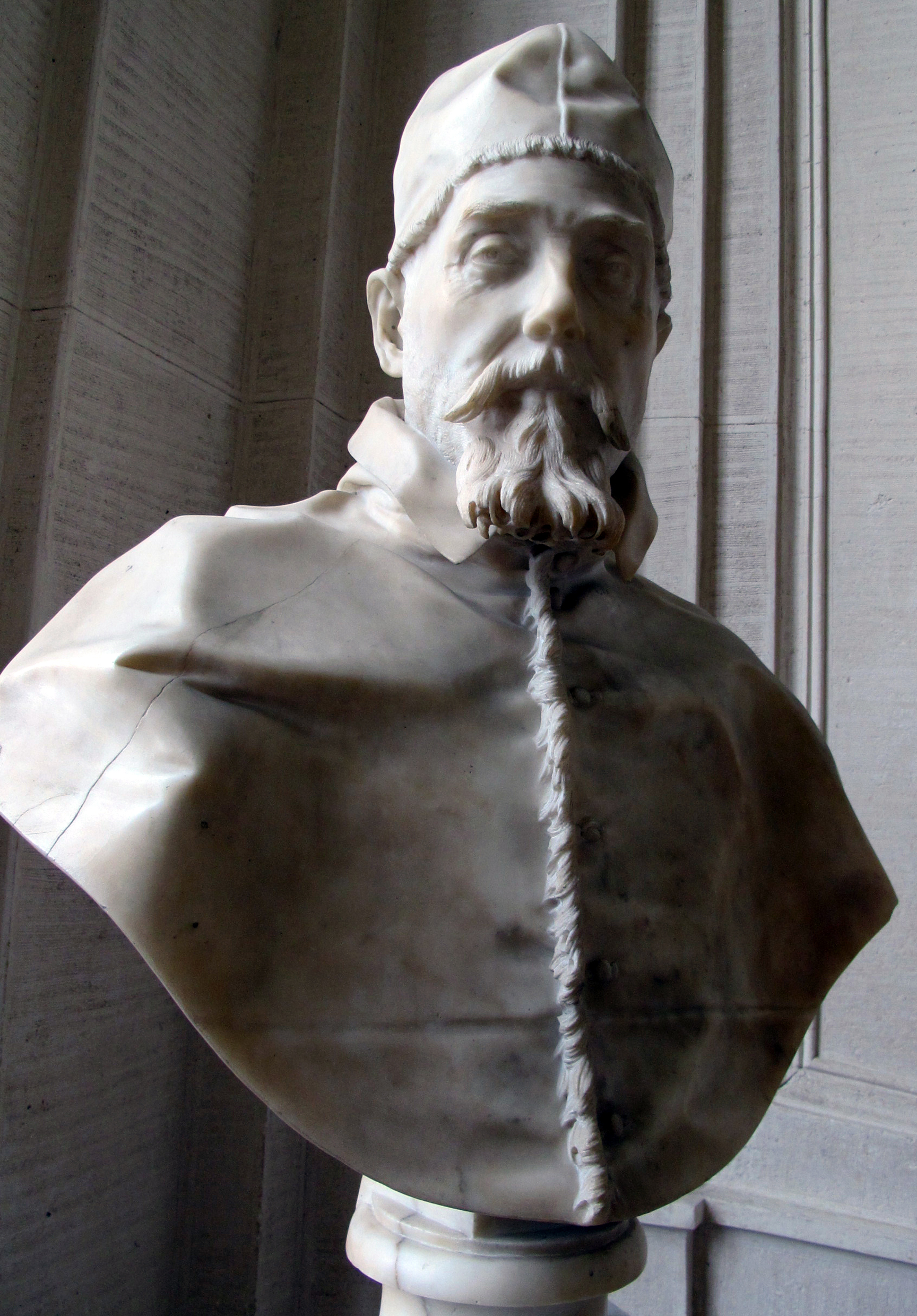
Bust of Pope Urban VIII

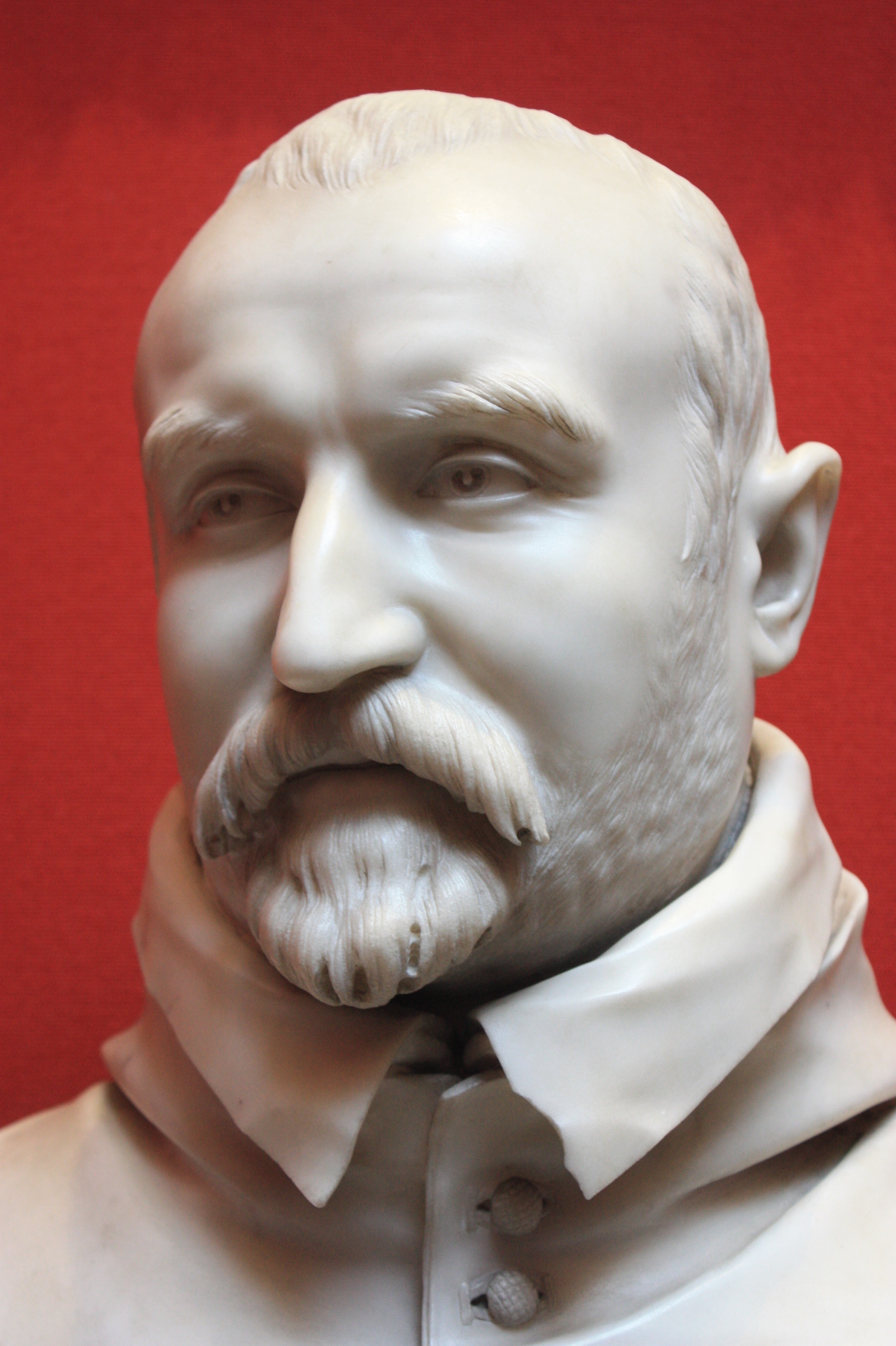
Bust of Monsignor Carlo Antonio dal Pozzo

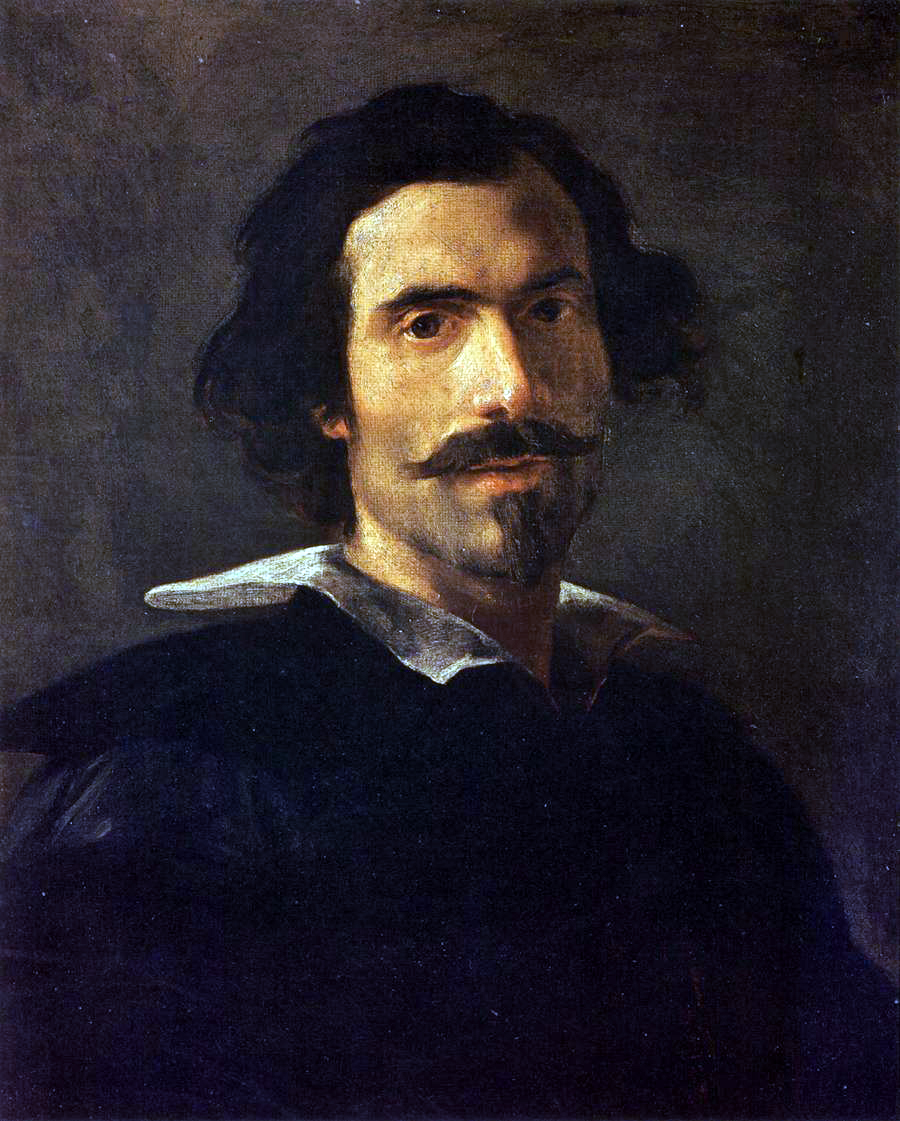
Self-portrait

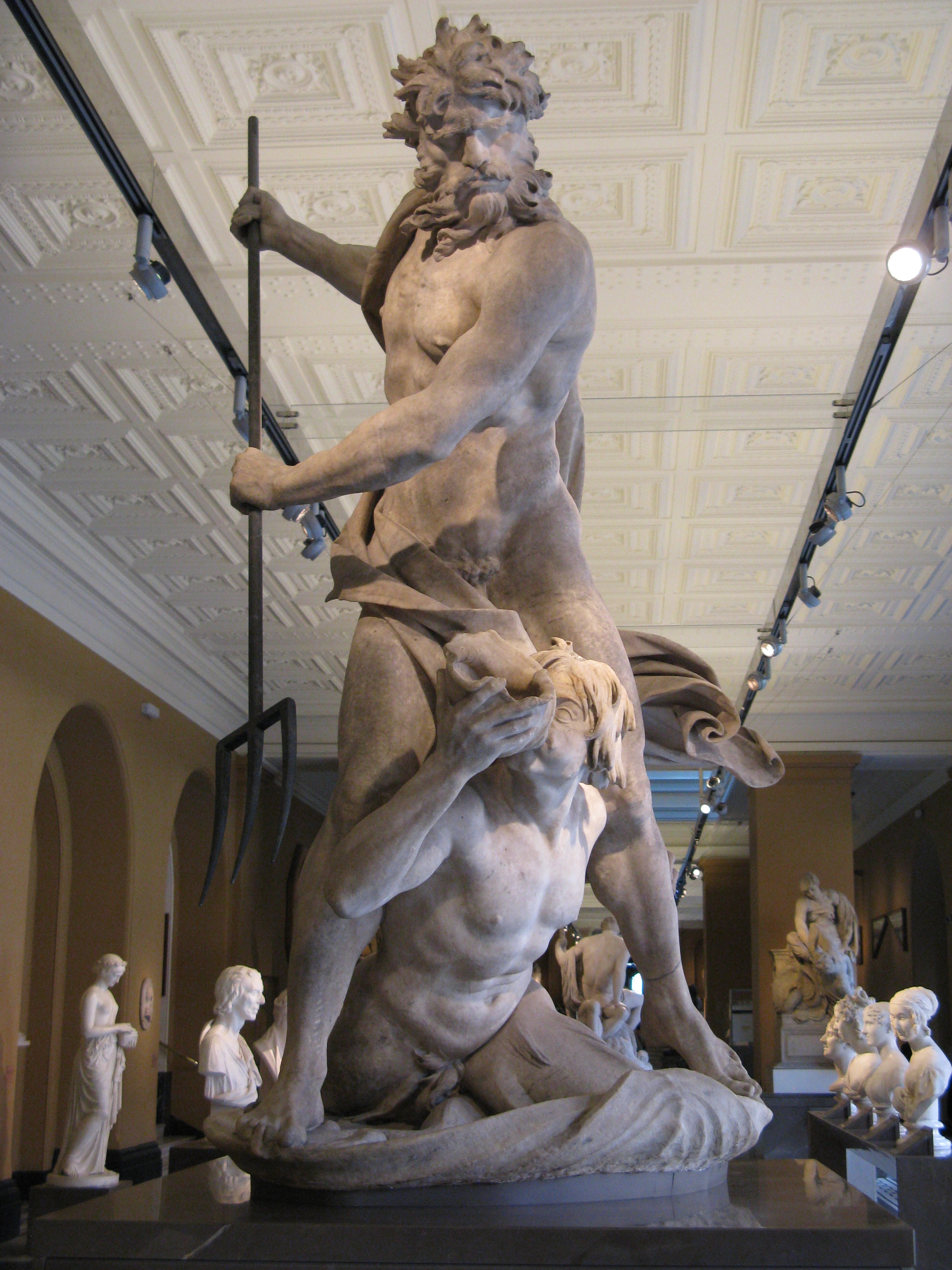
Neptune and Triton

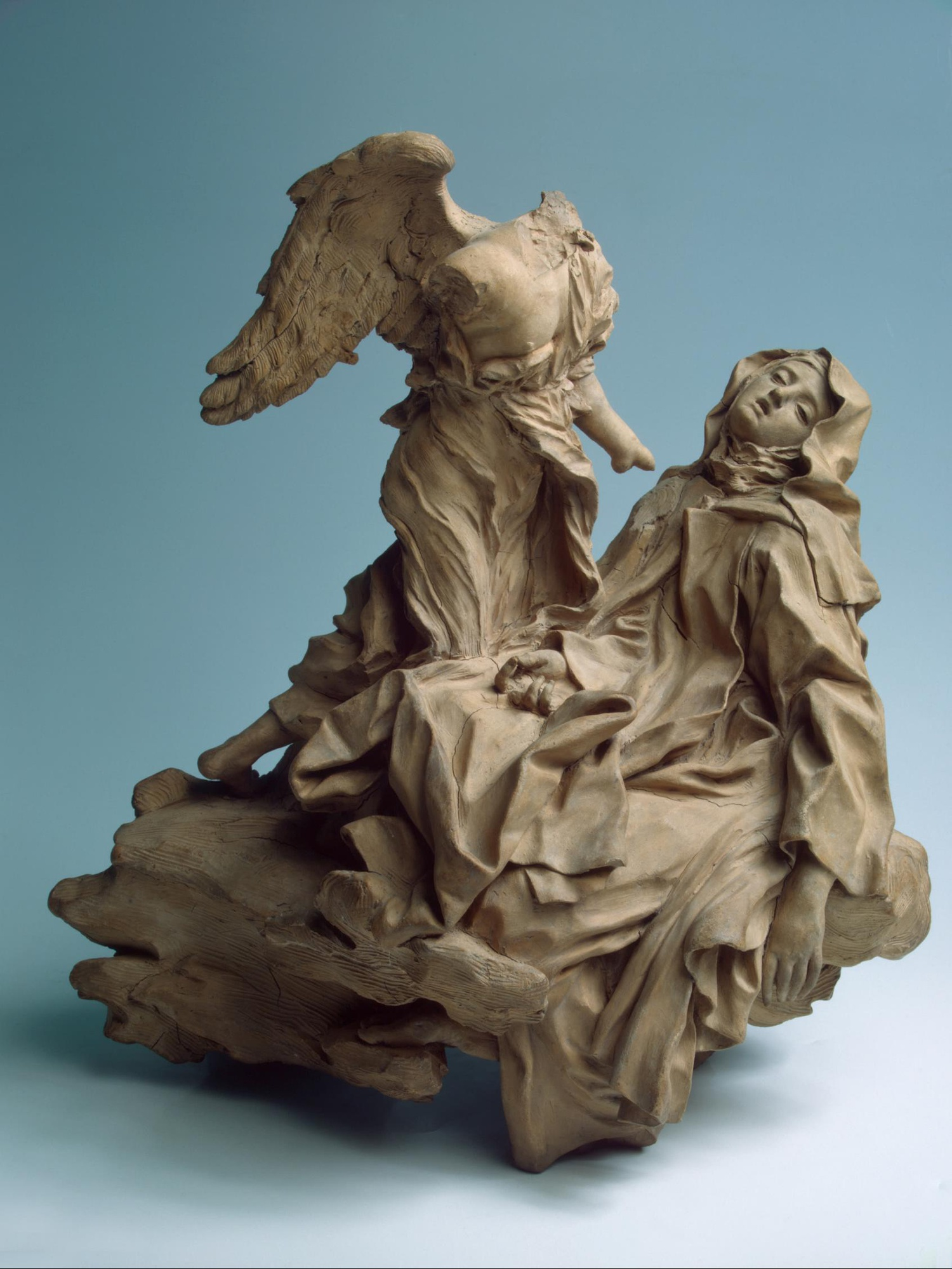
Ecstasy of St. Teresa. Terracotta Modello
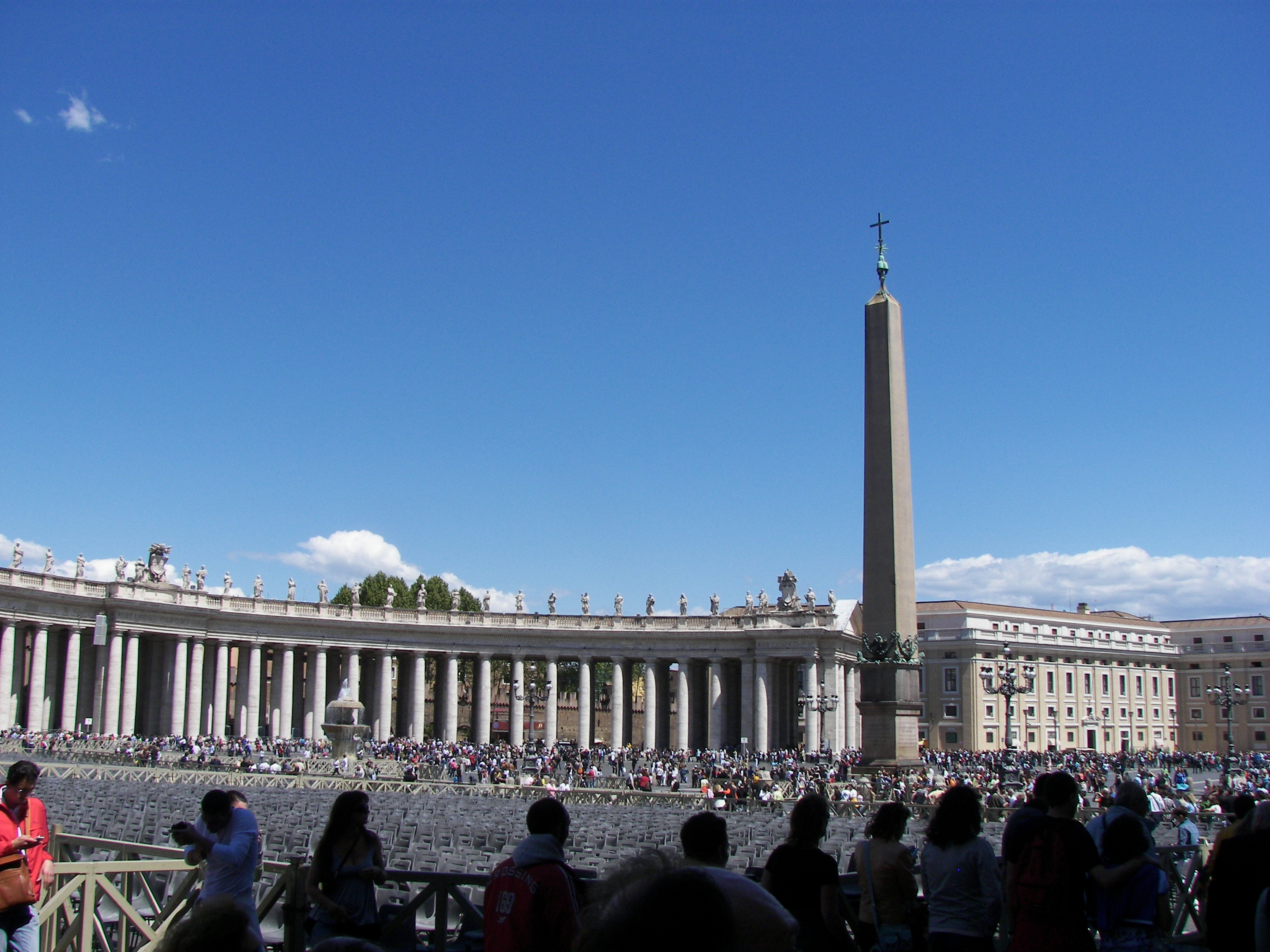
St. Peter's colonnade

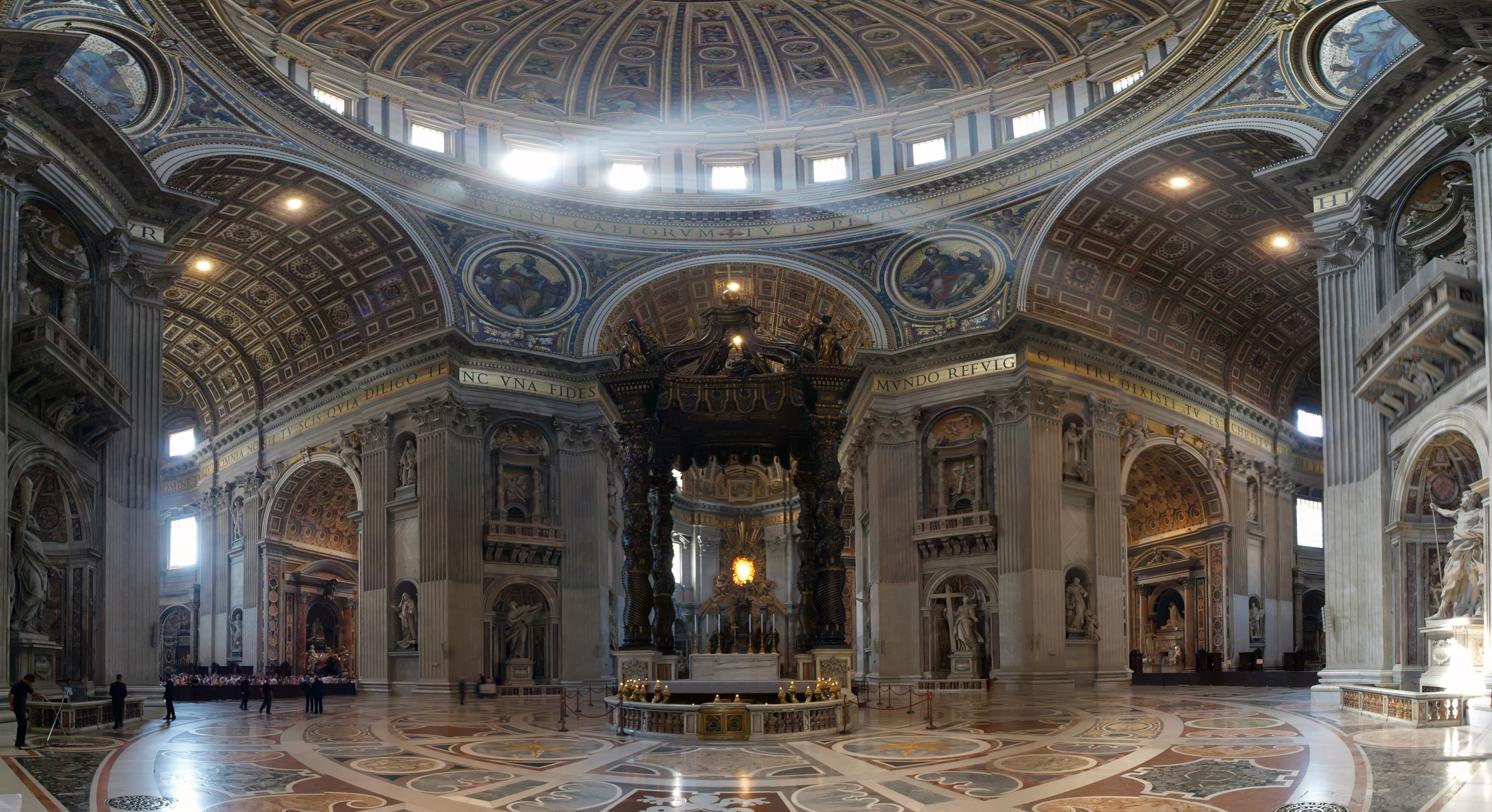
St. Peter's baldachin

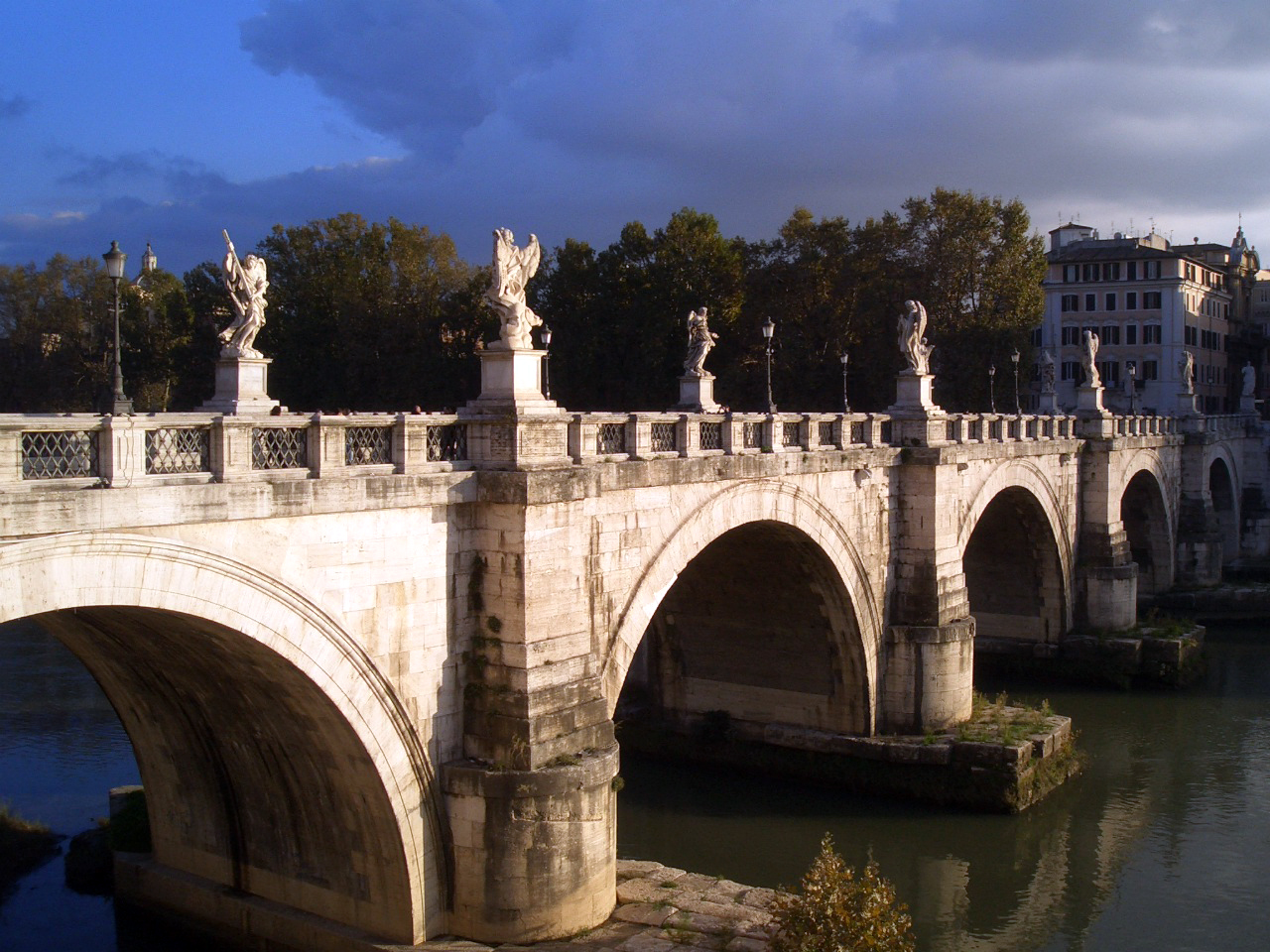
Ponte St. Angelo angels

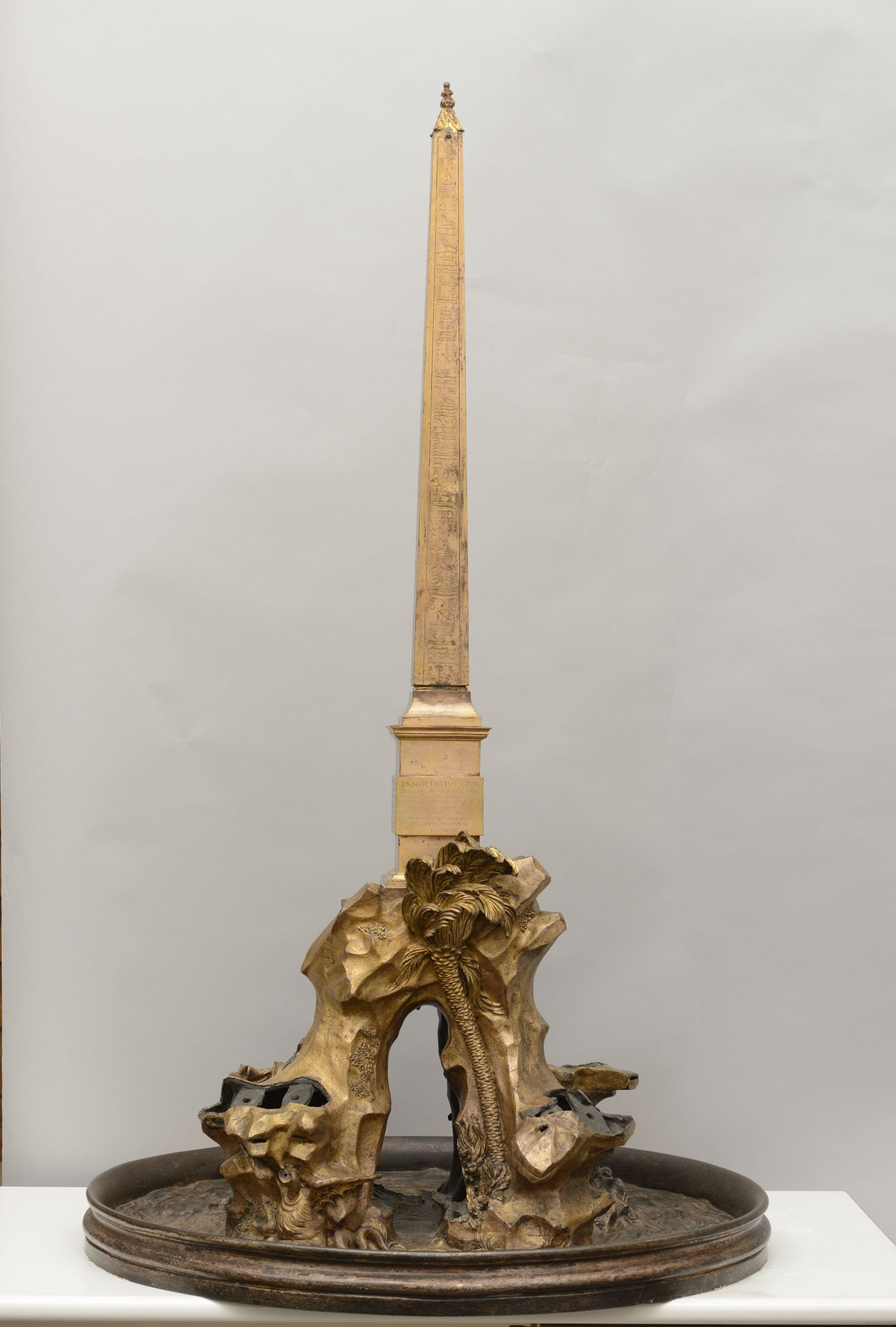
Fontana dei Quattro fiumi. Bronze.

== Selected works ==
=== Sculpture ===
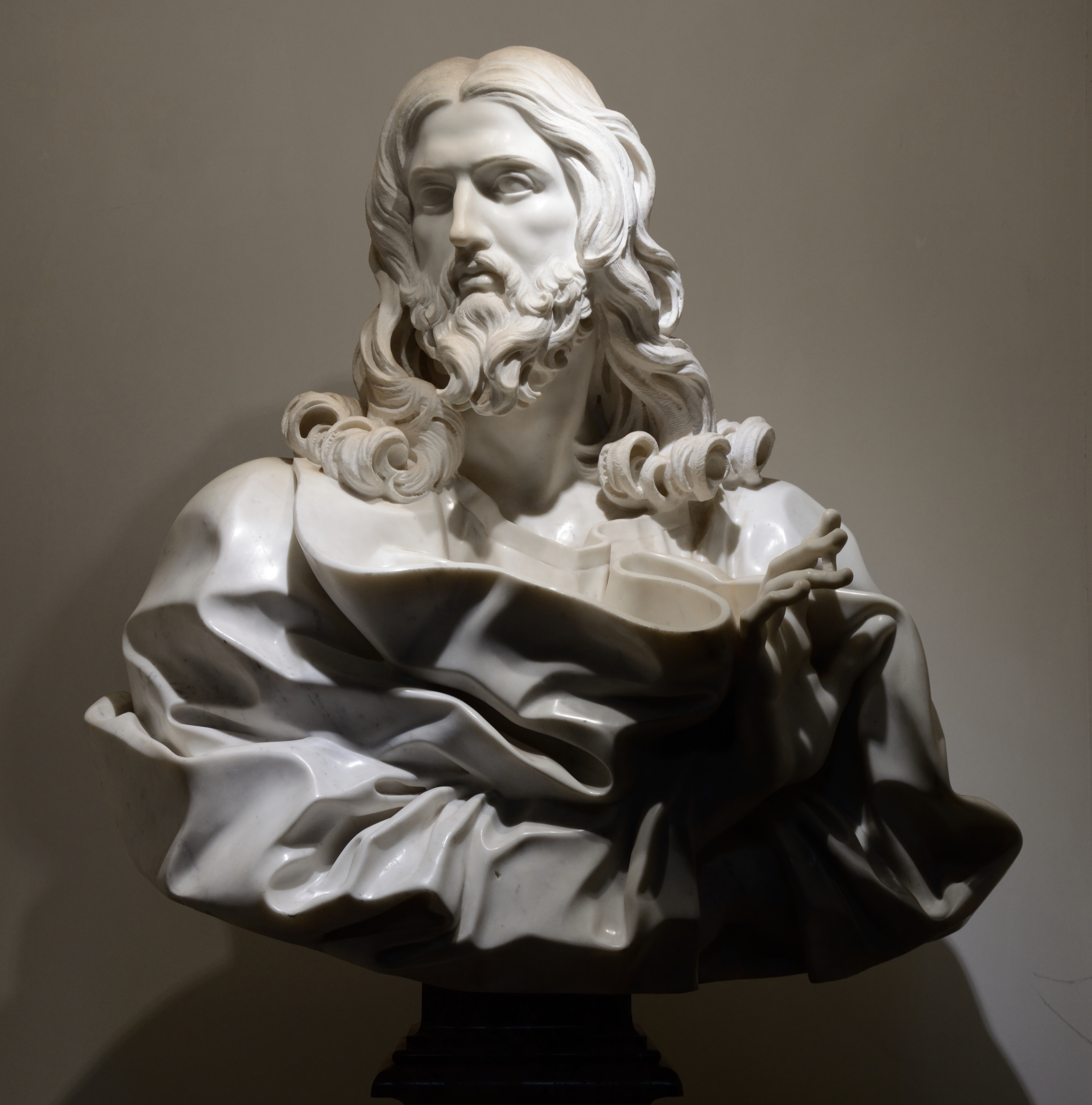
Bust of Jesus Christ by Gianlorenzo Bernini

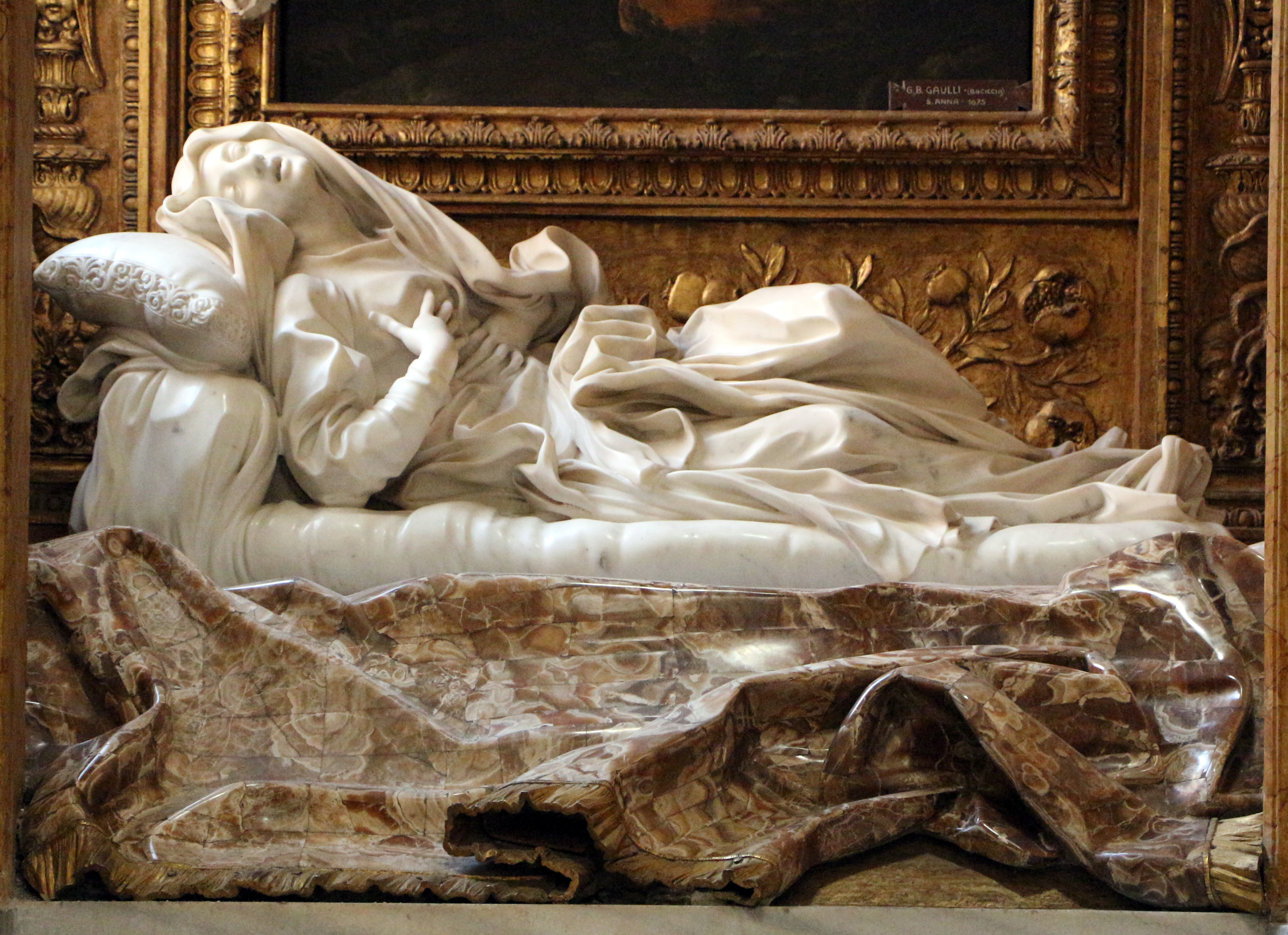
Blessed Ludovica Albertoni, 1671–1675

- The Goat Amalthea with the Infant Jupiter and a Faun (c. 1609–1615), marble, height 44 cm (17 in), Galleria Borghese, Rome
- Bust of Giovanni Battista Santoni (c. 1613–1616), marble, life-size, Santa Prassede, Rome
- A Faun Teased by Children (1616–17), marble, height 132 cm (52 in), Metropolitan Museum of Art, New York
- The Martyrdom of Saint Lawrence (1617), marble, 66 cm × 108 cm (26 in × 42.5 in), Uffizi, Florence
- Saint Sebastian (1617–18), marble, life-size, Thyssen-Bornemisza Museum, Madrid
- Bust of Giovanni Vigevano (1617–18), marble tomb, life-size, Santa Maria sopra Minerva, Rome
- Bust of Pope Paul V (1618), marble, 35 cm (14 in), Galleria Borghese, Rome
- Aeneas, Anchises, and Ascanius (1618–19), marble, height 220 cm (87 in), Galleria Borghese, Rome
- Damned Soul (1619), marble, life-size, Palazzo di Spagna, Rome
- Blessed Soul (1619), marble, life-size, Palazzo di Spagna, Rome
- Neptune and Triton (1620), marble, height 182 cm (72 in), Victoria and Albert Museum, London
- The Rape of Proserpina (1621–22), marble, height 225 cm (89 in), Galleria Borghese, Rome
- Bust of Pope Gregory XV (1621), marble, height 64 cm (25 in), Art Gallery of Ontario, Toronto
- Bust of Monsignor Pedro de Foix Montoya (c. 1621), marble, life-size, Santa Maria di Monserrato, Rome
- Bust of Cardinal Escoubleau de Sourdis (1622), marble, life-size, Musée d'Aquitaine, Bordeaux
- Apollo and Daphne (1622–1625), marble, height 243 cm (96 in), Galleria Borghese, Rome
- Bust of Antonio Cepparelli (1622), marble, Museo di San Giovanni dei Fiorentini, Rome
- David (1623–24), marble, height 170 cm (67 in), Galleria Borghese, Rome
- Saint Bibiana (1624–1626), marble, life-size, Santa Bibiana, Rome
- St. Peter's Baldachin (1623–1634) Bronze, partly gilt, 20 m (66 ft), St. Peter's Basilica, Vatican City
- Bust of Francesco Barberini (1626), marble, height 80 cm (31 in), National Gallery of Art, Washington, D.C.
- Charity with Four Children (1627–28) Terracotta, height 39 cm (15 in), Vatican Museums, Vatican City
- Tomb of Pope Urban VIII (1627–1647) Bronze and marble, larger than life-size, St. Peter's Basilica, Vatican City
- Saint Longinus (1631–1638), marble, height 440 cm (170 in), St. Peter's Basilica, Vatican City
- Two Busts of Scipione Borghese (1632), marble, height 78 cm (31 in), Galleria Borghese, Rome
- Bust of Costanza Bonarelli (1635), marble, height 72 cm (28 in), Bargello, Florence
- Bust of Thomas Baker (1638), marble, height 82 cm (32 in), Victoria and Albert Museum, London
- Bust of Cardinal Richelieu (1640–41), marble, life-size, Louvre, Paris
- Truth Unveiled by Time (1645–1652), marble, height 280 cm (110 in), Galleria Borghese, Rome
- Memorial to Maria Raggi (1647–1653) Gilt bronze and coloured marble, life-size, Santa Maria sopra Minerva, Rome
- Ecstasy of Saint Teresa (1647–1652), marble, life-size, Cappella Cornaro, Santa Maria della Vittoria, Rome
- Loggia of the Founders (1647–1652), marble, life-size, Cappella Cornaro, Santa Maria della Vittoria, Rome
- Corpus (1650) Bronze, life-size, Art Gallery of Ontario, Toronto
- Bust of Francesco I d'Este (1650–51), marble, height 107 cm, Galleria Estense, Modena
- The Vision of Constantine (1654–1670), marble, Vatican Museums, Apostolic Palace, Vatican City
- Daniel and the Lion (1655) Terracotta, height 41.6 cm, Vatican Museums, Vatican City
- Daniel and the Lion (1655–56), marble, Santa Maria del Popolo, Rome
- Habakkuk and the Angel (1655) Terracotta, height 52 cm, Vatican Museums, Vatican City
- Habakkuk and the Angel (1656–1661), marble, Santa Maria del Popolo, Rome
- Altar Cross (1657–1661) Gilt bronze corpus on bronze cross, height 45 cm (18 in), St. Peter's Basilica, Vatican City
- Chair of Saint Peter (1657–1666), marble, bronze, white and golden stucco, St. Peter's Basilica, Vatican City
- Statue of Saint Augustine (1657–1666) Bronze, St. Peter's Basilica, Vatican City
- Saints Jerome and Mary Magdalen (1661–1663), marble, height 180 cm, Cappella Chigi, Siena Cathedral, Siena
- Constantine, Scala Regia (1663–1670), marble with painted stucco drapery, Scala Regia, Apostolic Palace, Vatican City
- Bust of Louis XIV (1665) White marble, height 105 cm, Salon de Diane, Palace of Versailles, Versailles
- Elephant and Obelisk (erected 1667), marble, Piazza della Minerva, Rome
- Standing Angel with Scroll (1667–68) Clay, terracotta, height: 29.2 cm, Fogg Museum, Cambridge
- List of angels of Ponte Sant'Angelo (1667–1669), marble, Ponte Sant'Angelo, Rome
- Angel with the Crown of Thorns (1667–1669), marble, over life-size, Sant'Andrea delle Fratte, Rome
- Angel with the Superscription (1667–1669), marble, over life-size, Sant'Andrea delle Fratte, Rome
- Bust of Gabriele Fonseca (1668–1675), marble, over life-size, San Lorenzo in Lucina, Rome
- Equestrian Statue of King Louis XIV (1669–1684), marble, height 76 cm, Palace of Versailles, Versailles
- Blessed Ludovica Albertoni (1671–1674), marble, Cappella Altieri-Albertoni, San Francesco a Ripa, Rome
- Tomb of Pope Alexander VII (1671–1678), marble and gilded bronze, over life-size, St. Peter's Basilica, Vatican City

=== Architecture and fountains ===
- St. Peter's Square (1656–1667), marble, granite, travertine, stone, Vatican City
- Sant'Andrea al Quirinale, Via XX Settembre
- Fontana della Barcaccia (1627), marble, Piazza di Spagna, Rome
- Fontana del Tritone (1624–1643) Travertine, over life-size, Piazza Barberini, Rome
- Fontana delle Api (1644) Travertine, Piazza Barberini, Rome
- Fontana dei Quattro Fiumi (1648–1651) Travertine and marble, Piazza Navona, Rome
- Fontana del Moro (1653–54), marble, Piazza Navona, Rome

=== Paintings ===
- Self-Portrait as a Young Man (c. 1623) Oil on canvas, Galleria Borghese, Rome
- Portrait of Pope Urban VIII (c. 1625) Oil on canvas, Galleria Nazionale d'Arte Antica, Rome
- Saint Andrew and Saint Thomas (c. 1627) Oil on canvas, 59 x 76 cm, National Gallery, London
- Self-Portrait as a Mature Man (1630–35) Oil on canvas, Galleria Borghese, Rome
- Self-Portrait as a Mature Man (1635–1638) Oil on canvas, Museo del Prado, Madrid
- Portrait of a Boy (c. 1638) Oil on canvas, Galleria Borghese, Rome
- Christ Mocked (c. 1644–55) Oil on canvas, Private Collection, London
