= Bust of Giovanni Battista Santoni =

Sculpture by Gian Lorenzo Bernini

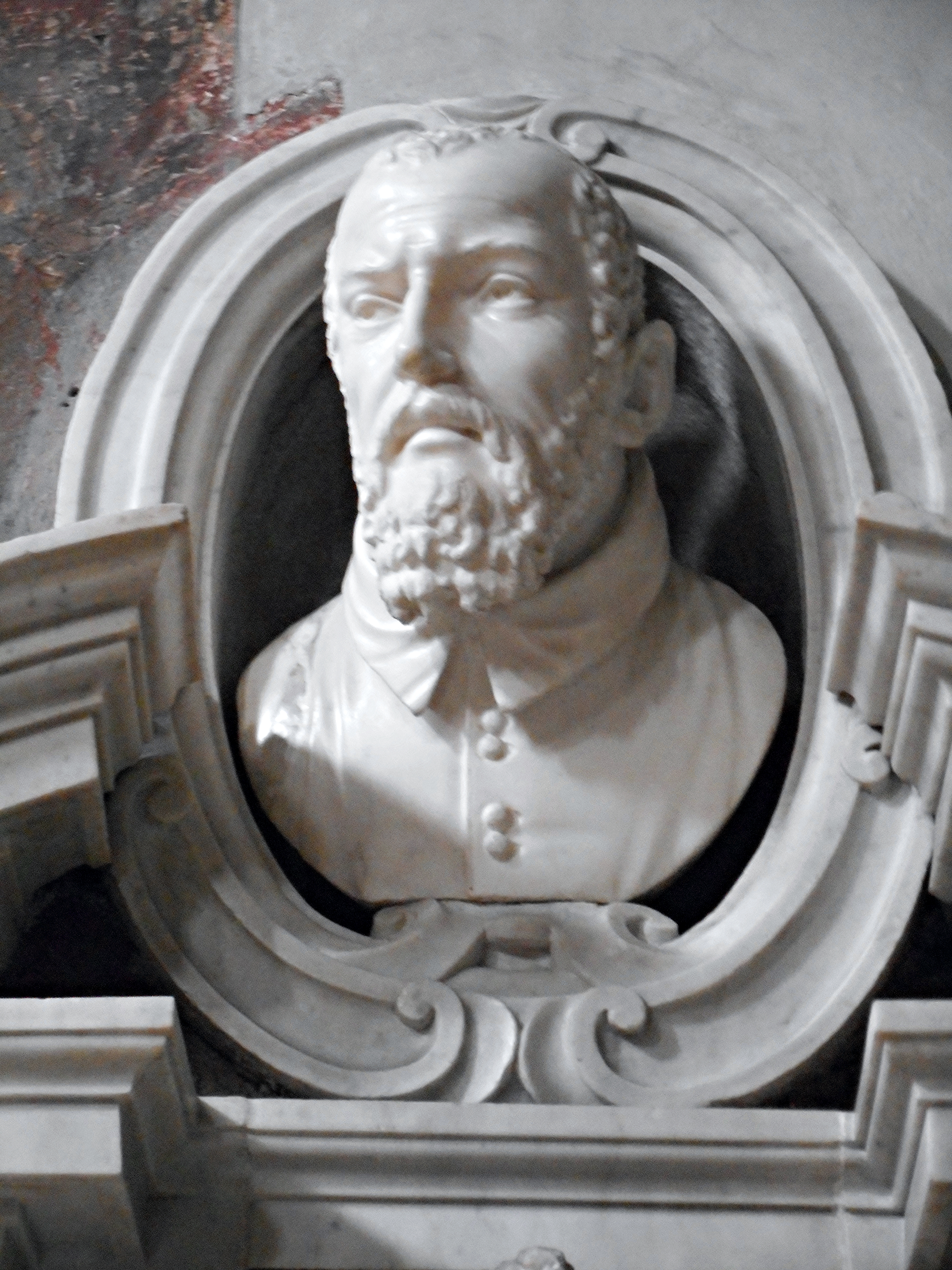
- Artist: Gian Lorenzo Bernini
- Year: 1613–1616
- Catalogue: 2
- Type: Sculpture
- Medium: Marble
- Subject: Giovanni Battista Santoni
- Dimensions: Life-size
- Location: Santa Prassede; Rome; 41°53′46″N 12°29′55″E
- Preceded by: The Goat Amalthea with the Infant Jupiter and a Faun
- Followed by: A Faun Teased by Children

The Bust of Giovanni Battisti Santoni is a sculptural portrait by the Italian artist Gian Lorenzo Bernini. Believed to be one of the artist's earliest works, the bust forms part of a tomb for Santoni, who was majordomo to Pope Sixtus V from 1590 to 1592. The work was executed sometime between 1613 and 1616, although some have dated the work as early as 1609 (when Bernini was ten years old), including Filippo Baldinucci. The work remains in its original setting in the church of Santa Prassede in Rome.

== Background ==
In 1568, Santoni was consecrated Bishop of Alife. In 1586, he was appointed the Bishop of Tricarico. In 1590, immediately after ascending the papal throne, Pope Sixtus V appointed Santoni his majordomo. Two years later, Santoni passed away. When Santoni's nephew was appointed to the bishopric in 1610, he commissioned the posthumous portrait of his uncle.

== Description ==
The life-size marble bust is set in an oval frame with Mannerist mouldings behind and in between a broken pediment. The oval frame crowns an elaborate frame ornamented by three cherubim, also created by Bernini. These cherubim may have served as models for the artist's early mythological statues of putti.

== Gallery ==
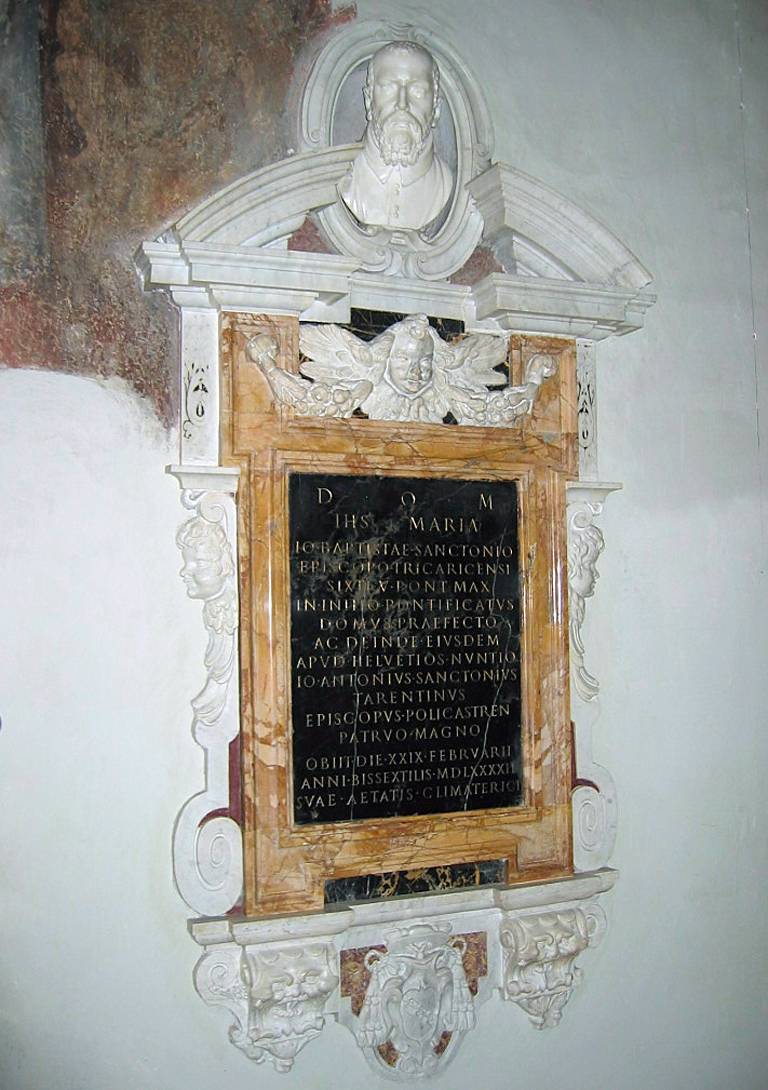
Tomb of Giovanni Battista Santoni

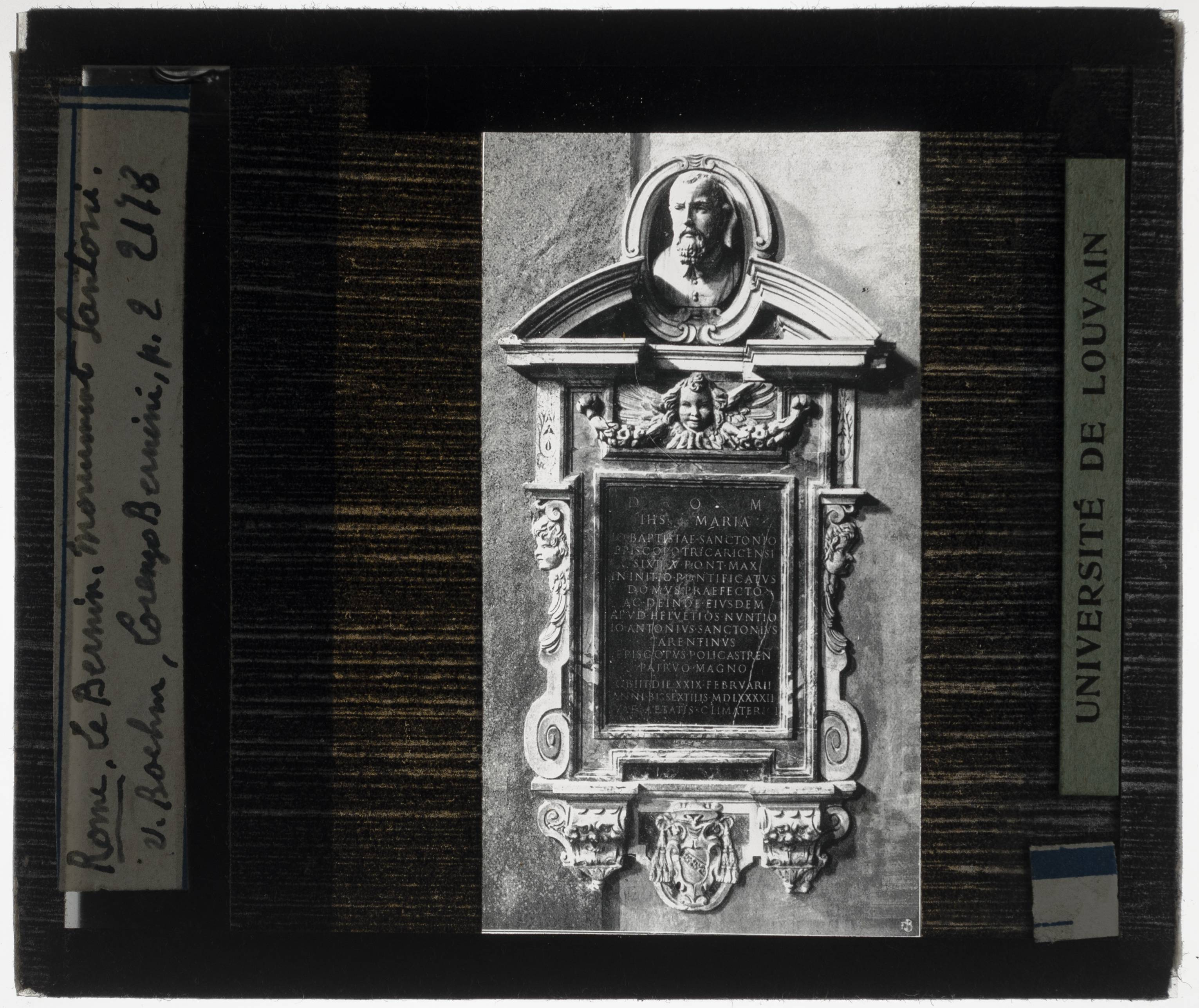
Monument to Giovanni Battista Santoni

== See also ==
- List of works by Gian Lorenzo Bernini
