= Confessio (Santa Francesca Romana) =

Confessio of Santa Francesca Romana

Confessio of Santa Francesca Romana
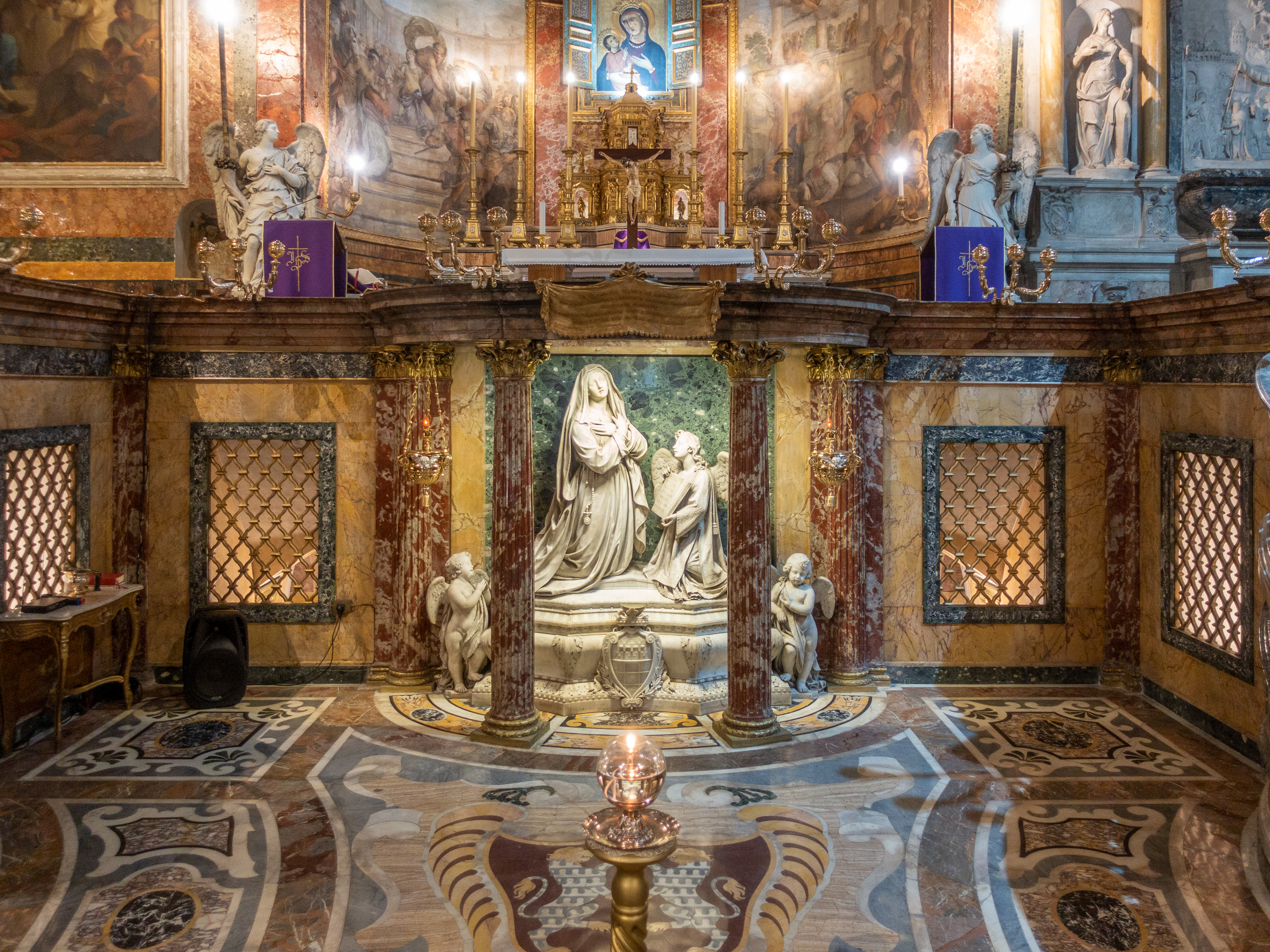
- Artist: Gian Lorenzo Bernini
- Year: 1638–1649
- Type: Sculpture
- Medium: Marble
- Subject: Frances of Rome
- Location: Santa Francesca Romana; Rome; 41°53′28.21″N 12°29′19.87″E
- Preceded by: Memorial to Maria Raggi
- Followed by: Raimondi Chapel

The confessio of Santa Francesca Romana is the confessio, the enclosed area below the altar, of the Basilica of Santa Francesca Romana in Rome.

It was built between 1638 and 1649 to a design by Gian Lorenzo Bernini, including a bronze sculptural group of St Frances and the angel. Bernini's sculpture was taken during the French occupation in 1798 and is now lost.

The current marble sculpture was created in 1866 by Giosuè Meli.

== Description ==
The confessio is flanked by two tiers of steps. The curvilinear marble balustrade is decorated with marble drums. In the center of the balustrade is a two-door bronze gate decorated with leaf volutes and polychrome enamel roundels.

Inside the confessio is the sculptural group depicting St Frances and the angel, behind four columns of Sicilian red jasper.

== St Frances and the angel ==
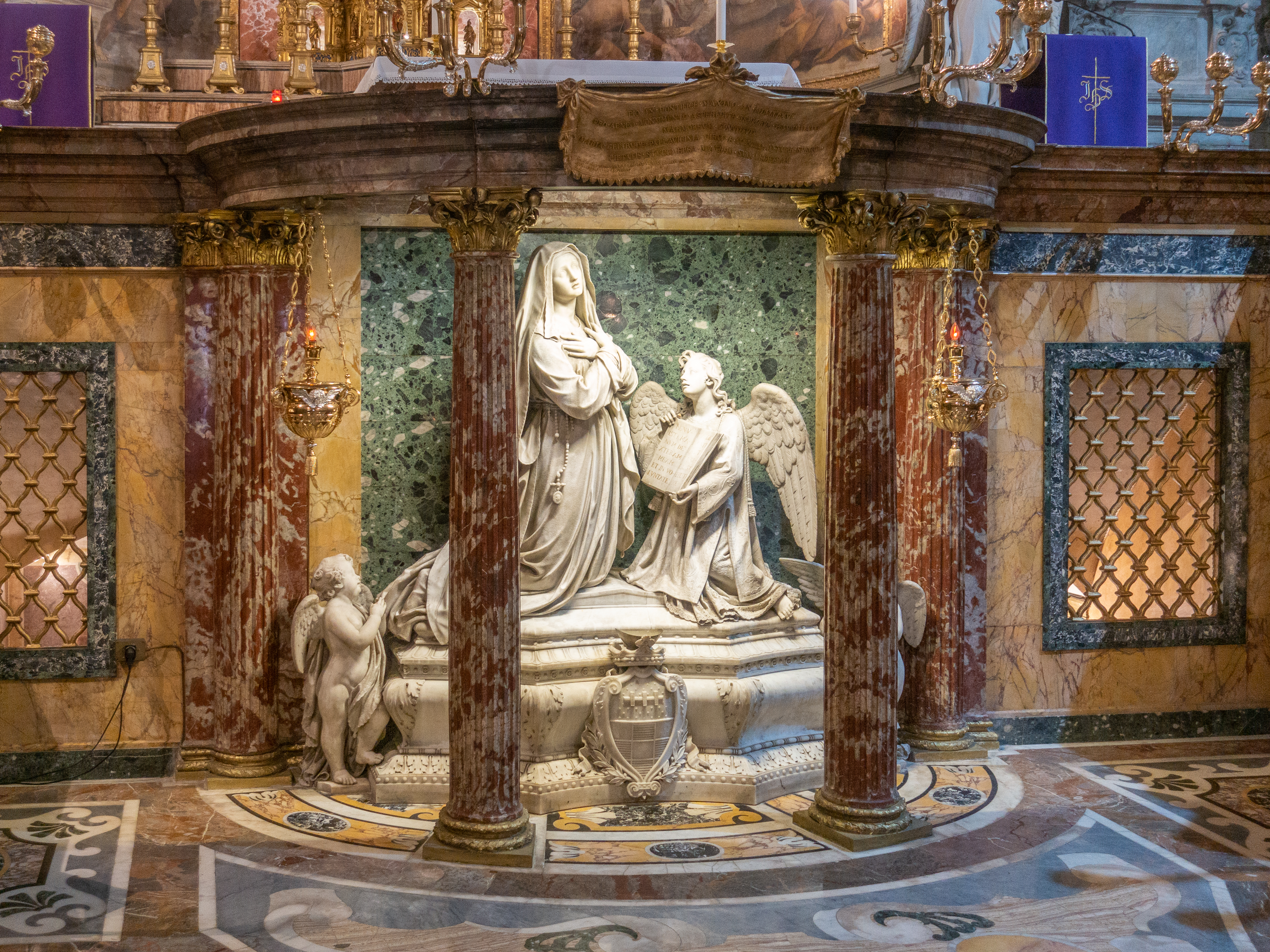

Bernini's sculptural group of St Frances and the angel was taken during the French occupation in 1798 and is now lost.

The current marble sculpture was created in 1866 by the Bergamo sculptor Giosuè Meli in the Neoclassical style. Meli sculpted extensive detail on the angel's robes.

== History ==
The confessio was built between 1638 and 1649 to a design by Gian Lorenzo Bernini.

During the French occupation in 1798, Bernini's sculptural group of St Frances and the angel was taken and is now lost.

In 1866, the confessio was restored by the Oblate Maria Gertrude Pallavicini. Giosuè Meli created a marble sculpture to replace the lost Bernini one.

== Gallery ==
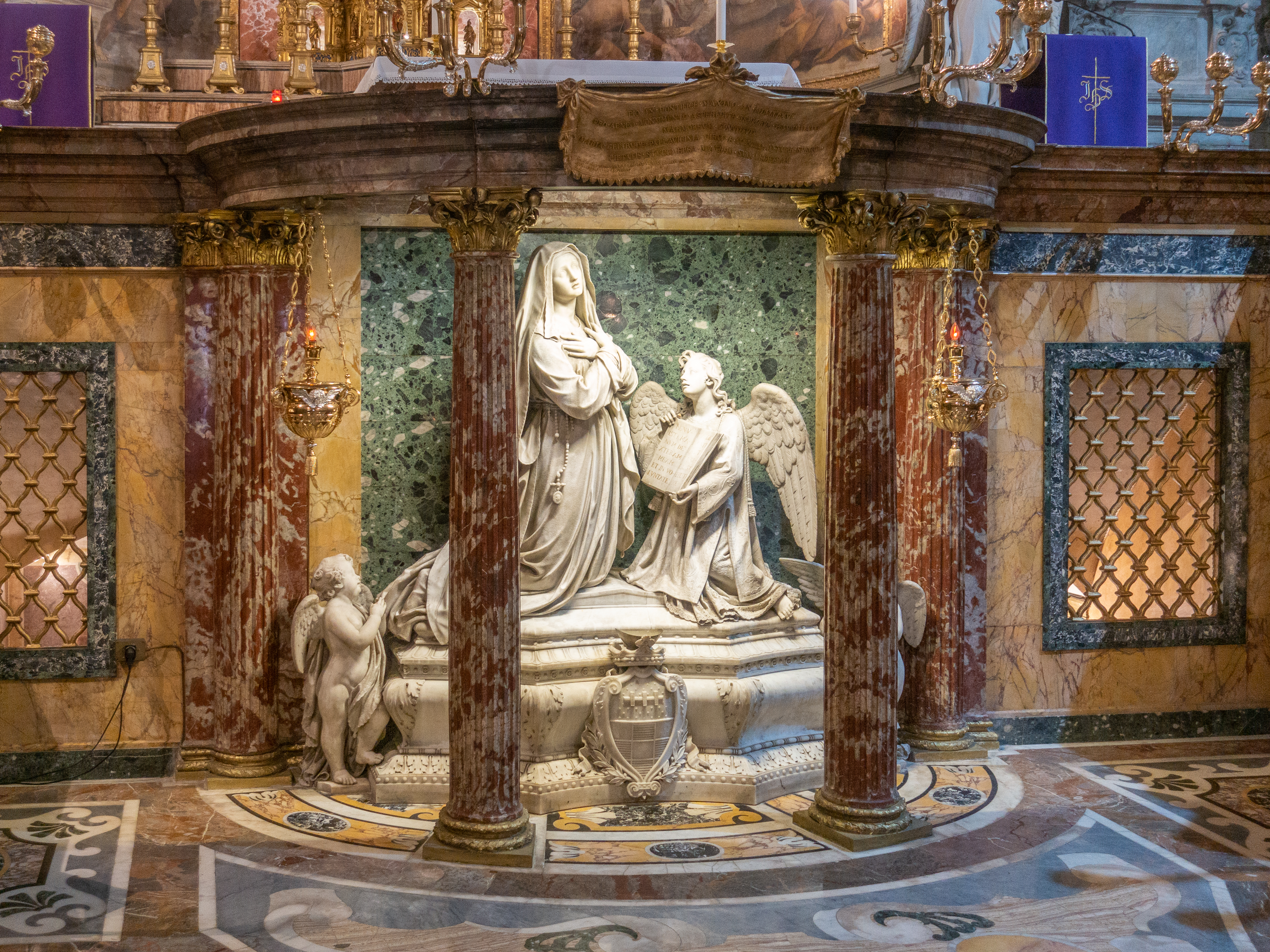

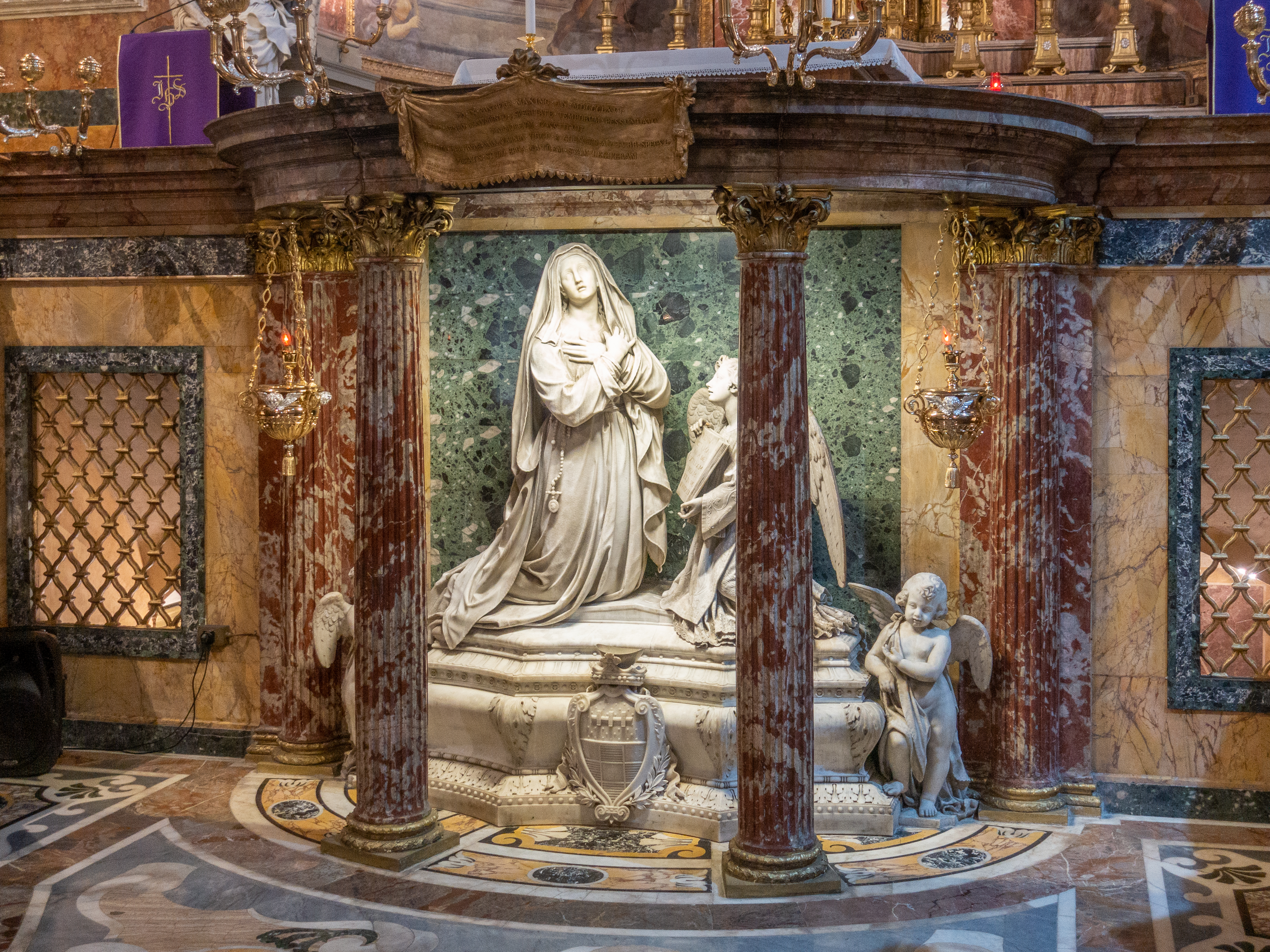

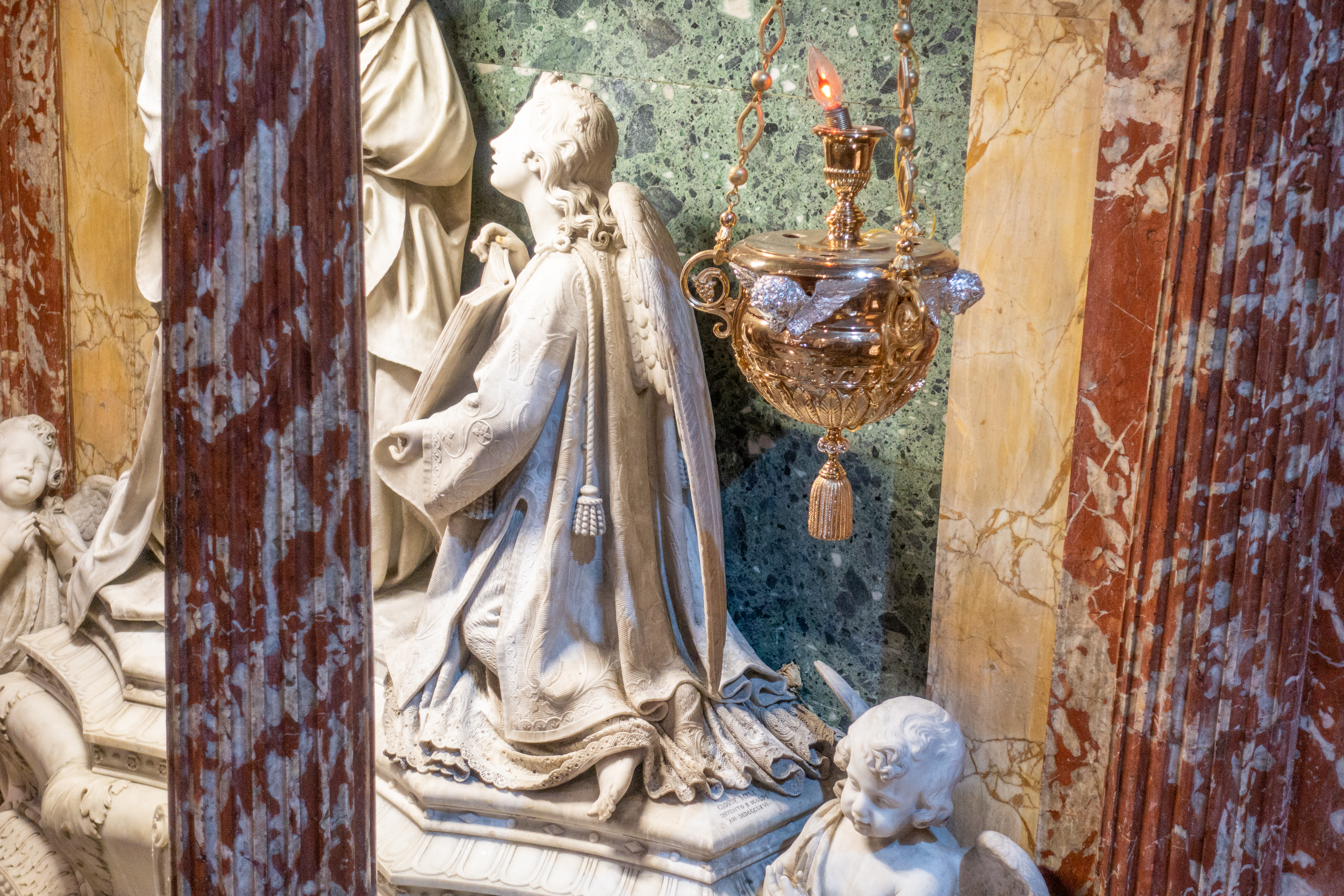

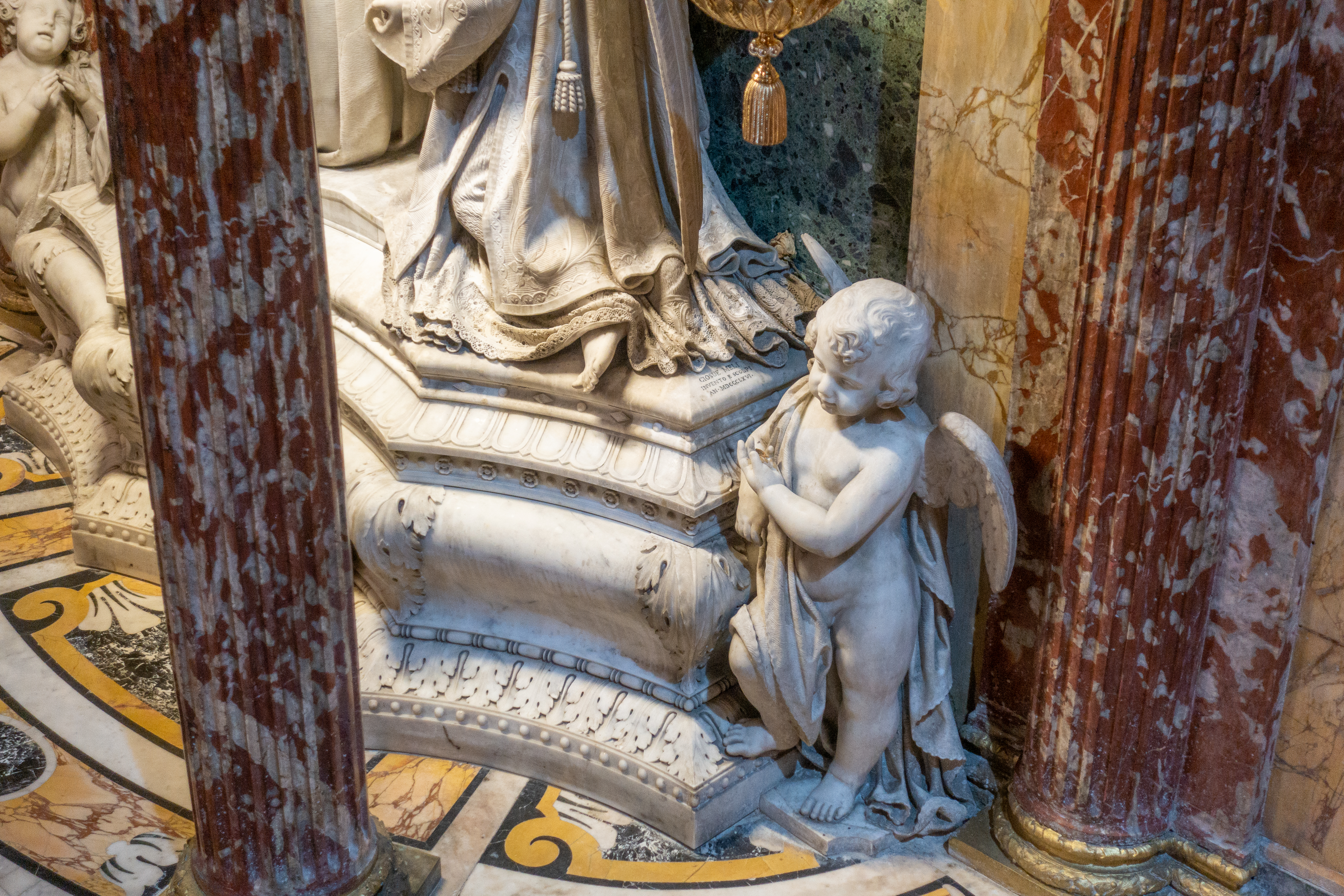

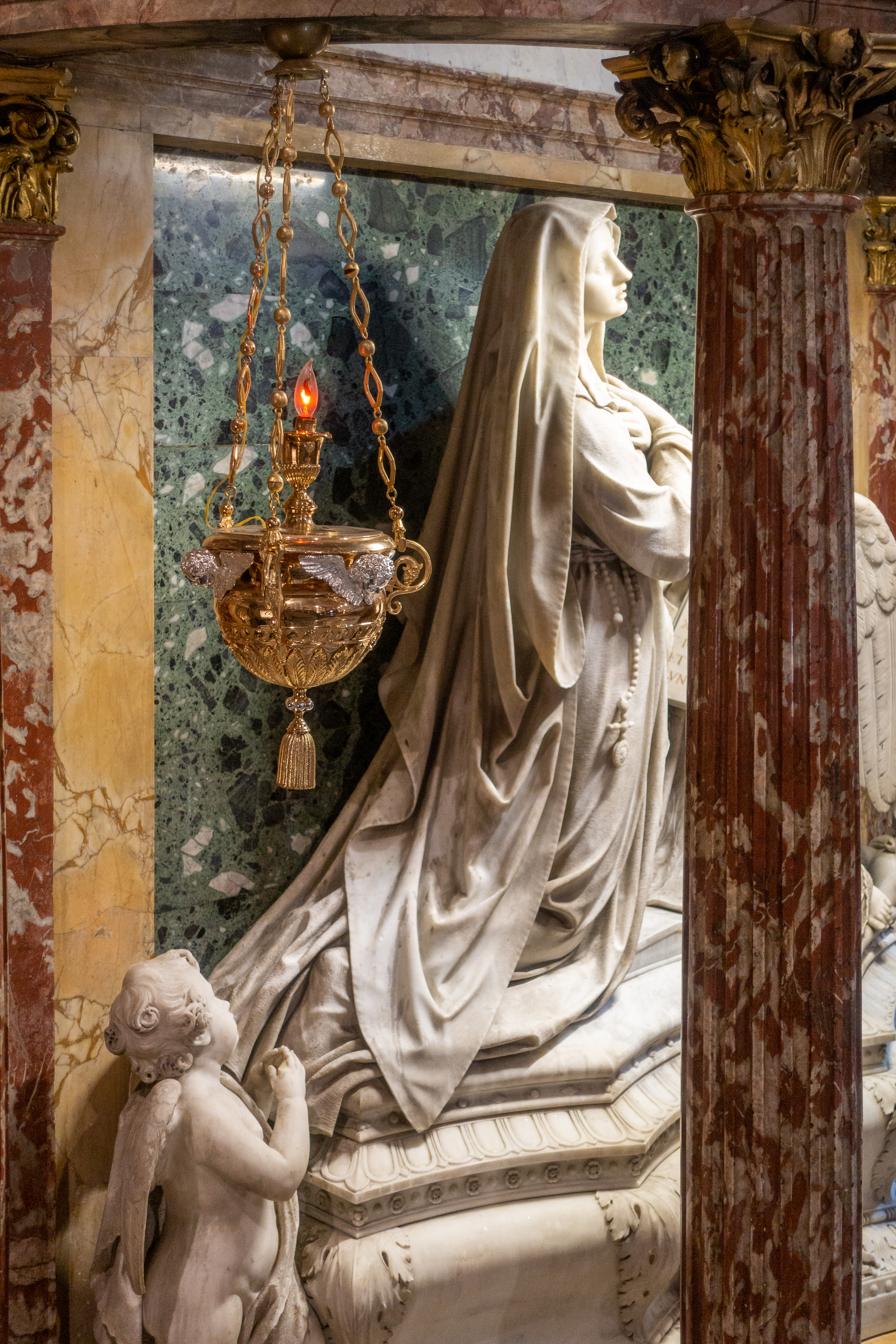

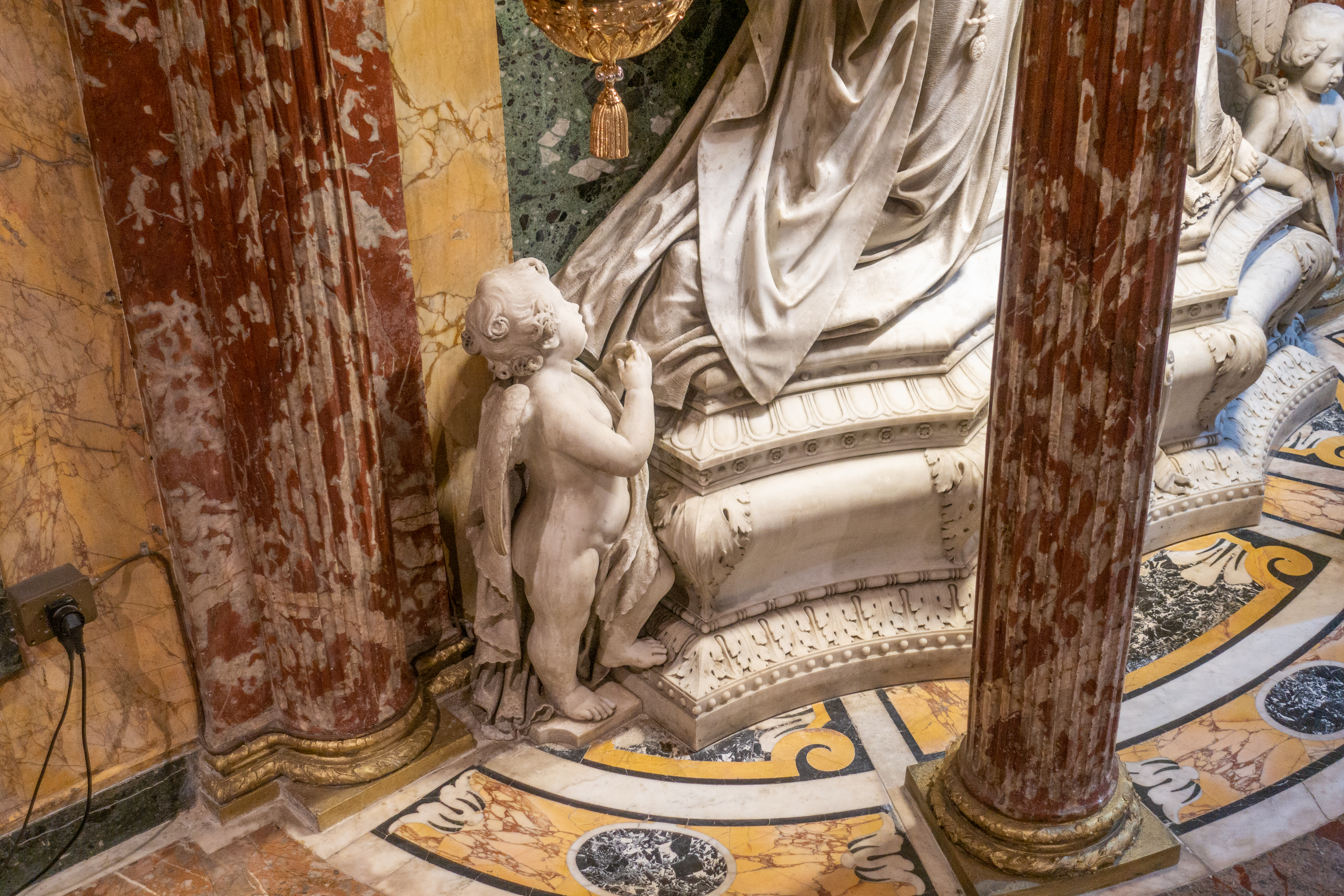

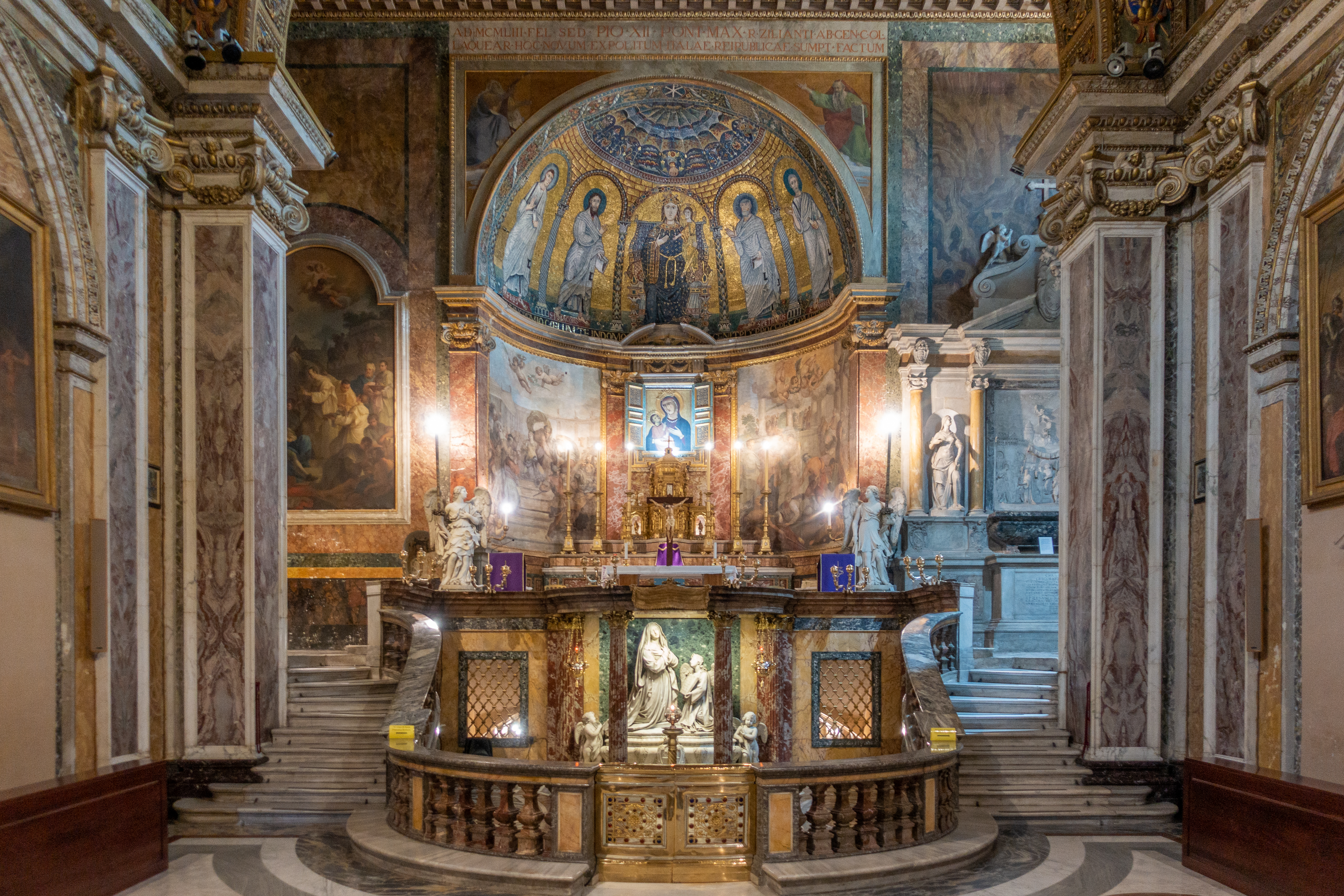

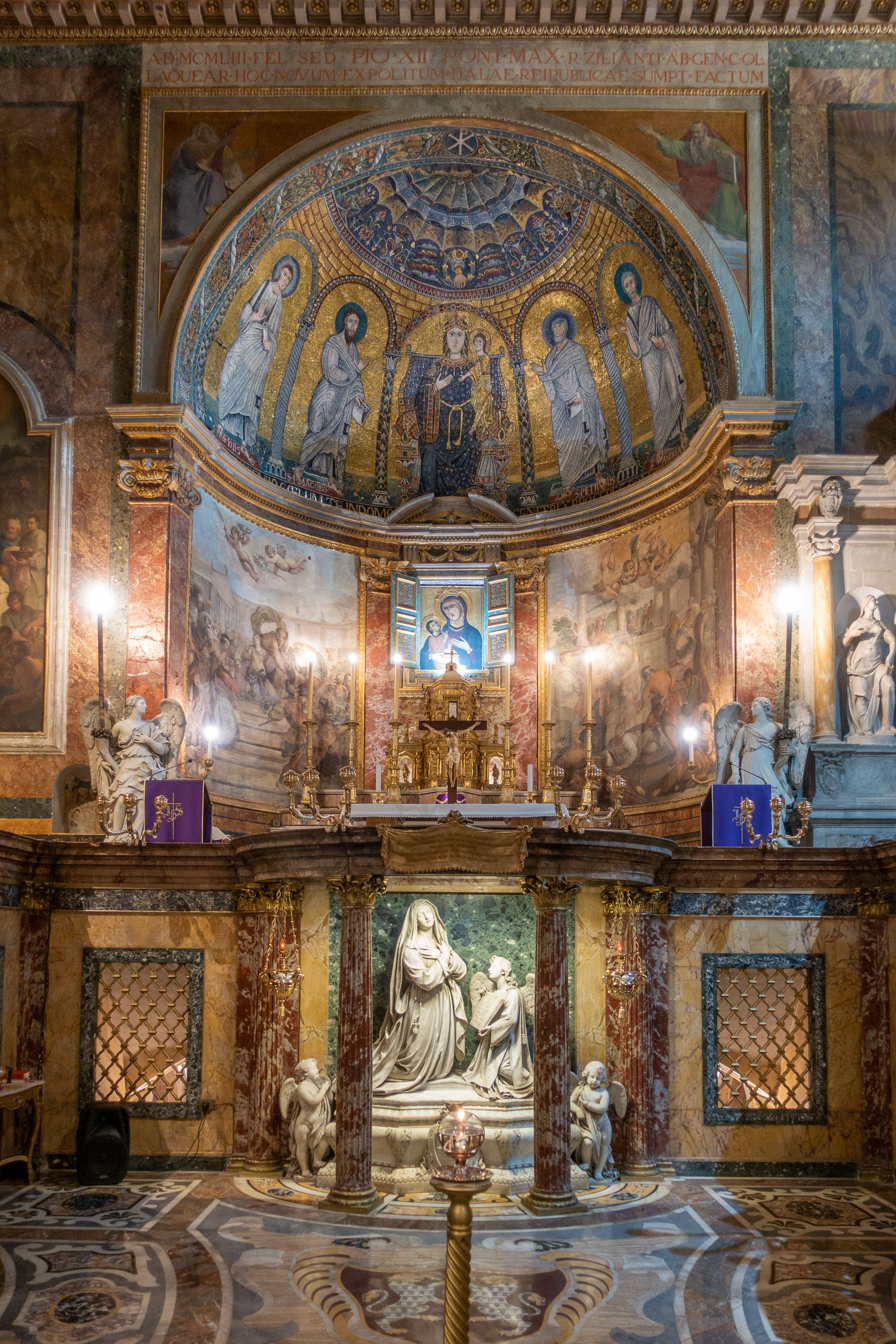

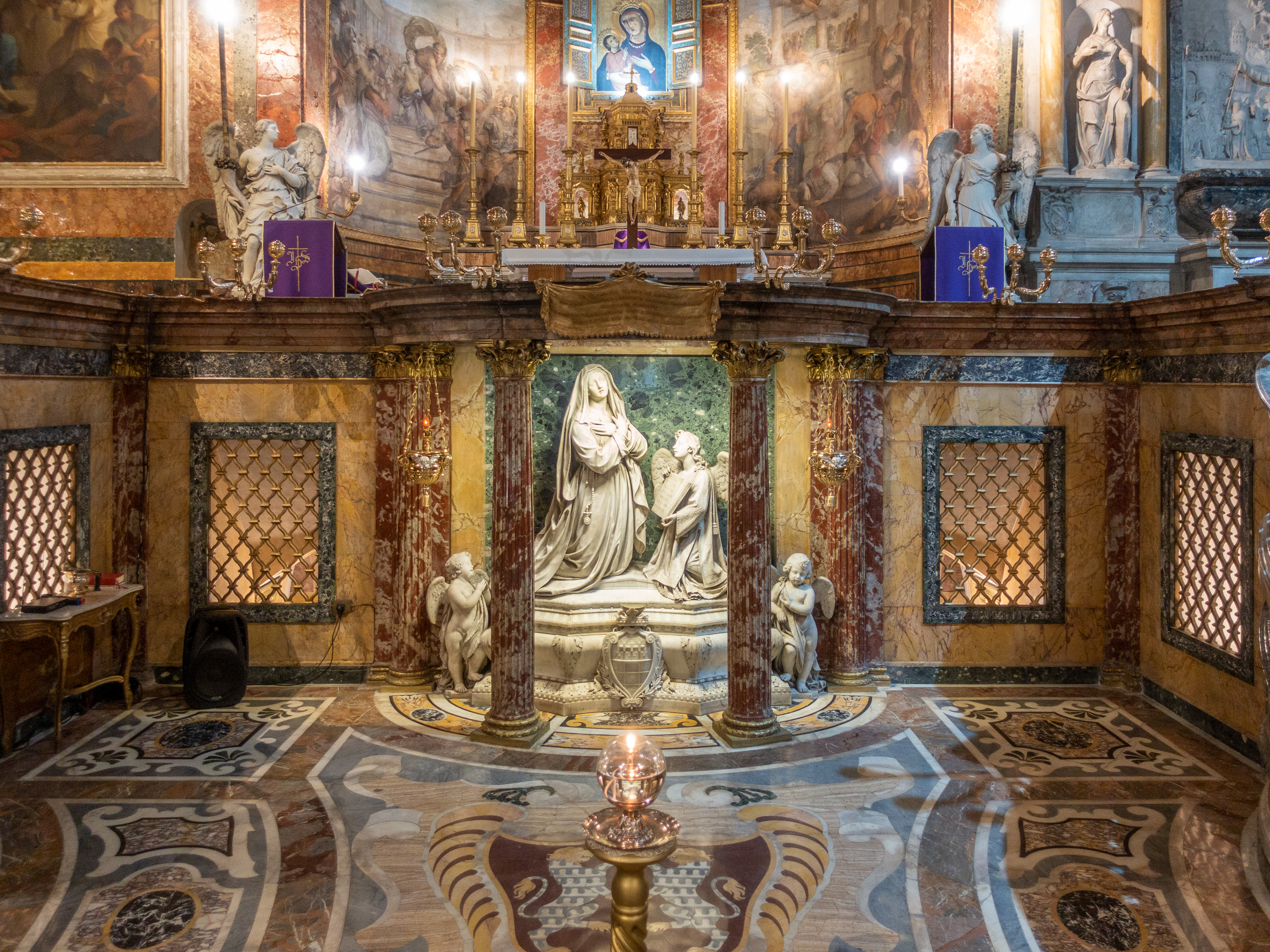

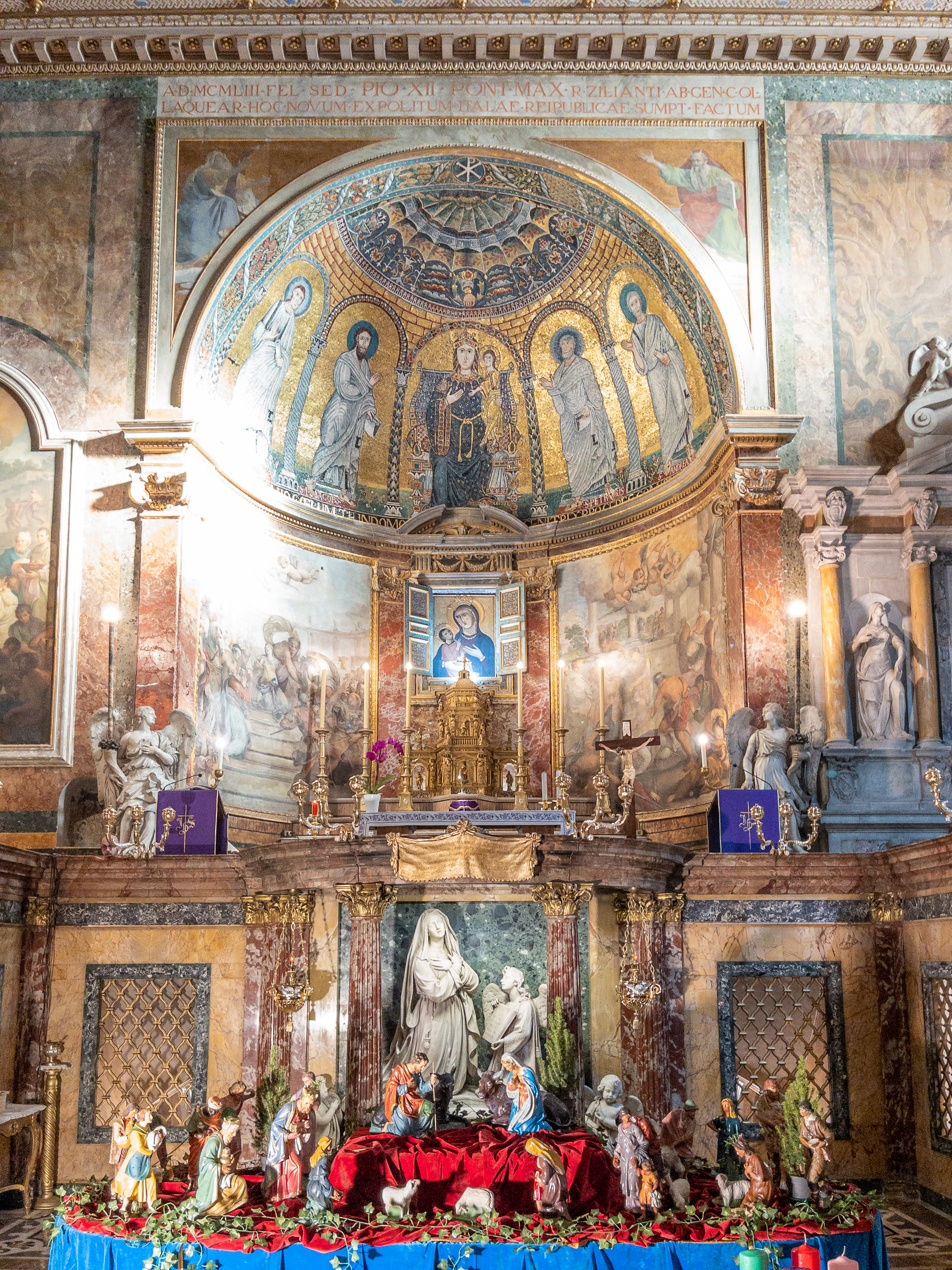

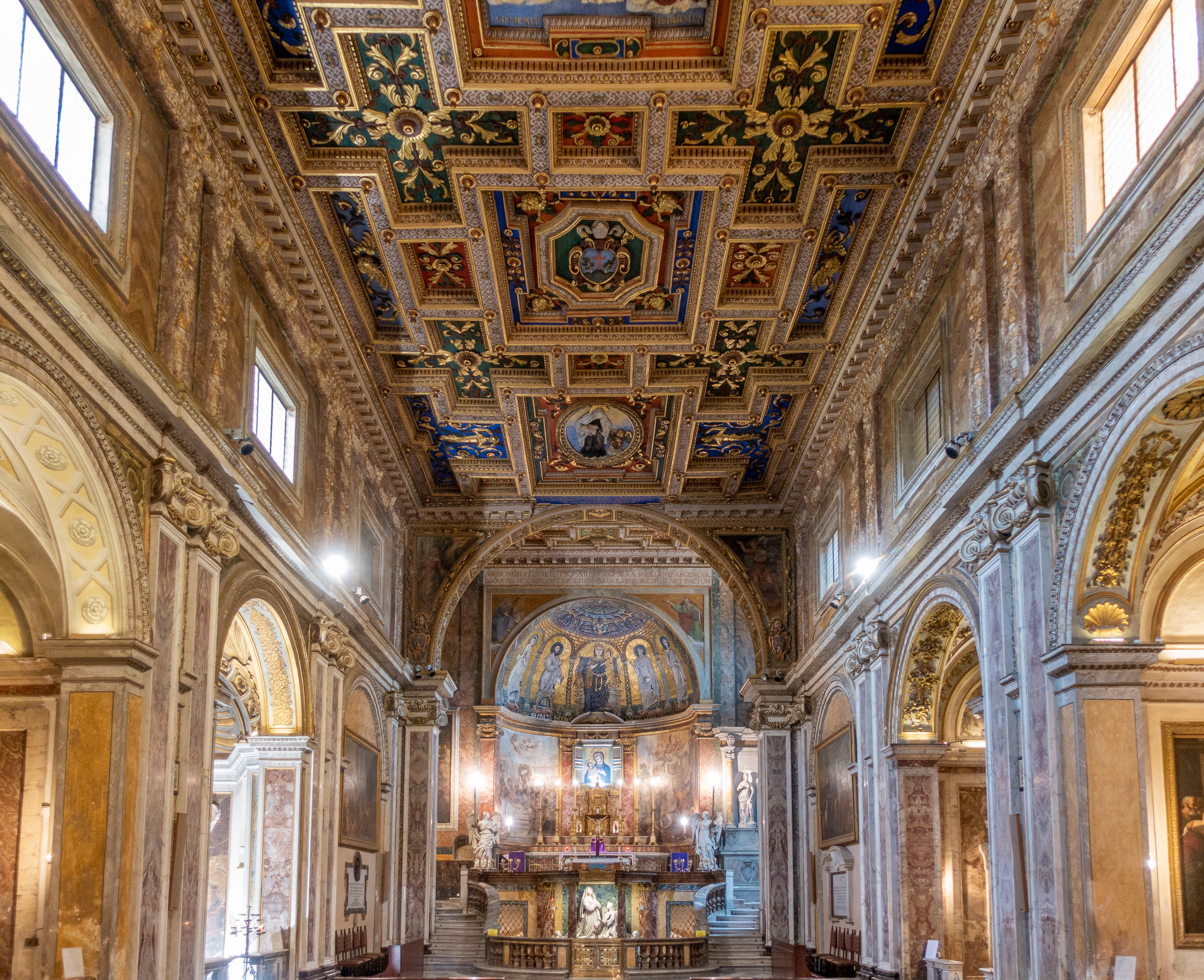

== See also ==
- List of works by Gian Lorenzo Bernini
