= Bust of Pope Paul V =

Busts by Gian Lorenzo Bernini

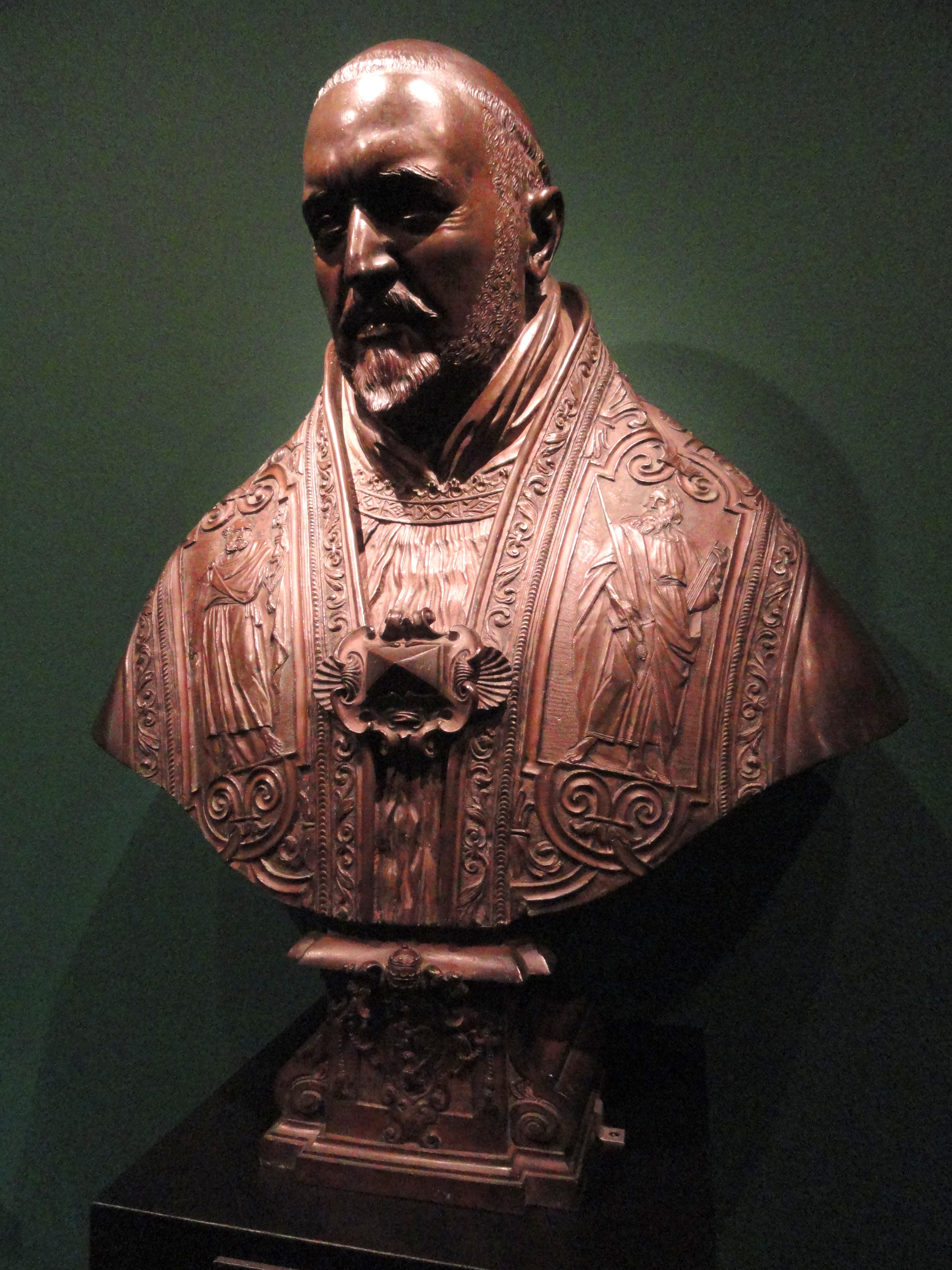
- Bronze version of the bust, Copenhagen
- Artist: Gian Lorenzo Bernini
- Year: 1621
- Catalogue: 6 (2)
- Type: Sculpture
- Medium: Carrara marble
- Dimensions: 79 cm (31 in)
- Location: National Gallery of Denmark, Copenhagen
- Owner: National Gallery of Denmark
- Preceded by: Bust of Giovanni Vigevano
- Followed by: Damned Soul (Bernini)

The Italian artist Gian Lorenzo Bernini made two Busts of Pope Paul V. The first is currently in the Galleria Borghese in Rome. 1618 is the commonly accepted date for the portrait of the pope. In 2015, a second bust was acquired by the J. Paul Getty Museum in Los Angeles. It was created by Bernini 1621, shortly after the death of Paul V, and commissioned by his nephew, Cardinal Scipione Borghese. A bronze version of this sculpture exists in the Statens Museum for Kunst, Copenhagen, Denmark.

== Rediscovery of second bust ==
For most of the twentieth century, the second bust had been presumed lost. It was sold by the Borghese family in 1893, and an art historian recorded its existence in Vienna in 1916. However, little more was known about the presence of the bust until it appeared in auction in Slovakia in 2014; the piece had been in the private collection of the Slovakian artist Ernest Zmeták. Unrecognised by the sellers, it was bought by a resident of Bratislava, Clément Guenebeaud, who then sold the bust via Sotheby's to the current holders, the Getty Museum.

== See also ==
- List of works by Gian Lorenzo Bernini
