= List of works by Gian Lorenzo Bernini =

The following is a list of works of sculpture, architecture, and painting by the Italian Baroque artist Gian Lorenzo Bernini. The numbering follows Rudolph Wittkower's Catalogue, published in 1966 in Gian Lorenzo Bernini: The Sculptor of the Roman Baroque.

== Works ==
Image	Title	Location	Year Type Material	No. Ref
	The Goat Amalthea with the Infant Jupiter and a Faun	Galleria Borghese, Rome	1609–1615; Sculpture; Marble; Height 44 cm (17.3 in)	1
	Bust of Giovanni Battista Santoni	Santa Prassede, Rome	1613–1616; Sculpture; Marble; Life-size	2
	A Faun Teased by Children	Metropolitan Museum of Art, New York	1616–1617; Sculpture; Marble; Height 132 cm (52 in)	NA
	The Martyrdom of Saint Lawrence	Uffizi, Florence	1617; Sculpture; Marble; 66 cm × 108 cm (26 in × 43 in)	3
	Saint Sebastian	Thyssen-Bornemisza Museum, Madrid	1617–1618; Sculpture; Marble; Under life-size	4
	Bust of Giovanni Vigevano	Santa Maria sopra Minerva, Rome	1617–1618; Sculpture; Marble; Life-size	5
	Bust of Pope Paul V	Galleria Borghese, Rome	1618; Sculpture; Marble; Height 35 cm (14 in)	6
	Damned Soul	Palace of Spain, Rome	1619; Sculpture; Marble; Life-size	7
	Blessed Soul	Palace of Spain, Rome	1619; Sculpture; Marble; Life-size	7
	Aeneas, Anchises, and Ascanius	Galleria Borghese, Rome	1618–1619; Sculpture; Marble; Life-size	8
	Neptune and Triton	Victoria and Albert Museum, London	1620; Sculpture; Marble; Height 182 cm (72 in)	9
	The Rape of Proserpina	Galleria Borghese, Rome	1621–1622; Sculpture; Marble; Height 225 cm (89 in)	10
	Sleeping Hermaphroditus	The Louvre, Paris	1620; Sculpture; Marble; Length 169 cm (67 in)	11(1)
	Barberini Faun	Glyptothek, Munich	1621–1622; Sculpture; Marble; Restoration	11(2)
	Ludovisi Ares	National Museum of Rome, Rome	1622; Sculpture; Marble; Restoration	11(3)
	Bust of Pope Gregory XV	Art Gallery of Ontario, Toronto	1621; Sculpture; Marble; Height 64 cm (25 in)	12
	Bust of Monsignor Pedro de Foix Montoya	Santa Maria di Monserrato, Rome	1621; Sculpture; Marble; Life-size	13
	Bust of Cardinal Escoubleau de Sourdis	Musée d'Aquitaine, Bordeaux	1622; Sculpture; Marble; Life-size	14
	Bust of Cardinal Roberto Bellarmine	Church of the Gesù, Rome	1622; Sculpture; Marble; Life-size	15
Image, online	Bust of Cardinal Giovanni Dolfin	Isola di San Michele, Venice	1622; Sculpture; Marble	16
	Bust of Alessandro Peretti di Montalto	Kunsthalle, Hamburg	1622; Sculpture; Marble; Height 88 cm (34.6 in)	81(7)
	Bust of Carlo Antonio del Pozzo	National Galleries of Scotland, Edinburgh	1622; Sculpture; Marble; Height 82 cm (32 in)	81(8)
	Self-Portrait as a Young Man (Bernini)	Galleria Borghese, Rome	1623; Painting; Oil on canvas 38 cm × 30 cm (15 in × 11.8 in)	NA
	David	Galleria Borghese, Rome	1623–1624; Sculpture; Marble; Height 170 cm (67 in)	17
	Apollo and Daphne	Galleria Borghese, Rome	1622–1625; Sculpture; Marble; Height 243 cm (96 in)	18
	Bust of Antonio Cepparelli	San Giovanni dei Fiorentini, Rome	1622; Sculpture; Marble; Height 70 cm (27.5 in)	NA
	Busts of Pope Urban VIII	National Gallery of Canada, Ottawa	1632; Sculpture; Marble; Life-size	19
	Saint Bibiana	Santa Bibiana, Rome	1624–1626; Sculpture; Marble; Life-size	20
	St. Peter's Baldachin	St. Peter's Basilica, Vatican City	1623–1634; Sculpture; Bronze; Height 20 m (66 ft), columns	21
	Bust of Cardinal Melchior Klesl	Wiener Neustadt Cathedral, Wiener Neustadt	1623 c. Sculpture; Bronze	22
	Two Angels in Sant'Agostino	Basilica of Sant'Agostino, Rome	1626–1628; Sculpture; Marble; Life-size	23
	Bust of Francesco Barberini	National Gallery of Art, Washington, D.C.	1626; Sculpture; Marble; Height 80 cm (31 in)	24(a)
	Bust of Camilla Barbadoni	Statens Museum for Kunst, Copenhagen	1626; Sculpture; Marble; Height 60 cm (24 in)	24(c)
	Saint Andrew and Saint Thomas	National Gallery, London	1627; Painting; Oil on canvas Height: 59 cm (23.2 in)	NA
	Fontana della Barcaccia	Piazza di Spagna, Rome	1627; Fountain; Marble; Width circa 10 m (33 ft)	80(1)
	Busts of Cardinals Agostino and Pietro Valier	Oratory, Seminario, Venice	1629; Sculpture; Marble; Life-size	25
Image, online	Memorial to Carlo Barberini	Santa Maria in Ara Coeli, Rome	1630; Sculpture; Marble	26
	Statue of Carlo Barberini	Palazzo dei Conservatori, Rome	1630; Sculpture; Marble; Life-size	27
	Self-Portrait as a Mature Man (Bernini)	Uffizi, Florence	1630–1635; Painting; Oil on canvas 62 cm × 46 cm (24.4 in × 18.1 in)	NA
	Saint Longinus	St. Peter's Basilica, Vatican City	1631–1638; Sculpture; Marble; Height 440 cm (174 in)	28
	Balconies in the Pillars of the Dome of St. Peter's Basilica	St. Peter's Basilica, Vatican City	1633–1640; Sculpture; Marble	29
	Tomb of Pope Urban VIII	St. Peter's Basilica, Vatican City	1627–1647; Sculpture; Golden bronze and marble	30
	Charity with Four Children	Vatican Museums, Apostolic Palace, Vatican Museums	1627–1628; Sculpture; Terracotta; Dimensions 39 cm (15 in)	30
	Portrait of Pope Urban VIII (Bernini)	Galleria Nazionale d'Arte Antica, Rome	1632; Painting; Oil on canvas Height: 67 cm (26.3 in)	NA
	Two Busts of Cardinal Scipione Borghese	Galleria Borghese, Rome	1632; Sculpture; Marble	31
	Renovation of the Lateran Baptistery	Lateran Baptistery, Rome	1633; Architecture	
	Fontana del Tritone	Piazza Barberini, Rome	1642–1643; Fountain; Travertine; Monumental	32
	Tomb of Countess Matilda of Tuscany	St. Peter's Basilica, Vatican City	1633–1637; Sculpture; Marble; Over life-size	33
Image, online	Pasce Oves Meas	St. Peter's Basilica, Vatican City	1639–1644; Sculpture; Marble	34
	Bust of Costanza Bonarelli	Museo Nazionale del Bargello, Florence	1636-1637; Sculpture; Marble; Height 72 cm (28 in)	35
Images, online	Busts of Paolo Giordano and Isabella Orsini	Castello Orsini-Odescalchi, Bracciano	1635; Sculpture; Marble	36
Image, online	Memorial Inscription for Pope Urban VIII	Santa Maria in Aracoeli, Rome	1636; Sculpture; Marble	37
	Statue of Pope Urban VIII	Palazzo dei Conservatori, Rome	1635–1640; Sculpture; Marble; Over life-size	38
Image, online	Bust of King Charles I (Bernini)	Palace of Whitehall, London	1635–1640; Sculpture; Marble	39
	Bust of Thomas Baker	Victoria and Albert Museum, London	1638; Sculpture; Marble; Height 82 cm (32 in)	40
	Medusa	Palazzo dei Conservatori, Rome	1636; Sculpture; Marble; Over life-size	41
	Portrait of a Boy	Galleria Borghese, Rome	1638; Painting; Oil on canvas	NA
	Bust of Cardinal Richelieu	The Louvre, Paris	1640–1641; Sculpture; Marble; Life-size	42
	Memorial to Alessandro Valtrini	San Lorenzo in Damaso, Rome	1639; Sculpture; Marble; Life-size skeleton	43
Image, online	Memorial to Ippolito Merenda	San Giacomo alla Lungara, Rome	1636–1638; Sculpture; Marble	43
	Fontana delle Api	Piazza Barberini, Rome	1644; Fountain; Travertine	80(3)
	Christ Mocked (Bernini)	Private Collection, London	1644–1655; Painting; Oil on canvas Height: 25.8 cm (10.2 in)	NA
	Memorial to Maria Raggi	Santa Maria sopra Minerva, Rome	1647–1653; Sculpture; Gilt bronze and coloured marble Life-size portrait	44
	Confessio of Santa Francesca Romana	Santa Francesca Romana, Rome	1638–1649; Sculpture; Marble	45
	Raimondi Chapel	San Pietro in Montorio, Rome	1638–1648; Sculpture; Gilt bronze relief	46
	Decoration of Chapels and Nave of St. Peter's Basilica	St. Peter's Basilica, Vatican City	1645–1648; Sculpture; Marble	47
	Ecstasy of Saint Teresa	Cornaro Chapel, Santa Maria della Vittoria, Rome	1647–1652; Sculpture; Marble; Life-size figures	48
	Cornaro-Kapelle (in German)	Cornaro Chapel, Santa Maria della Vittoria, Rome	1647–1652; Sculpture; Marble; Life-size figures	48
	Truth Unveiled by Time	Galleria Borghese, Rome	1645–1652; Sculpture; Marble; Height 280 cm (110 in)	49
	Fontana dei Quattro Fiumi	Piazza Navona, Rome	1648–1651; Fountain; Travertine and marble	50
	Busts of Pope Innocent X - First version	Doria Pamphilj Gallery, Rome	1650; Sculpture; Marble	51a
	Busts of Pope Innocent X - Second version	Doria Pamphilj Gallery, Rome	1650; Sculpture; Marble	51b
	Noli Me Tangere	Santi Domenico e Sisto, Rome	1650; Sculpture; Marble; Life-size figures	52
Image, online	Virgin and Child	Saint-Joseph-des-Carmes, Paris	1656–1663; Sculpture; Marble	53
	Bust of Francesco I d'Este	Galleria Estense, Modena	1650–1651; Sculpture; Marble; Height 100 cm (39 in)	54
	Fontana del Moro	Piazza Navona, Rome	1653–1654; Fountain; Marble	55
	Tomb of Cardinal Domenico Pimentel	Santa Maria sopra Minerva, Rome	1653; Sculpture; Marble; Over life-size figures	56
	Crucified Christ (Bernini)	Royal Collections Gallery, Madrid	1655; Sculpture; Bronze (233 x 166 cm)	57
	Corpus	Art Gallery of Ontario, Toronto	1650; Sculpture; Bronze; Life-size	57
	Dead Christ on the Cross	Walters Art Museum, Baltimore	1657–1661; Sculpture; Gilt bronze corpus on bronze cross Likely a later cast	57
	Decoration of Santa Maria del Popolo	Santa Maria del Popolo, Rome	1655; Sculpture; Stucco and marble	58
	Daniel and the Lion	Chigi Chapel, Santa Maria del Popolo, Rome	1655-1656; Sculpture; Marble	58
	Habakkuk and the Angel	Chigi Chapel, Santa Maria del Popolo, Rome	1656-1661; Sculpture; Marble; Over life-size	58
	Lamp with Crown and Cherubs by Peter Verpoorten	Chigi Chapel, Santa Maria del Popolo, Rome	1656-1657; Sculpture; Bronze	NA
	Putti Lifting a Large Drapery	Sala Ducale (in German), Vatican City	1656–1657; Sculpture; Stucco	59
	Santa Barbara (in Italian)	Cattedrale di Santa Maria Assunta, Rieti (in Italian)	1655–1657; Sculpture; Marble	60
	Chair of Saint Peter	St. Peter's Basilica, Vatican City	1657–1666; Sculpture; Marble, bronze, white and golden stucco	61
	Collegiata di San Tommaso da Villanova (in Italian)	Castel Gandolfo	1658–1661 Architecture, sculpture Marble	62(1)
	Santa Maria Assunta	Ariccia	1662–1664; Architecture, sculpture Marble	62 (2)
	Sant'Andrea al Quirinale	Sant'Andrea al Quirinale, Rome	1658–1670; Architecture, sculpture Marble	62(3)
	Saint Jerome	Chigi Chapel, Siena Cathedral, Siena	1659–1663; Sculpture; Marble; Over life-size	63
	Mary Magdalen	Chigi Chapel, Siena Cathedral, Siena	1659–1663; Sculpture; Marble; Over life-size	63
	Statue of Alexander VII (designed by Bernini, sculpted by Antonio Raggi)	Siena Cathedral, Siena	1661–1663; Sculpture; Marble and gilded bronze	64
Image, online	Busts of Pope Alexander VII		1655–1667; Sculpture; Marble and gilded bronze	65
	Cappella Da Sylva	Sant'Isidoro a Capo le Case, Rome	1663; Sculpture; Marble and gilded bronze	66
	Statues on the colonnades of Saint Peter's Square	St. Peter's Square, Vatican City	1656–1671; Sculpture; Travertine; Monumental	67
	Scala Regia	Apostolic Palace, Vatican City	1663–1666; Sculpture; Marble with painted stucco drapery	68
	The Visitation	Santuario di Nostra Signora della Misericordia (in Italian), Savona	1665; Sculpture; Marble relief Height 300 cm (117 in)	69
	Bust of Louis XIV	Musée National de Versailles, Versailles	1665; Sculpture; Marble; Height 80 cm (31 in)	70
	Statue of King Philip IV of Spain	Santa Maria Maggiore, Rome	1666; Sculpture; Bronze; Over life-size	NA
	Portrait of a Man	Los Angeles County Museum of Art	1670s Sculpture; Marble	NA
	Elephant and Obelisk	Piazza di Santa Maria sopra Minerva, Rome	1667; Sculpture; Marble; Life-size, elephant	71
	List of angels of Ponte Sant'Angelo	Ponte Sant'Angelo, Rome	1667–1669; Sculpture; Marble; Over life-size	72
	Angel with the Crown of Thorns	Sant'Andrea delle Fratte, Rome	1667–1669; Sculpture; Marble; Over life-size	72
	Angel with the Superscription	Sant'Andrea delle Fratte, Rome	1667–1669; Sculpture; Marble; Over life-size	72
	The Vision of Constantine	Apostolic Palace, Vatican City	1654–1670; Sculpture; Marble; Over life-size	73
	Equestrian Statue of King Louis XIV	Palace of Versailles, Versailles	1669–1684; Sculpture; Marble; Monumental	74
	Bust of Gabriele Fonseca	San Lorenzo in Lucina, Rome	1668–1675; Sculpture; Marble; Over life-size	75
	Blessed Ludovica Albertoni	Altieri Chapel, San Francesco a Ripa, Rome	1671–1674; Sculpture; Marble; Over life-size	76
	Tomb of Pope Alexander VII	St. Peter's Basilica, Vatican City	1671–1678; Sculpture; Marble and gilded bronze Over life-size	77
	Chapel of the Blessed Sacrament	St. Peter's Basilica, Vatican City	1673–1675; Sculpture; Gilt bronze	78
	Statue of Pope Clement X	Galleria Nazionale d'Arte Antica, Rome	1676; Sculpture; Marble; Height 105 cm (41 in)	78a
	Bust of the Saviour	San Sebastiano fuori le mura, Rome	1679; Sculpture; Marble; Over life-size	79
