= Saint Sebastian (Bernini) =

Sculpture by Gianlorenzo Bernini

Coordinates: 40°24′58″N 3°41′42″W

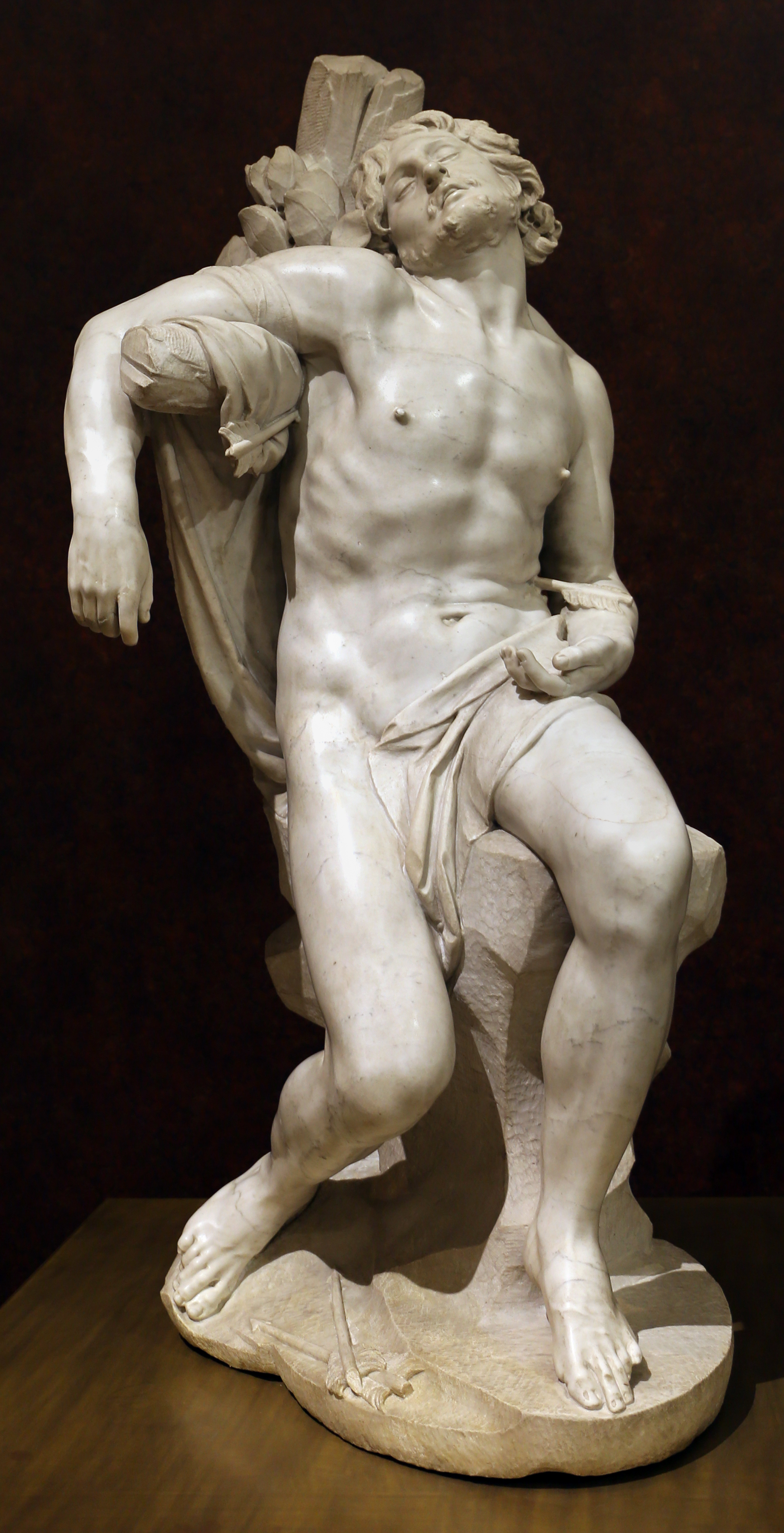
- Artist: Gian Lorenzo Bernini
- Year: 1617–18
- Catalogue: 4
- Type: Sculpture
- Medium: Marble
- Subject: Saint Sebastian
- Dimensions: 98 x 42 cm
- Location: Thyssen-Bornemisza Museum (Carmen Cervera collection); Madrid

Saint Sebastian is an early sculpture by the Italian artist Gian Lorenzo Bernini. Executed in 1617 and 1618, it features the Christian martyr Saint Sebastian pinned to a tree, his flesh filled with arrows. It is smaller than life size. The sculpture is part of the Carmen Cervera's private collection and is currently shown in the Museo Thyssen-Bornemisza in Madrid.

== See also ==
- List of works by Gian Lorenzo Bernini
