= Noli Me Tangere (Bernini) =

Sculptural arrangement by Gianlorenzo Bernini

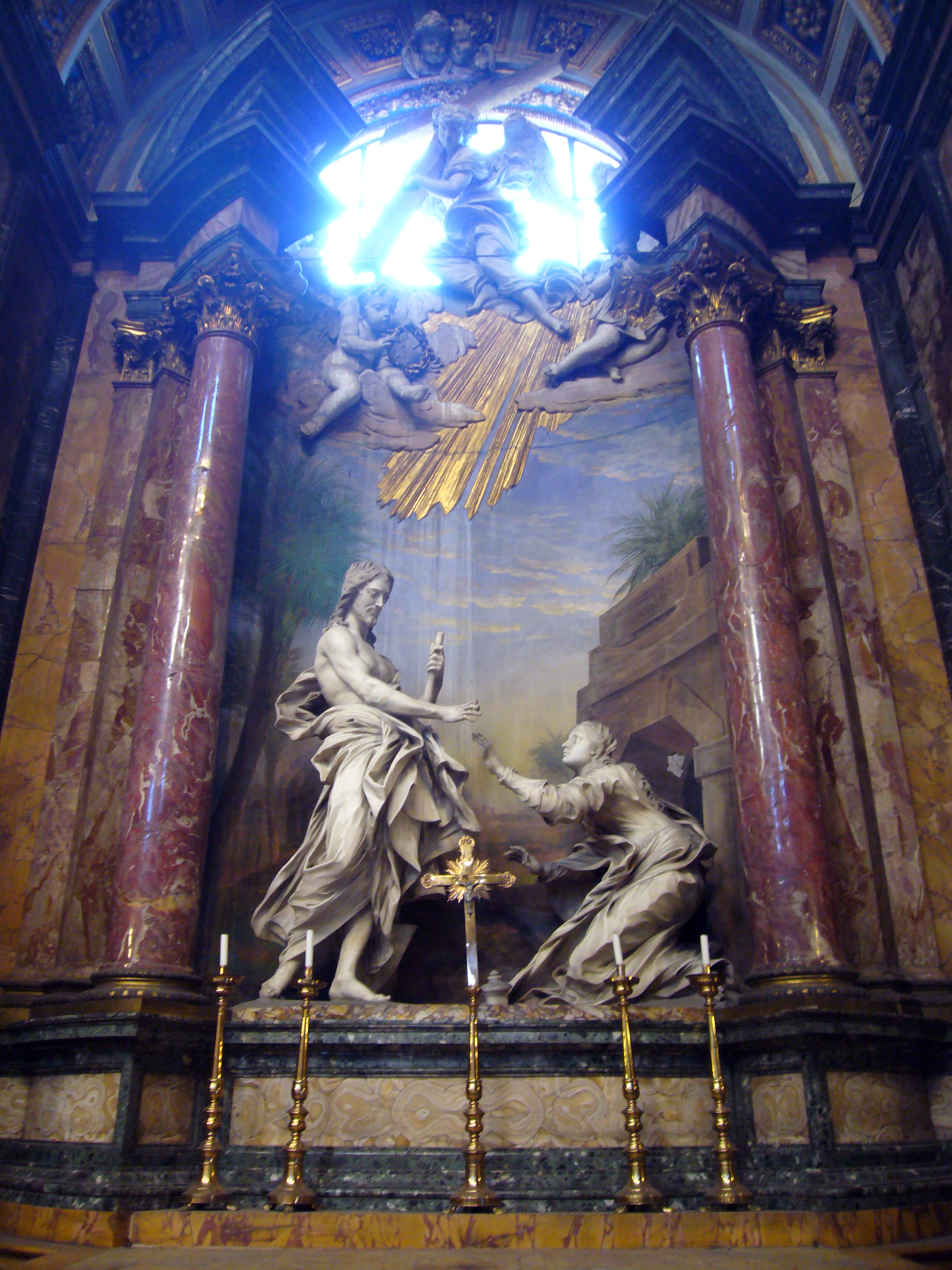
- Noli Me tangere by Antonio Raggi
- Artist: Gian Lorenzo Bernini
- Year: 1649-1652
- Catalogue: 52
- Type: Sculpture
- Medium: Marble
- Location: Santi Domenico e Sisto; Rome
- Preceded by: Busts of Pope Innocent X
- Followed by: Bust of Francesco I d'Este

Noli Me Tangere is a large sculptural arrangement that forms part of the Alaleona Chapel in the church of Santi Domenico e Sisto, in Rome.

The architecutal outline of the chapel was designed by the Italian artist Gianlorenzo Bernini. The sculpture, which shows Jesus responding to Mary Magdalene with the words Do not touch me upon her recognition of him following the Resurrection, was also designed by Bernini and carried out by his pupil Antonio Raggi, probably from 1649 to 1652.

== Preparatory Work ==
A wash drawing exists in the Uffizi Gallery, Florence, that shows the overall design, although it appears that Raggi made some changes to the sculptural group.

== Patronage ==
The chapel was commissioned by Sister Maria Eleonora Alaleona. It is suspected that it was commissioned as an act of penitence for the behaviour of an unnamed relative of hers in 1636 - a nun who had tried to smuggle a lover into her convent only for the lover to suffocate to death in the chest he was hiding in. The donation made was 3,000 Roman scudi (around US$120,000 in contemporary costs.)

== See also ==
- List of works by Gian Lorenzo Bernini
