= Busts of Pope Urban VIII =

Sculptures by Gian Lorenzo Bernini

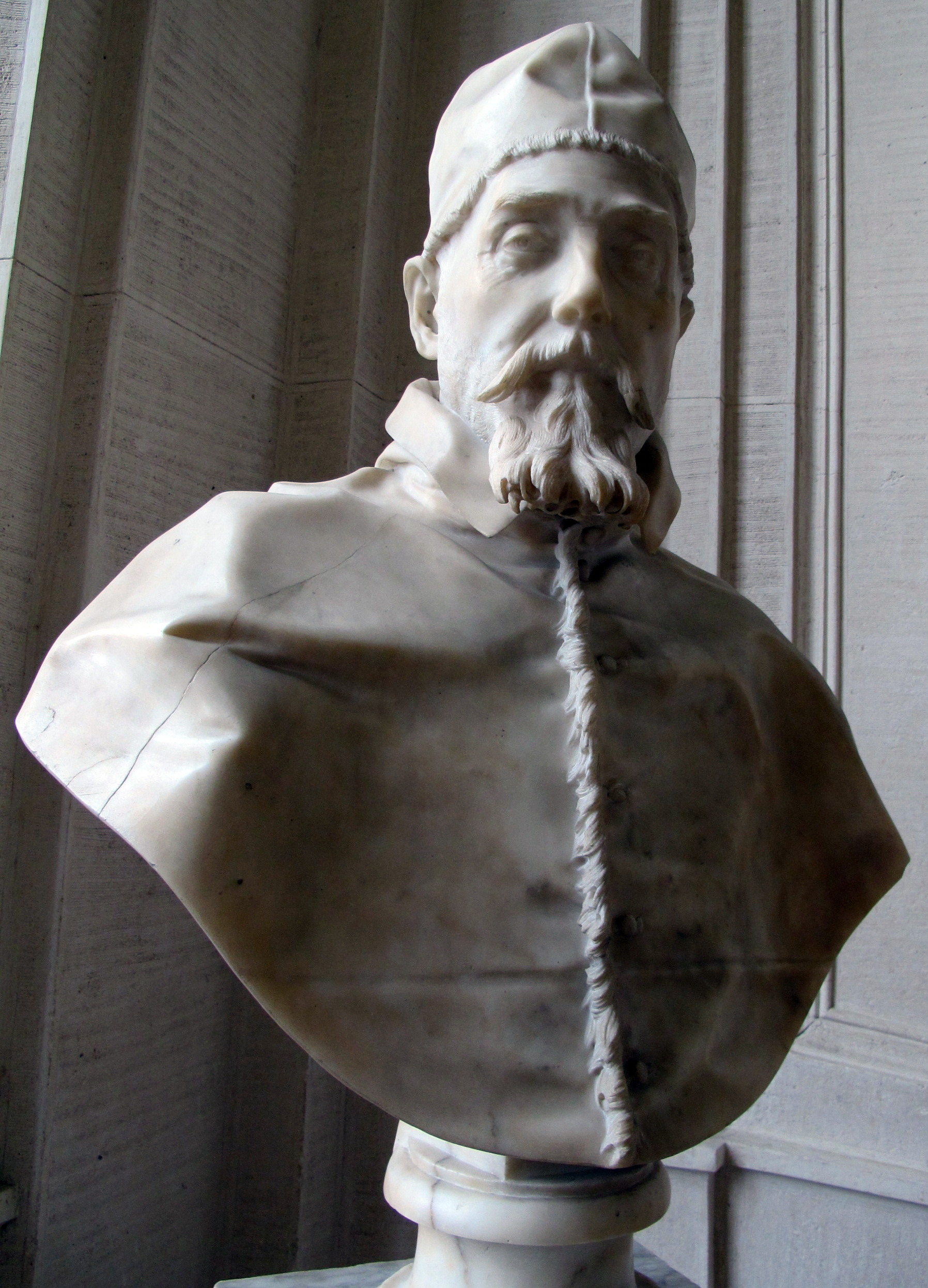
3. Gianlorenzo Bernini, Bust of Urban VIII, 1637-8

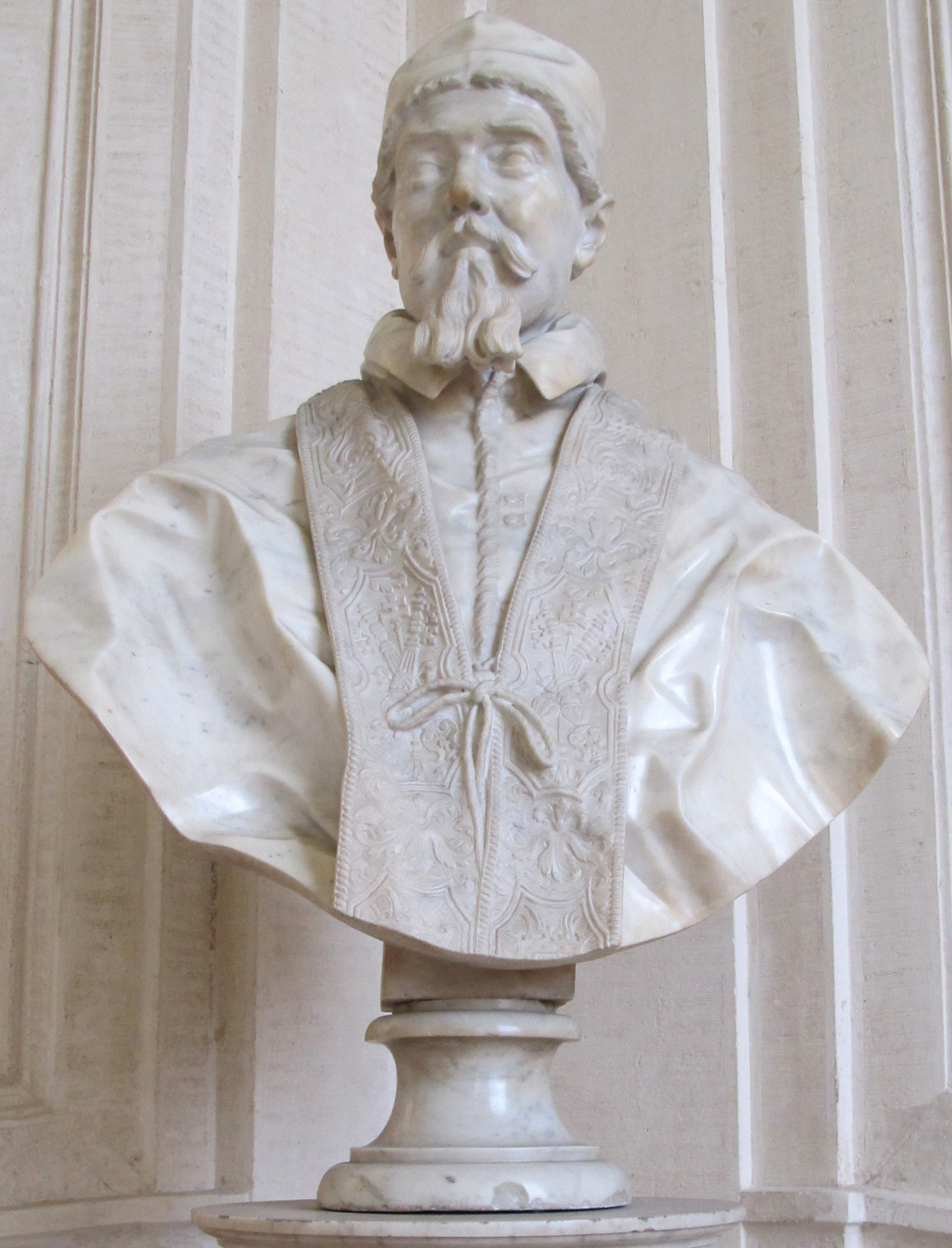
4. Assistant of Gian Lorenzo Bernini, Bust of Urban VIII, early 1640s

Several sculpted busts of Pope Urban VIII were created by the Italian artist Gian Lorenzo Bernini, with varying amounts of assistance from other artists in his workshop:

1. Palazzo Barberini, Rome, 1623–1624. Marble.
2. San Lorenzo in Fonte, 1626. Marble. Assistance by Giuliano Finelli.
3. Galleria Nazionale di Arte, Palazzo Barberini, Rome, 1637–1638. Marble.
4. Galleria Nazionale di Arte, Palazzo Barberini, Rome. Early 1640s. Marble. Largely the work of an assistant.
5. Louvre, Paris. 1640. Bronze.
6. Cathedral of Spoleto, 1642. Bronze.
7. Collection Principe Enrico Barberini. Early 1640s. Porphyry. Adapted from existing antique statue, largely by assistants.
8. Private Collection (Barberini Family). 1658. Bronze

In 2020, the Galleria Borghese began a fund raising campaign to purchase the last bust on this list from the Barberini family.

== See also ==
- List of works by Gian Lorenzo Bernini
