= Busts of Pope Innocent X =

Sculptures by Gianlorenzo Bernini

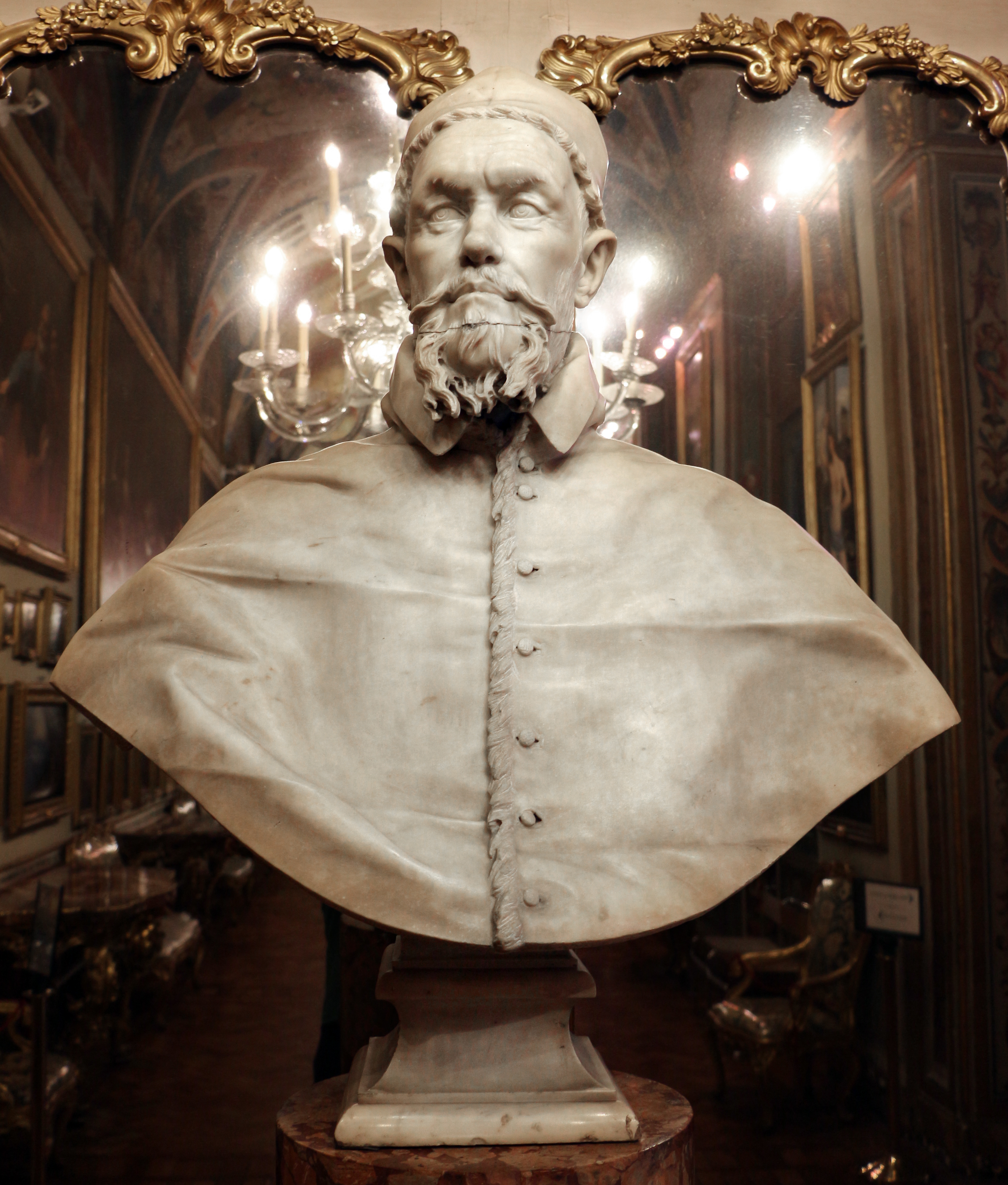
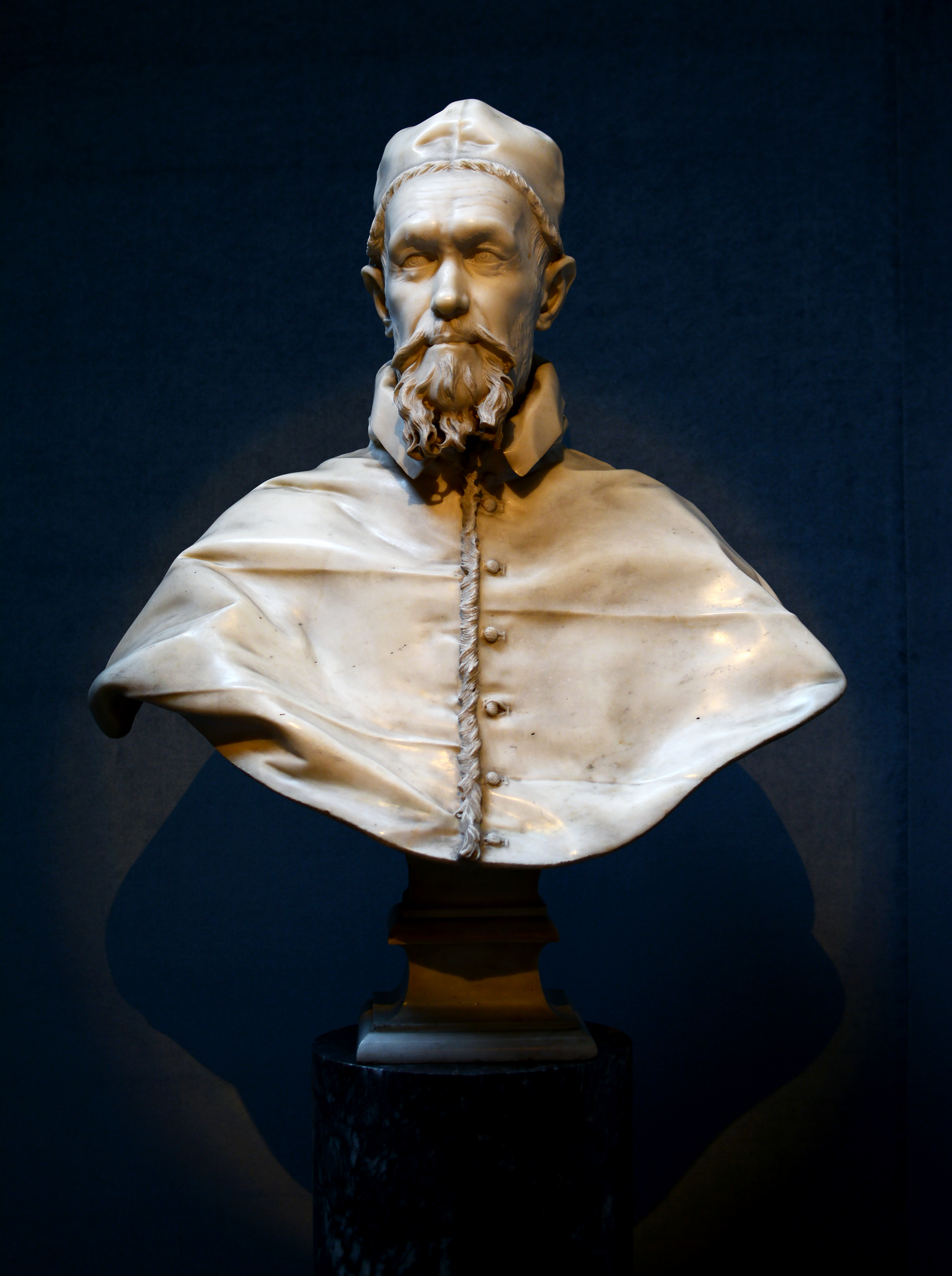
- First version Second version
- Artist: Gian Lorenzo Bernini
- Year: 1650
- Catalogue: 51
- Type: Sculpture
- Medium: Marble
- Location: Doria Pamphilj Gallery, Rome
- Preceded by: Truth Unveiled by Time (Bernini)
- Followed by: Noli Me Tangere (Bernini)

The Busts of Pope Innocent X are two portrait busts by the Italian artist Gianlorenzo Bernini of Pope Innocent X, Giovanni Battista Pamphili. Created around 1650, both sculptures are now in the Galleria Doria Pamphili in Rome. Like the two busts of Cardinal Scipione Borghese, it is believed that Bernini created a second version of the bust once a flaw was discovered in the first version. There exist several similar versions of the bust done by other artists, most notably Alessandro Algardi.

== See also ==
- List of works by Gian Lorenzo Bernini
