= Portrait of Unknown Man (Bernini) =

Sculpture by Gian Lorenzo Bernini

Portrait of a Man
- Artist: Gian Lorenzo Bernini
- Year: 1670-1675
- Type: Sculpture
- Medium: Marble
- Location: LACMA, Ahmanson Building, Level 3; Los Angeles
- Website: Image and background of The Portrait of a Man

The Portrait of Unknown Man is a sculptural bust by the Italian seventeenth-century artist Gianlorenzo Bernini. In 2015, it was acquired by the Los Angeles County Museum of Art.

== See also ==
- List of works by Gian Lorenzo Bernini
