= The Goat Amalthea with the Infant Jupiter and a Faun =

Sculpture by Gian Lorenzo Bernini

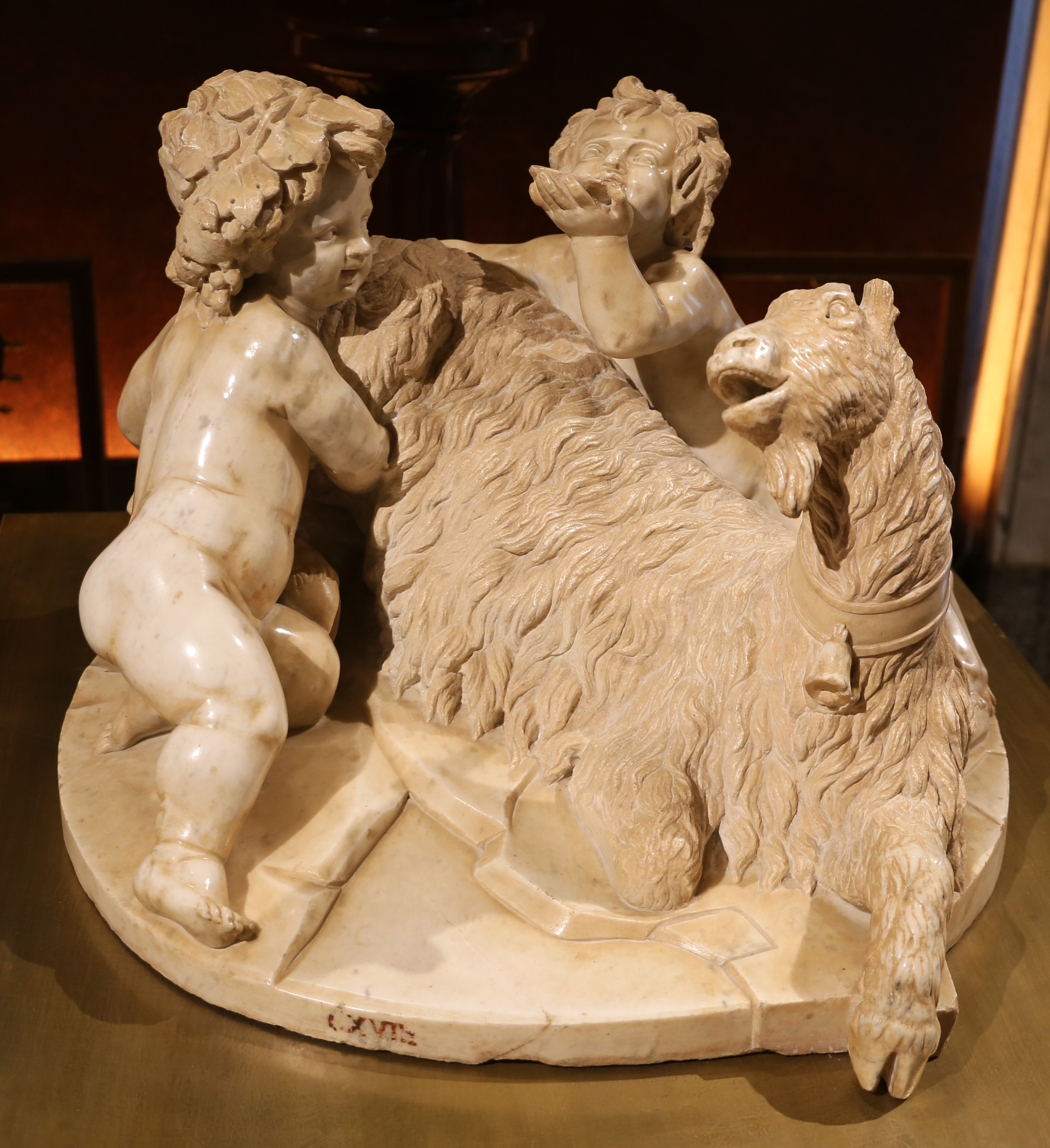
- Artist: Gian Lorenzo Bernini
- Year: 1609–1615
- Catalogue: 1
- Type: Sculpture
- Medium: Carrara marble
- Dimensions: 44 cm (17 in)
- Location: Galleria Borghese; Rome
- Followed by: Bust of Giovanni Battista Santoni

The Goat Amalthea with the Infant Jupiter and a Faun is the earliest known work by the Italian artist Gian Lorenzo Bernini. Produced sometime between 1609 and 1615, the sculpture is now in the Borghese Collection at the Galleria Borghese in Rome.

== Background ==
According to Filippo Baldinucci, even before Pietro Bernini moved his family from Naples to Rome, eight-year-old Gian Lorenzo created a "small marble head of a child that was the marvel of everyone". Throughout his teenage years, he produced numerous images containing putti, chubby male children usually nude and sometimes winged. Distinct from cherubim, who represent the second order of angels, these putti figures were secular and presented a non-religious passion.

Of the three surviving marble groups of putti that can be attributed to Bernini, The Goat Amalthea with the Infant Jupiter and a Faun is the only one that is approximately dateable. In 1615, a carpenter was paid for providing a wooden pedestal for the sculpture group. Some writers date the work as early as 1609, based on stylistic grounds and an interpretation of the 1615 pedestal invoice indicating that the base was a replacement.

== Description ==
The sculpture shows Amalthea as a goat, the infant god Jupiter, and an infant Faun.

== See also ==
- List of works by Gian Lorenzo Bernini
