= Bust of Giovanni Vigevano =

Sculpture by Gian Lorenzo Bernini

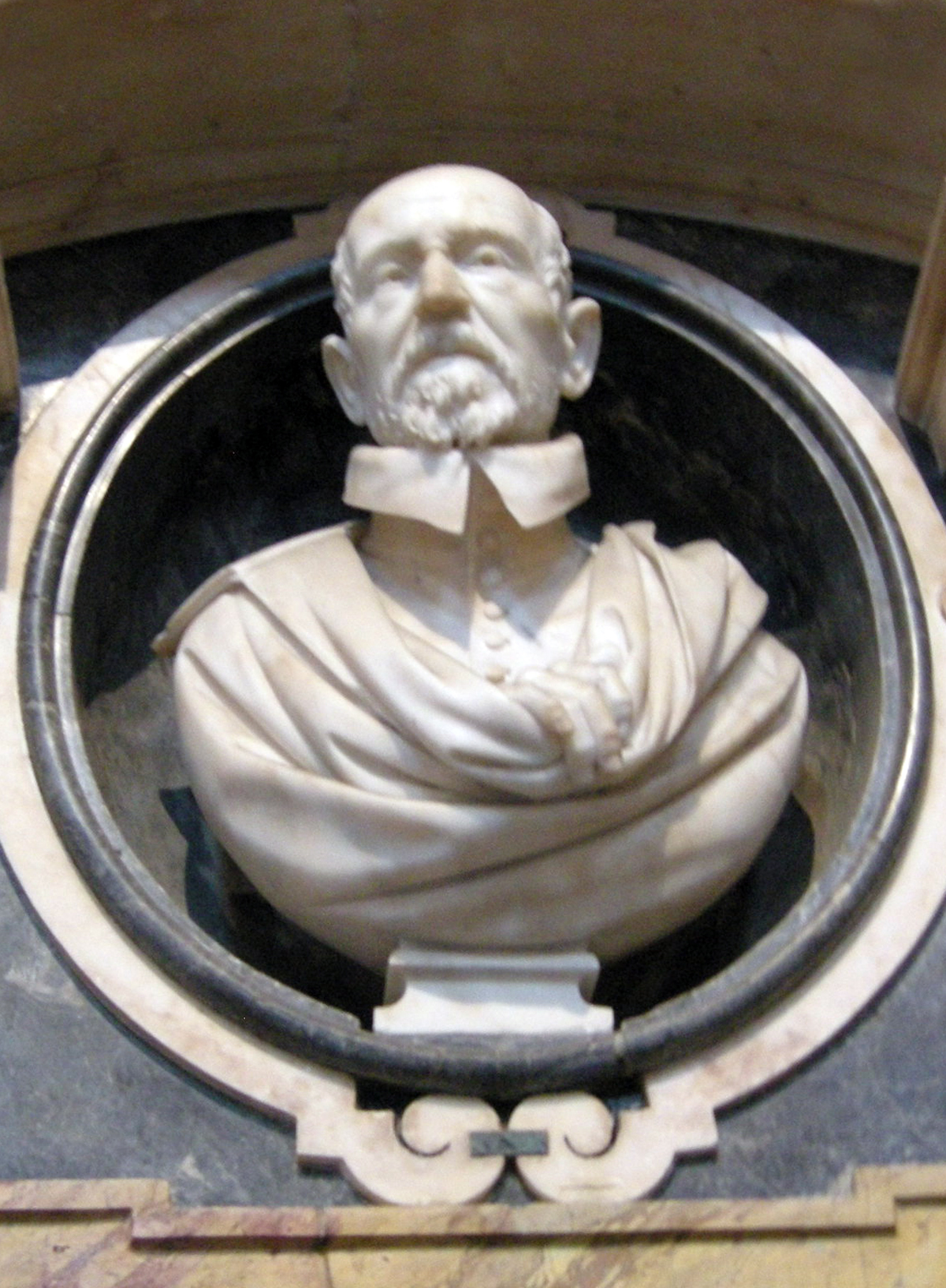
- Artist: Gian Lorenzo Bernini
- Year: 1617–1618
- Catalogue: 5
- Type: Sculpture
- Medium: Marble
- Subject: Giovanni Vigevano
- Dimensions: Life-size
- Location: Santa Maria sopra Minerva; Rome; 41°53′53″N 12°28′42″E

The bust of Giovanni Vigevano is a marble sculptural portrait by the Italian artist Gian Lorenzo Bernini. The bust was produced between 1617 and 1618, and was then inserted into Vigevano's tomb after he died in 1630. The tomb is in the church of Santa Maria sopra Minerva in Rome.

== Gallery ==
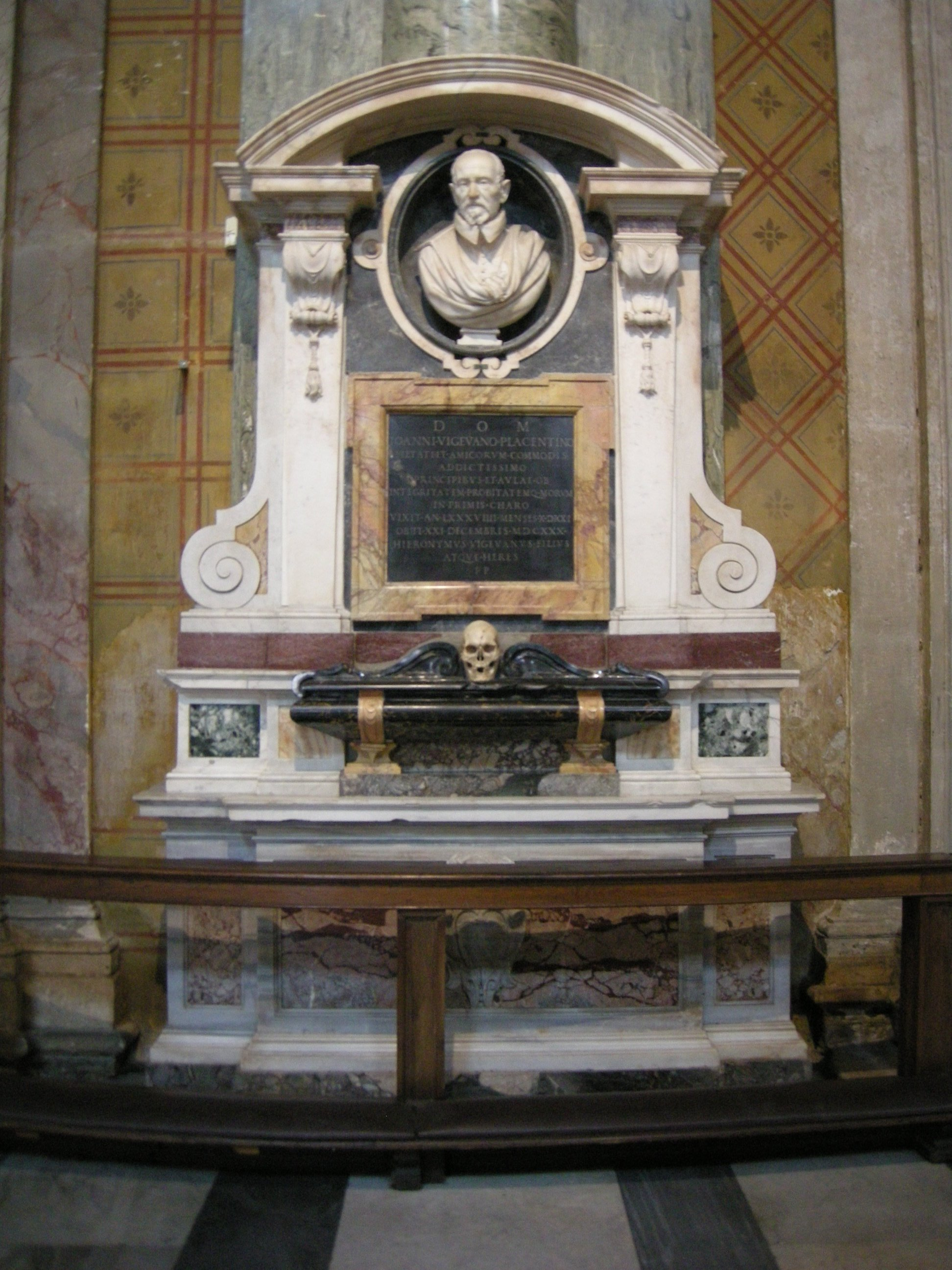
Tomb of Giovanni Vigevano

== See also ==
- List of works by Gian Lorenzo Bernini
