= Peter Verpoorten =

Italian artist

- Born: Early 17th century Flanders
- Died: 1659; Rome, Papal States
- Education: Active in Mechelen
- Known for: Sculpture
- Notable work: Eternal lamp of the Chigi Chapel
- Movement: Baroque
- Patrons: Gian Lorenzo Bernini

Peter Verpoorten (also known as Pietro Della Porta, Pietro or Peter La Porta, and Pietro or Peter Varportel) (early 17th century – 1659) was a Flemish sculptor. He was a bronze specialist and a collaborator of Gian Lorenzo Bernini. In 1658 he was named the latter's assistant.

Verpoorten was born in Flanders in the early 17th century. In Flanders, he was reportedly active in Mechelen. He then moved to Rome, probably around 1656.

In Rome, Verpoorten became associated with Gian Lorenzo Bernini and his circle. Between 1658 and 1659 he collaborated with Bernini and Gioacchino Francesco Travani on the Medallion of Androclus and the Lion (designed by Bernini), probably making the first clay model. In fact, in October 1658 a payment to "monsù Pietro Verpetren" (his name was often misspelled) "a bon conto delle cose che fa per servitio della Medaglia con il ritratto di N.S.r Ales.ro 7" was issued. Another payment, likely with respect to his work on the medallion, was issued to Verpoorten in August 1658. Finally, in 1659 Verpoorten received a third payment "a conto de' modelli". Verpoorten was a collaborator of Bernini, working with him, for example, on the Chair of St. Peter in St. Peter's Basilica in the Vatican. In 1658, Verpoorten was appointed assistant to Bernini, as a specialist in bronze casting. His best known work in collaboration with Bernini is the eternal lamp of the Chigi Chapel in the Basilica of Santa Maria del Popolo. This bronze sanctuary lamp (which forms a gilded crown hanging on chains, decorated with the eight-pointed stars of the Chigi and supported by three flying cherubs) was modeled by Verpoorten for Bernini.

However, both Verpoorten's collaboration with Bernini and his own career were short, as he died in Rome in 1659.
