= Raimondi Chapel =

Chapel in the church of San Piero in Montorio, Rome

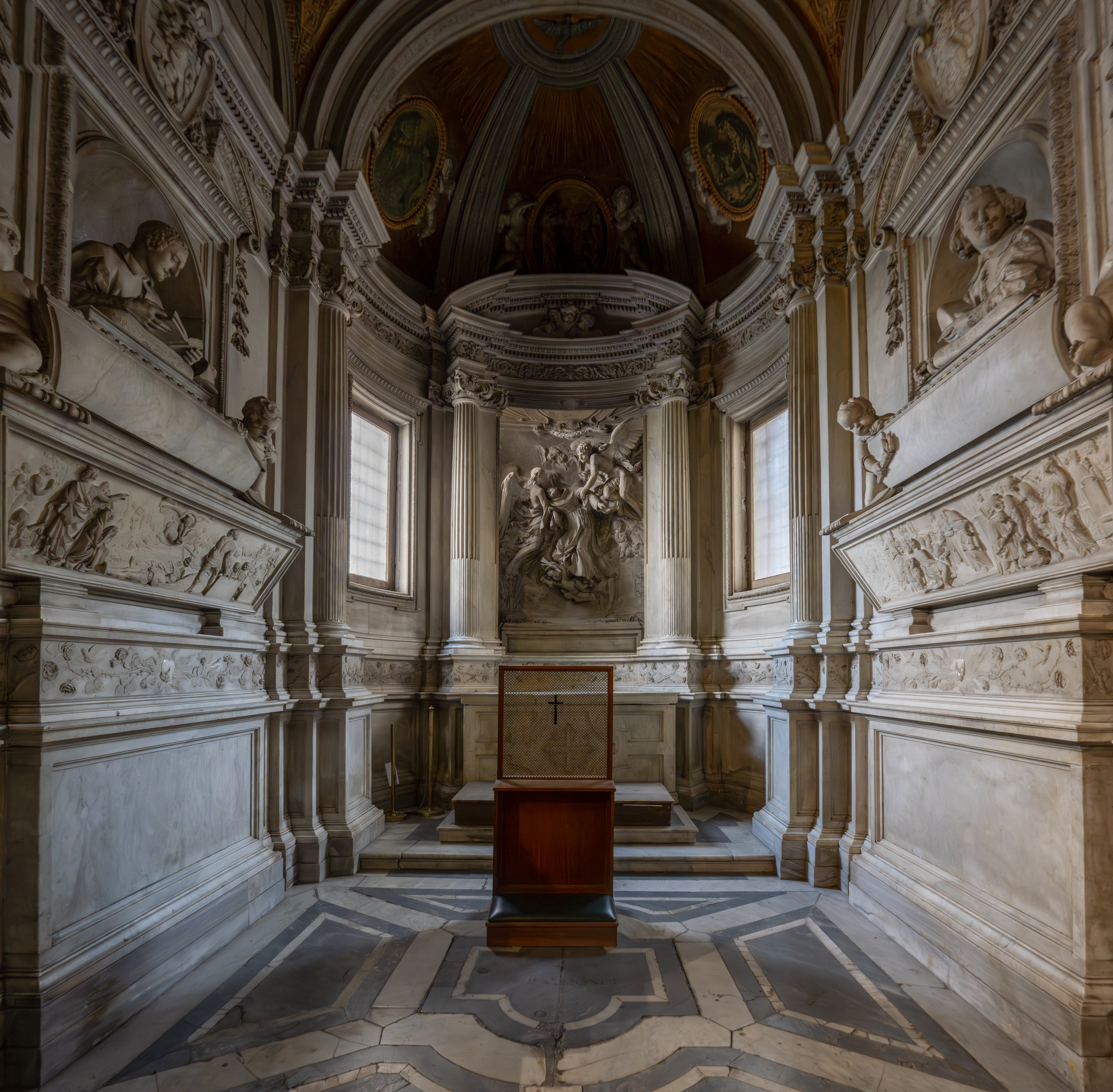
- Artist: Gian Lorenzo Bernini
- Year: 1638-1648
- Catalogue: 46
- Location: San Pietro in Montorio; Rome
- Preceded by: Memorial to Maria Raggi
- Followed by: Ecstasy of Saint Teresa

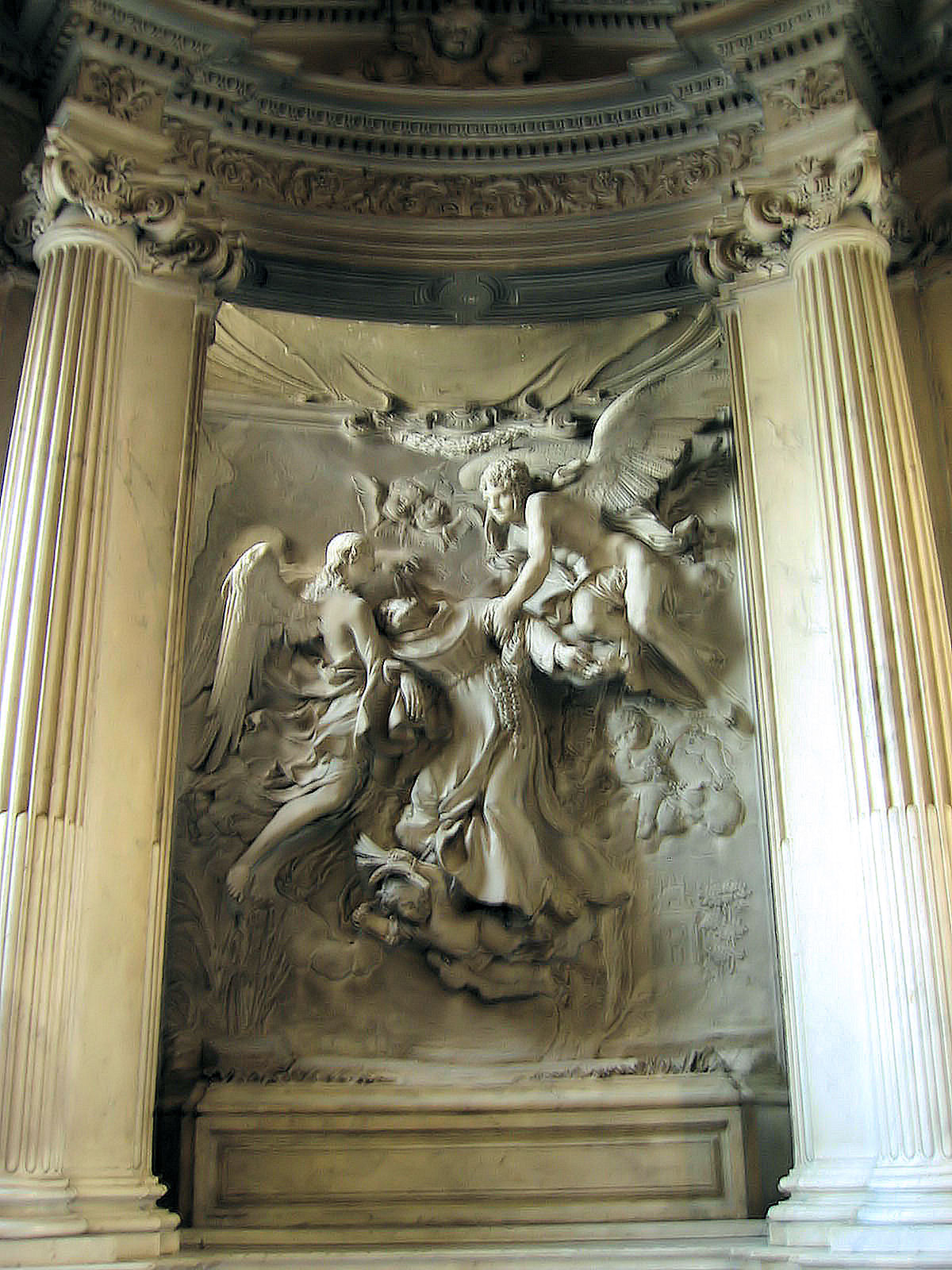
Francesco Baratta, Saint Francis in Ecstasy, c. 1640. Altarpiece of Raimondi Chapel, San Pietro in Montorio.

The Raimondi Chapel, originally the De Raymondi Chapel (Italian: Cappella De Raymondi), is a chapel within the church of San Pietro in Montorio, Rome, Italy. The commonly used modern name reflects an Italianized form of the family surname. The chapel houses the tombs of two members of the De Raymondi family, Francesco and Raimondo. Both the architectural and sculptural elements of the chapel were designed by the artist Gianlorenzo Bernini - it was one of Bernini's first works where the relationship between the sculpture and the architecture was considered as a whole. Elements of the sculptures were executed by other artists in Bernini's circle; Andrea Bolgi did the busts of the two De Raymondi brothers and the accompanying putti. Niccolò Sale undertook the reliefs on the tombs, while Francesco Baratta did the larger relief in the central altar. Work on the chapel took place between 1638 and 1648.

== See also ==
- List of works by Gian Lorenzo Bernini
