= A Faun Teased by Children =

Sculpture by Gianlorenzo and Pietro Bernini

Bacchanal: A Faun Teased by Children
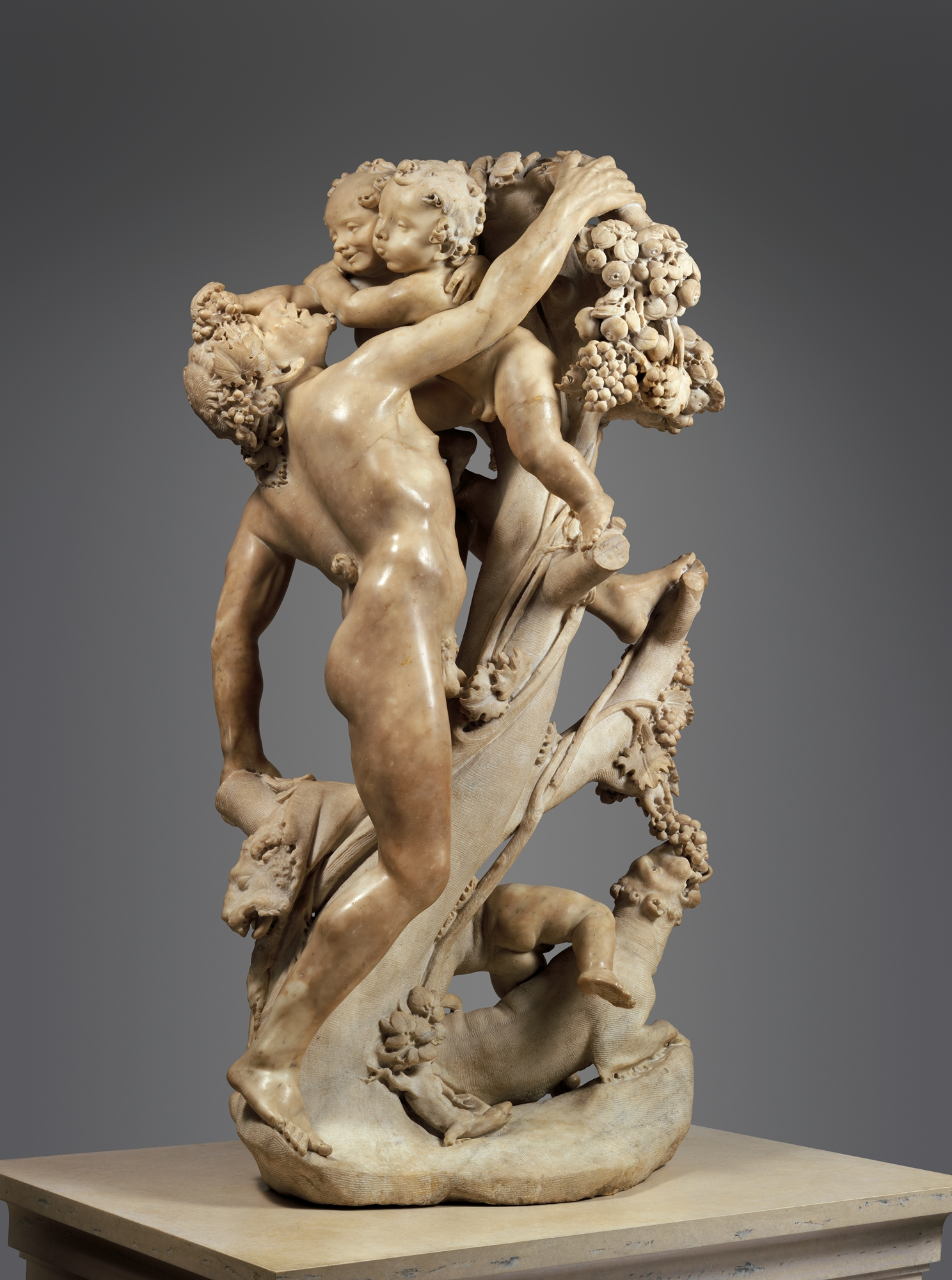
- Artist: Gian Lorenzo Bernini
- Year: 1616–1617
- Type: Sculpture
- Medium: Marble
- Dimensions: 132 cm (52 in)
- Location: Metropolitan Museum of Art; New York; 40.77891°N 73.96367°W

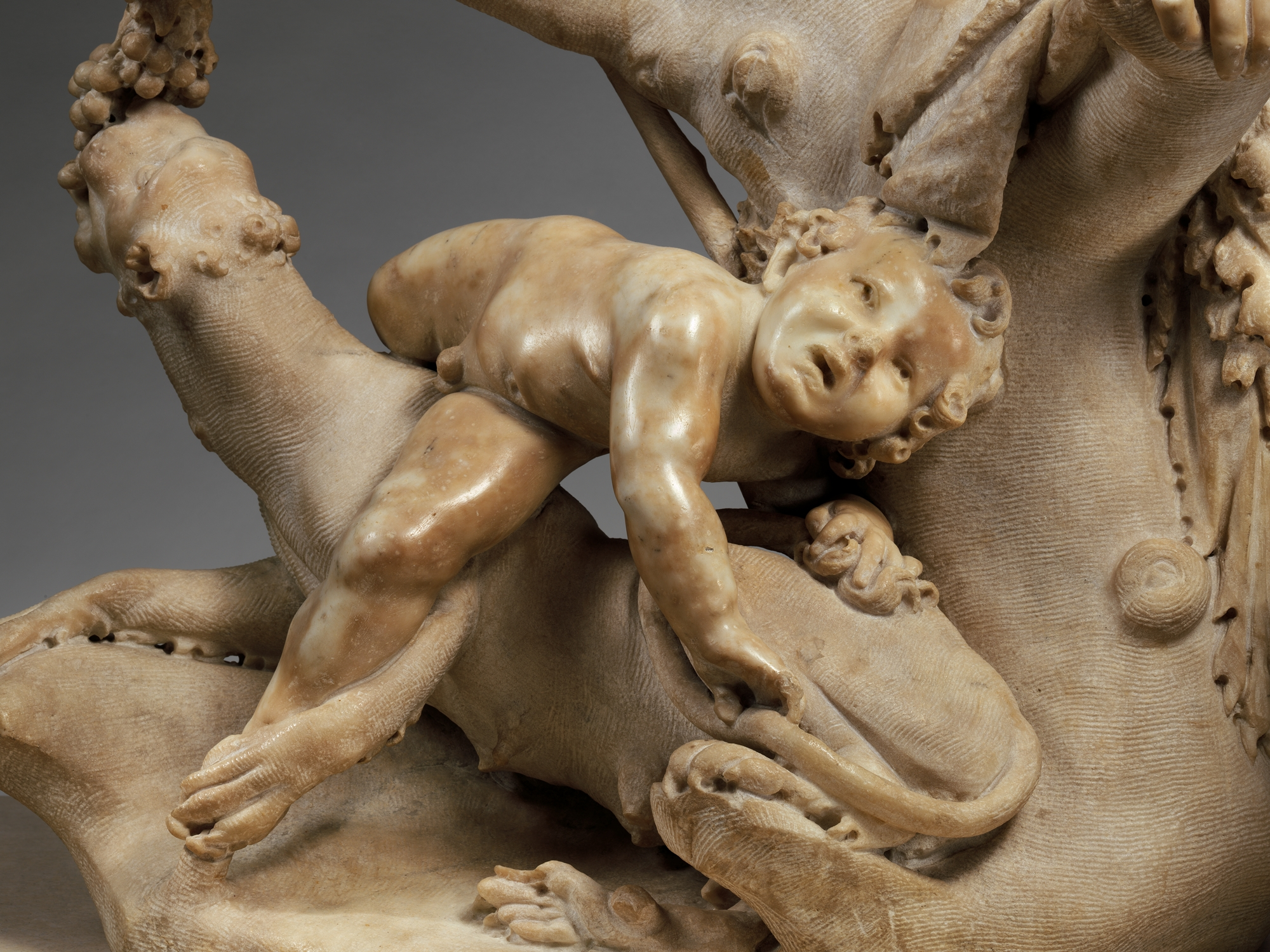
A closer view of one of the Children teased by the Faun.

Bacchanal: A Faun Teased by Children is a marble sculpture by Italian artists Gian Lorenzo Bernini and his father Pietro Bernini. It was executed in 1616 and 1617, when Gian Lorenzo was not yet twenty years old. It is currently in the Metropolitan Museum of Art in New York.

== History ==
For a long time, the sculpture was kept in storage at Gianlorenzo Bernini’s own house number 11 on via della Mercede in Rome. At the time, the sculpture was not identified as a work of Bernini. A significant blemish in the sculpture may be the reason why the work remained in storage for so long. The lower part of one putti's left arm was not finished at the elbow. The thin portion of marble that was left was inadequate to finish carving the defective arm. This mistake may have scared off prospective patrons meaning that the sculpture remained in Bernini’s home. Furthermore, Bernini himself may have viewed this sculpture, which could reasonably be considered an unfinished and blemished exercise from his youth, as having little value. Publications have pointed out that Bernini’s disregard for his drawings points towards him perhaps having a mentality that places more value on unflawed, finished works. These two reasons could maybe explain why the work remained unidentified in Bernini’s own house for so long. The sculpture eventually made its way to a French collection sometime in the 20th century before inconspicuously appearing at a Paris auction house in 1972 where it was sold. The following year, the sculpture appeared on the London market where it was sold yet again. When the work appeared in London, it was identified as an early work of Gianlorenzo Bernini by Federico Zeri. Shortly afterwards in 1976, the Metropolitan Museum was able to purchase the group. Critics have noted that the classicism of its motifs and the superb carving and drilling technique make this sculpture one of the best Roman works of the early seventeenth-century.

== Description ==
The intricate marble sculpture consists of five figures and portrays a lighthearted fight between a faun and two putti. The sculpture, which was carved from a very shallow block, is roughly 4 ft (1.2 m) tall, 3 ft (0.91 m) wide, and just 18 in (460 mm) deep. In the sculpture, the faun stands with one leg on either side of a central tree he is climbing. The faun’s left hand is grasping a tree stump and his left leg is supported by a different stump. As he attempts to reach for a branch further up the tree that holds fruit, his head is being forced backwards by two putti that are situated just below the fruit-laden branch. There is an animal on the ground that has been variably described as a dog, lioness, or panther by scholars. This animal is lifting its head to feed on the grapes dangling from a branch as a putto stumbles over it. What has been described by scholars as either a lion’s pelt or a panther’s skin hangs over the tree’s lower rear branch. The marble used for this sculpture generally has a warm honey-colored tone. This tone is paler at the animal’s coat and the tree trunk and more brown at the bodies of the Faun and putti. The entire sculpture is well supported and stabilized by the use of legs and arms as reinforcements to support the structure. Adequate weight at the bottom of the structure prevents it from tipping over.

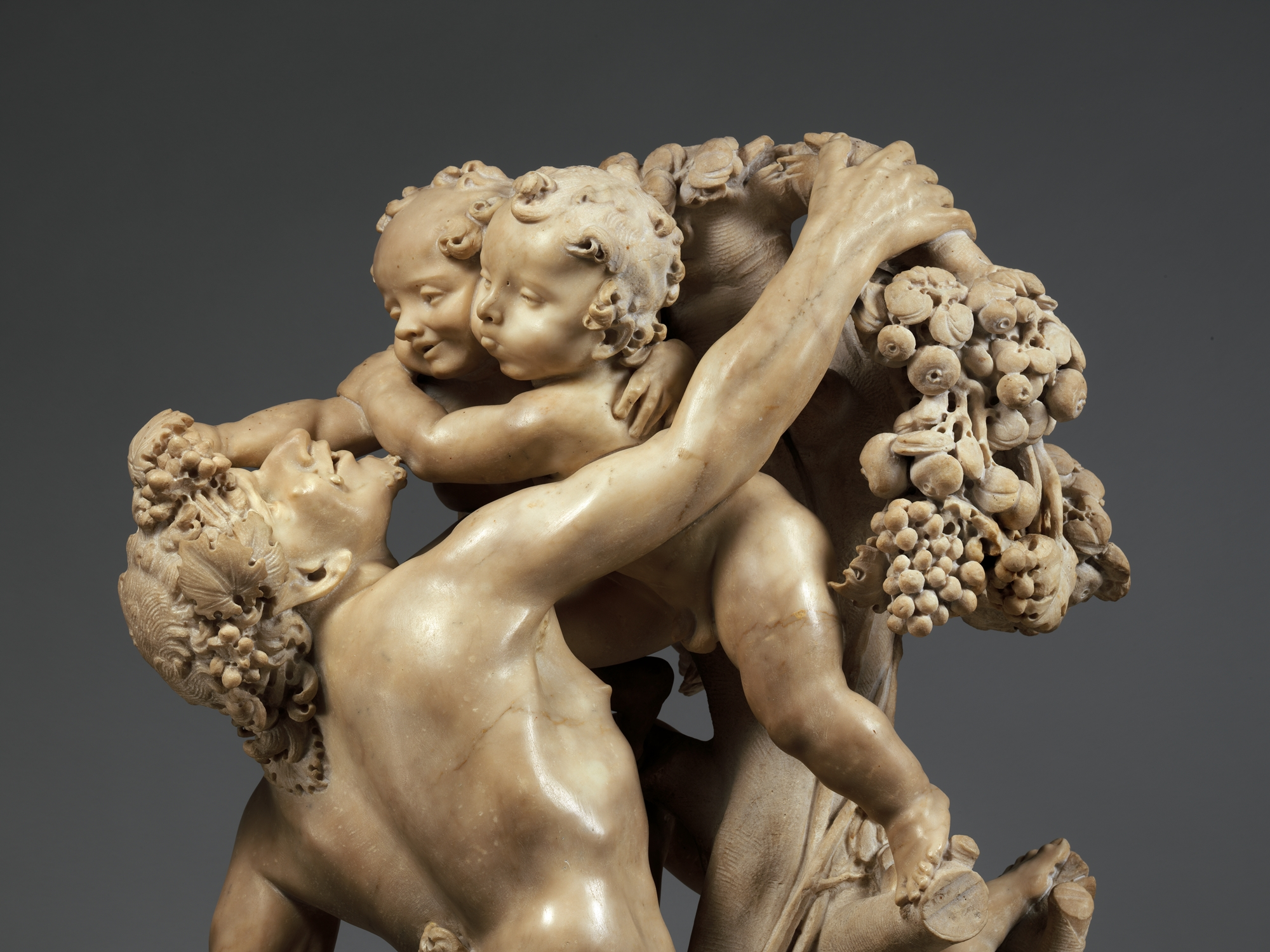
Closer view of the faces of the Faun and two of the Children.

== Interpretations ==
Both satyrs and fauns have pointed ears, small tails, and comparable facial features but satyrs also have the legs of a goat. Because the figure in this sculpture does not have the legs of a goat, it is formally characterized as a faun. Similarly, the three children, who could be confused for cupids, lack wings and are thus formally characterized as putti. This sculpture is characterized as a bacchic group because of the presence of the lion’s pelt hanging over the lower rear branch and the panther on the ground. These two objects are symbolic of the god of wine, Bacchus. Bacchic groups like this one were not uncommon in early seventeenth-century Rome and Florence. The sculpture’s exact iconography is not clear. One possible meaning derives from the fact that, in Renaissance times, the god Pan, satyrs, and fauns were all linked to the idea of lust. The faun represents a somewhat intoxicated Pan who is trying to collect fruit. This particular fruit is the fruit of eternal love because a living vine is wrapped around the dead tree holding the fruit. Pan is being held back by two putti who, in this interpretation, are cupids. These cupids are teasing Pan because he cannot understand the difference between earthly lust and divine, heavenly love. Another possible interpretation similarly promotes the idea that this sculpture represents a juxtaposition between divine love and earthly lust. Instead of teasing the faun (who is symbolic of animalistic lust), the two putti, symbolic of divine love, are spurning his indecorous aggression.

== Influences ==
The inspiration for this sculpture came to some extent from Virgil’s Tenth Eclogue which discusses the idea of unrequited love. It has been proposed that Gianlorenzo may have been influenced by Annibale Carracci’s Farnese frescoes which he studied thoroughly and carefully copied. The flowing outlines and fusion of classicism and naturalism in this sculpture can also be found in Caracci’s Triumph of Bacchus and Ariadne. Another possible source of inspiration that has been mentioned by scholars is Giulio Romano’s Giuochi di Putti. This series of tapestries depicts putti climbing trees while fighting in a lighthearted manner. It has been suggested that the climbing stance of the faun was taken from one of the Niobids. In carving the idealized faces of the two putti higher up the tree, Gianlorenzo may have been attempting to mimic the features that he himself had inherited from his father. The lofting of significant parts of the marble statue (the faun’s head, the two putti, and the vegetation on the tree) foreshadows how Gianlorenzo would loft significant sections of marble in later great works such as Aeneas and Anchises, Pluto and Proserpina, and Apollo and Daphne.

== See also ==
- Faun
- List of works by Gian Lorenzo Bernini
