= Fondation pour la mémoire de l'esclavage =

French organization

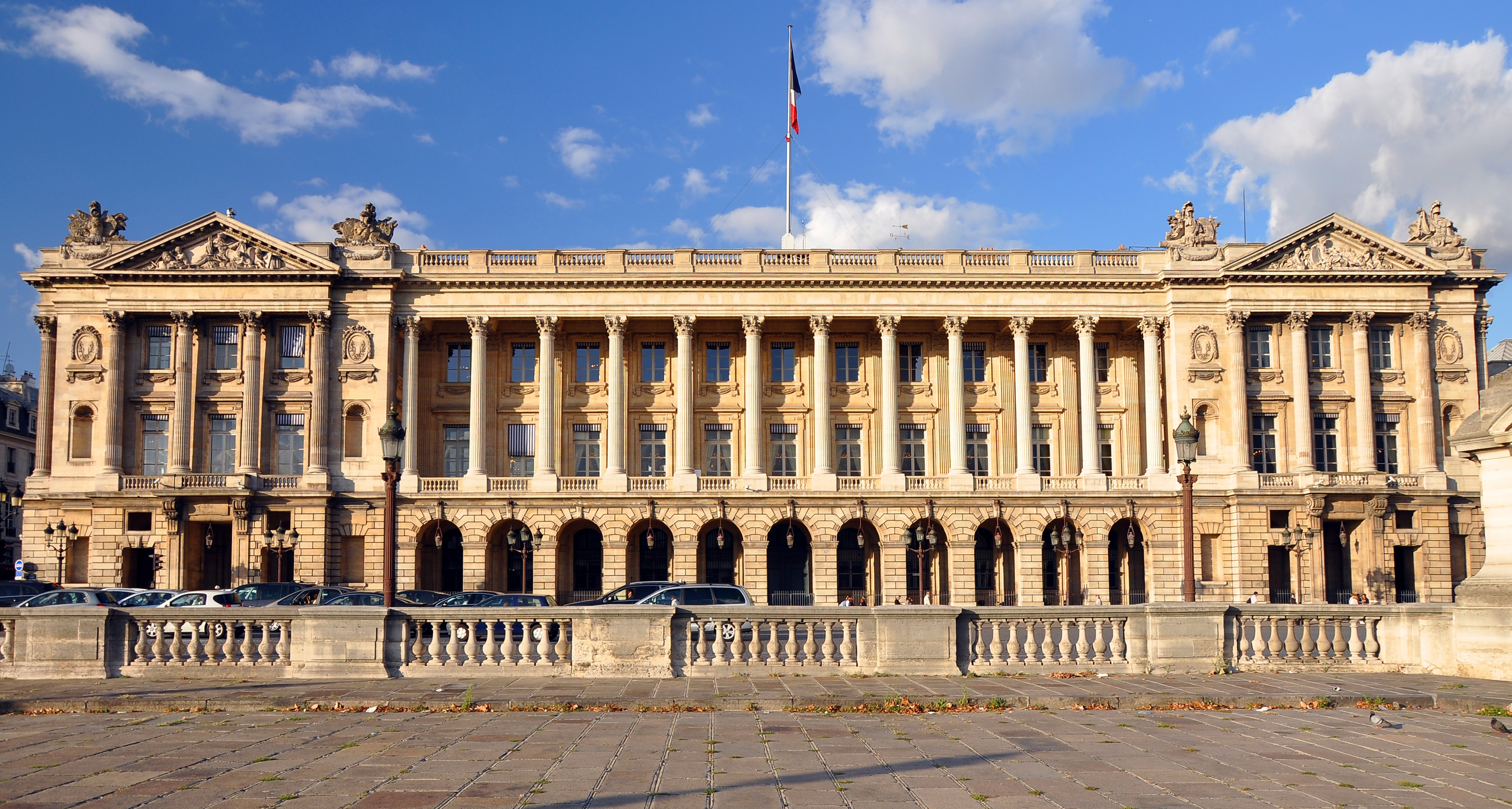
- L'Hôtel de la Marine in Paris, foundation headquarter
- Formation: November 12, 2019; 6 years ago
- Headquarters: Hôtel de la Marine (Paris)
- Leader: Jean-Marc Ayrault
- President: Aïssata Seck
- Website: https://memoire-esclavage.org/en

The Fondation pour la mémoire de l'esclavage (Foundation for the Remembrance of Slavery) is a French institution whose mission is to support research or transmission projects on the slave trade, colonial slavery and their abolition, as well as the fight against racism and the promotion of intercultural dialogue.

== History ==
On May 10, 2016, French President François Hollande announced the project of creating a foundation for the remembrance of Slave Trade, Slavery and their Abolitions. Lionel Zinsou, former Prime Minister of Benin, chaired the preparatory mission for this foundation.

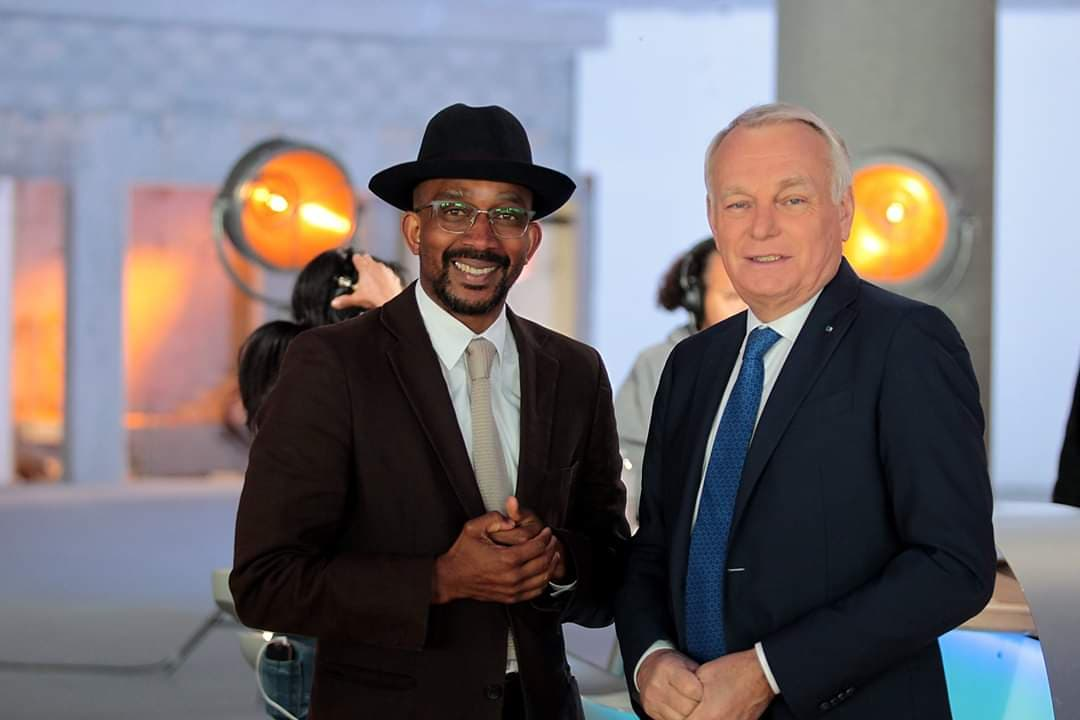
Karfa Diallo and Jean-Marc Ayrault in 2020

Officially established in 2019 and recognized as a public utility institution, the foundation is based in the Hôtel de la Marine in Paris, the former Ministry of Colonies where the second abolition decree was signed in April 1848. It is chaired by former Prime Minister Jean-Marc Ayrault.

In 2026, the foundation commemorated the 25th anniversary of the Taubira Act, which recognized slavery as a crime against humanity. It is preparing a major exhibition for 2027 to make the history of slavery in France accessible to a wider audience.

== See also ==
- Memorial to the Abolition of Slavery
- Musée d'Aquitaine
