= Yves Gentet =

French engineer and artist (born 1965)

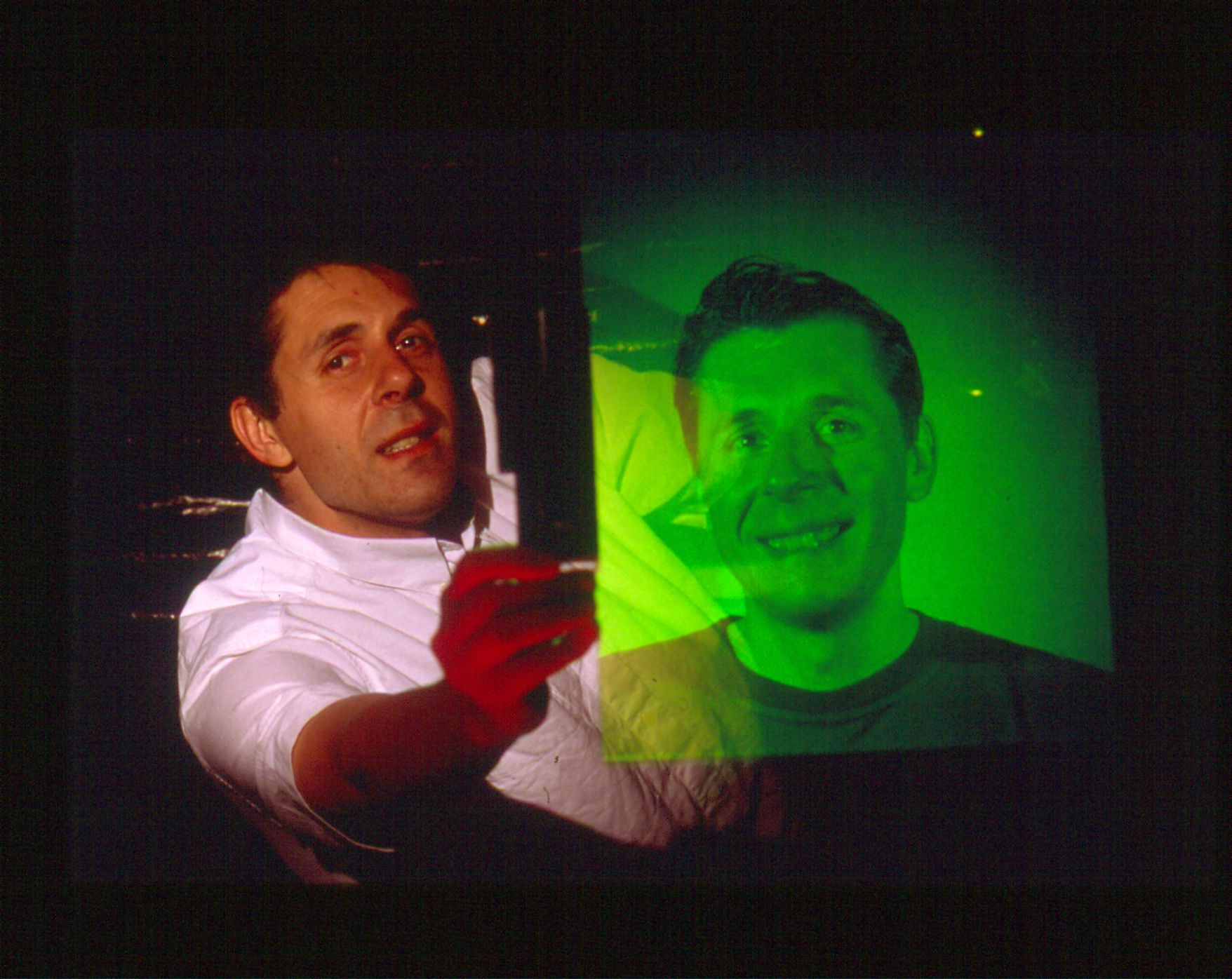

Yves Gentet (born 1965) is a French engineer and artist, known for the invention of a creative method of holograms in colour Ultimate and a 3D holographic printer Chimera.

He is a Physics Engineer specialising in lasers and is graduate ENSSAT. Yves Gentet first worked on aiming hologram systems of fighter aircraft Rafale from Dassault (Head Up Display).

In 1993 he invented the Holomaton, a mobile camera with which he recorded holographic portraits and objects in museums, including the Bronze Hercules from the Museum of Aquitaine . Its great portability was verified on the island of Saint-Barthélemy in 1997, where portraits of living people and animals from the island are recorded, including an iguana. The works were then exhibited in Gustavia at night in the port. In 1995, his exhibition "Le Palais de Holograms" during the Bordeaux International Fair which presents its artistic work on an area of 400 m^{2} and is attended by 200,000 visitors. Since then, his holograms have been exhibited regularly in France and abroad.

From 1995, he developed a new process, called Ultimate, which made it possible to record colour holograms using three lasers (red, blue and green) instead of the traditional process, which only used a red laser. The originality of this technique lies in the development of an emulsion with silver grains in gelatin, which is capable of recording much more information than the usual techniques, thanks to a much smaller grain diameter ( the grain of silver has a diameter of the order of a nanometer) to the usual grains. He won two Excellence in Holography Awards in 2001 for Ultimate, which launched the material's commercialization worldwide. These plaques are used by many companies, universities and artists around the world, and in particular on the International Space Station in 2019 for 9 months and for the Very Large Telescope of Chile in 2020.

In 2000, he also developed a hologram recording material for hobbyists, schools or universities, that are very easy to use and without toxic product. In 2020 the Lycée Jacques CARTIER won the first national prize at the Physics Olympics using these plates.

In 2009, he invented the first mobile device allowing IN SITUE shooting of colour holograms. He recorded rare butterfly box holograms with collectors, holograms recognized as exceptional worldwide and presented at the MIT Museum and other optical museums around the world.

In 2015, he received the Denisyuk Medal from the Russian Academy of Optics, for all of his work on colour holography.

In 2018, he invented "CHIMERA", a revolutionary 3D colour holographic printer using his Ultimate plates, low-power continuous lasers, an opto-mechanical system that overcomes vibration problems and calculation software, both of his design. This machine is able to generate digital holograms with unmatched quality in terms of image resolution, field of view and colour saturation.

In 2020 he won 2 IHMA holography Awards for CHIMERA .

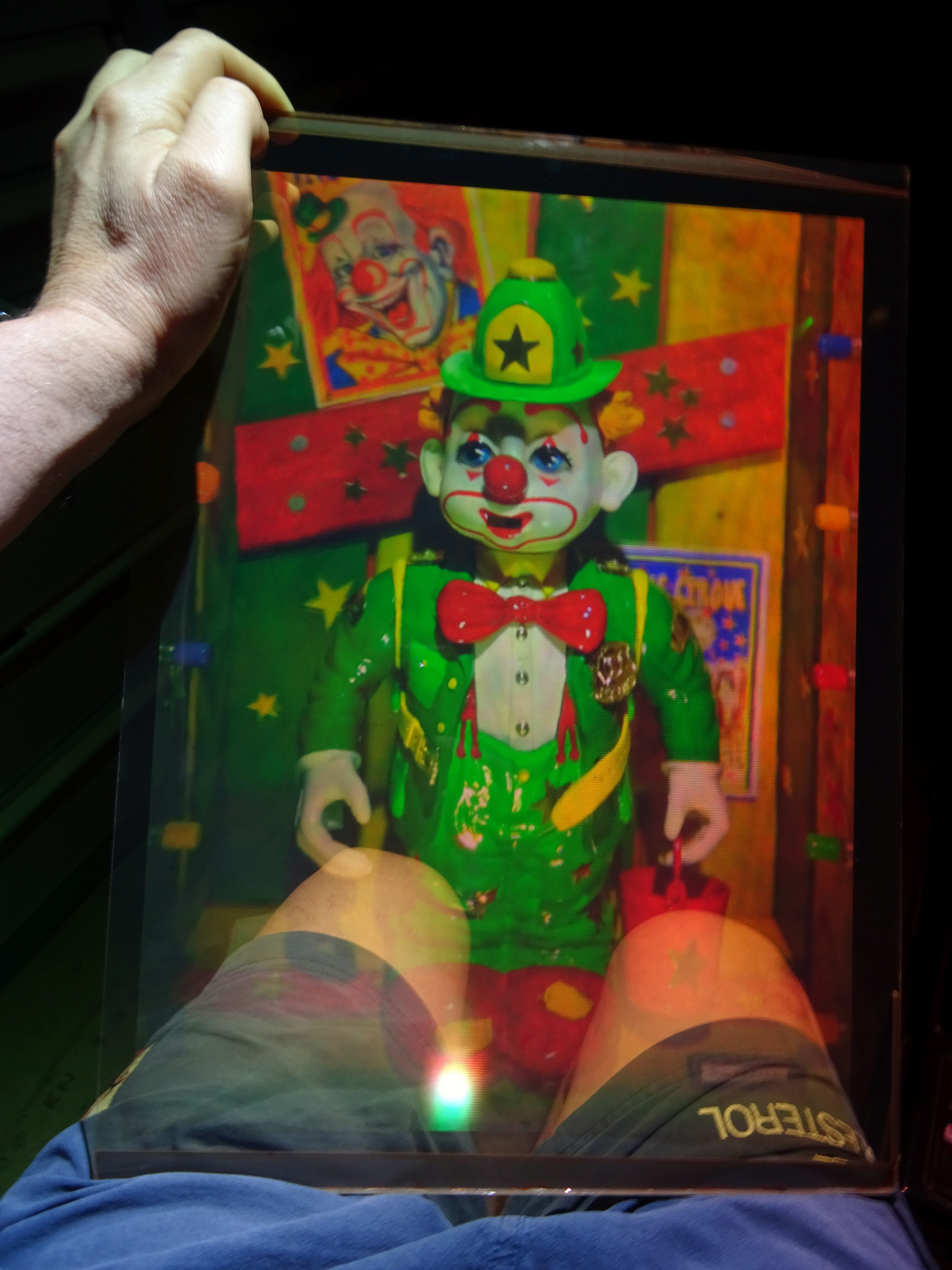
CHIMERA holographic print from a 3D scan on ULTIMATE material by Yves GENTET

His work is self-financed as an inventor by selling technical holographic elements or artistic creations to individuals or companies. His holographic material is currently used by 450 universities, companies or amateurs worldwide and his new 3D printer is on marketing development.

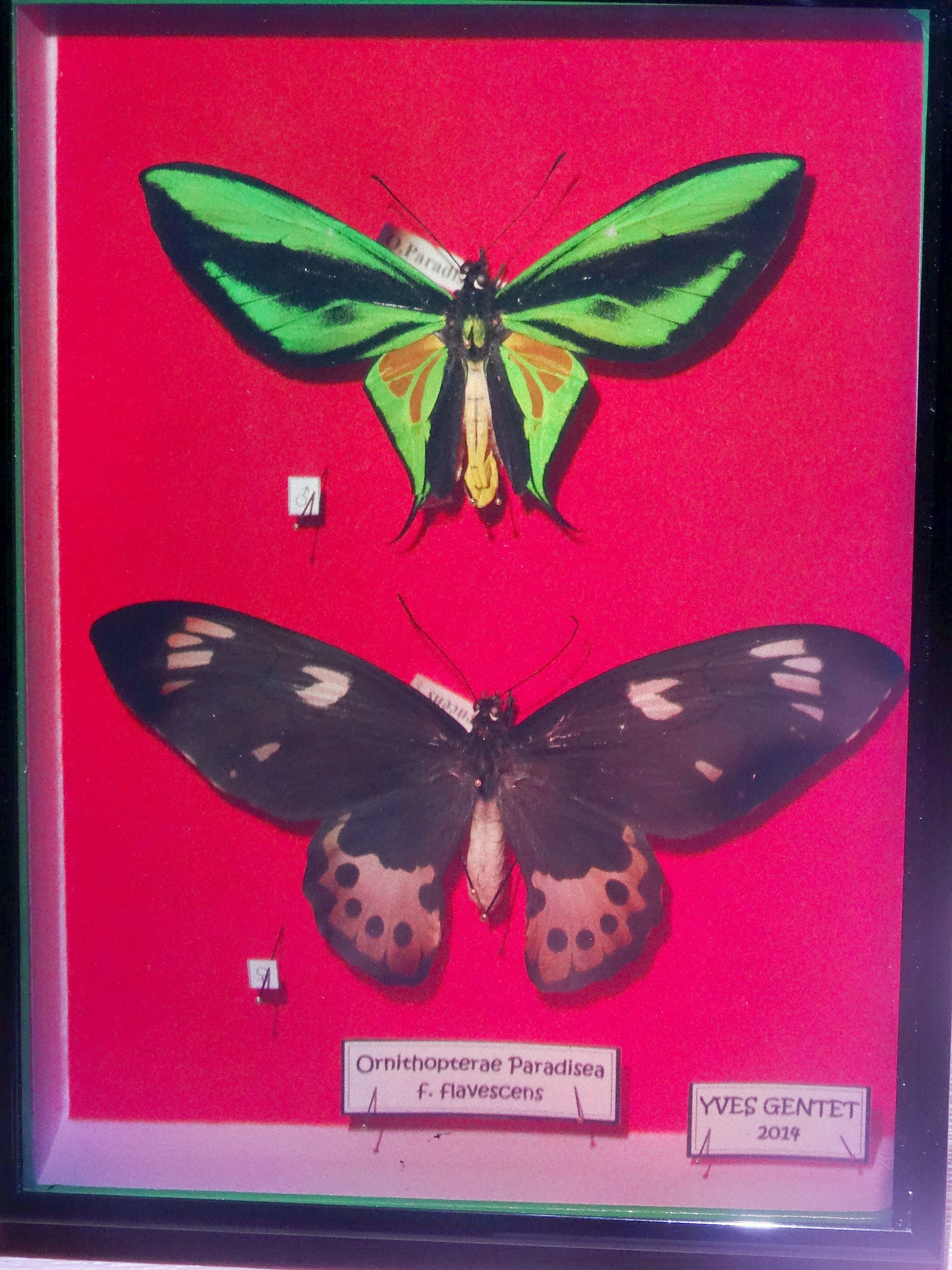
Hologram of butterflies by Yves Gentet

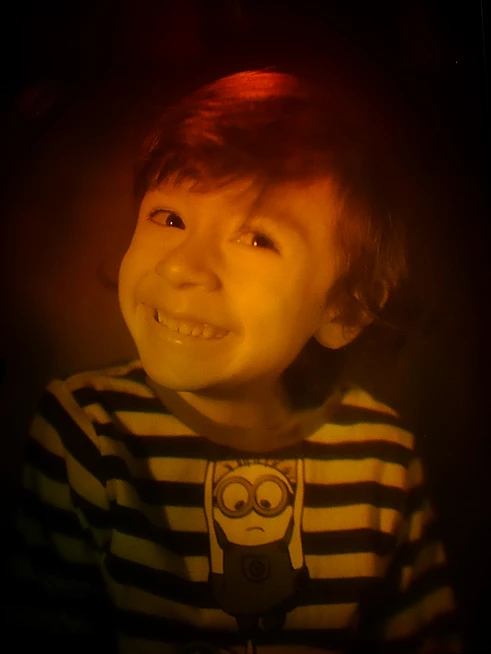
Marc, Portrait recorded on Holomaton system by Yves Gentet

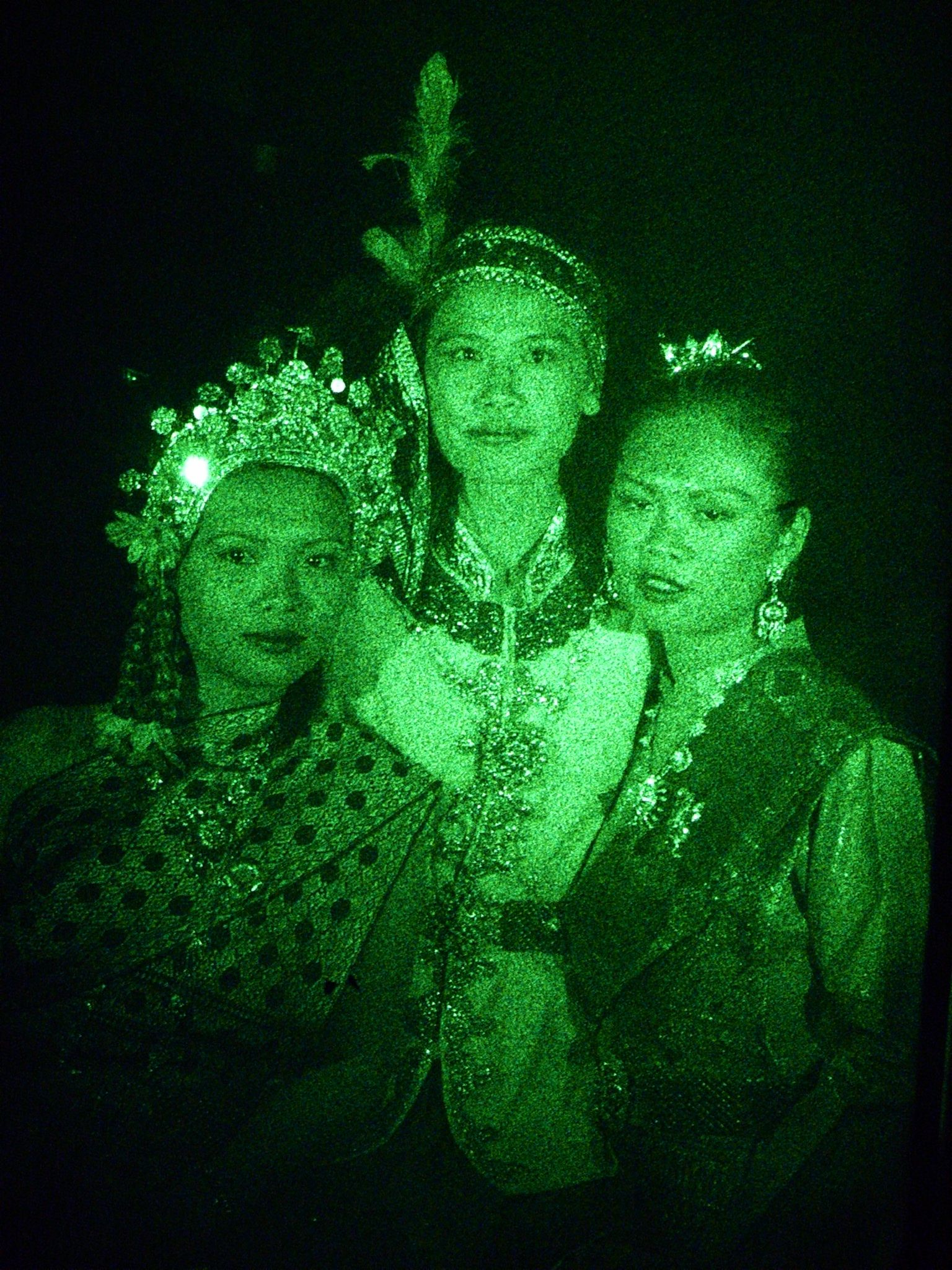
Holographic portraitrure recorded with Holomaton. "The 3 lao sisters" by Yves Gentet

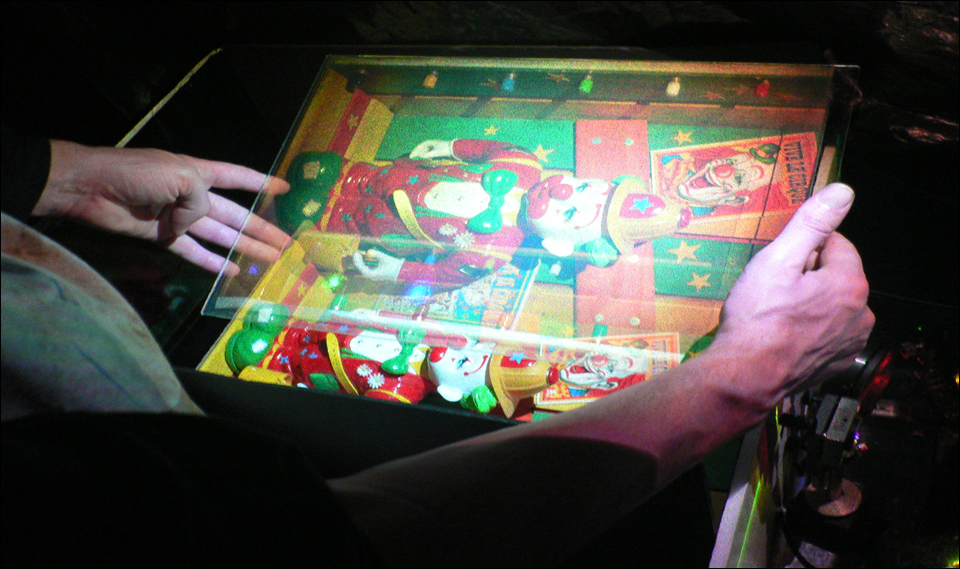
Direct color recording of an object on ULTIMATE holographic plate

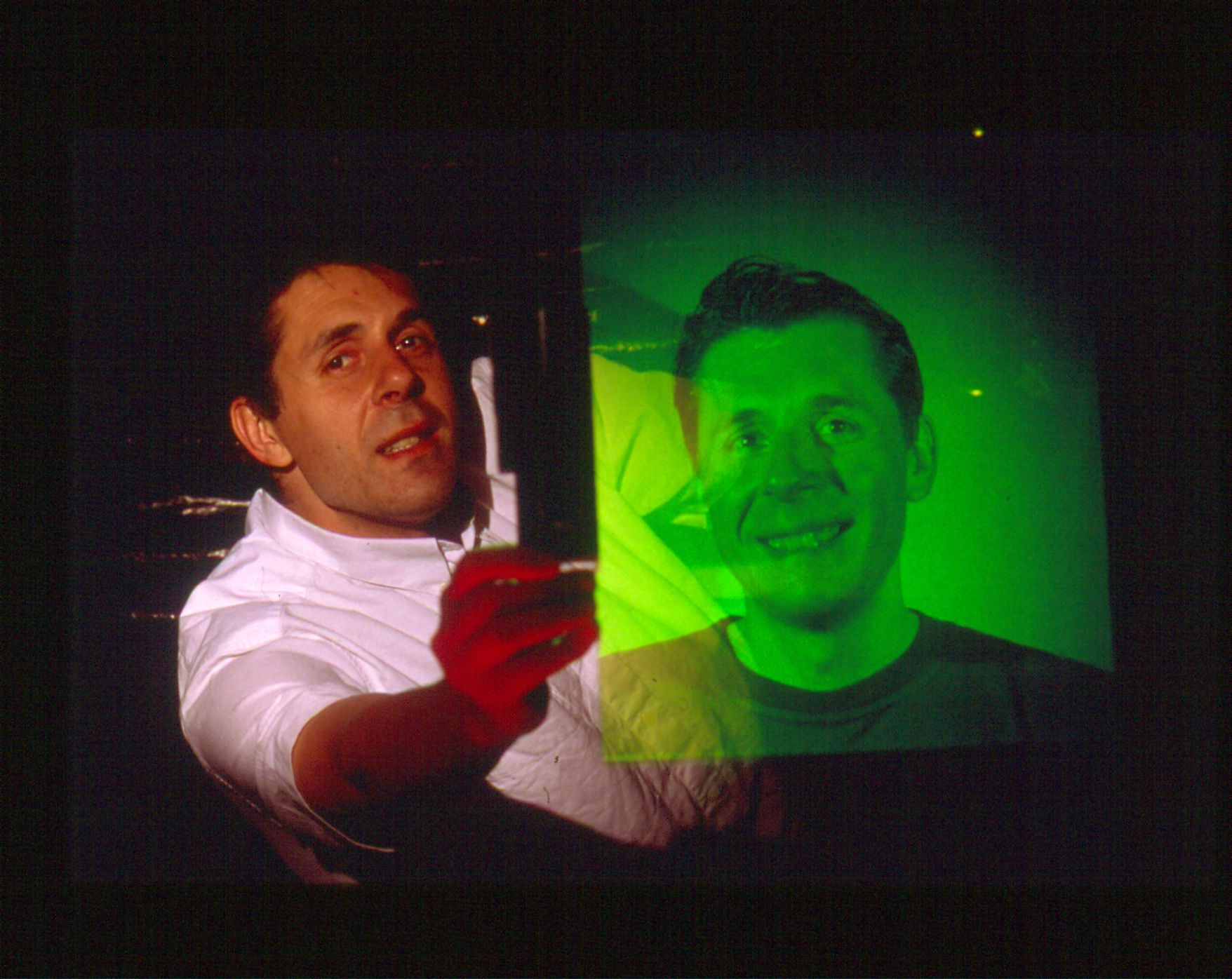
Yves Gentet and his holographic autoportrait in his laboratory

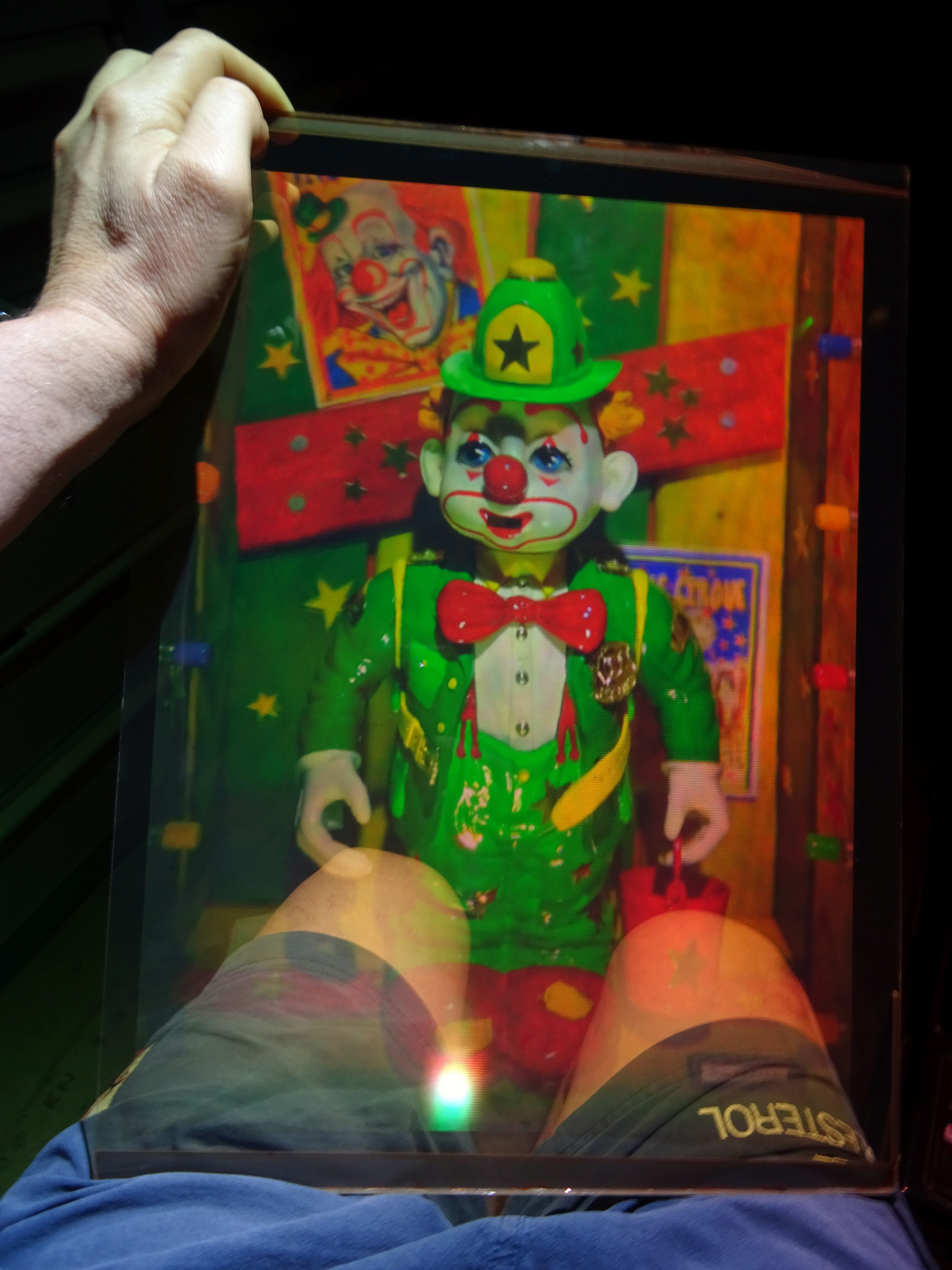
CHIMERA holographic print from a 3D scan on ULTIMATE material by Yves GENTET

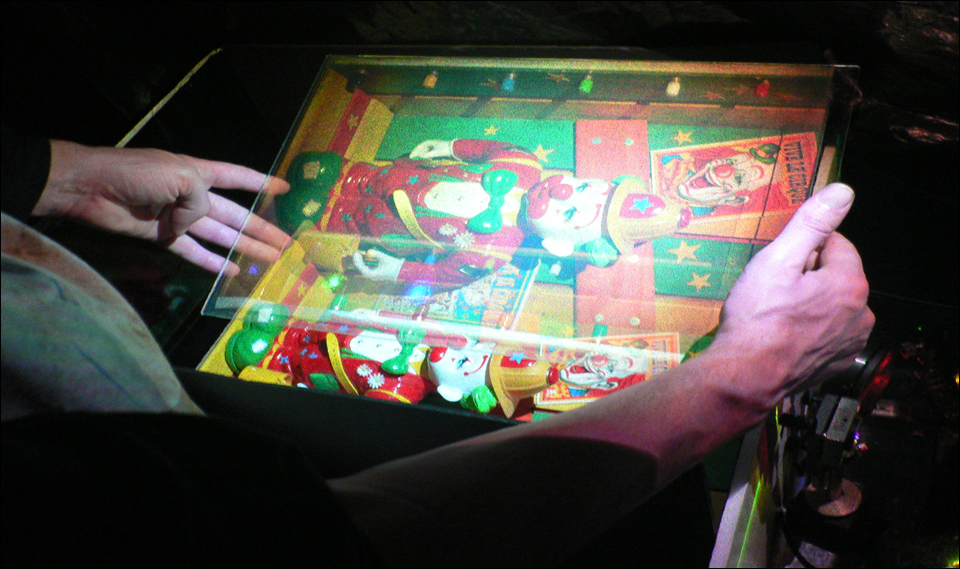
Direct color recording of an object on ULTIMATE holographic plate

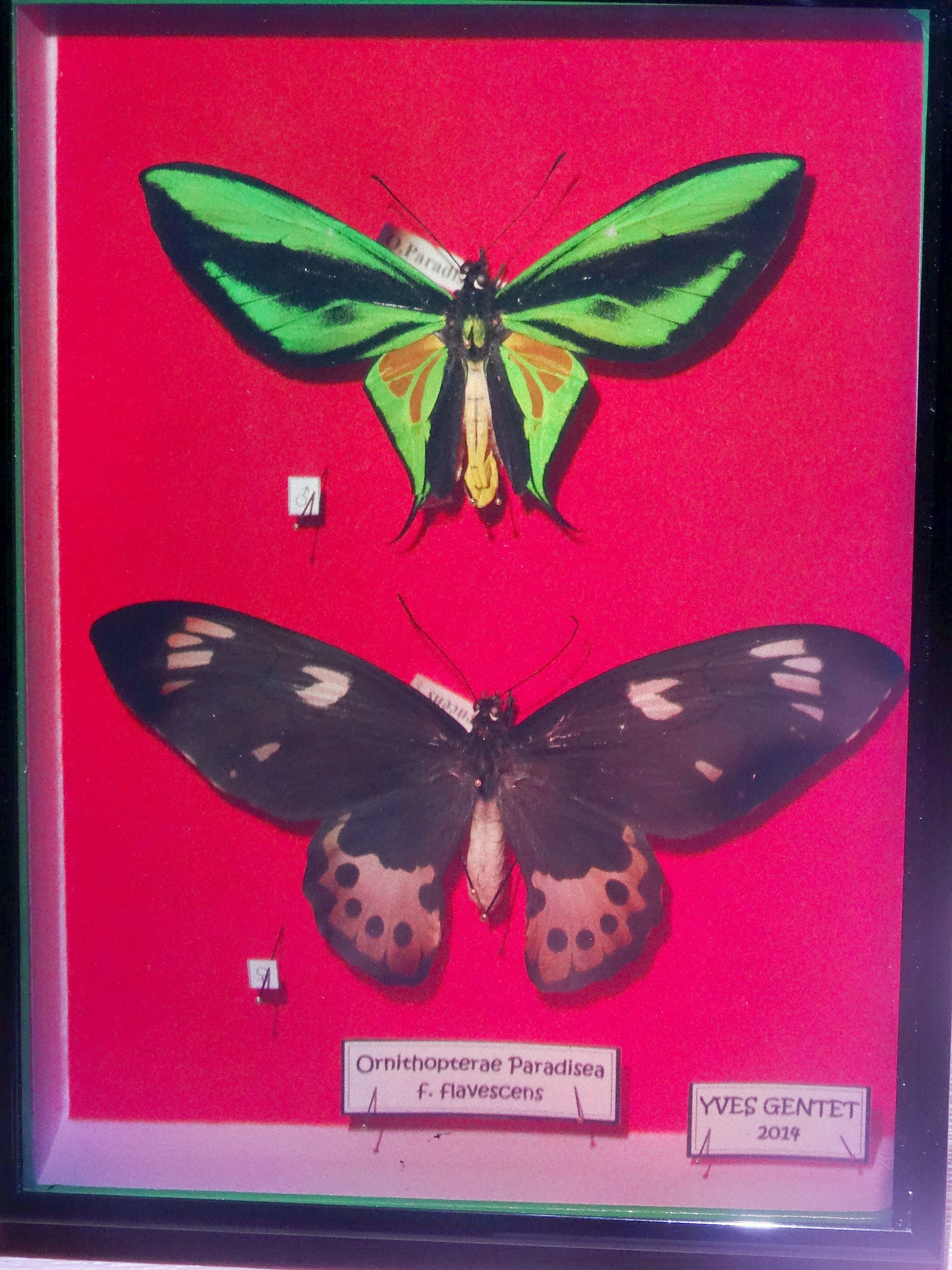
Hologram of butterflies by Yves Gentet

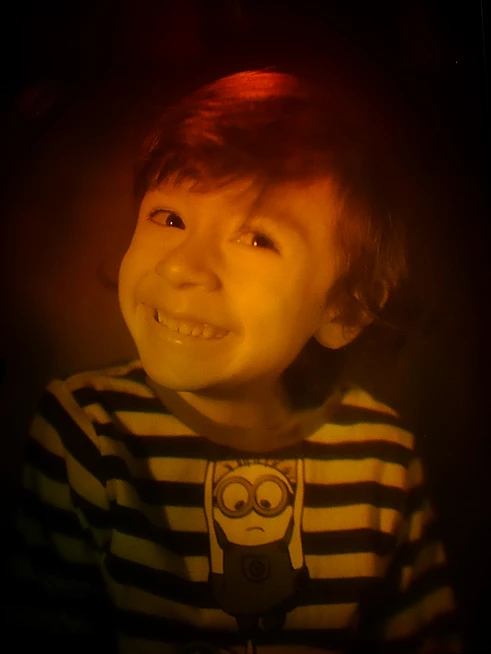
"Marc", Hologram Portrait recorded with Holomaton system by Yves Gentet

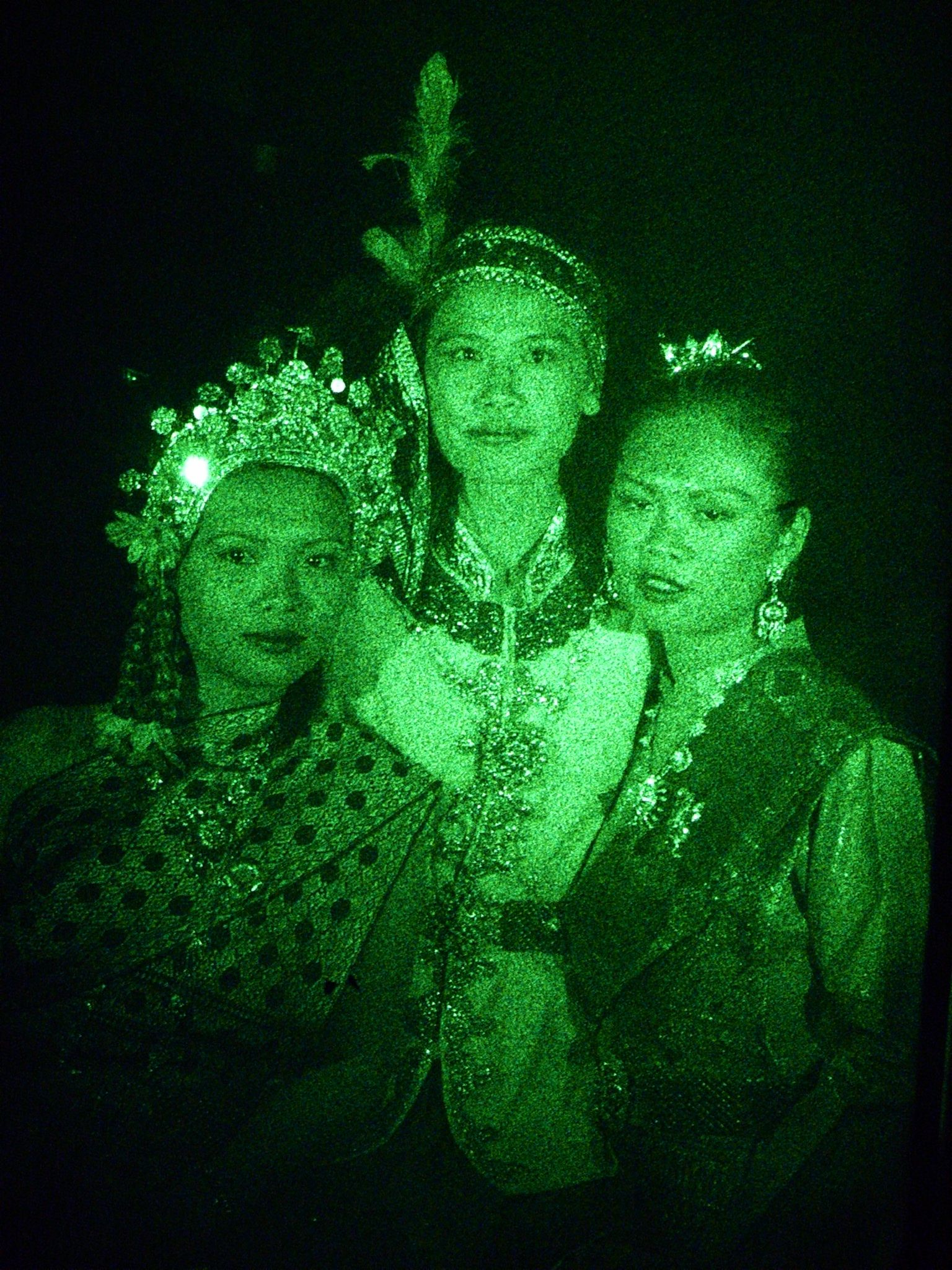
"The 3 lao sisters" Hologram portrait recorded with Holomaton. by Yves Gentet
