= Modeste Testas =

Enslaved African woman (1765–1870)

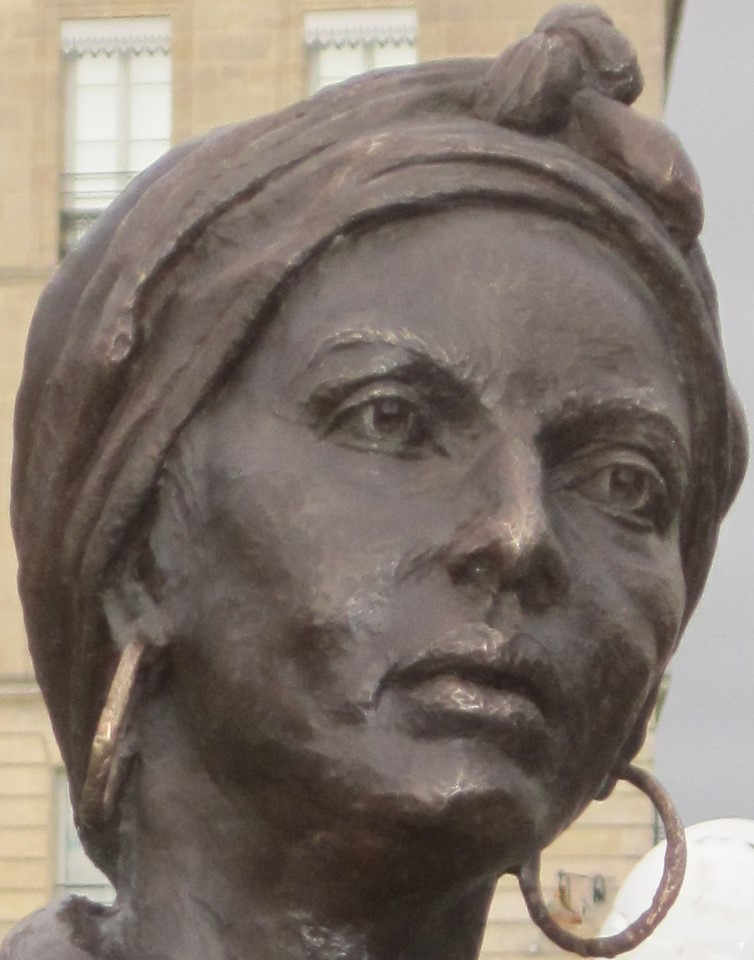
- Born: Al Pouessi; 1765; Ethiopia
- Died: 1870 (aged 105); Haiti
- Other name: Marthe Adélaïde Modeste Testas

Al Pouessi, baptized Marthe Adélaïde Modeste Testas and known under the name of Modeste Testas (1765 – 1870) was an Ethiopian woman who was enslaved, purchased by Bordeaux merchants and subsequently freed after living on three continents. One of her grandsons is a former president of Haiti, François Denys Légitime.

== Biography ==
Testas was born with the name Al Pouessi, and was originally from Ethiopia in East Africa. She was captured in a raid at the age of fourteen, following a dispute with another tribe. She was taken to West Africa from where she was sold. She was purchased between 1778 and 1781 by Pierre and François Testas, who were merchants and slave-traders from Bordeaux, and owners of a sugar plantation on the island of Haiti.

She travelled to Bordeaux, where she was baptized by the Testas brothers in 1781, giving her the name Marthe Adelaïde Modeste Testas. The same year, she was transported with François Testas to their plantation in Haiti. As an enslaved person, Testas could not consent to a relationship or sex and the circumstances under which she had two children with her owner are not known.

In 1795, François Testas left Haiti for New York, travelling with his enslaved servants, who included Modeste Testas and Joseph Lespérance. After moving to Baltimore, François died in Philadelphia. However, in his will he freed the slaves he owned. For Testas, however, one of the conditions of her emancipation was that she would marry Lespérance. The couple returned to Haiti, where Testas inherited fifty-one tiles of land. She and Lespérance had a number of children.

In 1870, Testas died on the Testas estate, located near to Jérémie, at the age of 105.

== Legacy ==
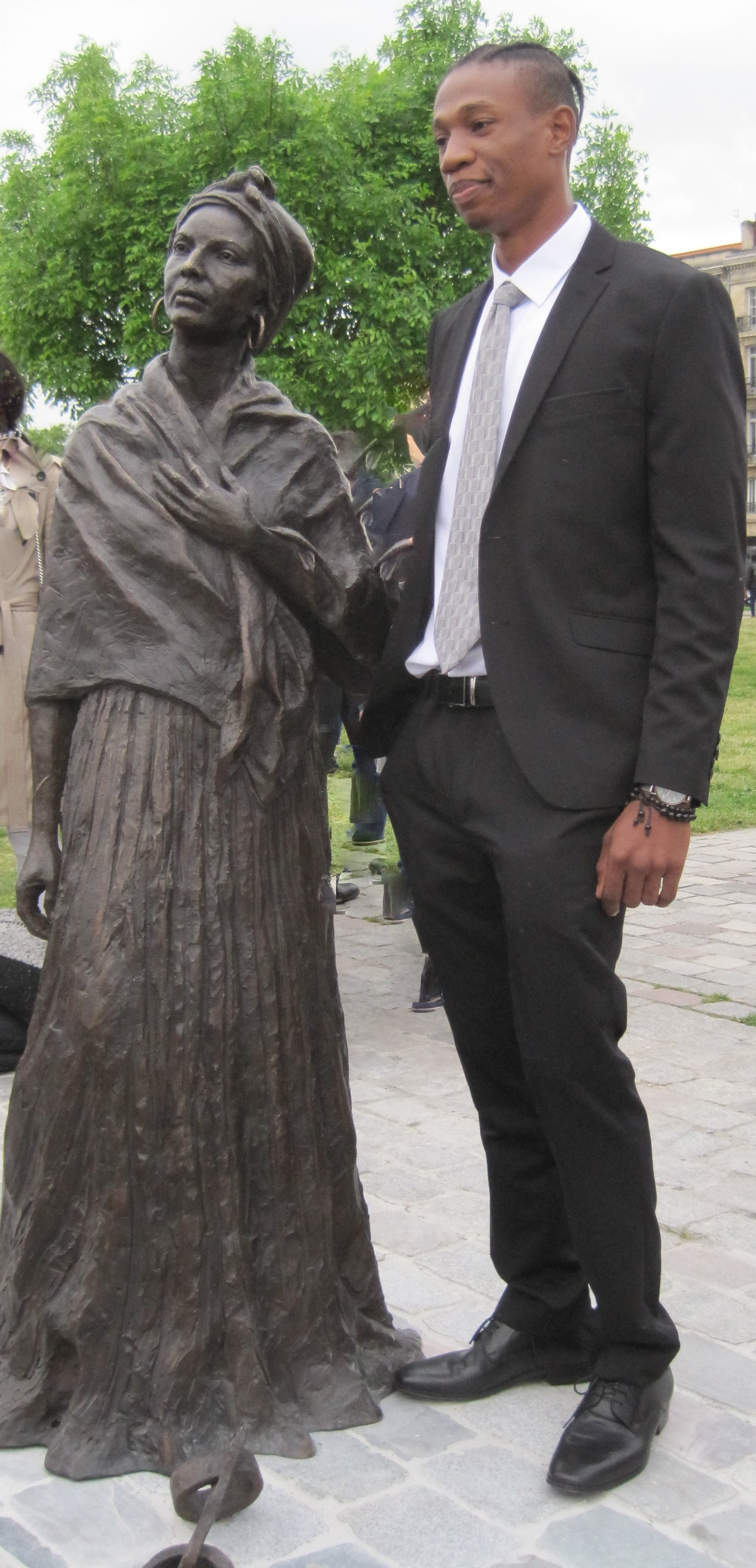
Modeste Testas alongside her sculptor, Woodly Caymitte

One of Testas' grandsons, François Denys Légitime, who was the son of Tinette Lespérance, became President of the Republic of Haiti from 1888 to 1889.

On 10 May 2019, a statue of Testas was unveiled in Bordeaux, which was created by the Haitian sculptor Woodly Caymitte. The bronze statue is 1.7m high and was made at the Fonderie des Cyclopes, and is located on the banks of the Garonne, Quai Louis XVIII. It is a figurative sculpture and is notable as a representation of the body of an enslaved woman. An explanatory plaque on the ground evokes the story of Modeste Testas. The choice to represent slavery solely through a freedwoman is criticized by activist Karfa Diallo, who argues that the sculpture does not sufficiently depict the struggles of slavery.

On 13 September 2021, the statue was vandalized with white paint.

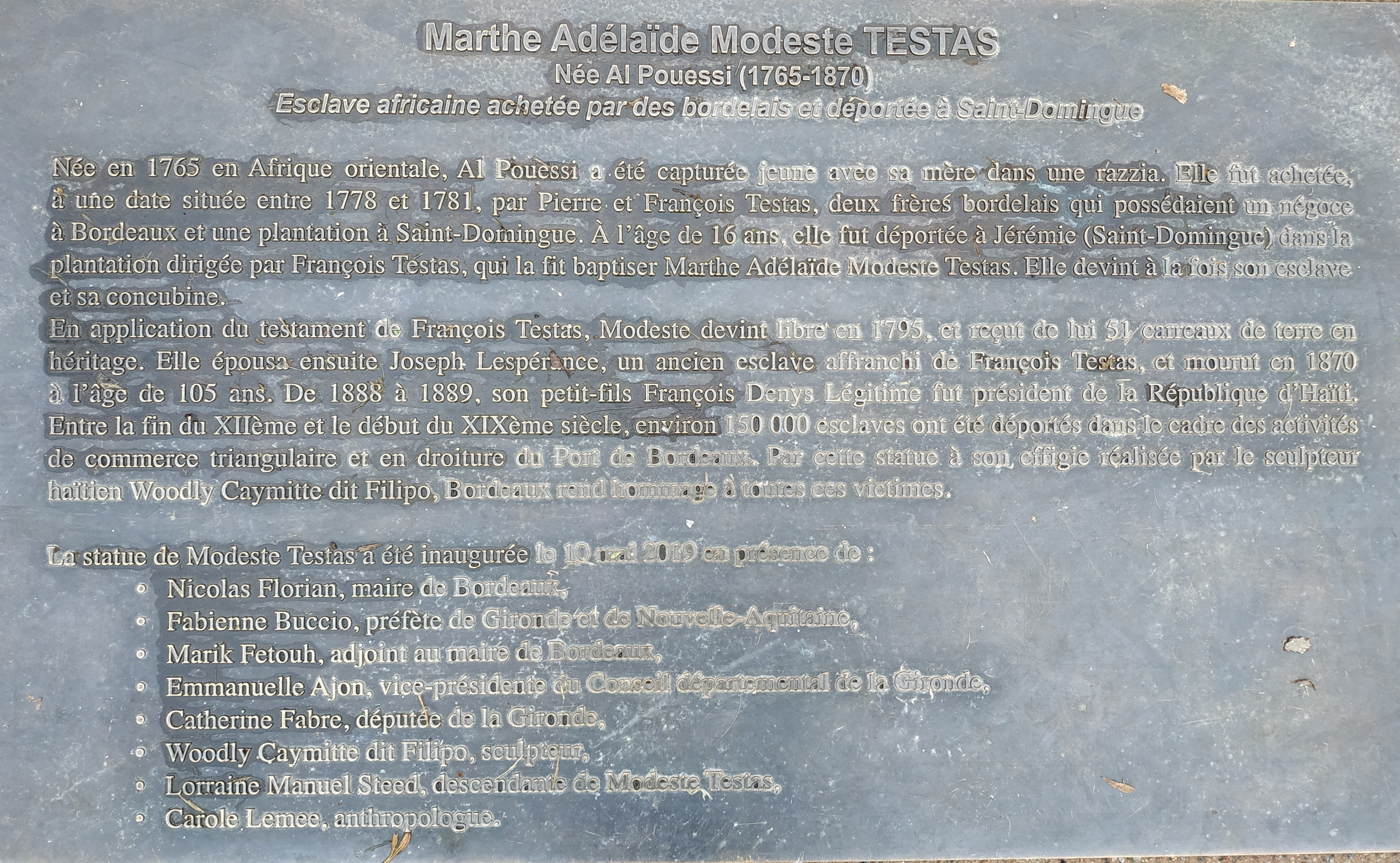
Modeste Testas statue plaque

== See also ==
- Slavery in Africa
