= Karfa Diallo =

Franco-Senegalese activist and writer (born 1971)

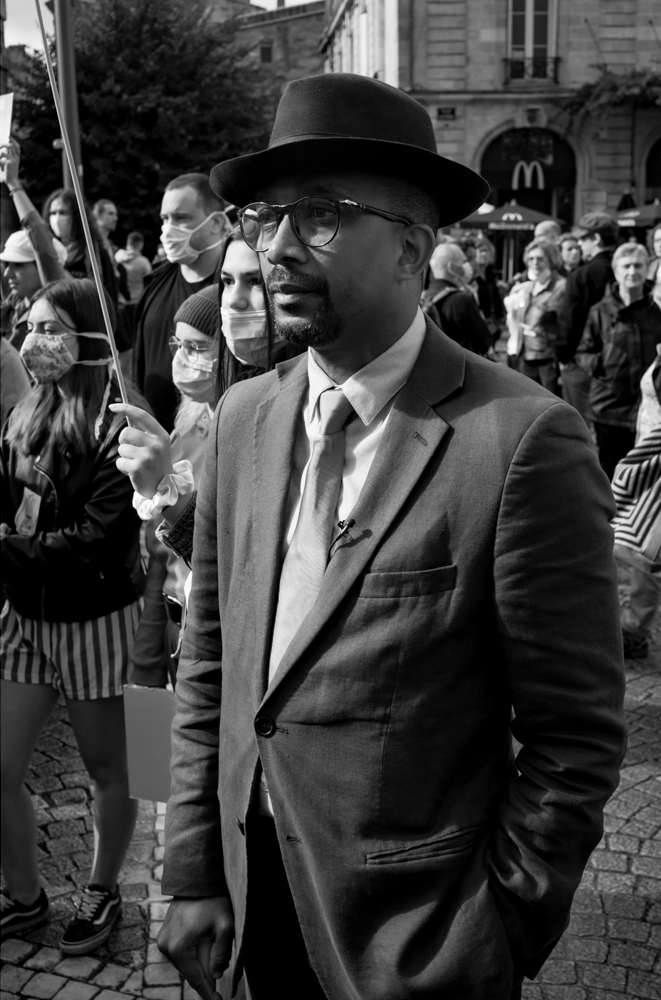
- Diallo in the George Floyd protests in Bordeaux, 2020
- Born: Karfa Sira Diallo; March 16, 1971 (age 55); Thiaroye, Senegal
- Education: Cheikh Anta Diop University; Institut d'études politiques de Bordeaux
- Occupations: Activist, writer
- Years active: 1998—present

Karfa Diallo (born March 16, 1971) is a Franco-Senegalese activist and writer. He has led the movement to recognize the slave trade past of the city of Bordeaux, among other French cities. In 2019, at the request of former French Prime Minister Jean-Marc Ayrault, he joined the steering committee of the Foundation for the Remembrance of Slavery.

== Early life and education ==
Diallo was born in 1971, in Thiaroye, a suburb of Dakar (Senegal). He is the son of Abdoulaye Diallo, a French tirailleur of the Algerian War, of Fulani and Kabyle descent, who later became a nurse in the Senegalese army; and Soukeyna Doucouré, a Jola from Casamance. Diallo is the eldest of a family that would include twenty-five children. As a teenager, he rejected his father's authoritarian conservatism and was influenced by communist theory. His activism began in secondary school, with student unionism. He studied at the Lycée Seydina-Limamou-Laye in Pikine, Cheikh Anta Diop University in Dakar, and Institut d'études politiques de Bordeaux.

After his first professional experience at Ford in Blanquefort, Diallo then worked for about ten years as a legal advisor for Sida Info Service (French association for information on sexually transmitted infection).

== Career ==
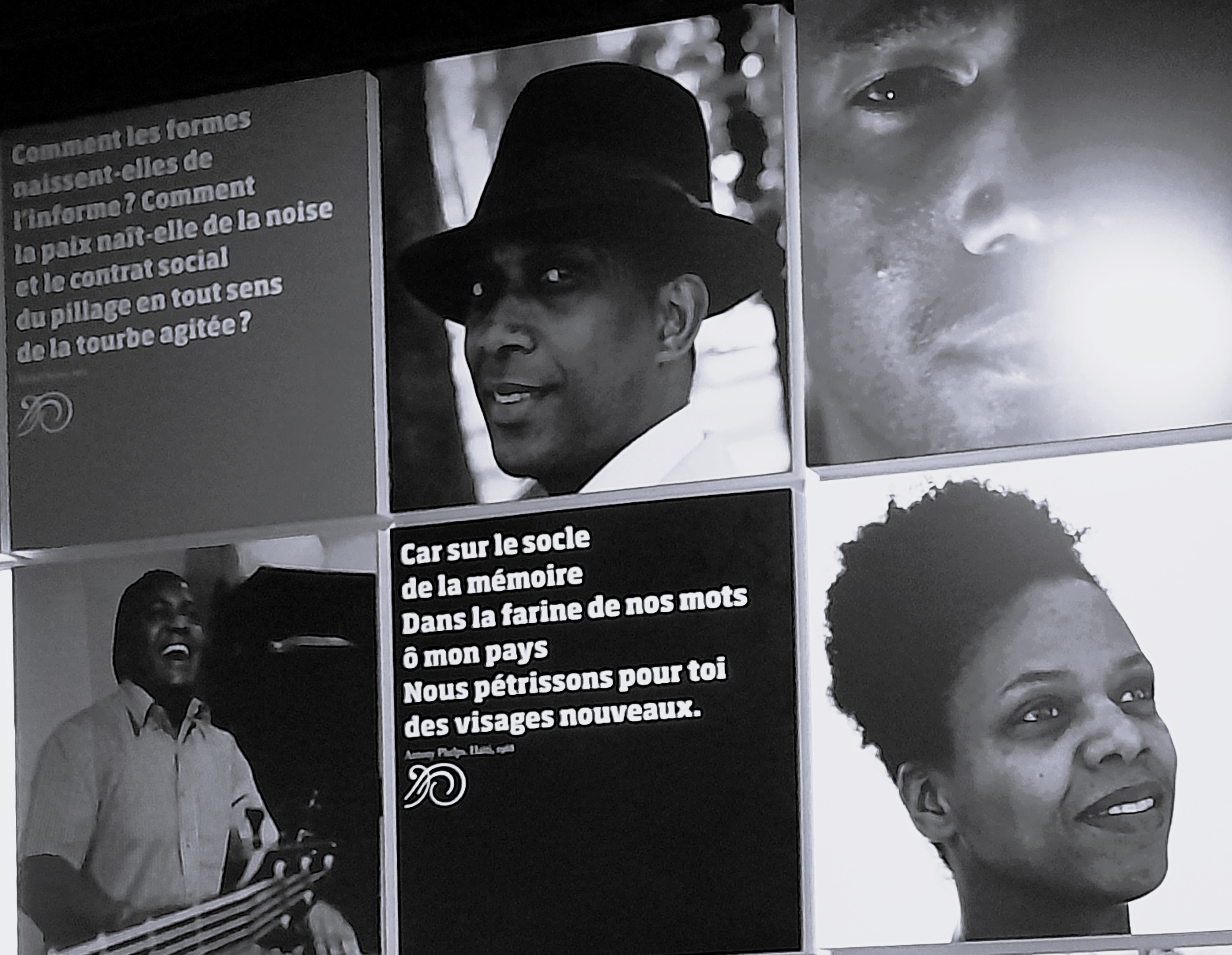
Musée d'Aquitaine: gallery of portraits of Afro-descendants from Bordeaux. At the top, in the center, portrait of Karfa Diallo

In 1998, in Bordeaux, Karfa Diallo founded his first association, DiversCités, which worked in particular to recognize the slave-trading past of the city. Thanks to pressure exerted by Karfa Diallo's association, the municipality of Bordeaux, then led by Hugues Martin, installed a commemorative plaque on the quays, and entrusted the Musée d'Aquitaine with the opening of four permanent rooms dedicated to the Bordeaux history of Atlantic trade and colonial slavery. In 2019, when the city unveil the Woodly Caymitte's sculpture of Modeste Testas, Diallo criticised it, saying one who was freed cannot represent the struggles of slavery.

In 2010, Diallo succeeded in getting Senegal to pass the first African act recognizing the slave trade and slavery as a crime against humanity. However, shortly afterwards, he experienced a period of doubt and expressed a sense of powerlessness. It was at this time that he published his first essay, Matins noirs (Black Mornings), presented as a long poem.

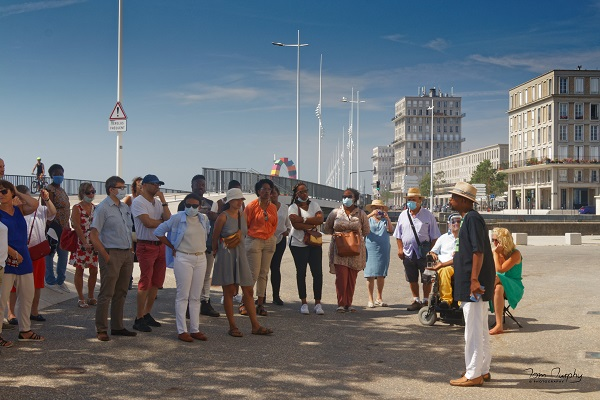
Diallo leading a guided tour in Le Havre in 2020

The following year, Diallo regained the energy to resume his activism. He then launched the guided tour Le Bordeaux nègre (The Negro Bordeaux), which he began offering to the public in 2012. Afterwards, he developed memorial trails in La Rochelle, Le Havre, and Paris.

In 2013, the foundation changed its name to the international association Mémoires & Partages. In 2020, branches were established in two other slave-trading ports: Le Havre and La Rochelle. In 2021, the cities of Bayonne and Paris also opened branches. Finally, in 2025, a branch was established in Poitiers.

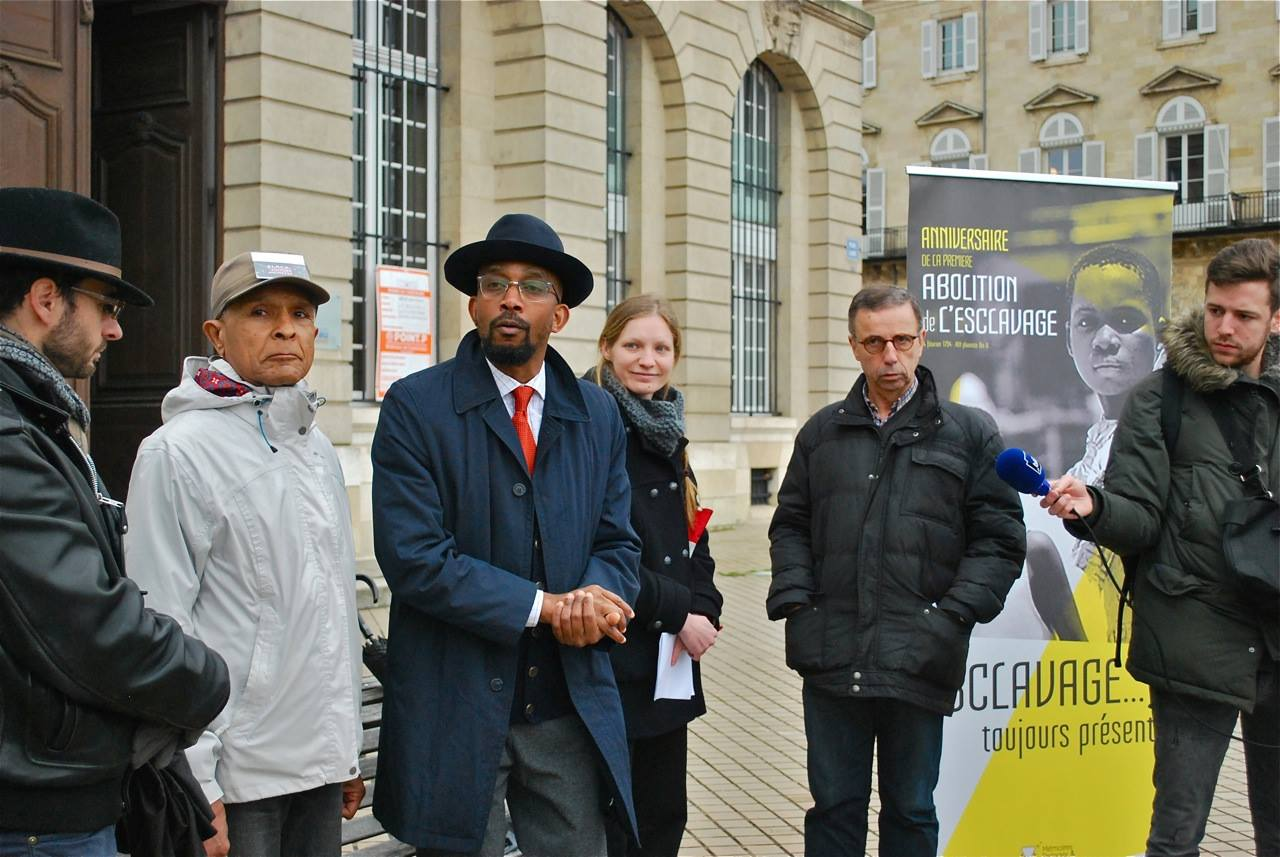
Diallo in a demonstration regarding Bordeaux street names, 2018

Since the late 2000s, Karfa Diallo and his association have been campaigning to rename or explain streets bearing the names of enslavers (traders or owners) in the five main French slave ports: Nantes, La Rochelle, Le Havre, Bordeaux and Marseille. He finally succeeded in having plaques installed in some streets of the first four cities. In a retrospective, Diallo regretted that the selected streets only bore the names of slave ship owners. He hoped that city councils would go further by also including streets named after other enslavers, such as planters and administrators. In May 2022, Rue Colbert in Bordeaux added to the initial streets. Karfa Diallo and his association also succeeded, after a long legal battle, in having the name of the La Négresse district (District of the "Negger Woman") in Biarritz officially removed.

Through his association, Diallo also engages in a calm dialogue with descendants of slave traders.

In February 2018, he initiated the organization of the first Black History Month in France, held in Bordeaux, to highlight the cultural contributions of people of African descent to local and global history. A second edition took place in 2019, which spread to several sites in Aquitaine. The event was further expanded in subsequent years.

Karfa Diallo has made several attempts at politics. In 2001, he ran for mayor of Bordeaux and obtained more than 4% of the vote with his list "Couleurs bordelaises" (Bordeaux Colors). Then, in 2023, he was elected regional councillor for Nouvelle-Aquitaine on The Ecologists list. He is the only Black member of the assembly.

== Works ==
=== Essays ===
- 2008 - Triangle doré. Éditions DiversCités, Bordeaux.
- 2010 - Matins noirs, essai poétique pour une nouvelle négritude. Éditions Ex Æquo, Collection Hors cadre, Châlons-en-Champagne.
- 2015 - Sénégal – France, mémoires d’alternances inquiètes. L’Harmattan. Collection Points de vue. Paris.
- 2017 - Les légions de Senghor, recueil de poèmes. Éditions Ex Æquo, Collection A l'En-vers, Plombières-les-Bains.
- 2023 - Maison Esclavages & Résistances : document. Éditions Zola Ntondo.

=== Documentary exhibitions ===
- 2013 - Aimé Césaire, j'ai apporté une parole d'homme, à l'occasion du centenaire de sa naissance.
- 2014 - Frères d’âme, héritages croisés de la Première Guerre mondiale (label Mission du Centenaire 14-18).
- 2015 - Bord'Africa, les descendants, sur les afro-descendants à Bordeaux.
- 2016 - Triangle doré, une histoire de l'esclavage.
- 2017 - Senghor, l'Africain universel.
- 2018 - Le Mémorial des Tirailleurs naufragés, autour du naufrage de navire l'Afrique (label Mission du Centenaire 14-18).
- 2018 - On a tous en nous quelque chose de Madiba, à l'occasion du centenaire de la naissance de Nelson Mandela.
- 2023 - Afrodescendant.e.s du Bordeaux Colonial.
- 2023 - Madinina, la Martinique face à l'esclavage colonial.

== See also ==
- Decolonization of public space
- Négritude
- Anti-racism
