= Woodly Caymitte =

Haitian sculptor (born 1974)

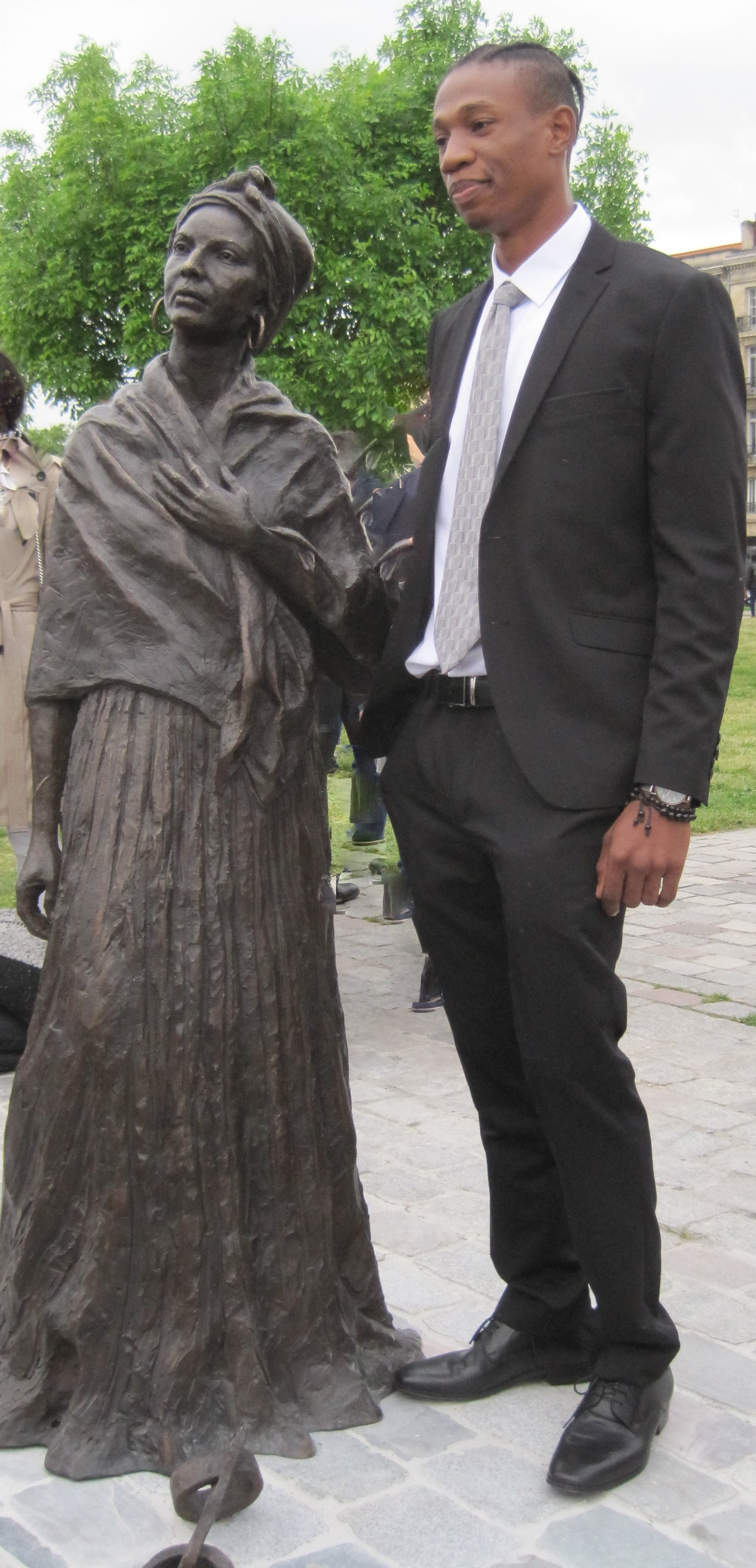
- Caymitte standing with his sculpture of Modeste Testas, 2019
- Born: 1974 (age 51–52); Port-au-Prince, Haiti
- Known for: Sculpting

Woodly "Filipo" Caymitte (born 1974) is a Haitian sculptor whose works center around the historical struggles of black people.

Caymitte was born in 1974 in Port-au-Prince. From 2011 to 2015, he studied at the École Nationale des Arts in Haiti, later working as a professor of sculpture at the school.

On May 10, 2019, Caymitte unveiled a 1.7-meter-tall bronze statue of Modeste Testas, in Bordeaux. The statue was created to acknowledge the time in history. Karfa Diallo criticized the statue, saying that a freed person cannot represent the struggles of slavery. On 13 September 2021, the statue was vandalized with white paint.

On May 31, 2020, Caymitte created a bust of George Floyd following his murder, six days after the event.

On May 10, 2024, Caymitte unveiled a bronze statue titled "Clarisse, nurse slave" in La Rochelle. Prime Minister Gabriel Attal attended the ceremony. The statue features an enslaved woman breastfeeding a white child.
