= Bust of Pope Gregory XV =

Sculpture by Gianlorenzo Bernini

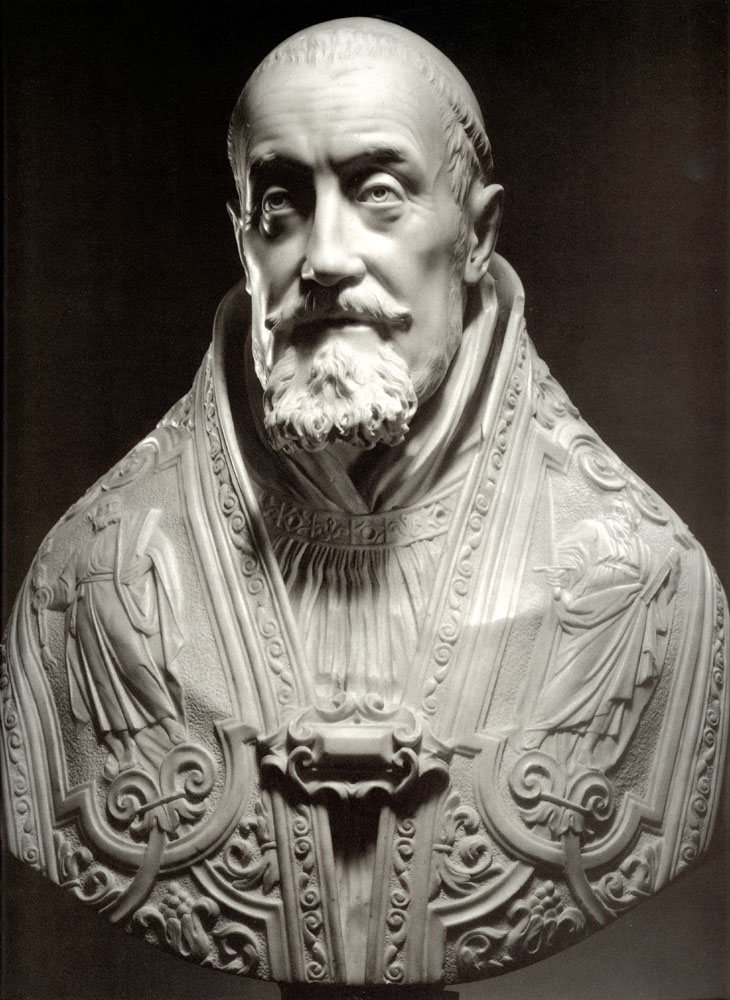
- Artist: Gian Lorenzo Bernini
- Year: 1621
- Catalogue: 12
- Type: Sculpture
- Medium: Marble
- Subject: Pope Gregory XV
- Dimensions: 64 cm (25 in)
- Location: Art Gallery of Ontario; Toronto
- Preceded by: Sleeping Hermaphroditus
- Followed by: Bust of Monsignor Pedro de Foix Montoya

The Bust of Pope Gregory XV is a marble portrait sculpture by the Italian artist Gian Lorenzo Bernini. Executed in 1621, the work is one of three busts of the subject created by Bernini—the other two were bronze casts. The marble bust is on permanent display at the Art Gallery of Ontario, in Toronto. It was donated to the museum by Joey and Toby Tanenbaum.

== Background ==
Bernini began work on the marble bust immediately after the election of Pope Gregory XV in February 1621, and completed the work in September of that year. Two bronze casts were also made during this time. He was able to achieve this by reusing the pattern and arrangement of the cope, amice, and alb he had created for the Bust of Pope Paul V in 1618. For this work, he made only a few minor changes to the flanking images of Saint Peter and Saint Paul, and modified the details of the morse or clasp of the cope. As a result, the sculpted busts of the two pontiffs closely resemble each other. In both, Bernini nestled the head low into the cope collar creating a triangular silhouette.

Bernini was well rewarded for his efforts in creating the Bust of Pope Gregory XV. On 30 June 1621, at the age of twenty-two, Bernini was awarded a papal knighthood by the pope—the Supreme Order of Christ—and an accompanying lifetime salary. In 1622, Ottavio Leoni's engraving of the sculptor's portrait was published showing him wearing the special cross of the order. Thereafter, Bernini was commonly referred to as Il Cavaliere (the Knight). Bernini was also honoured at this time by being elected the principal of the Accademia di San Luca, the artists' society in Rome, after being a member for only three years. Along with the great mythological statues he executed in the Villa Borghese, these honours marked the summation of his early success.

== Description ==
The Bust of Pope Gregory XV depicts a sickly, though mentally alert, sixty-seven-year-old man presented in the majestic role of pope, the head of the Catholic Church and a powerful force in international affairs. Bernini used the cope—with its gold threads, stiff formal embroidery, and jewelled morse—to convey the power and wealth of the Church. The flanking panels depicting Saint Peter and Saint Paul show the pope's saintly protectors and reinforce the office of the sitter. Bernini shows the thickness of the fabric and the rigidity of the embroidery by the "abrupt bends with which it conforms to the curve of the pope's shoulders".

The pope's head is bowed as if weighed down by his cope, symbolic of the weight and responsibility of his office, and perhaps his age. His eyes are raised, creating soft wrinkles across his forehead; his gaze is steady and far-reaching, focused beyond the viewer toward eternity. The pope's skin is smooth and polished, reflecting the natural pallor of the man's complexion as observed by his contemporaries. The smoothness of his skin is offset by the "crisp, dry carving of the myriad tufts of hair" around his tonsured head and along his cheeks and jowls. Bernini converges these lines at the pope's curly mustache and beard, which seem to "burst forth almost luxuriantly" in light and shade and depth—all created by Bernini's favorite sculpting tool, the drill.

== Technique ==
Bernini's approach to portraiture was unique in several respects. Unlike other artists of his time that relied primarily on subject sittings—an approach that often produced stiff and overly-formal results—Bernini preferred to observe his subjects in their daily work and activities over a period of time, making numerous sketches that captured their features, characteristic poses, and natural expressions. He used these sketches to build preliminary models using moist clay. Using those models, Bernini would then begin the marble portrait of the subject. It was only toward the end of this process of carving the marble portrait that he would bring in the subject for formal sittings. This approach also accommodated the time constraints of his preoccupied clientele.

Bernini's approach to working with white marble was also innovative. He once observed that the very material itself produces a pallor that distorts the natural visage, similar to the effect of a person fainting. Bernini's technique of offsetting this pallor was to produce "effects of colour" using numerous tricks, exaggerations, and distortions, such as drilling more deeply in certain places to create "accents of shadows" and presenting the figure in such a way as to catch the light. This approach is evident in his Bust of Pope Gregory XV, with his creation of shadows around the eyes, the sinuses, the wrinkles at the corners of the eyes, and even the pupils themselves.

Bernini once noted, "Mere resemblance is not sufficient. One must express what goes on in the heads of heroes." No doubt the artist viewed his subject, the leader of the Catholic Church, as an heroic figure. The result of Bernini's efforts was impressive, as one writer observed:

The young sculptor succeeded in giving an admirable impression of the character and mood; the dignity and uprightness of the law-giver is combined with the personal humility and sensitivity of the priest. The physical weakness of the flesh is contrasted with the spiritual resolve of a reforming pope.

== Bronze models ==
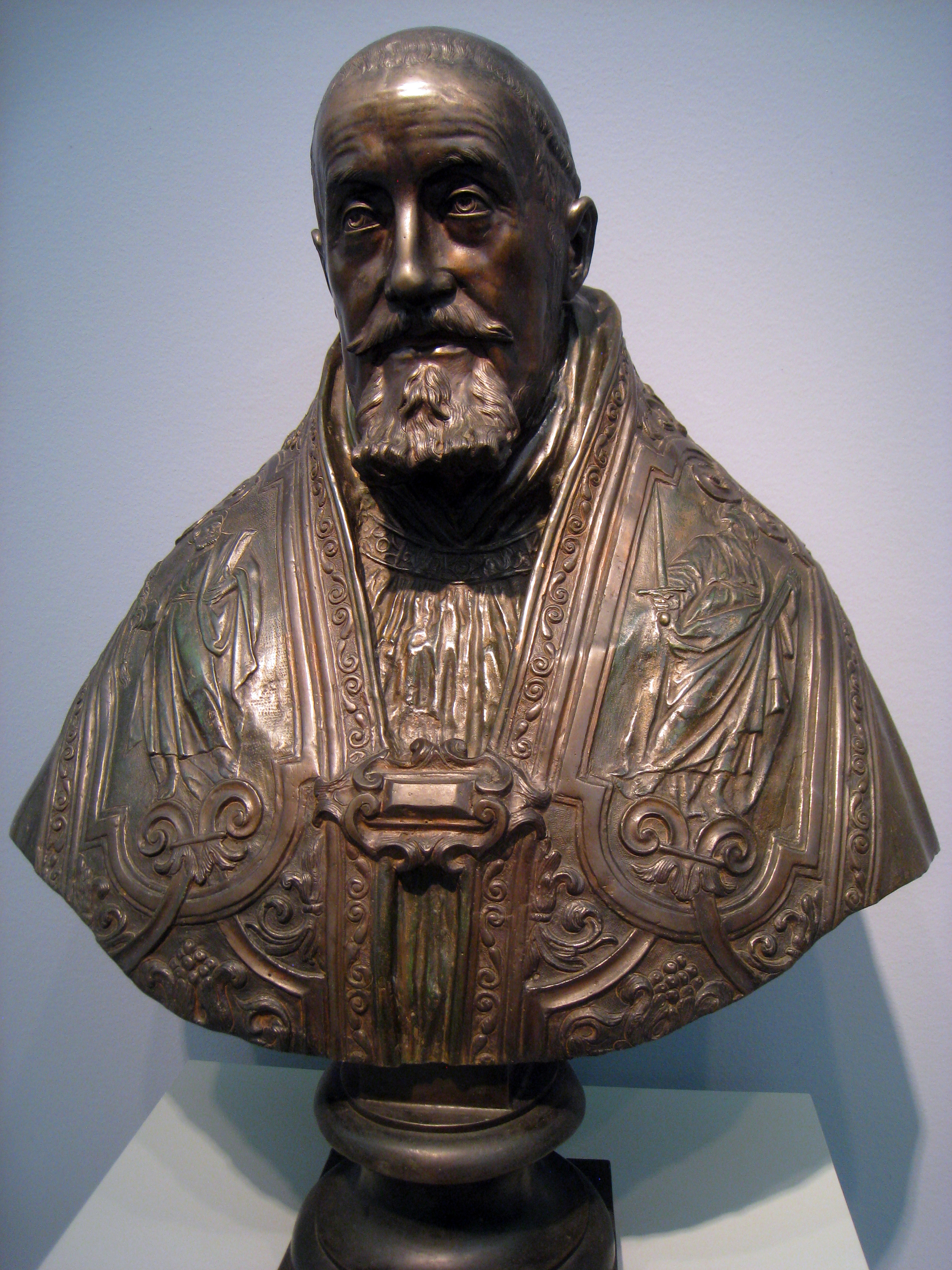
Bust of Pope Gregory XV (bronze), Carnegie Museum of Art, Pittsburgh, Pennsylvania, USA

While he worked on the marble bust, Bernini also created two identical bronze casts of the bust. These are currently on display in the Musée Jacquemart-André in Paris, France, and in the Carnegie Museum of Art in Pittsburgh, Pennsylvania, USA. It is generally believed that the two bronze busts were created as replicas, but recent studies seem to show that the bronze bust in Paris was a first specimen, chiselled by Bernini, and destined for a leading Roman collector.

== Provenance ==
The bust was only rediscovered as an authentic work by Bernini in the 1980s. It had been in the hands of an English nobleman, and then an antiques dealer, before being recognised as a Bernini by Nicholas Meinertzhagen, a dealer in antiquarian books. Meinertzhagen, who had purchased the bust around 1978 for £240, managed to sell it on at a price of £132,000. The next buyer, Norman Leitman, managed to achieve a much higher price when he sold it via the auctioneers Sotheby's to Canadian collectors Joey and Toby Tanenbaum in 1983 for £2.78 million—the price had risen dramatically after art historian Irving Lavin had commented that "In my opinion the bust is not only the original, it is wholly autograph (i.e. by the master's own hand) and one of the most perfect and important of Bernini's early works." The Tanenbaums then donated the piece to the Art Gallery of Ontario; however, the circumstances of the donation are not entirely clear. The Tanenbaums had tried to sell the piece at a 1990 Christie's auction for more than US$7 million—while bids at the auction reached US$6 million, the auction failed to reach the expected target and the bust was withdrawn from that sale.

== See also ==
- List of works by Gian Lorenzo Bernini
