= Bust of Monsignor Pedro de Foix Montoya =

Sculpture by Gian Lorenzo Bernini

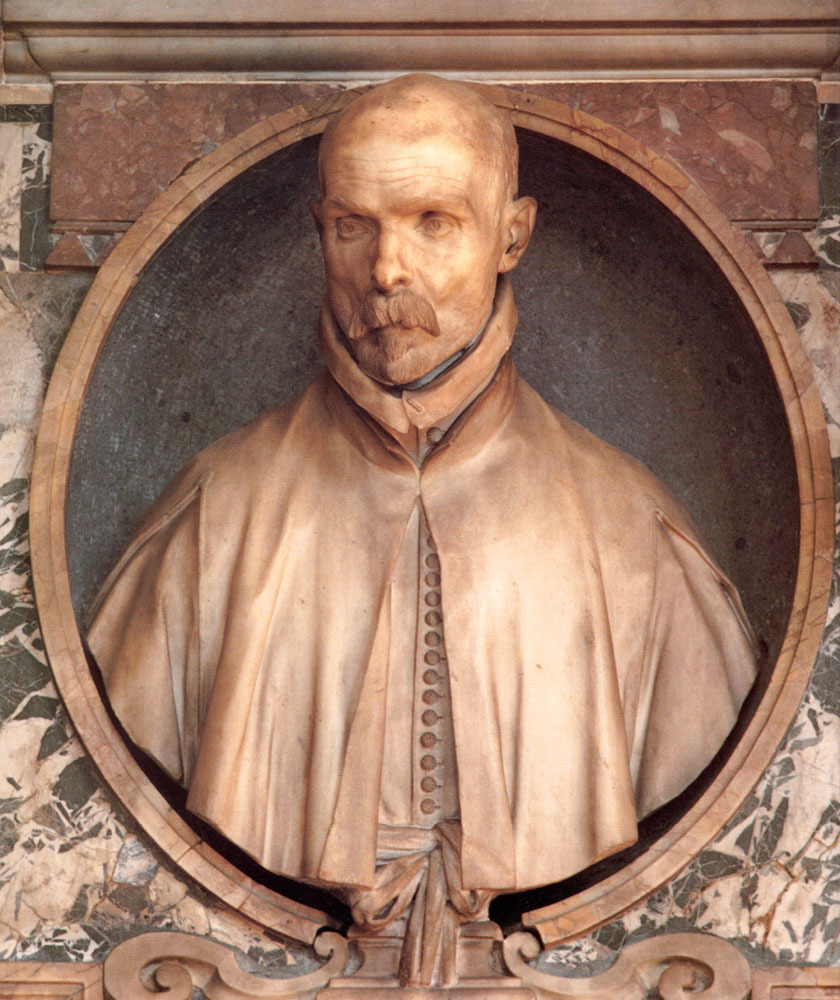
- Artist: Gian Lorenzo Bernini
- Year: 1621–1622
- Catalogue: 13
- Type: Sculpture
- Medium: Marble
- Dimensions: Life-size
- Location: Santa Maria di Monserrato; Rome; 41°53′45.40″N 12°28′08.69″E
- Preceded by: Bust of Pope Gregory XV
- Followed by: Bust of Cardinal Escoubleau de Sourdis

Bust of Monsignor Pedro de Foix Montoya is a sculpted portrait by the Italian artist Gianlorenzo Bernini. Executed in 1621 and 1622, it sits within a larger tomb created for Montoya, a Spanish lawyer working in Rome. The tomb was originally in the Spanish national church in Rome, San Giacomo degli Spagnuoli, but was moved in the nineteenth century when the church fell out of Spanish possession. The monument now sits in the refectory attached to the Roman church of Santa Maria di Monserrato. The architecture for the tomb was undertaken by Orazio Turriani.

== See also ==
- List of works by Gian Lorenzo Bernini
