= Bust of Cardinal Escoubleau de Sourdis =

Sculpture by Gian Lorenzo Bernini

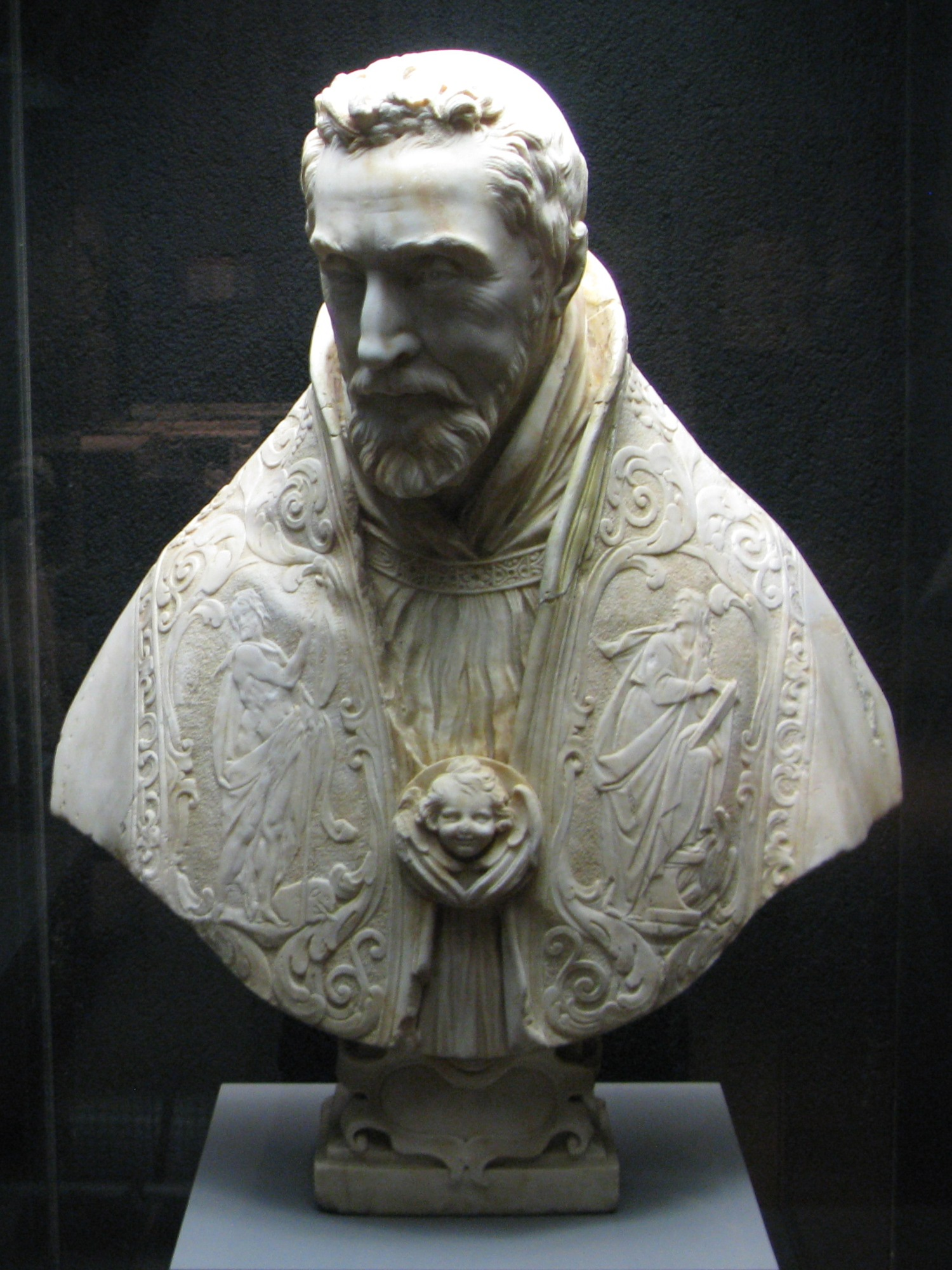
- Artist: Gian Lorenzo Bernini
- Year: 1622
- Catalogue: 14
- Type: Sculpture
- Medium: Marble
- Subject: François de Sourdis
- Dimensions: Life-size
- Location: Musée d'Aquitaine; Bordeaux
- Preceded by: Bust of Monsignor Pedro de Foix Montoya
- Followed by: Bust of Cardinal Roberto Bellarmine

The Bust of Cardinal Escoubleau de Sourdis is a marble portrait sculpture by the Italian artist Gian Lorenzo Bernini. Executed in 1622, the work depicts François de Sourdis. It is currently in the Musée d'Aquitaine in Bordeaux, France.

== See also ==
- List of works by Gian Lorenzo Bernini
