= Musée d'Aquitaine =

History museum in Bordeaux, France

Museum of Aquitaine
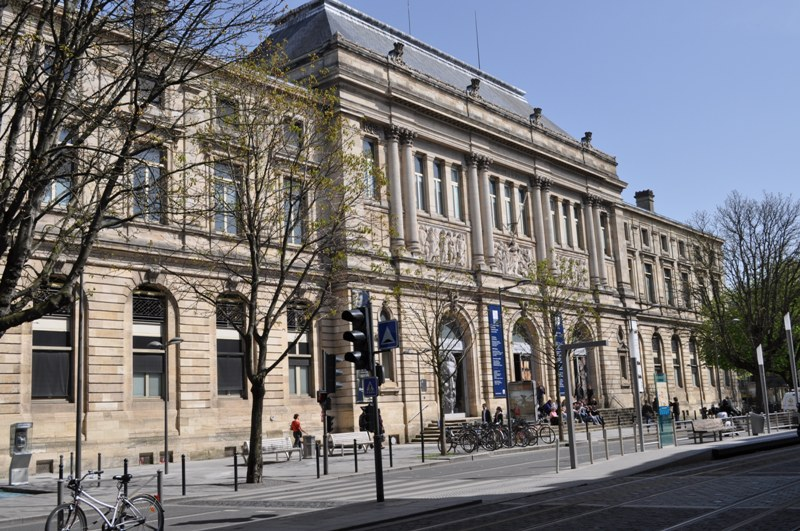

- Location within France
- Established: 1963
- Location: 20 cours Pasteur; 33000 Bordeaux France
- Coordinates: 44.83564°N 0.57497°W
- Visitors: 111,919 (2003) 88,738 (2004) 99,880 (2005) 101,897 (2006) 93,661 (2007)
- Website: Official site

The Museum of Aquitaine (French: Musée d'Aquitaine) is a collection of objects and documents from the history of Bordeaux and Aquitaine.

== History ==
In the 16th century, the site of the Musée d'Aquitaine housed the convent of the Feuillants. Destroyed during the Revolution, it became a high school which burned down in 1871, then a university.

In 1960, the Lapidary Museum (created in 1783 by the Academy of Bordeaux) changed its primary vocation and brought together the collections of other museums (Prehistoric and Ethnographic Museum, Museum of Arms and Ancient Objects). It took the name of Museum of Aquitaine in 1962.

Initially, the museum shared the premises of the Musée des Beaux-Arts de Bordeaux, in a building designed by Charles Burguet.

In 1980, the Archaeological Society of Bordeaux signed an agreement with the city of Bordeaux to deposit the majority of its collections at the Museum of Aquitaine. Within the framework of this agreement, the museum's mission is to make these collections known without alienating their property.

Then, on January 9, 1987, the museum moved into the premises of the former Faculty of Letters and Sciences, a building built in the 1880s by the municipal architect Charles Durand and located in place of the former convents of the Feuillants and the Visitation.

At the start of the 21st century, the Musée d'Aquitaine had 111,919 visitors in 2003, 88,738 in 2004, 99,880 in 2005, 101,897 in 2006, and 93,661 in 2007.

== Location ==
In the center of Bordeaux, close to Tour Pey-Berland and St. Andrew's Cathedral, the museum is accessible by line B of the tramway de Bordeaux from station Musée d'Aquitaine.

== Collections ==
The different collections include more than 70,000 pieces. They trace the history of Bordeaux and Aquitaine from Prehistory to today. 5,000 pieces of art from Africa and Oceania also testify to the harbor history of the city.

The museum has permanent collections and temporary exhibitions. The permanent collections are on two floors. On the ground floor are pieces on Prehistory, Protohistory, Roman Empire, the Middle Ages and the Modern Era. At level 1, there are 18th century pieces (Atlantic trade and slavery), world cultures, 19th and 20th centuries (Bordeaux port-e-du monde, 1800–1939).

In 2009, the Aquitaine Museum opened new permanent rooms dedicated to the role of Bordeaux in the slave trade.

Spaces dedicaded to Atlantic slave trade and its legacies

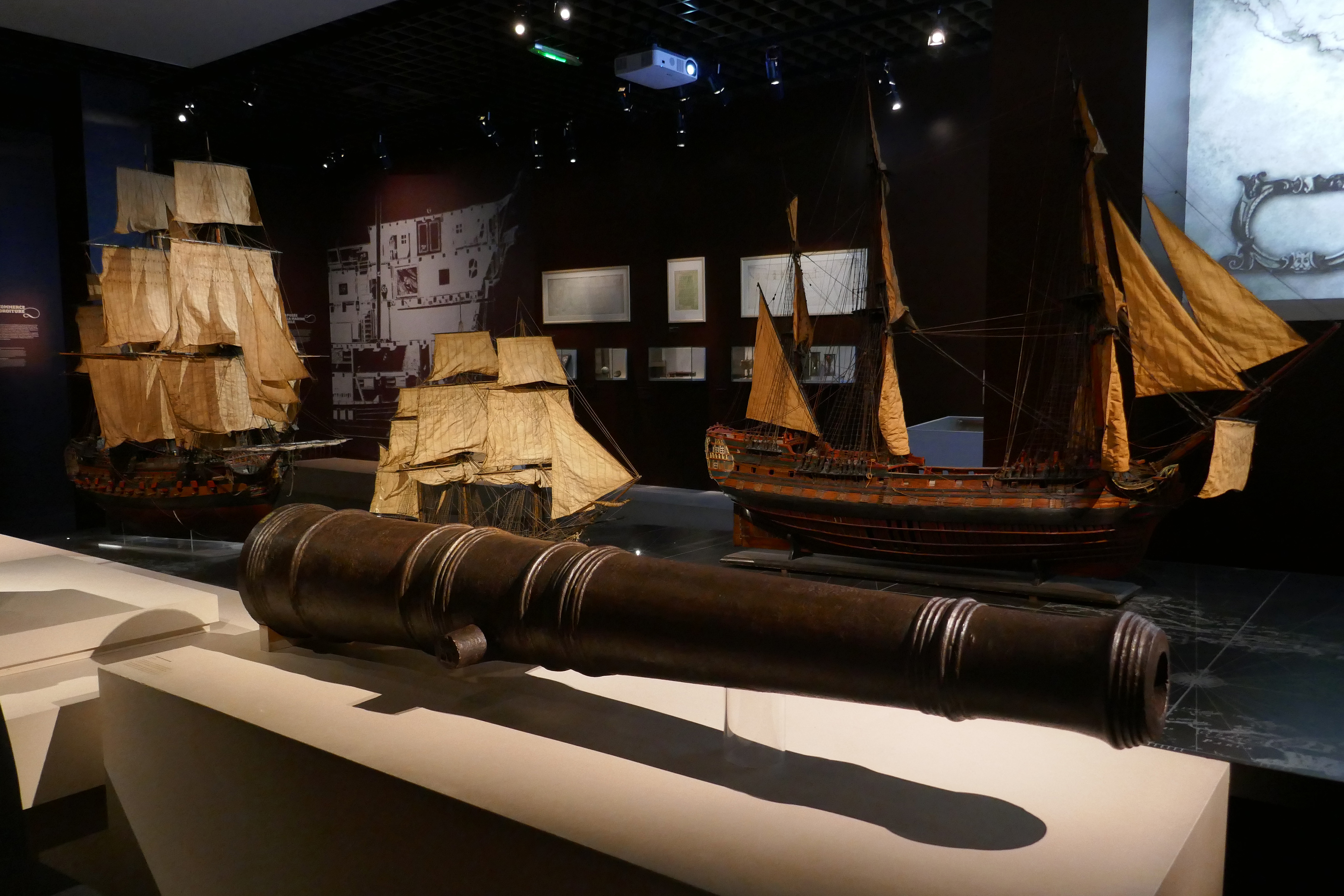
Cannon and model ships

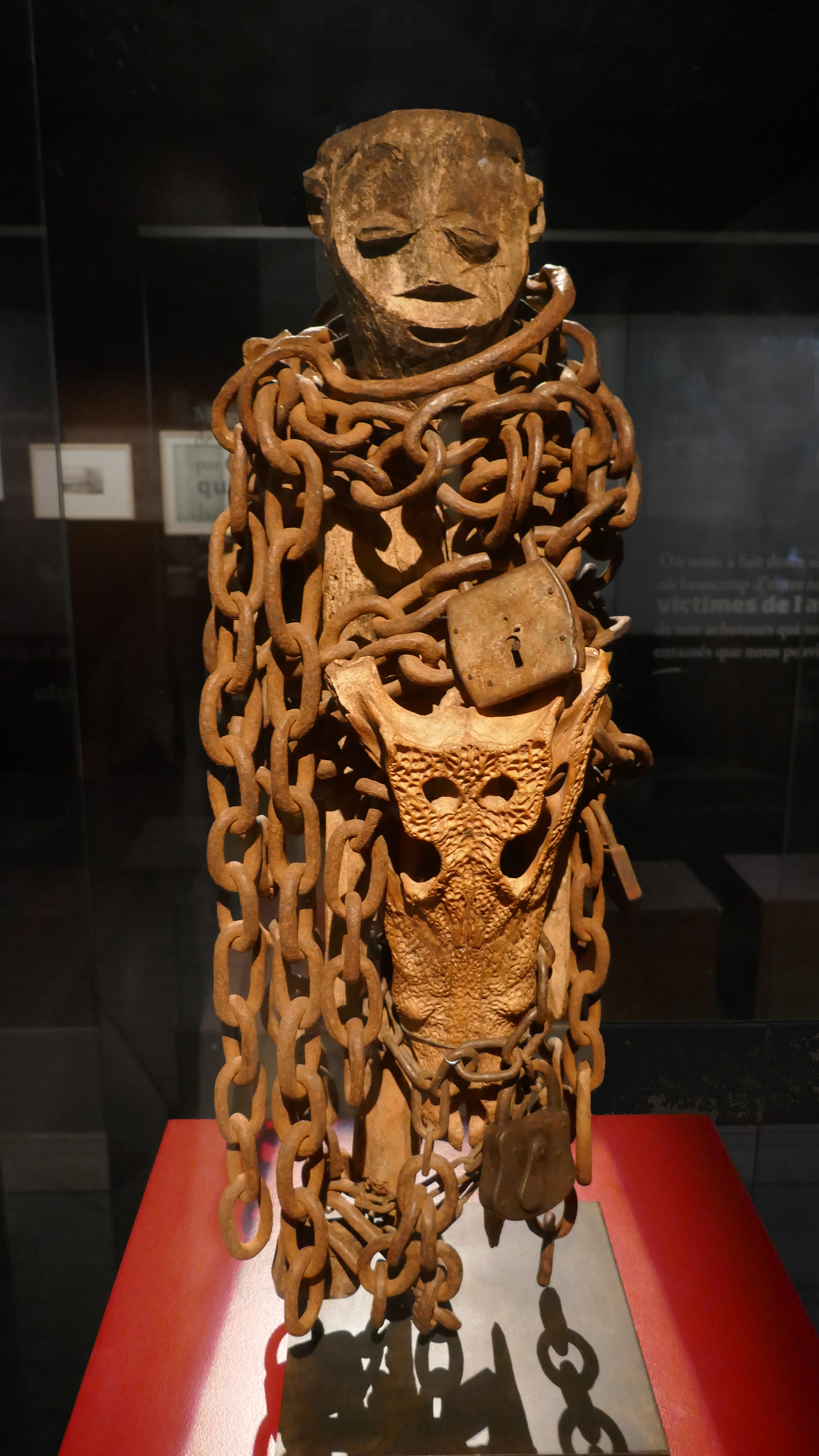
Fon fetish

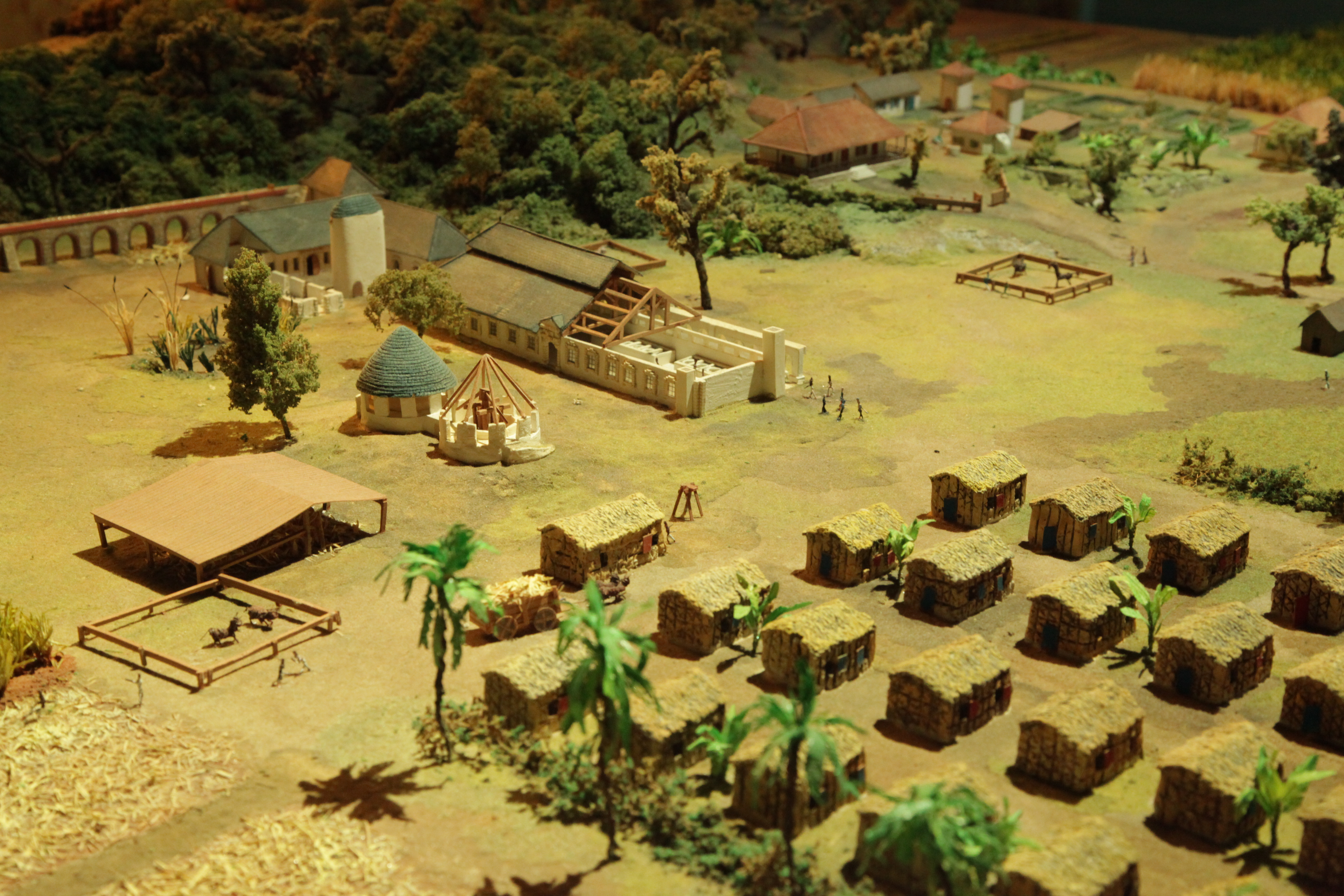
Model of a French colonial plantation

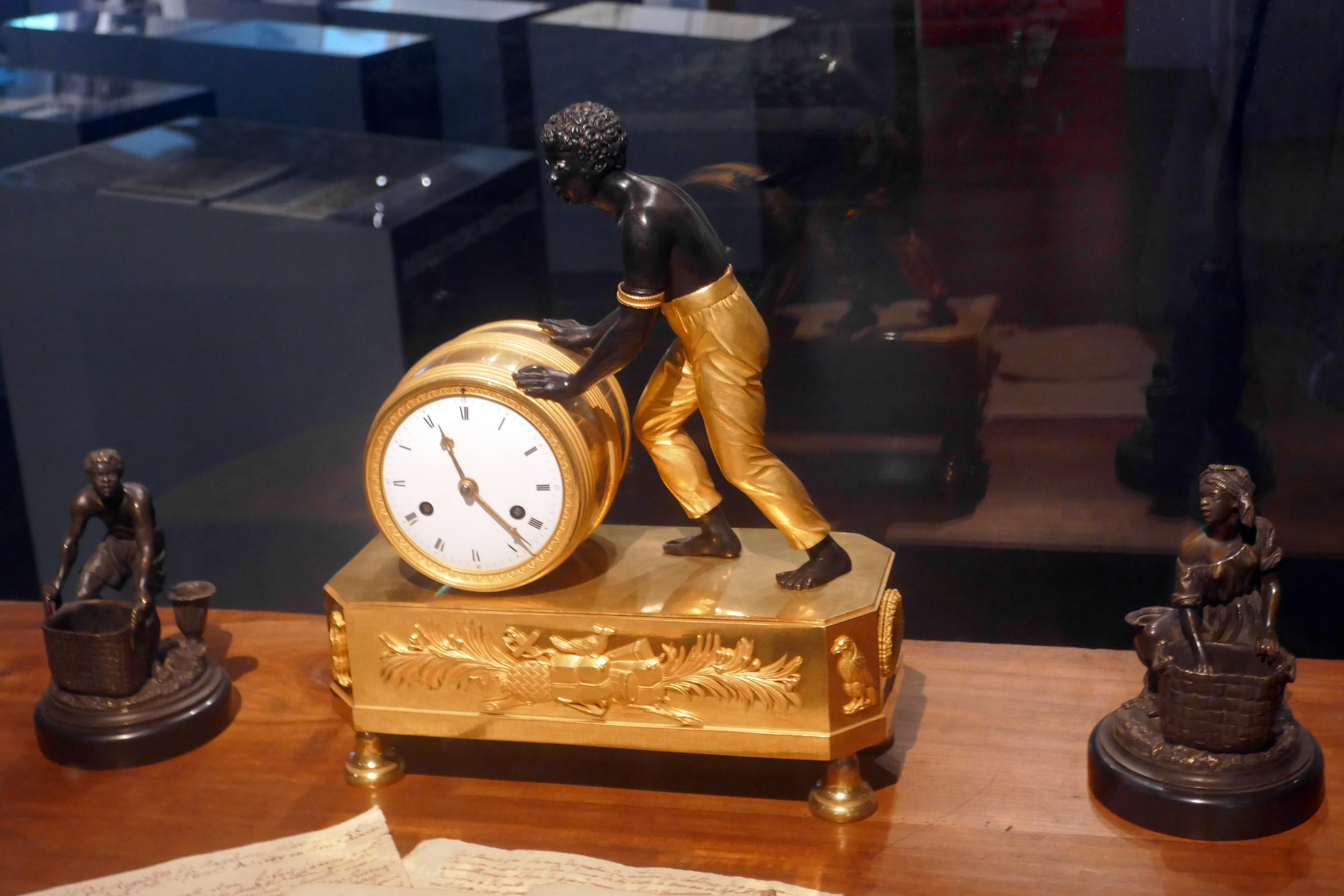
Clock known as the "Negro clock"

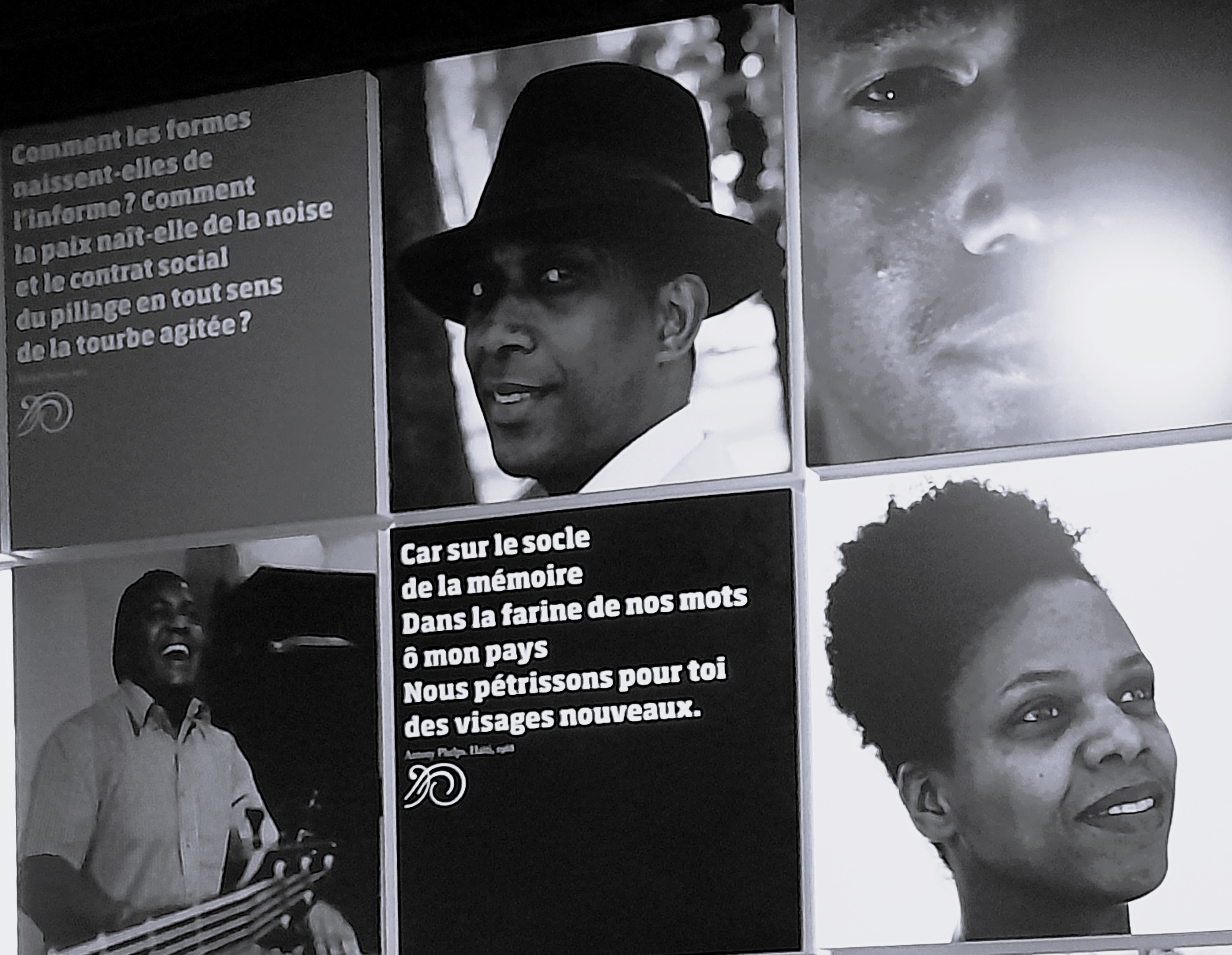
Gallery of portraits of Afro-descendants from Bordeaux. At the top, in the center, Karfa Diallo

Rooms devoted to the nineteenth were reopened in February 2014.

Rooms of the exhibition Bordeaux, port/gate of the world: 1800-1939

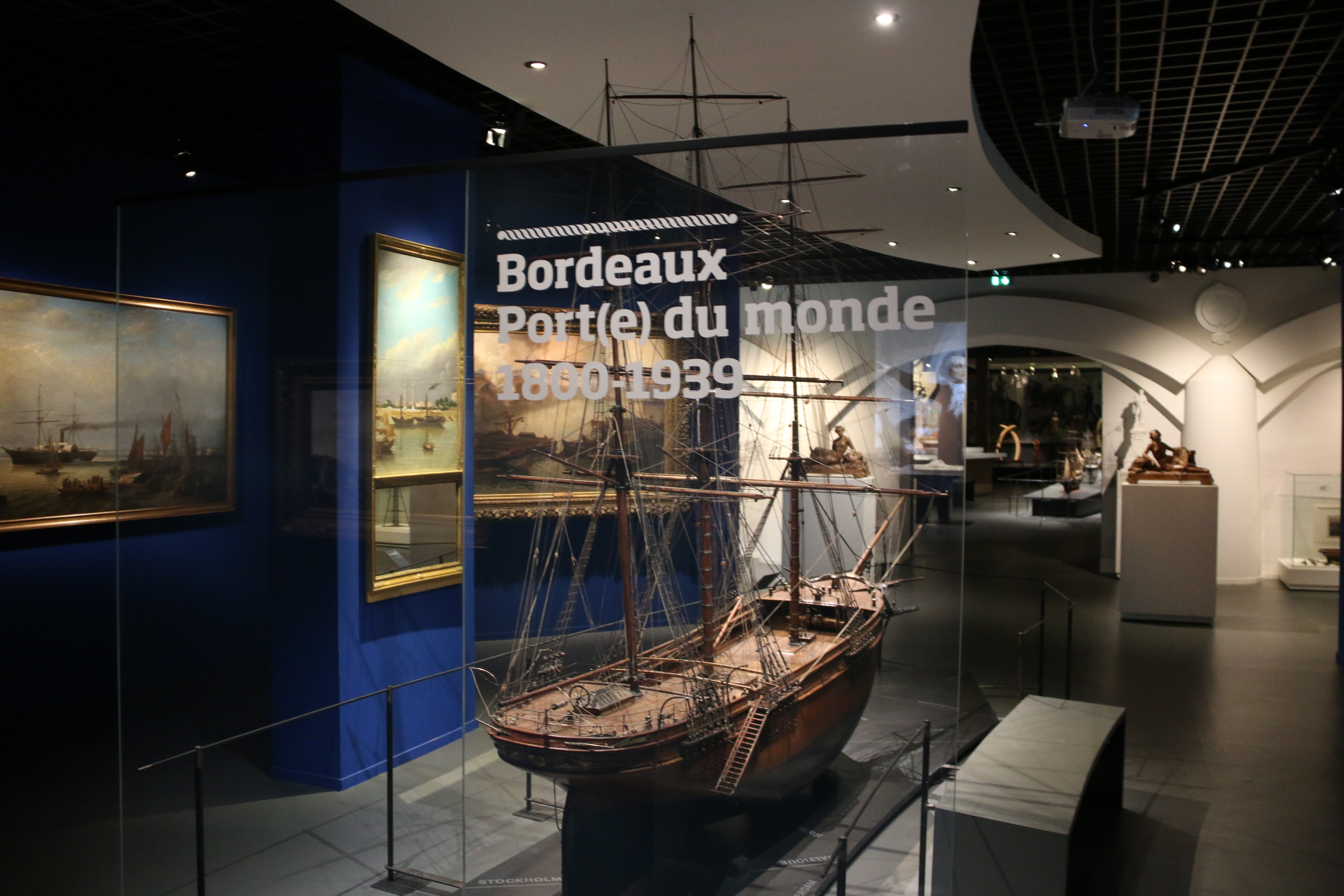
ship models and painting

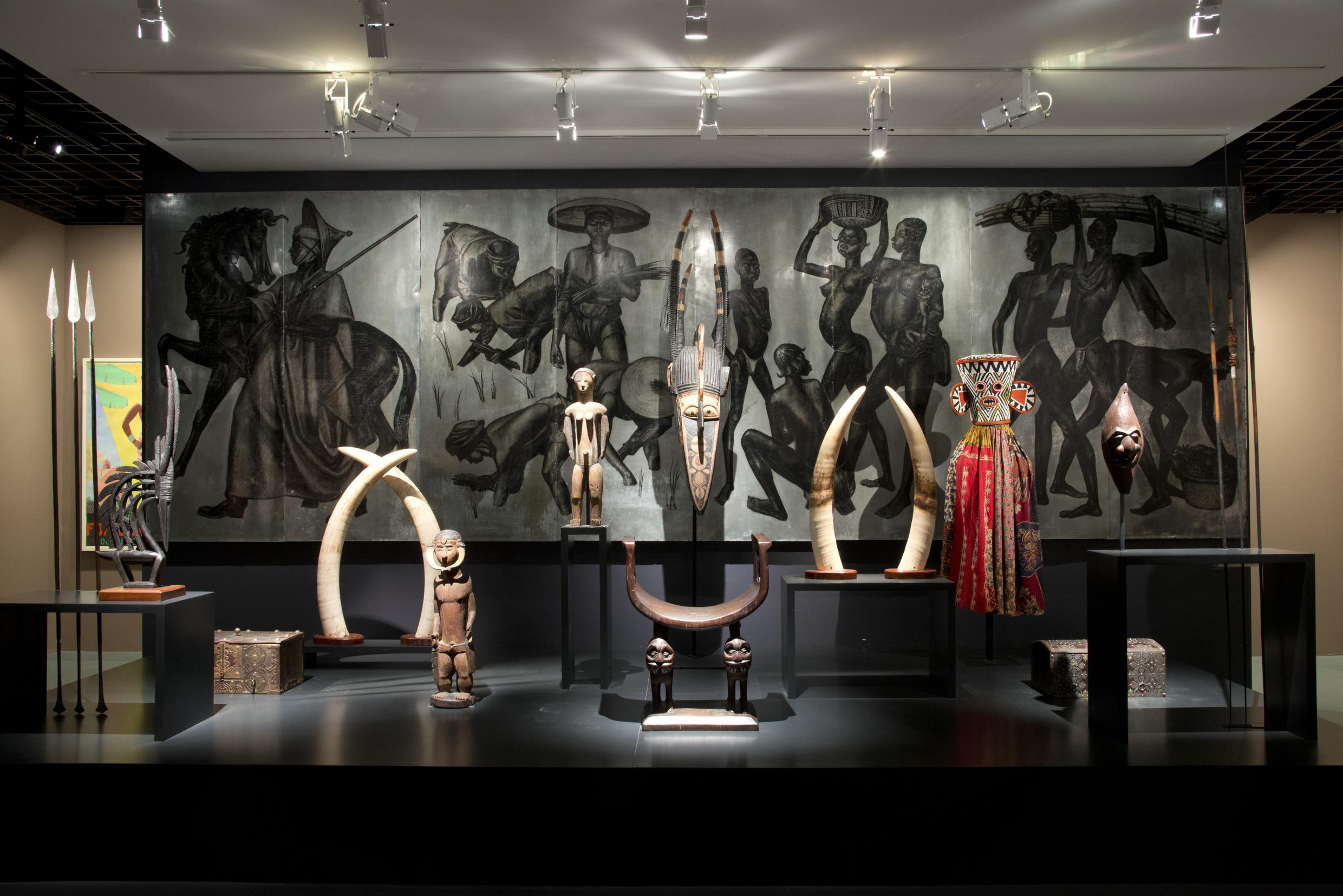
African pieces in front of an Art deco painting

== Notable pieces ==
- The Venus of Laussel
- The Gallic Gold torque
- The cenotaph of Michel de Montaigne
- Bernini, Bust of Cardinal Escoubleau de Sourdis
- Bronze Statue of Hercules
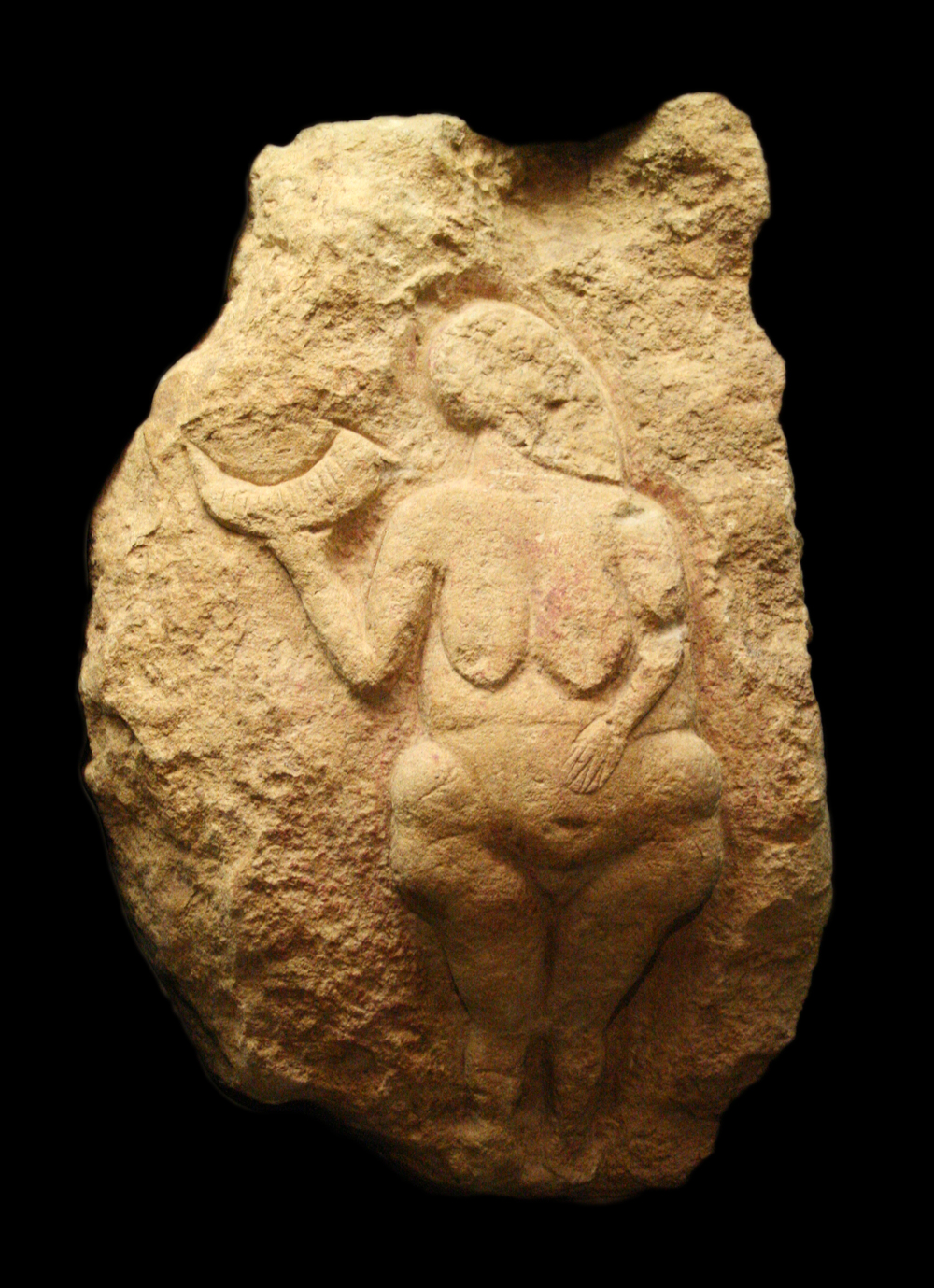
Venus of Laussel

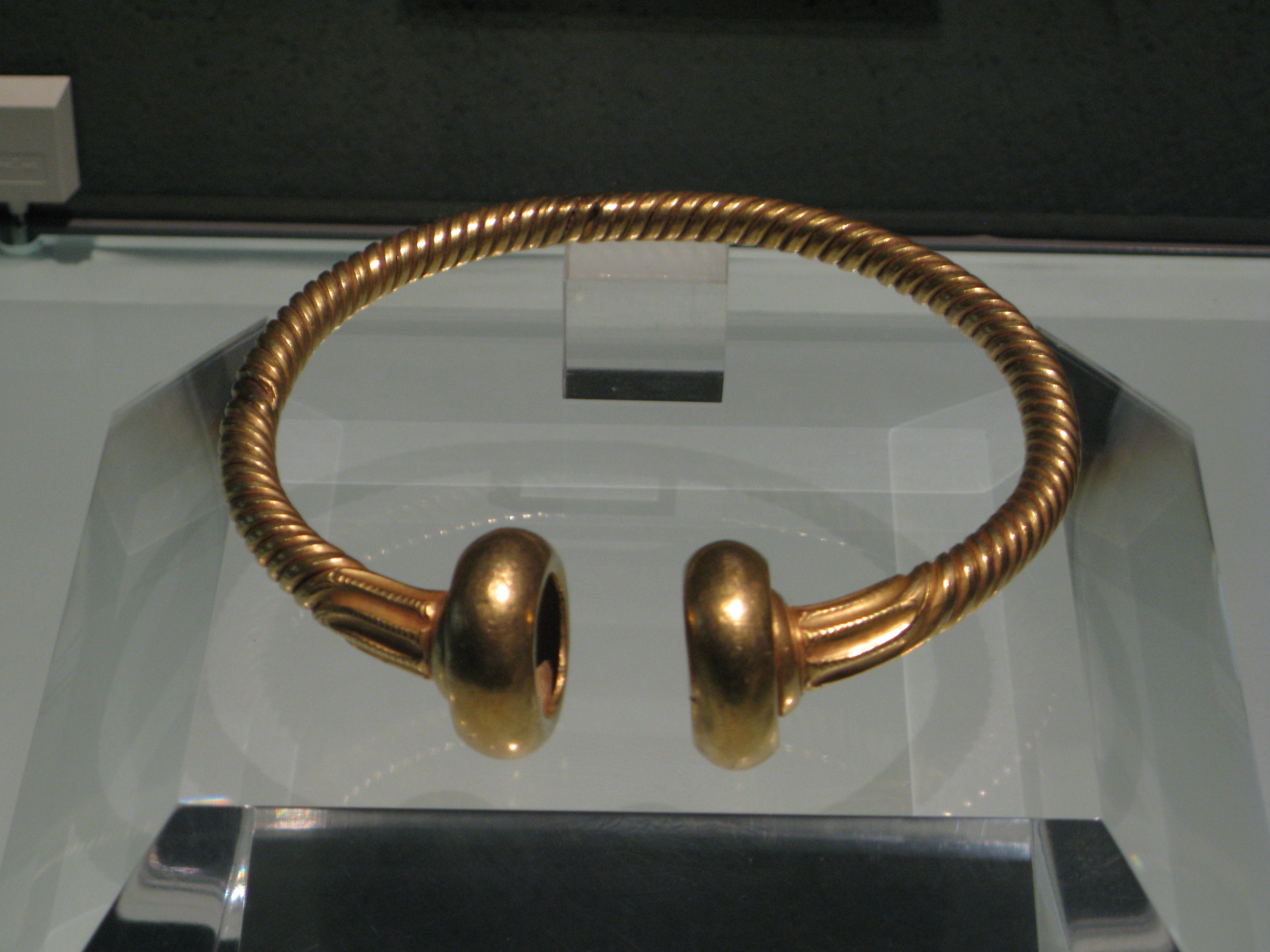
Gallic Gold torque

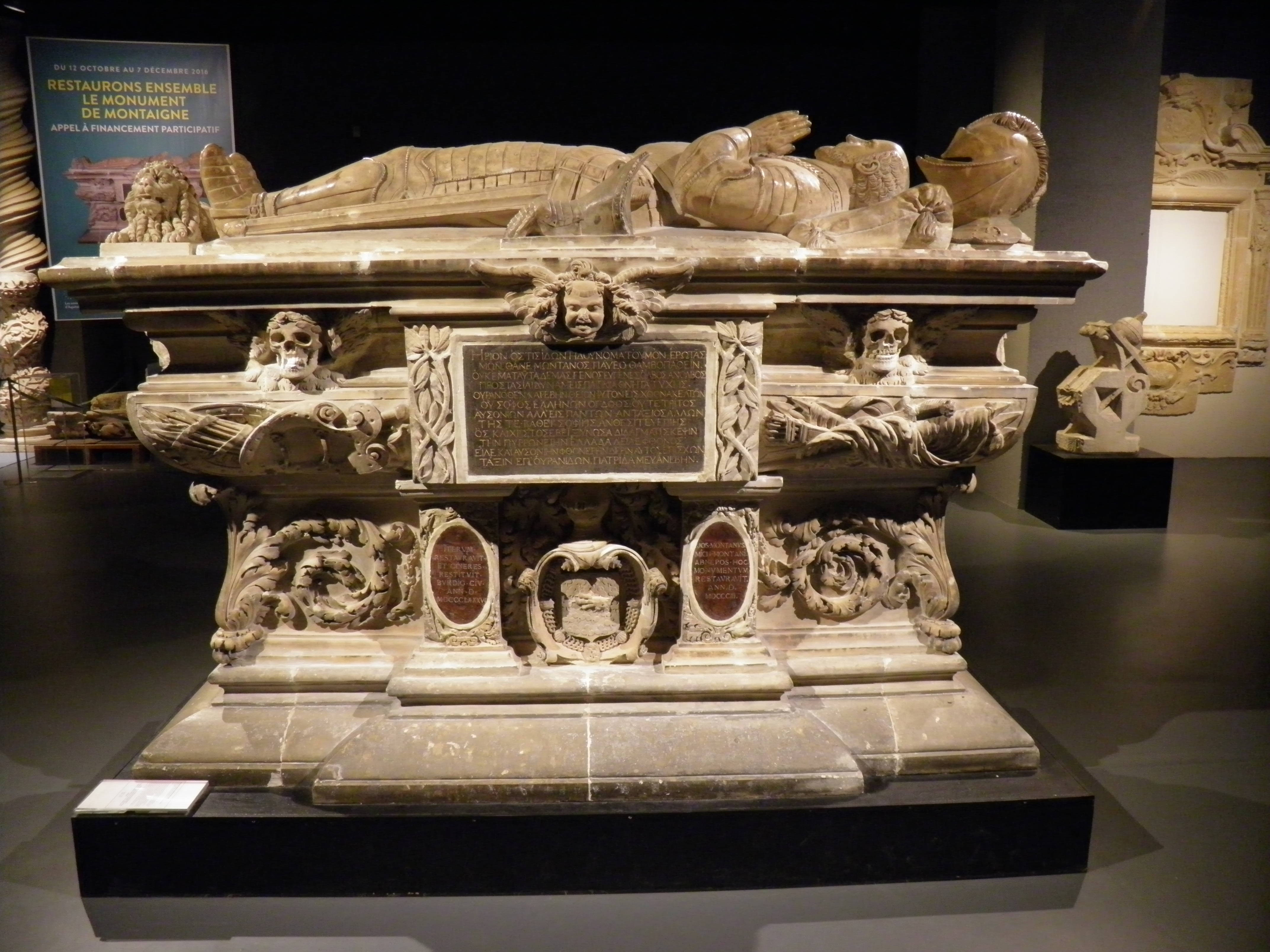
Cenotaph of Michel de Montaigne

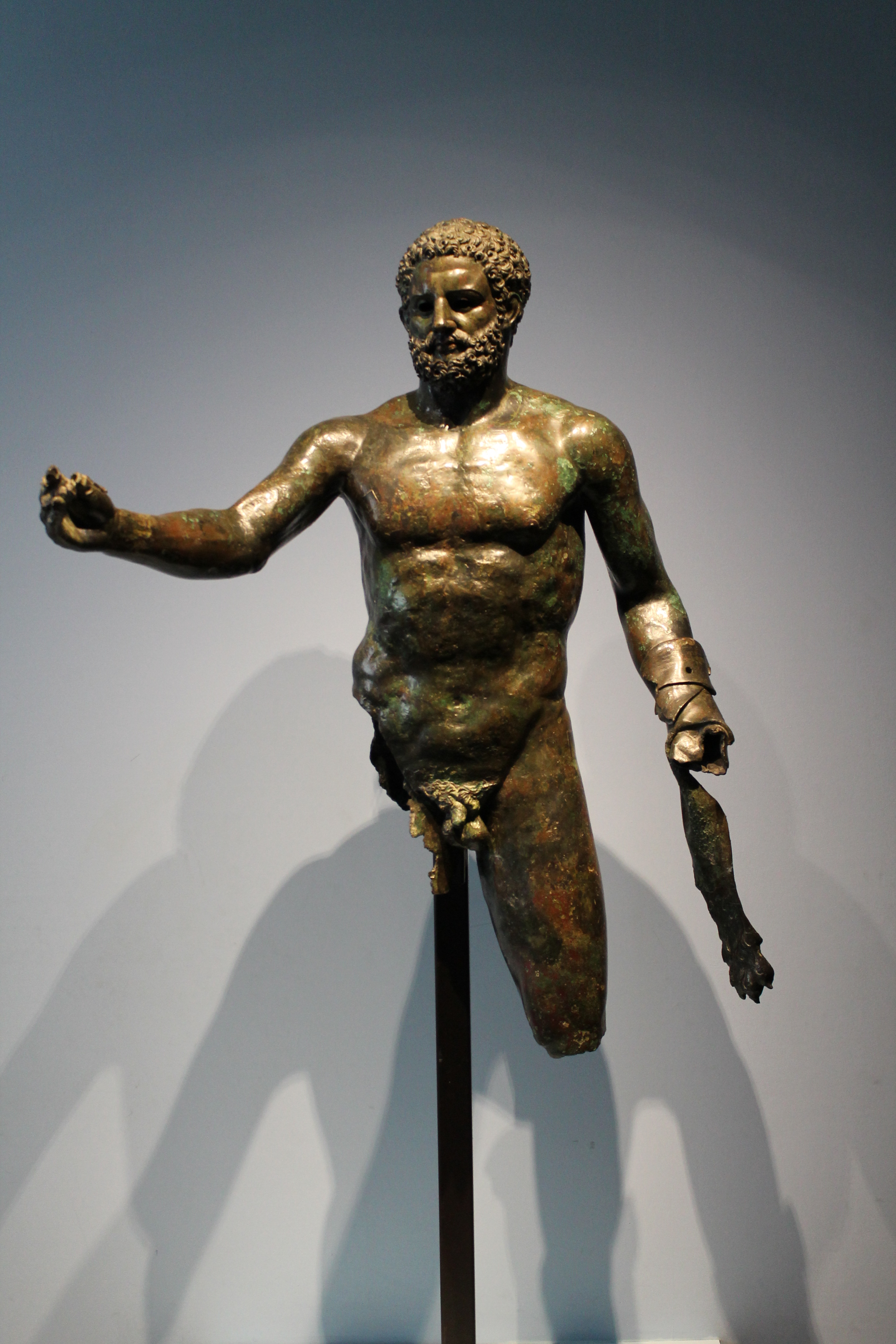
Statue of Hercules

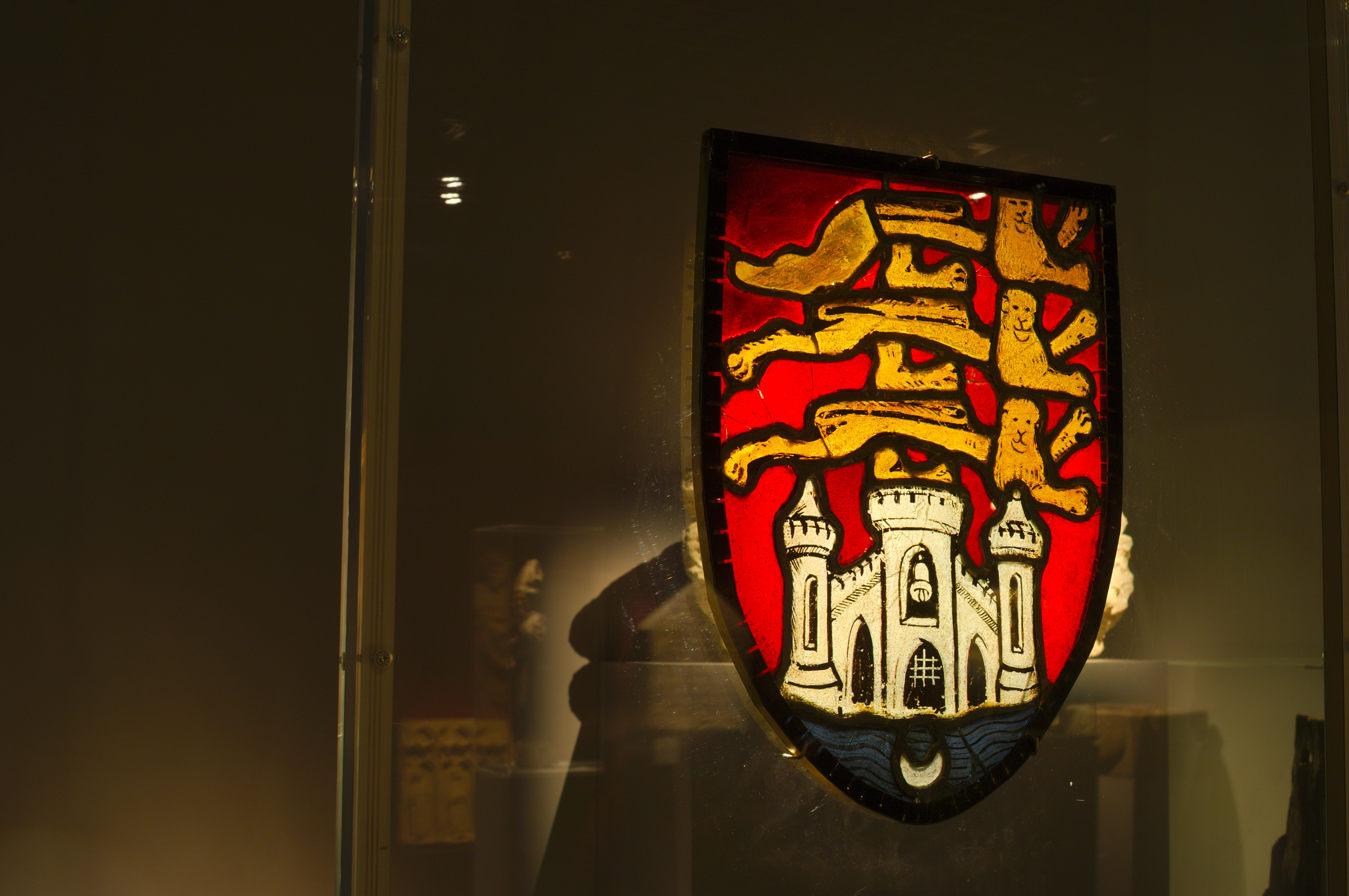
Stained-glass window with the first arms of Bordeaux
