= Busts of Cardinals Agostino and Pietro Valier (Bernini) =

Sculptures by Gian Lorenzo Bernini

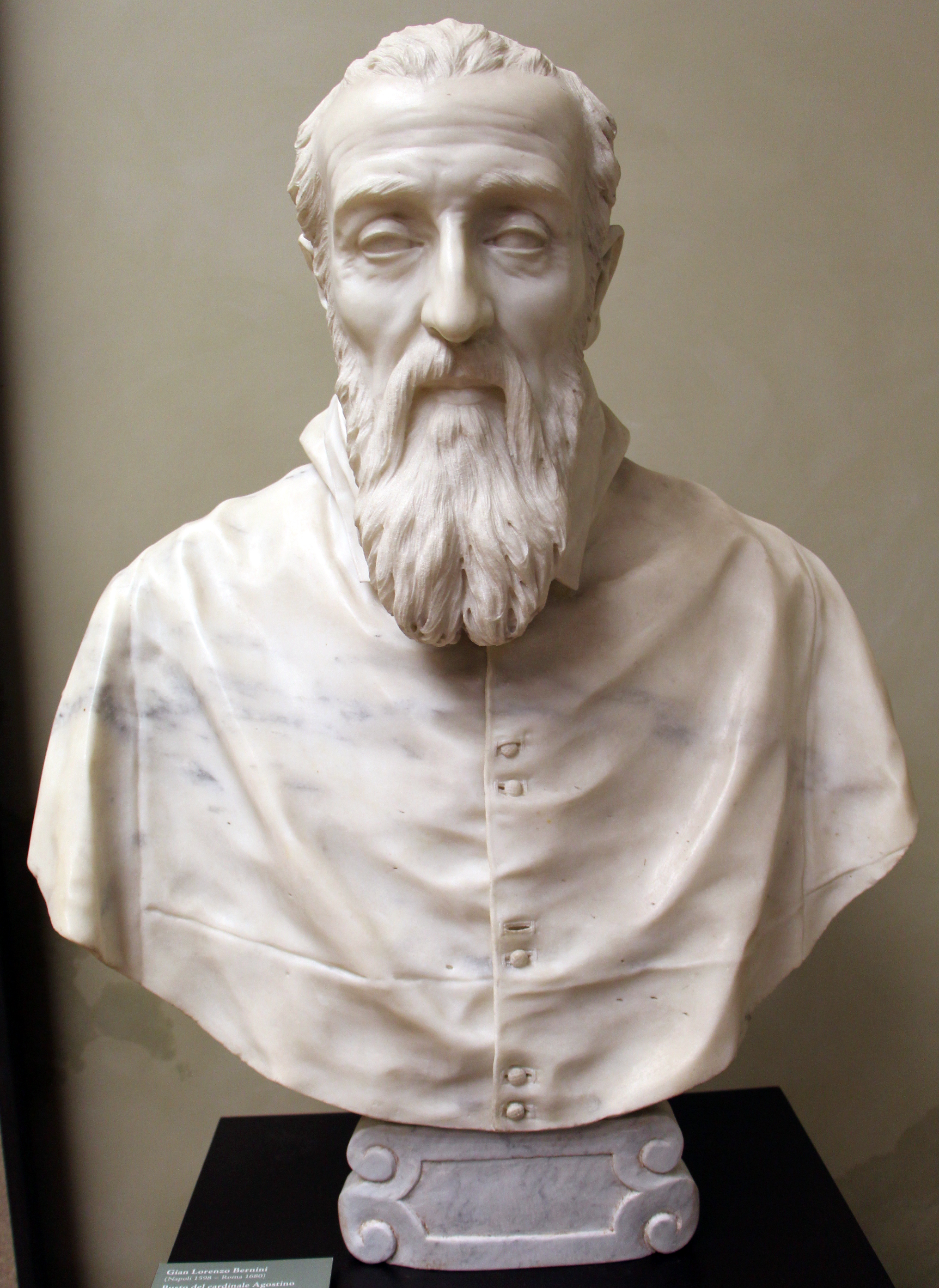
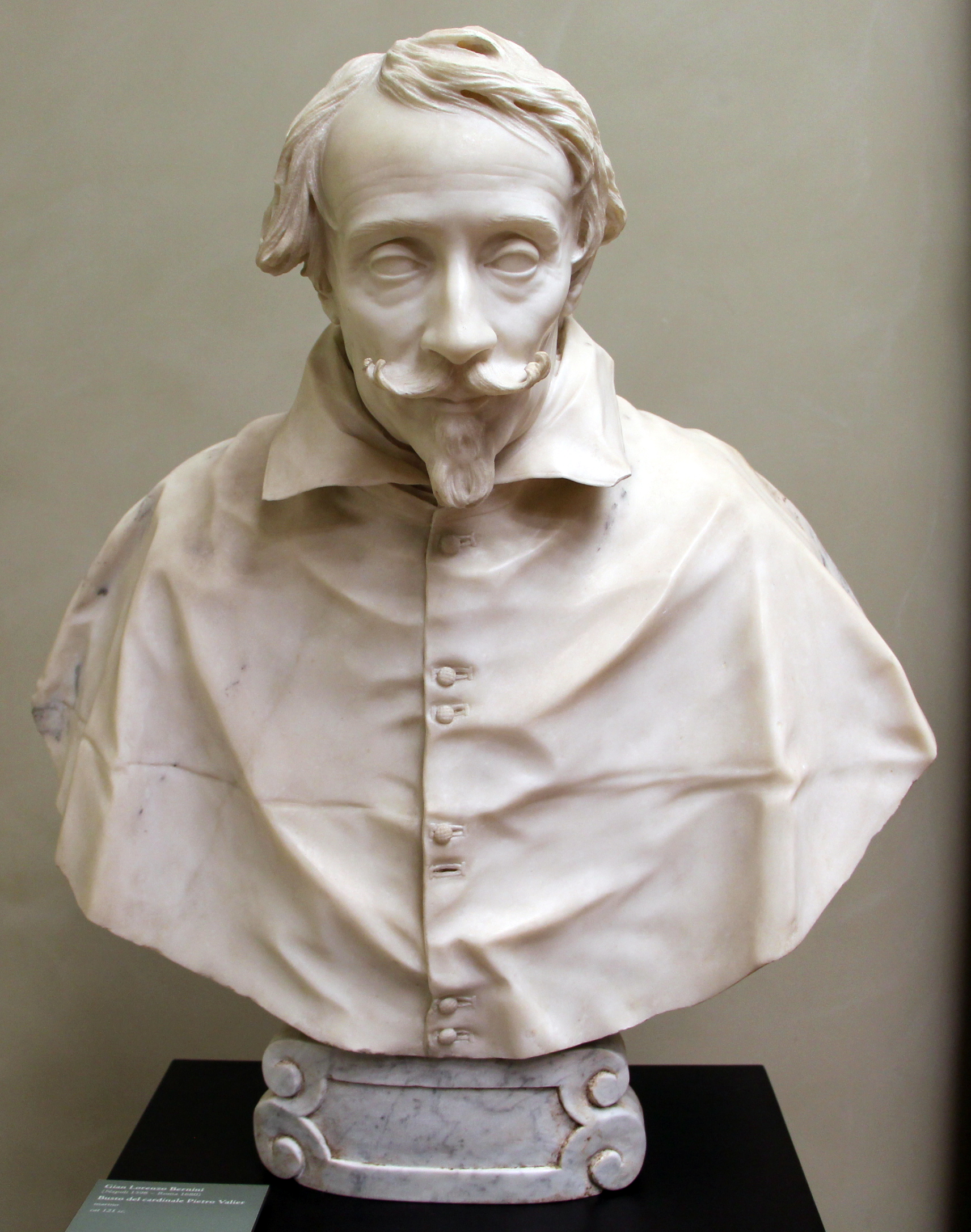
- Agostino Valier Pietro Valier
- Artist: Gian Lorenzo Bernini
- Year: 1627
- Catalogue: 25
- Type: Sculpture
- Medium: Marble
- Location: Ca’ D’Oro; Venice
- Preceded by: Bust of Camilla Barbadoni
- Followed by: Memorial to Carlo Barberini

The Busts of Cardinals Agostino and Pietro Valier are two portrait sculptures executed by the Italian artists Gianlorenzo Bernini and his studio. They were commissioned in 1627. It is likely that the bust of Pietro was done largely by Andrea Bolgi following Bernini's design. The more lively portrait of Agostino is probably Bernini's design and execution.

The two sculptures remain in the Seminary in Venice, for which they were originally built.

== See also ==
- List of works by Gian Lorenzo Bernini
