= Bust of Camilla Barbadoni =

Sculpture by Gian Lorenzo Bernini

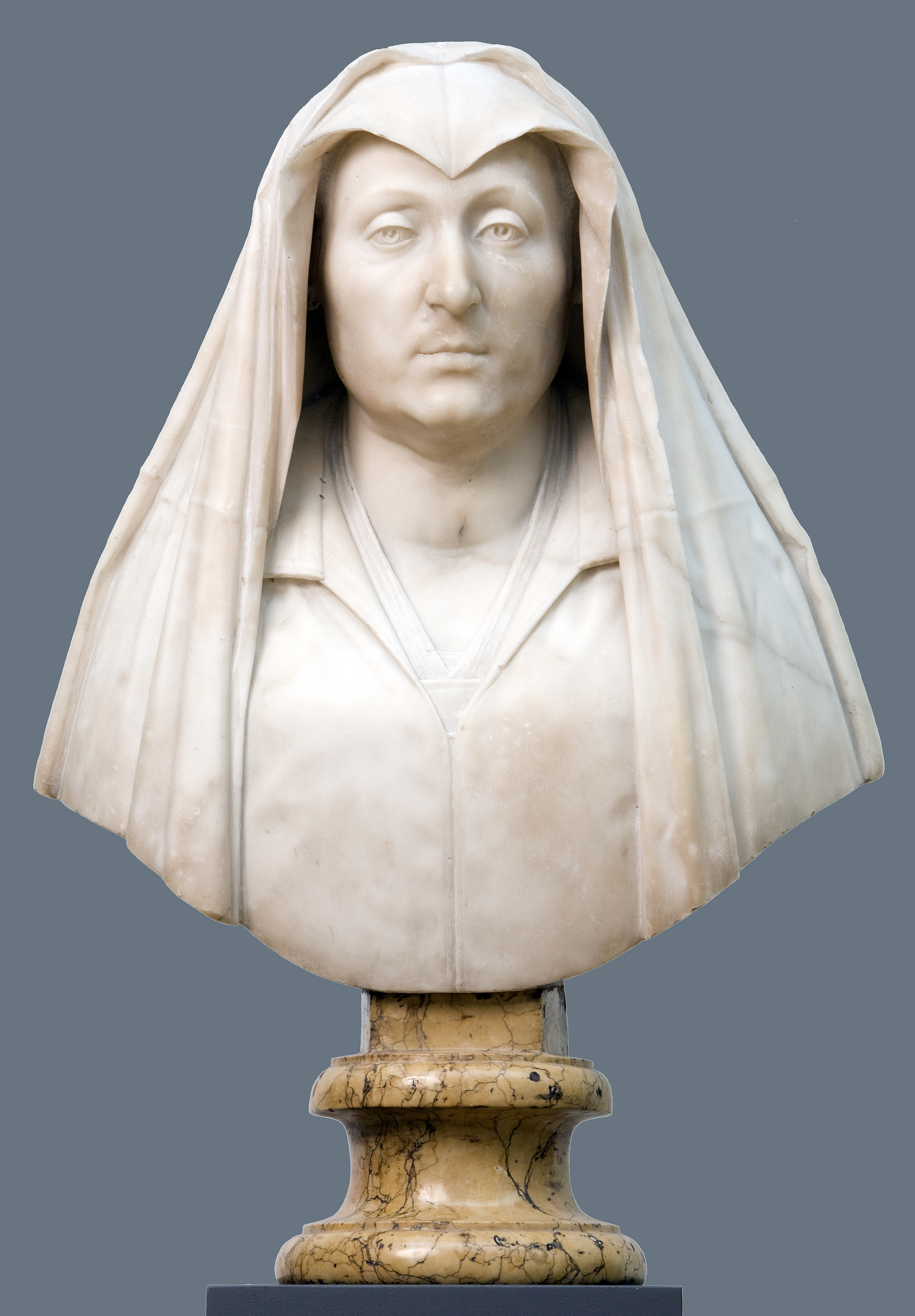
- Artist: Gian Lorenzo Bernini
- Year: 1619
- Catalogue: 24
- Type: Sculpture
- Medium: Marble
- Dimensions: 60 cm (24 in)
- Location: National Gallery of Denmark; Copenhagen
- Preceded by: Bust of Francesco Barberini
- Followed by: Busts of Cardinals Agostino and Pietro Valier (Bernini)

The Bust of Camilla Barbadoni is a marble sculpture by the Italian artist Gian Lorenzo Bernini. Executed in 1619, it depicts Camilla Barbadoni, the mother of Maffeo Barberini, who had died in 1609. Barberini later became Pope Urban VIII in 1623.

== See also ==
- List of works by Gian Lorenzo Bernini
