= Charity with Four Children =

Sculpture by Gian Lorenzo Bernini

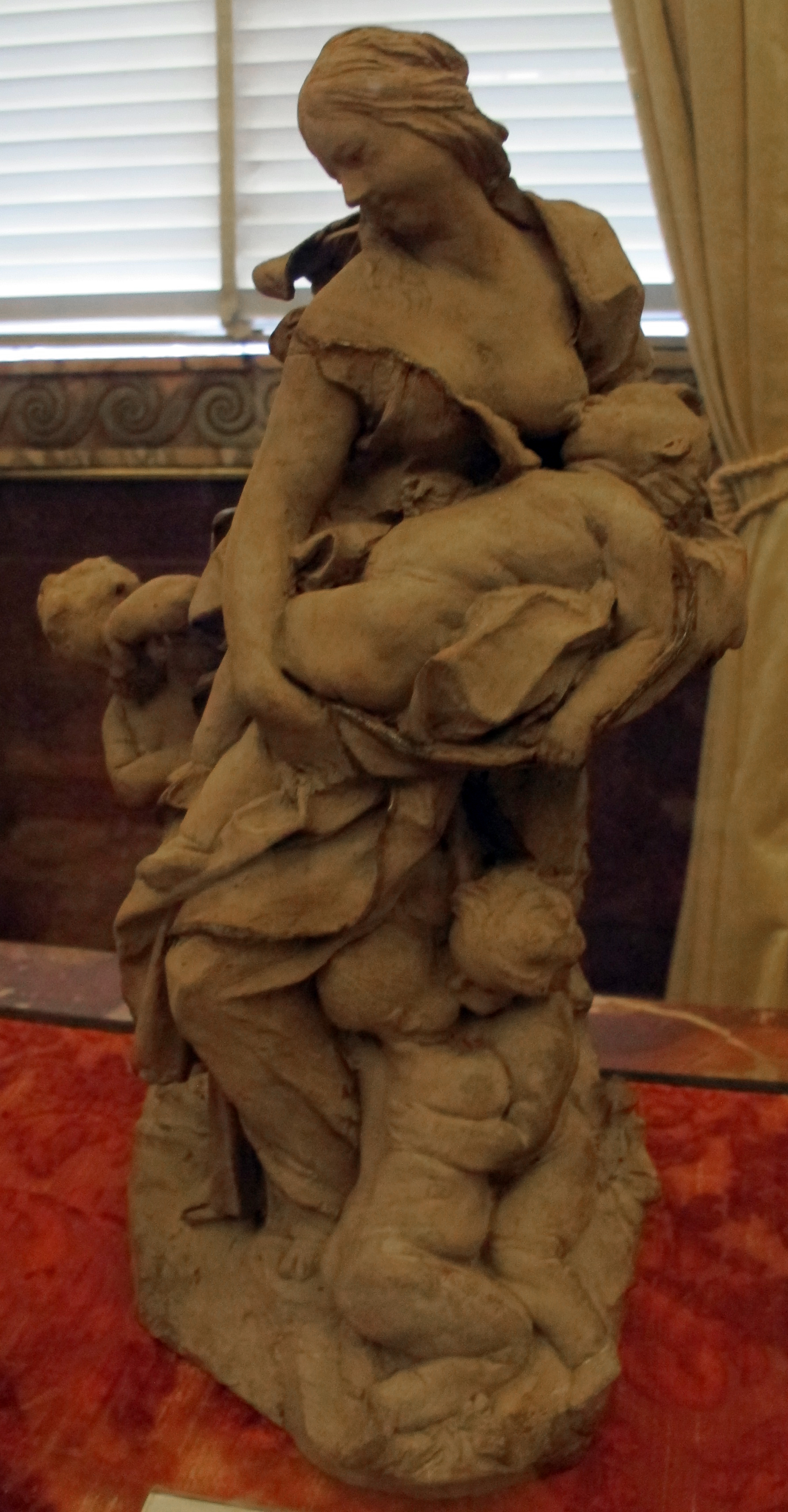
- Artist: Gian Lorenzo Bernini
- Year: 1627–1628
- Catalogue: 30
- Type: Sculpture
- Medium: Terracotta
- Subject: Charity
- Dimensions: 39 cm (15 in)
- Location: Vatican Museums; Vatican City; 41°54′23″N 12°27′16″E
- Preceded by: Statue of Carlo Barberini
- Followed by: Two Busts of Cardinal Scipione Borghese

Charity with Four Children also called Charity With Four Putti [Schuder] is a sculpture by the Italian artist Gian Lorenzo Bernini. Executed between 1627 and 1628, the work is housed in the Vatican Museums in Vatican City. The small terracotta sculpture represents Charity breast-feeding a child, with three other children playing. The work includes an imprint of Bernini's thumbprint in the clay.

== Background ==
The sculpture is an allegorical group, and was created as a model for the tomb of Pope Urban VIII. It is sixteen inches high, is made from terracotta clay, and represents Charity breast-feeding a child, with three other children playing. Its creation date is uncertain: Raggio dates the sculpture's execution to between 1627 and 1628, although others have suggested it may have been created closer to 1630, or not later than 1634.

There is an imprint of Bernini's thumbprint in the clay.

== History ==
The work is housed in the Bibliotheca Apostolica Vaticana in the Vatican Museums in Vatican City.

It was included in the touring exhibition Saint Peter and the Vatican: The Legacy of the Popes, which opened in Fort Lauderdale in August 2003. One reviewer called it "The most artistically rewarding work in the show...this delicate sculpture of a mother and infant is alive with movement and human feeling. It possesses an intimacy that comes from the actual touch of Bernini's hand; on the back, you can see the indentations his fingers made in the clay."

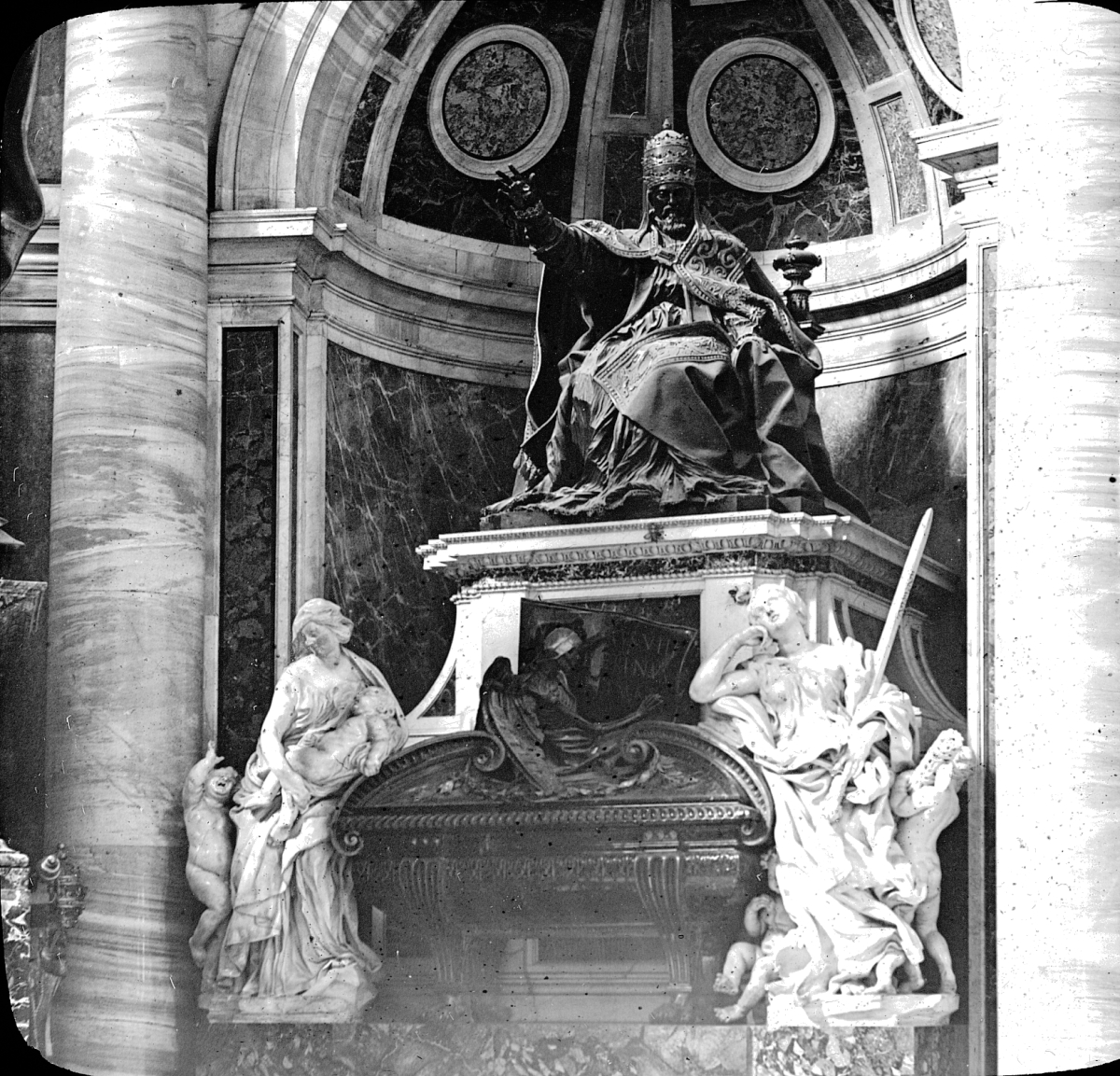
Tomb of Pope Urban VIII, with the final form of Charity on the left

In 2012 the sculpture featured in Bernini: Sculpting in Clay at the Metropolitan Museum of Art, New York. It was the earliest work included in the show.

== See also ==
- List of works by Gian Lorenzo Bernini
