= Memorial to Carlo Barberini =

Memorial by Gian Lorenzo Bernini

- Artist: Gian Lorenzo Bernini
- Year: 1630
- Subject: Carlo Barberini
- Location: Santa Maria in Ara Coeli, Rome
- Preceded by: Busts of Cardinals Agostino and Pietro Valier
- Followed by: Statue of Carlo Barberini

The Memorial to Carlo Barberini is a large memorial, featuring two allegorical statues and an inscription. It was designed by the Italian artist Gian Lorenzo Bernini upon the death of Carlo in 1630, and subsequently executed by Bernini and his workshop. It is in the church of Santa Maria in Aracoeli in Rome.

== See also ==
- List of works by Gian Lorenzo Bernini
