= Statue of Carlo Barberini =

Sculpture by Gian Lorenzo Bernini and Alessandro Algardi

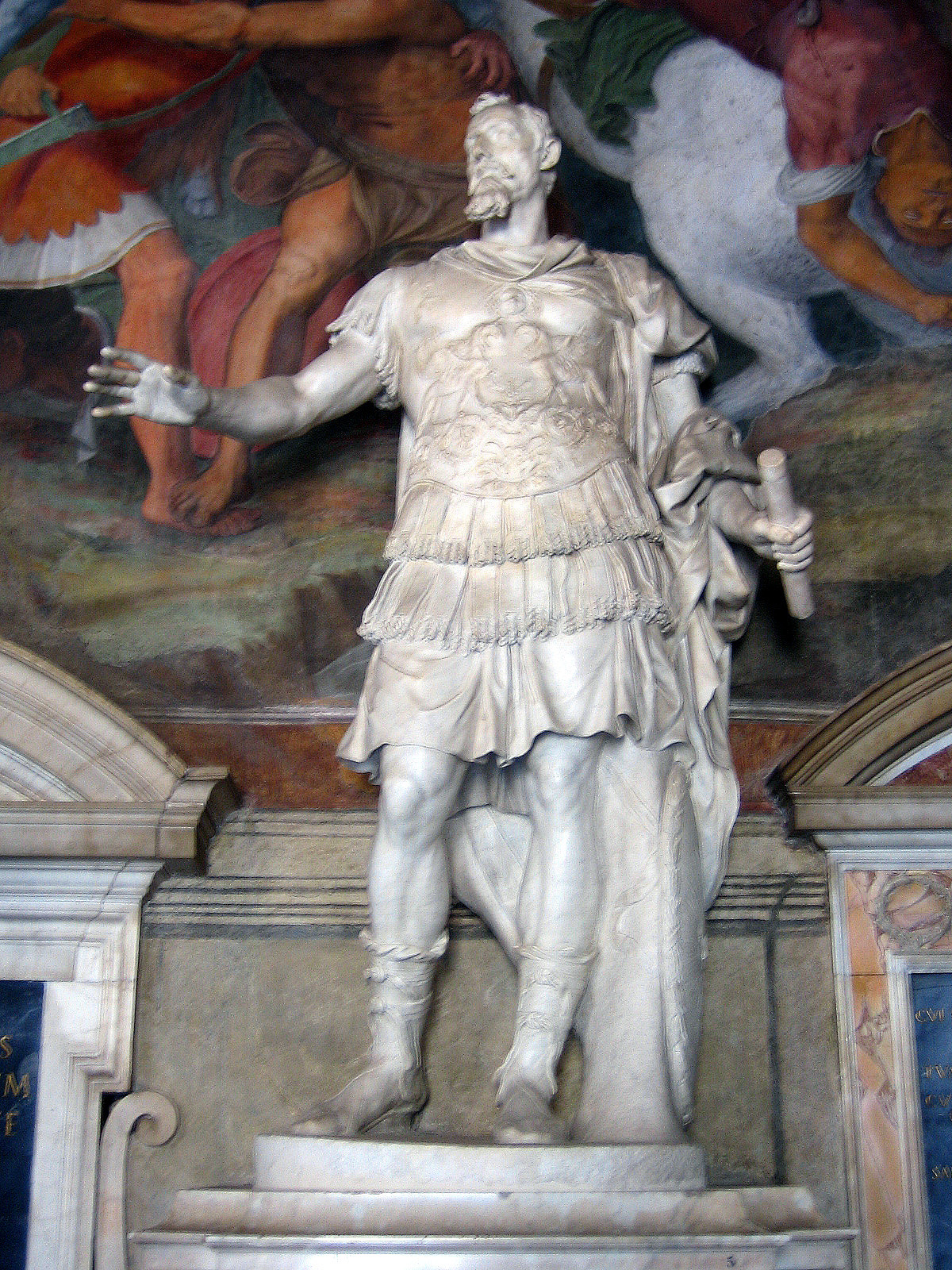
- Artist: Gian Lorenzo Bernini, Alessandro Algardi
- Year: 1630
- Catalogue: 27
- Type: Sculpture
- Medium: Marble
- Location: Palazzo dei Conservatori, Capitoline Museums; Rome
- Preceded by: Memorial to Carlo Barberini
- Followed by: Charity with Four Children

The Statue of Carlo Barberini was a large statue of the brother of Pope Urban VIII, Carlo Barberini, erected in the Palazzo dei Conservatori, Rome, following his death in 1630. The statue made use of an existing antique statue of Julius Caesar. The Roman authorities then commissioned the two most renowned sculptures of the day, Gianlorenzo Bernini and Alessandro Algardi, to add to the torso; Bernini worked on the head and Algardi on the limbs.

== See also ==
- List of works by Gian Lorenzo Bernini
