= Two Busts of Cardinal Scipione Borghese =

Sculpture by Gianlorenzo Bernini

Busts of Cardinal Scipione Borghese
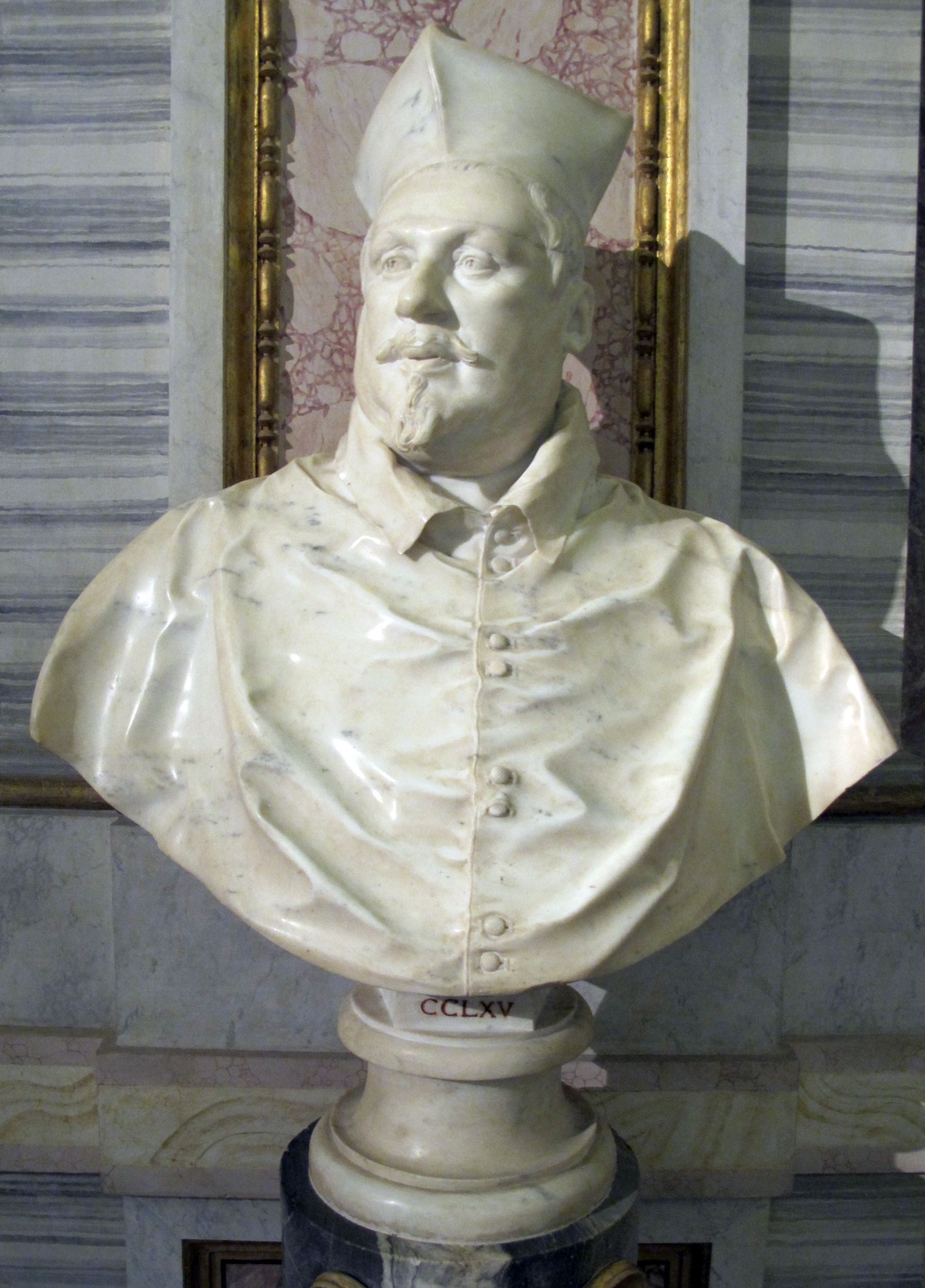
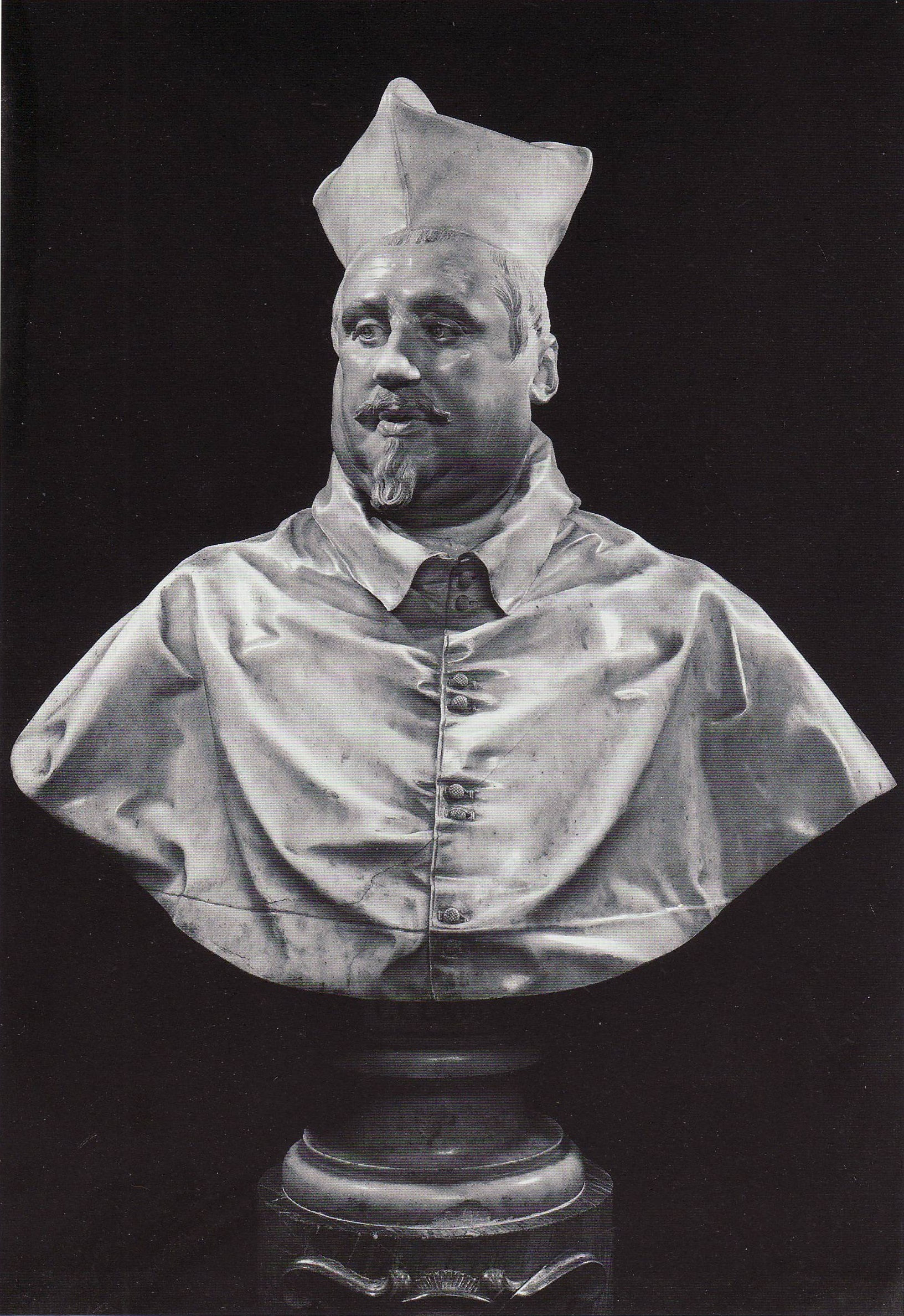
- First version Second version
- Artist: Gian Lorenzo Bernini
- Year: 1632
- Catalogue: 31
- Type: Sculpture
- Medium: Marble
- Dimensions: 78 cm (31 in)
- Location: Galleria Borghese; Rome; 41°54′50.4″N 12°29′31.2″E
- Preceded by: Charity with Four Children
- Followed by: Tomb of Countess Matilda of Tuscany

Two Busts of Cardinal Scipione Borghese are marble portrait sculptures executed by the Italian artist Gian Lorenzo Bernini in 1632. Cardinal Scipione Borghese was the nephew of Pope Paul V, and had commissioned other works from Bernini in the 1620s. Both versions of this portrait are in the Galleria Borghese, Rome.

== Description ==
The busts are quarter length, showing Scipione Borghese in his robes and biretta, as appropriate for his position as a cardinal of the Roman Church. The movement and liveliness of the sitter is one of the busts’ most pertinent features.

The cardinal looks to his right and opens his lips as if to begin speaking. Rather than a static figure in which the sitter's essence in captured by abstracting his character, Bernini has captured a specific gesture to create a likeness that is psychological as well external. The sense of movement is further emphasised by the dramatic creases and folds line his robe, suggesting the movement of his body, and, in the second version, one of the buttons is about to come undone.

== Patronage and creation ==
Both of Bernini's early biographers, Domenico Bernini and Filippo Baldinucci, recount the history of the busts and explain the creation of the second version.

After Bernini had completed the first version, the ‘allustratori’ were polishing the bust when they discovered a significant fracture in the marble across the forehead, disfiguring the face. Bernini was notified and immediately set to work to create a second version with a new block of marble, which took three days according to Domenico Bernini, and fifteen to Baldinucci.

The biographers then recount slightly different stories about how the two versions were unveiled. According to Domenico Bernini, Cardinal Borghese saw the unpolished version and was so impressed he asked that the bust be completed and be shown to his uncle, Pope Paul V. It was then the defect was discovered and Bernini created the second version, which was transported in secret to show to the Pope. But the Cardinal noticed that this was a different version and Bernini revealed the creation of the second bust. Baldinucci's tale differs somewhat – unaware there is a second version, Cardinal Borghese sees the original bust. He expresses pleasure in the work but hides his disappointment in the flaw; Bernini then uncovers the second, unblemished version to which the Cardinal responds with astonishment and pleasure at Bernini's artistry.

== Date of the busts ==
While the existence of the scar across first version explains why the second version was created, both stories should be treated with some suspicion. Much documentation, cited below, proves the busts were finished in 1632 – Pope Paul V, mentioned in both accounts, died in 1621. A document in the State Archive of Modena, dated 8 January 1633, says that "Bernini, commissioned by the Pope, has created a marble bust of Cardinal Borghese, for which he has been recompensed 500 zecchini and a diamond worth 150 scudi".

A letter from the writer Fulvio Testi to the Cardinal to Count Francesco Fontana, 29 January 1633 also talks of the bust, Testi saying it cost 1000 scudi, and that the figure is "truly alive and breathing".

Another document written by Lelio Guidiccioni on 4 June 1633 gives further credence that the portrait was done in 1632. Finally, a receipt in the Borghese archives for 23 December 1632 reveals a payment from the Borghese household to Bernini of 500 scudi.

== History and critical reaction ==
On completion, both busts were taken to the Villa Borghese. They were purchased by the Italian State in 1892, and shown at the Galleria dell’Academia in Venice, until they were reunited with the rest of the collections at the Galleria Borghese in 1908. Restoration on the works took place in 1997.

The first version is often considered the superior version with Howard Hibbard describing Bernini's handling of the marble as giving it a "new dimension of reality". Whilst the second is still clearly the work of Bernini, it is considered much less spontaneous., with Wittkower commenting that it "lacks the animation and vitality of the first one". Others, however, are quite happy to point out the strengths of the second bust, Charles Avery calling it "one of the greatest portraits of all time in any medium, this bust is a work of genius".

== Preparatory versions ==
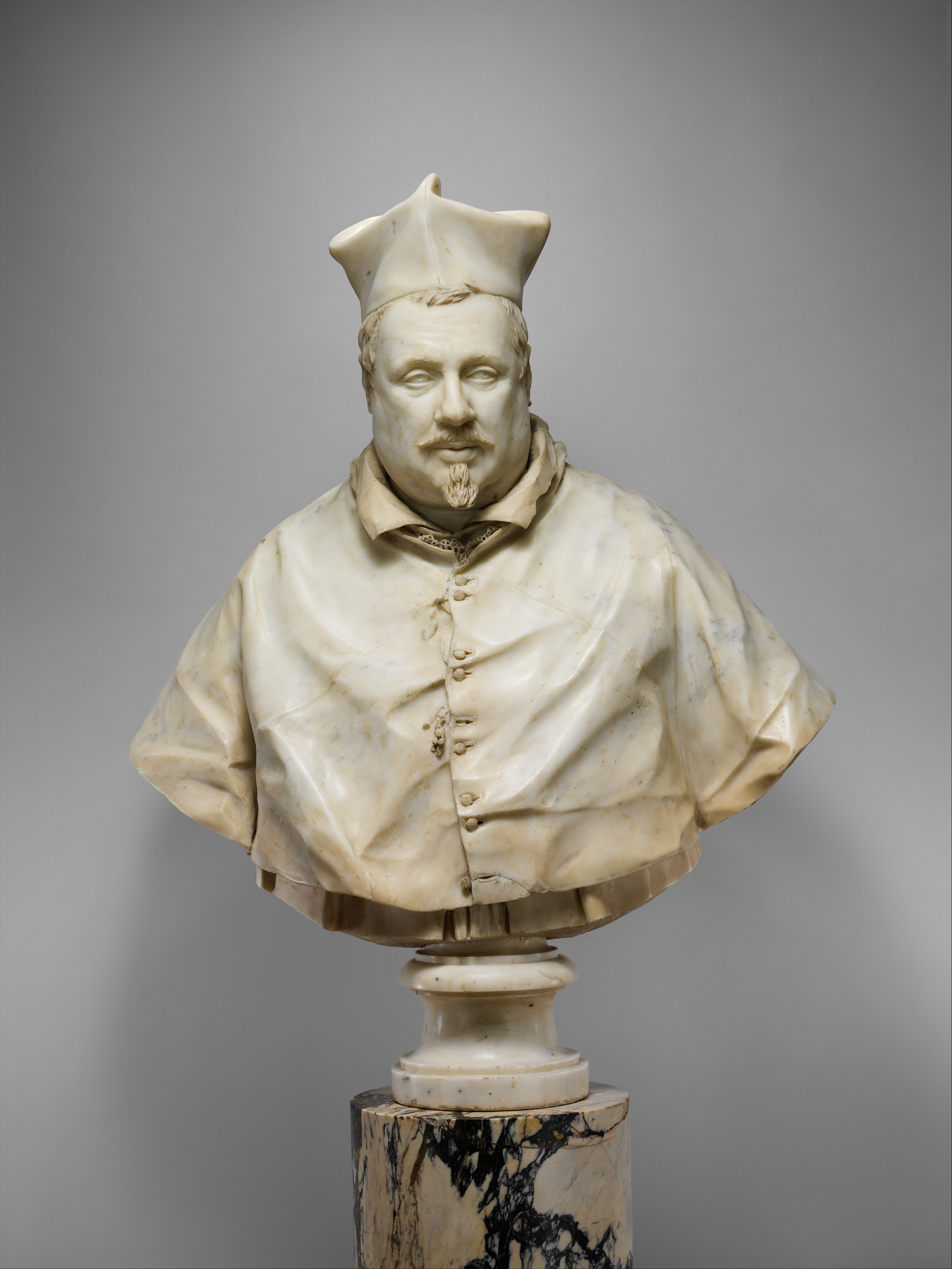
Preparatory version in the Met

The Metropolitan Museum of Art holds a preparatory sculpture.

A bronze version, created from the terracotta bozzetti (preparatory works) done by Bernini, exists in a private collection in New York.

There is also a drawing of Scipione Borghese, done in red chalk and graphite, in the Morgan Library in New York. This is the only remaining preparatory drawing.

Finally, there is a caricature of the same sitter done by Bernini in the Vatican Library, Italy.

== See also ==
- List of works by Gian Lorenzo Bernini
